= Pete Latzo =

American boxer (1902–1968)

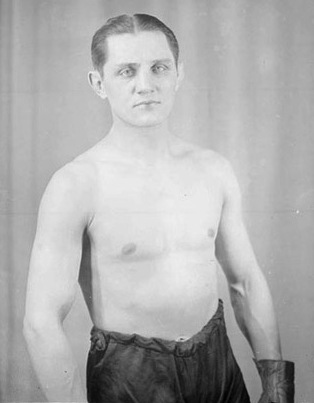

Personal information
- Nickname: Young Clancy
- Nationality: American
- Born: Pete Latzo; August 1, 1902 Colerain, Bedford County, Pennsylvania
- Died: July 7, 1968 (aged 65) Atlantic City, New Jersey
- Height: 5 ft 7 1/2 in (1.71 m)
- Weight: Welterweight

Boxing career
- Reach: 68 in (173 cm)
- Stance: Orthodox

Boxing record
- Total fights: 149
- Wins: 100
- Win by KO: 25
- Losses: 44
- Draws: 4
- No contests: 1

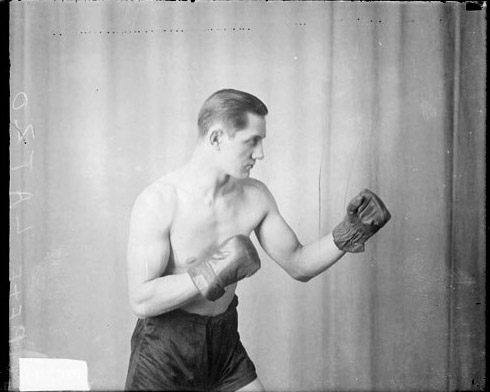
Portrait of Latzo in a fighting pose.

Pete Latzo (born August 1, 1902 – July 7, 1968) was an American boxer, who held the Undisputed World Welterweight Championship from 1926 to 1927.

== Boxing career highlights ==
Latzo was born on August 1, 1902, in Colerain, Pennsylvania, near the heart of the coal-mining county. By several accounts, Latzo spent some of his early years mining, and working as a "breaker boy" whose primary job was to pick slate and other impurities from anthracite coal. His brother Steve preceded him as a boxer in local rings with some success, once losing to Mickey Walker by knockout. His older brother Joe also boxed briefly in and around Scranton. For a period, Latzo's brother Mike managed his career, though his primary managers were Paddy Mullins and Jimmy Johnston.

In their first welterweight title fight on March 22, 1923, Mickey Walker defeated Latzo in a twelve-round newspaper's decision before a crowd of 10,000 in Newark, New Jersey. Latzo took a tremendous beating, suffering particularly from shots to the body, and was knocked down for a count of three from a solid left to the jaw in the fourth round. Latzo continued to take severe punishment to the body in the sixth round but managed to stay on his feet. With both men exhausted, the fighting in the seventh through eleventh rounds was comparatively slow, and though the twelfth round saw more offensive action from both combatants, Latzo was stunned but not knocked down by a left to the chin shortly before the final bell.

=== Taking the world welterweight title, May, 1926 ===
In an upset, Latzo defeated Mickey Walker to take the world welterweight championship before a crowd of 12,000 on May 20, 1926, in a ten-round unanimous decision in Scranton, Pennsylvania. The bout was marred somewhat by frequent clinching, holding and covering up, and it lacked haymakers and knockdowns, but Latzo executed his win after previously losing to Walker, a 3-1 favorite to win the match. The Associated Press gave Latzo five rounds, with three to Walker, and two even, and both judges ruled in his favor.

He defeated Willie Harmon on June 29, 1926, in a fifth-round knockout in Newark, New Jersey. If he had lost by knockout, Latzo's recently earned title would have been at risk. The combatants fought with neither having a strong advantage in the first four rounds. A strong left to the body that dazed Harmon followed by a solid right to the jaw during infighting in the fifth round ended the bout, though Harmon had been down very briefly in the first. Though he was a ring veteran, it was Harmon's first loss by knockout.

Latzo fought one of his last defenses of the welterweight title on July 9, 1926, against Georgie Levine, winning in a fourth round disqualification before a crowd of around 22,000 at New York's Polo Grounds. After gaining a significant margin on points, Latzo dropped to the canvas in pain. The referee upheld his claim of being hit by a low blow, 1:28 minutes into the fourth round, ending the bout.

==== Loss of the world welterweight championship, June, 1927 ====
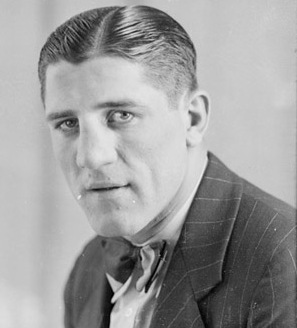
Joe Dundee

He lost the welterweight crown to Joe Dundee on June 3, 1927, in a fifteen-round majority decision before one of his largest audiences, a crowd of 30,000, at the New York City's Polo Grounds. In a fairly decisive win, the Associated Press gave Dundee ten of the fifteen rounds, building his largest points margin in the later rounds. Latzo started strong, looking best in the first, second, fourth, and twelfth, but took brutal body punishment, particularly to the kidneys, through much of the bout. By the tenth, gaining confidence and sensing victory, Dundee went to Latzo's head as well as his body with greater frequency. Several reporters attributed Latzo's lack of endurance in the later rounds to his difficulty making the 147 pound welterweight limit.

Latzo lost to Tiger Flowers, former world middleweight champion, on September 30, 1927, in a ten-round unanimous decision at Artillery Park in Wilkes-Barre, Pennsylvania. The crowd of 10,000 saw Flowers take seven rounds, though Latzo performed well in the remaining three, and dominated much of the infighting, particularly in the fifth and sixth when he delivered several close range body rocking blows. Flowers' dominating the long range fighting was understandable as he had at least a four-inch reach advantage, which required Latzo to gain points inside.

He defeated future world light heavyweight champion Maxie Rosenbloom on February 6, 1928, in a ten-round points decision in Wilkes-Barre, Pennsylvania. Latzo pulled ahead in the two final rounds in a close bout that ended in a decision unpopular with the crowd. One judge gave the decision to Rosenbloom, one called it a draw, and the referee decided in favor of Latzo. On November 21, 1927, Latzo had lost to Rosenbloom in a ten-round split decision at the Arena in Philadelphia. In a close and very fast bout, Rosenbloom scored well at long range with his straight left and left hook, but at close range, Latzo scored consistently as well. In the ninth, Rosenbloom delivered a strong blow with his left to Latzo's jaw, and may have won by a shade in the tenth when the fighting was furious. The bout was a vicious encounter throughout and Rosenbloom bled from a cut over his eye from the seventh round til the finish.

After losing the welter crown Latzo invaded the heavier ranks. For the duration of his career he fought middleweights, light heavyweights, and even a few quality heavyweights. Latzo fought many notable fighters in his career, including future heavyweight champion Jim Braddock, and middleweight champion Tiger Flowers. He is an inductee of the New Jersey Boxing Hall of Fame.

=== Challenging for the world light heavyweight title, June–July 1928 ===
Latzo challenged reigning champion Tommy Loughran for the NYSAC world light heavyweight title on June 1, 1928, at Ebbets Field in Brooklyn, but lost in a fifteen-round unanimous decision. The Associated Press gave eight rounds to Loughran, with only four to Latzo, and one even. Latzo shone in the early rounds catching Loughran on the ropes with occasional blows to both head and body, but failed to faze the light heavyweight champion in the later rounds.

Latzo challenged Loughran again for the light heavyweight title on July 16, 1928, at Artillery Park in Wilkes-Barre, Pennsylvania, but lost in a ten rounds unanimous decision. In a closer bout than their previous meeting, the Associated Press gave Loughran five rounds, Latzo four, and one even. In the third and fourth, Latzo battered through Loughran's guard and may have come close to flooring him in the fourth, but his attack faltered in the remaining rounds. A rally in the ninth and tenth appeared to win the rounds for Latzo, but Loughran had continued to pile up points in the second half of the bout, and maintained enough of a margin to take the decision.

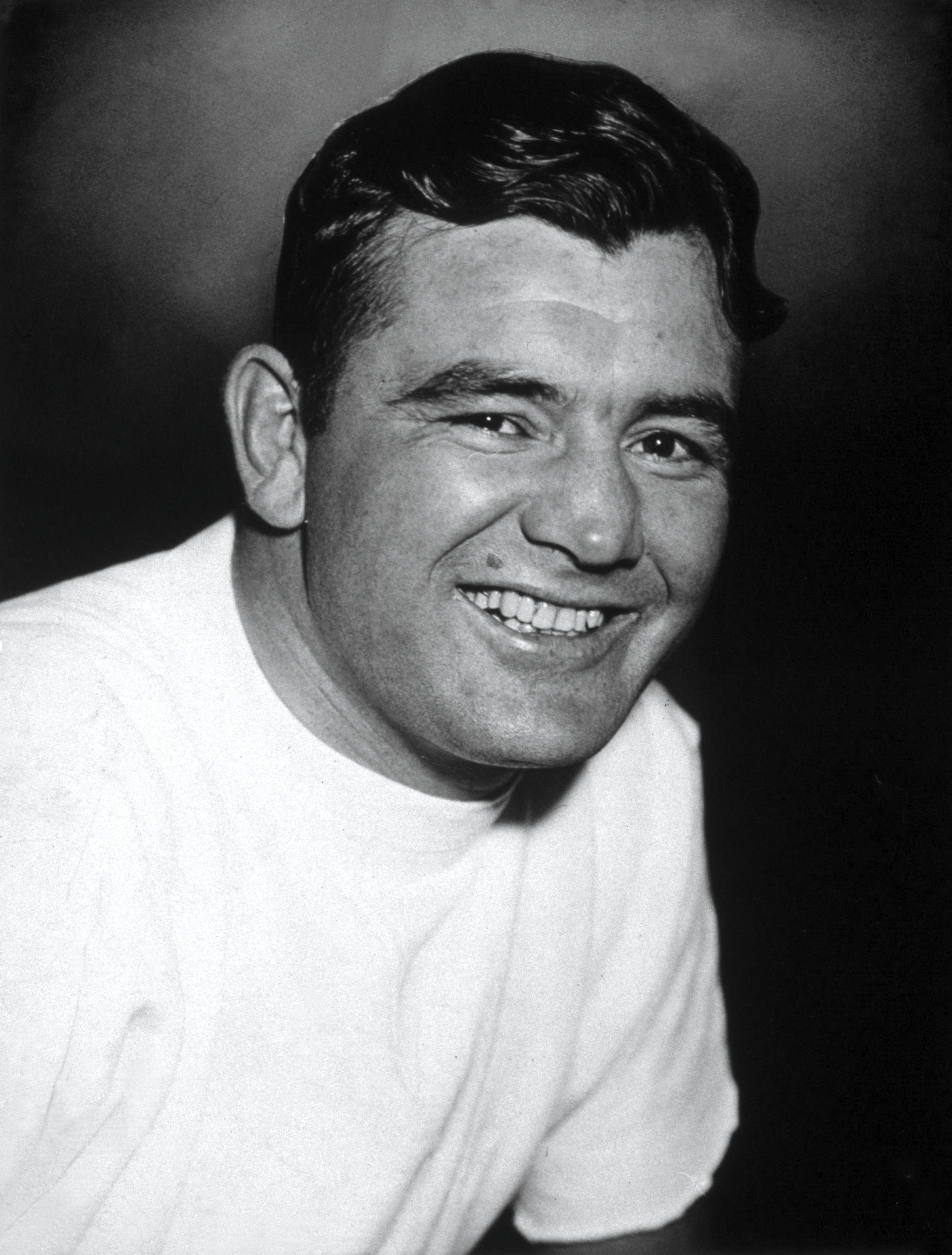
Jim Braddock

Latzo was defeated by future world heavyweight champion Jim Braddock before a crowd of 4,000, on October 17, 1928, at New Jersey's Newark Armory in a ten-round points decision. Braddock scored repeatedly with his left hook to the face and body, racking up points, and making it difficult for Latzo to mount much of an offense. The club doctor, determined that Latzo had broken his jaw, likely in the fourth round when he had received a series of left hooks. Latzo was down briefly in the ninth, and he was rocked by a hard right to the chin in the fifth. Though Latzo was the pre-fight betting favorite, The Record of Hackensack, New Jersey, gave Braddock six rounds, with the first even and Latzo taking only the second, third, and fourth. To recover from his jaw injury, according to several online boxing sites, Latzo did not fight competitively in 1929, except for a single bout in January.

Latzo defeated Larry Johnson in a close ten round points decision before 12,000 at Madison Square Garden on February 21, 1930. Though the fighting was close, Johnson was unable to score often with his powerful right, and many ringside believed Latzo, scoring often with body shots, took at least one more round than his opponent. The Brooklyn Daily Eagle reported that Johnson deserved the decision as Latzo's only advantage was his defense against Johnson, who had scored a string of consecutive knockouts before the match. Latzo was required to crouch and let Johnson lead in most of the bout, as he was wary of Johnson's dangerous right, and had a disadvantage in reach of several inches.

Latzo fought Jimmy Slattery, former world light heavyweight champion, in a seven-round No Contest on May 27, 1930, at Boston Garden. The purses of both boxers were withheld and they were ordered to leave the ring by the referee when it appeared they were exerting too little effort to merit continuing.

In one of his last bouts on June 5, 1934, Latzo lost to Pennsylvania's state middleweight champion Teddy Yarosz in a fourth-round technical knockout in Millvale. With a blow to the chin, Yarosz briefly dropped Latzo in the fourth for a one count which caused the referee to step in and end the bout. Latzo protested the call to end the bout, but Yarosz had dominated much of the match, and had stunned him badly in the third. Yarosz would take the world middleweight championship only three months later.

=== Inspiration for Joe Palooka ===
Cartoonist Ham Fisher met Latzo outside a pool hall and, impressed by his personality, sportsmanship, and physique, was inspired to create his popular character Joe Palooka. In the 1930s the strip appeared in more than 600 newspapers, had a readership around 50 million, and inspired several movies.

=== Life after boxing ===
Latzo left Scranton to reside in Marven Gardens, a suburb of Atlantic City, in Margate, NJ, near the end of his boxing career around 1928.

He found work as a welder during his boxing retirement, and pursued welding as a career until his death. He was a visible figure at many of the affairs of the Veteran Boxer Association Ring #9 events around the state of New Jersey. He was married to the former Catherine McHale, with whom he had a daughter.

He died at the age of sixty-six in Atlantic City Hospital after gall bladder surgery in July 1968, having suffered from gall bladder ailments since his boxing retirement. His gall bladder issues may well have been a result of his boxing history as he was frequently the victim of brutal body blows to the stomach and both sides of his abdomen. He had had major surgery of some form in 1937 when he fist retired from boxing, and a boxing benefit was held for him in December of that year. His funeral was held at Scranton, Pennsylvania's Holy Rosary Church on July 11, and he was buried in the city's Cathedral Cemetery, where his wife Catherine was laid to rest two years later.

== Professional boxing record ==
All information in this section is derived from BoxRec, unless otherwise stated.

=== Official record ===
149 fights	63 wins	29 losses
By knockout	25	3
By decision	34	26
By disqualification	4	0
Draws	3	
No contests	1	
Newspaper decisions/draws	53	

All newspaper decisions are officially regarded as "no decision" bouts and are not counted to the win/loss/draw column.

No.	Result	Record	Opponent	Type	Round	Date	Location	Notes
149	Loss	63–29–3 (54)	Joe Mandarano	MD	8	Jun 22, 1934	Hobbs' Arena, Shenandoah, Pennsylvania, U.S.	
148	Loss	63–28–3 (54)	Teddy Yarosz	TKO	4 (10)	Jun 5, 1934	Hickey Park, Millvale, Pennsylvania, U.S.	
147	Loss	63–27–3 (54)	Billy Ketchell	PTS	10	Apr 27, 1934	Cambria A.C., Philadelphia, Pennsylvania, U.S.	
146	Loss	63–26–3 (54)	Harry Fuller	UD	6	Jan 29, 1934	Town Hall, Scranton, Pennsylvania, U.S.	
145	Loss	63–25–3 (54)	Harry Fuller	MD	6	Jan 15, 1934	Town Hall, Scranton, Pennsylvania, U.S.	
144	Loss	63–24–3 (54)	Joe Banovic	PTS	10	Feb 26, 1932	Madison Square Garden, New York City, New York, U.S.	
143	Loss	63–23–3 (54)	George Manley	UD	10	Sep 4, 1931	City Auditorium, Denver, Colorado, U.S.	
142	Loss	63–22–3 (54)	Jimmy Britt	UD	10	Aug 18, 1931	Liberty High School Stadium, Bethlehem, Pennsylvania, U.S.	
141	Loss	63–21–3 (54)	Sam Weiss	SD	10	Jul 22, 1931	Twin City Arena, Laurel, Maryland, U.S.	
140	Loss	63–20–3 (54)	Al Ettore	PTS	10	Jun 29, 1931	Arena Stadium, Philadelphia, Pennsylvania, U.S.	
139	Loss	63–19–3 (54)	Battling Bozo	NWS	10	Jun 22, 1931	City Auditorium, Birmingham, Alabama, U.S.	
138	Loss	63–19–3 (53)	Battling Bozo	PTS	10	Jun 9, 1931	Atlanta, Georgia, U.S.	
137	Loss	63–18–3 (53)	Charley Belanger	PTS	10	May 18, 1931	Arena Gardens, Toronto, Ontario, Canada	
136	Win	63–17–3 (53)	Matt Adgie	PTS	10	Apr 27, 1931	Arena, Philadelphia, Pennsylvania, U.S.	
135	Win	62–17–3 (53)	Rattle Kichline	PTS	10	Mar 26, 1931	Coliseum, Bethlehem, Pennsylvania, U.S.	
134	Win	61–17–3 (53)	Sam Weiss	UD	10	Mar 12, 1931	Coliseum, Bethlehem, Pennsylvania, U.S.	
133	Win	60–17–3 (53)	Sam Weiss	MD	10	Feb 26, 1931	Armory, Bethlehem, Pennsylvania, U.S.	
132	Loss	59–17–3 (53)	Johnny Pilc	PTS	10	Feb 2, 1931	Laurel Garden, Newark, New Jersey, U.S.	
131	Loss	59–16–3 (53)	Joe Banovic	UD	10	Jan 22, 1931	Watres Armory, Scranton, Pennsylvania, U.S.	
130	Loss	59–15–3 (53)	Tait Littman	PTS	10	Oct 13, 1930	Riverview Rink, Milwaukee, Wisconsin, U.S.	
129	Win	59–14–3 (53)	Jimmy Herman	UD	10	Sep 15, 1930	Lakewood Park, Mahanoy City, Pennsylvania, U.S.	
128	Loss	58–14–3 (53)	Frank Cawley	UD	10	Jul 31, 1930	Kingston Armory, Kingston, Pennsylvania, U.S.	
127	Win	58–13–3 (53)	Larry Johnson	DQ	6 (10)	Jun 18, 1930	Ebbets Field, Brooklyn, New York City, New York, U.S.	
126	NC	57–13–3 (53)	Jimmy Slattery	NC	7 (10)	May 27, 1930	Boston Garden, Boston, Massachusetts, U.S.	
125	Win	57–13–3 (52)	Larry Johnson	SD	10	Feb 21, 1930	Madison Square Garden, New York City, New York, U.S.	
124	Loss	56–13–3 (52)	Billy Jones	PTS	10	Jan 27, 1930	Arena, Philadelphia, Pennsylvania, U.S.	
123	Win	56–12–3 (52)	Eddie Clark	KO	6 (10)	Jan 16, 1930	Waltz Dream Arena, Atlantic City, New Jersey, U.S.	
122	Loss	55–12–3 (52)	James J. Braddock	PTS	10	Oct 17, 1928	Newark Armory, Newark, New Jersey, U.S.	
121	Win	55–11–3 (52)	Charley Belanger	PTS	10	Oct 5, 1928	Olympia Stadium, Detroit, Michigan, U.S.	
120	Loss	54–11–3 (52)	Leo Lomski	PTS	10	Sep 7, 1928	Olympia Stadium, Detroit, Michigan, U.S.	
119	Win	54–10–3 (52)	Matt Adgie	UD	10	Aug 20, 1928	Baker Bowl, Philadelphia, Pennsylvania, U.S.	
118	Loss	53–10–3 (52)	Tommy Loughran	UD	10	Jul 16, 1928	Artillery Park, Wilkes-Barre, Pennsylvania, U.S.	For NYSAC, NBA, and The Ring light heavyweight titles
117	Win	53–9–3 (52)	Leo Lomski	DQ	6 (10)	Jun 13, 1928	Ebbets Field, Brooklyn, New York City, New York, U.S.	
116	Loss	52–9–3 (52)	Tommy Loughran	UD	15	Jun 1, 1928	Ebbets Field, Brooklyn, New York City, New York, U.S.	For NYSAC, NBA, and The Ring light heavyweight titles
115	Win	52–8–3 (52)	Bing Conley	PTS	10	May 14, 1928	St. Nicholas Arena, New York City, New York, U.S.	
114	Win	51–8–3 (52)	Tony Marullo	PTS	10	Apr 23, 1928	St. Nicholas Arena, New York City, New York, U.S.	
113	Win	50–8–3 (52)	Paul Swiderski	PTS	10	Feb 23, 1928	Arena, Syracuse, New York, U.S.	
112	Win	49–8–3 (52)	Maxie Rosenbloom	PTS	10	Feb 6, 1928	South Main Street Armory, Wilkes-Barre, Pennsylvania, U.S.	
111	Loss	48–8–3 (52)	Maxie Rosenbloom	SD	10	Nov 21, 1927	Arena, Philadelphia, Pennsylvania, U.S.	
110	Loss	48–7–3 (52)	Frankie Schoell	UD	10	Oct 28, 1927	Broadway Auditorium, Buffalo, New York, U.S.	
109	Win	48–6–3 (52)	George Warner	TKO	2 (10)	Oct 10, 1927	Arena, Philadelphia, Pennsylvania, U.S.	
108	Loss	47–6–3 (52)	Tiger Flowers	UD	10	Sep 30, 1927	Artillery Park, Wilkes-Barre, Pennsylvania, U.S.	
107	Win	47–5–3 (52)	Dick Evans	NWS	10	Sep 19, 1927	Auditorium, Canton, Ohio, U.S.	
106	Draw	47–5–3 (51)	Jack McVey	PTS	12	Aug 30, 1927	Taylor Bowl, Newburgh Heights, Ohio, U.S.	
105	Win	47–5–2 (51)	Johnny Saxon	TKO	4 (10)	Aug 27, 1927	Town Hall, Scranton, Pennsylvania, U.S.	
104	Win	46–5–2 (51)	Allentown Joe Gans	DQ	8 (10)	Aug 23, 1927	Artillery Park, Wilkes-Barre, Pennsylvania, U.S.	
103	Loss	45–5–2 (51)	Joe Dundee	MD	15	Jun 3, 1927	Polo Grounds, New York City, New York, U.S.	Lost NYSAC, NBA, and The Ring welterweight titles
102	Win	45–4–2 (51)	Jack Rappaport	TKO	3 (10)	May 9, 1927	Town Hall, Scranton, Pennsylvania, U.S.	
101	Loss	44–4–2 (51)	Joe Simonich	UD	10	Mar 10, 1927	Dexter Park Pavilion, Chicago, Illinois, U.S.	
100	Loss	44–3–2 (51)	Clyde Hull	NWS	10	Feb 21, 1927	Gardner Park Arena, Dallas, Texas, U.S.	
99	Win	44–3–2 (50)	Billy Piltz	NWS	10	Feb 18, 1927	Coliseum, Oklahoma City, Oklahoma, U.S.	
98	Win	44–3–2 (49)	Jimmy Jones	PTS	10	Jan 24, 1927	Motor Square Garden, Pittsburgh, Pennsylvania, U.S.	
97	Win	43–3–2 (49)	Sergeant Sammy Baker	UD	10	Jan 14, 1927	South Main Street Armory, Wilkes-Barre, Pennsylvania, U.S.	
96	Win	42–3–2 (49)	Joe Simonich	NWS	12	Dec 8, 1926	113th Regiment Armory, Newark, New Jersey, U.S.	
95	Win	42–3–2 (48)	Ted Nelson	TKO	4 (12)	Jul 16, 1926	North End Baseball Park, Steubenville, Ohio, U.S.	
94	Win	41–3–2 (48)	Georgie Levine	DQ	4 (15)	Jul 9, 1926	Polo Grounds, New York City, New York, U.S.	Retained NYSAC, NBA, and The Ring welterweight titles
93	Win	40–3–2 (48)	Willie Harmon	KO	5 (12)	Jun 29, 1926	Dreamland Park, Newark, New Jersey, U.S.	Retained NYSAC, NBA, and The Ring welterweight titles
92	Win	39–3–2 (48)	Mickey Walker	UD	10	May 20, 1926	Watres Armory, Scranton, Pennsylvania, U.S.	Won NYSAC, NBA, and The Ring welterweight titles
91	Win	38–3–2 (48)	Georgie Russell	TKO	9 (10)	Mar 23, 1926	South Main Street Armory, Wilkes-Barre, Pennsylvania, U.S.	
90	Win	37–3–2 (48)	Morrie Schlaifer	UD	10	Feb 15, 1926	Arena, Philadelphia, Pennsylvania, U.S.	
89	Win	36–3–2 (48)	Joe Carlo	TKO	1 (10)	Jan 25, 1926	Town Hall, Scranton, Pennsylvania, U.S.	
88	Win	35–3–2 (48)	Italian Joe Gans	PTS	10	Jan 4, 1926	Broadway Arena, Brooklyn, New York City, New York, U.S.	
87	Win	34–3–2 (48)	Bermondsey Billy Wells	NWS	12	Dec 21, 1925	Newark, New Jersey, U.S.	
86	Win	34–3–2 (47)	Bobby Barrett	PTS	10	Oct 12, 1925	Town Hall, Scranton, Pennsylvania, U.S.	
85	Win	33–3–2 (47)	Italian Joe Gans	PTS	10	Sep 14, 1925	Town Hall, Scranton, Pennsylvania, U.S.	
84	Loss	32–3–2 (47)	Morrie Schlaifer	KO	3 (10)	Jun 23, 1925	Artillery Park, Wilkes-Barre, Pennsylvania, U.S.	
83	Win	32–2–2 (47)	Georgie Levine	PTS	10	Jun 16, 1925	Coney Island Stadium, Brooklyn, New York City, New York, U.S.	
82	Win	31–2–2 (47)	Willie Harmon	UD	10	May 11, 1925	Town Hall, Scranton, Pennsylvania, U.S.	
81	Win	30–2–2 (47)	Manny Owens	TKO	4 (10)	Apr 27, 1925	Town Hall, Scranton, Pennsylvania, U.S.	
80	Win	29–2–2 (47)	Jack Rappaport	PTS	10	Mar 6, 1925	Legion Stadium, Hollywood, California, U.S.	
79	Loss	28–2–2 (47)	Bermondsey Billy Wells	PTS	10	Jan 28, 1925	Auditorium, Oakland, California, U.S.	
78	Win	28–1–2 (47)	Eddie Burnbrook	KO	2 (10)	Jan 19, 1925	Town Hall, Scranton, Pennsylvania, U.S.	
77	Win	27–1–2 (47)	Pat Haley	KO	2 (10)	Jan 1, 1925	Town Hall, Scranton, Pennsylvania, U.S.	
76	Win	26–1–2 (47)	Tillie Herman	PTS	4	Dec 12, 1924	Legion Stadium, Hollywood, California, U.S.	
75	Win	25–1–2 (47)	Morrie Schlaifer	PTS	10	Nov 21, 1924	Auditorium, Omaha, Nebraska, U.S.	
74	Loss	24–1–2 (47)	Willie Harmon	NWS	12	Sep 8, 1924	Bank Street Open-Air Arena, Newark, New Jersey, U.S.	
73	Win	24–1–2 (46)	Frankie Venchell	MD	10	Aug 29, 1924	Exeter Ball Park, Exeter, Pennsylvania, U.S.	
72	Win	23–1–2 (46)	Frankie Quill	TKO	2 (10)	Aug 11, 1924	Town Hall, Scranton, Pennsylvania, U.S.	
71	Win	22–1–2 (46)	Phil Kaplan	MD	10	Jun 27, 1924	109th Infantry Armory, Scranton, Pennsylvania, U.S.	
70	Draw	21–1–2 (46)	Dave Shade	UD	10	May 19, 1924	South Main Street Armory, Wilkes-Barre, Pennsylvania, U.S.	
69	Win	21–1–1 (46)	Harry Galfund	UD	10	Apr 24, 1924	109th Infantry Armory, Scranton, Pennsylvania, U.S.	
68	Win	20–1–1 (46)	Georgie Ward	PTS	10	Apr 5, 1924	108th Field Artillery Armory, Philadelphia, Pennsylvania, U.S.	
67	Win	19–1–1 (46)	Bermondsey Billy Wells	UD	10	Feb 26, 1924	Mechanics Building, Boston, Massachusetts, U.S.	
66	Loss	18–1–1 (46)	Frankie Schoell	UD	10	Jan 14, 1924	Town Hall, Scranton, Pennsylvania, U.S.	
65	Win	18–0–1 (46)	Georgie Ward	UD	10	Jan 10, 1924	Feeley Hall, Hazleton, Pennsylvania, U.S.	
64	Win	17–0–1 (46)	Wally Hinckle	KO	2 (10)	Dec 17, 1923	Feeley Hall, Hazleton, Pennsylvania, U.S.	
63	Draw	16–0–1 (46)	Phil Kaplan	PTS	12	Jun 13, 1923	Coney Island Velodrome, Brooklyn, New York City, New York, U.S.	
62	Win	16–0 (46)	Young George Erne	KO	6 (10)	Jun 5, 1923	109th Infantry Armory, Scranton, Pennsylvania, U.S.	
61	Draw	15–0 (46)	Jimmy Jones	NWS	12	Apr 2, 1923	Oak Hill Auditorium, Youngstown, Ohio, U.S.	
60	Loss	15–0 (45)	Mickey Walker	NWS	12	Mar 22, 1923	113th Regiment Armory, Newark, New Jersey, U.S.	NYSAC and NBA welterweight titles at stake; (via KO only)
59	Loss	15–0 (44)	Frankie Schoell	NWS	10	Feb 19, 1923	South Main Street Armory, Wilkes-Barre, Pennsylvania, U.S.	
58	Win	15–0 (43)	Johnny Karr	NWS	12	Feb 15, 1923	Oak Hill Auditorium, Youngstown, Ohio, U.S.	
57	Win	15–0 (42)	Johnny Nichols	UD	12	Feb 9, 1923	Madison Square Garden, New York City, New York, U.S.	
56	Win	14–0 (42)	Paul Doyle	UD	10	Feb 6, 1923	Mechanics Building, Boston, Massachusetts, U.S.	
55	Win	13–0 (42)	Georgie Ward	NWS	12	Jan 16, 1923	Broad A.C., Newark, New Jersey, U.S.	
54	Win	13–0 (41)	Sailor Friedman	NWS	8	Dec 11, 1922	Arena, Philadelphia, Pennsylvania, U.S.	
53	Win	13–0 (40)	Tim Droney	NWS	10	Nov 30, 1922	Town Hall, Scranton, Pennsylvania, U.S.	
52	Win	13–0 (39)	Georgie Ward	NWS	10	Nov 9, 1922	Town Hall, Scranton, Pennsylvania, U.S.	
51	Loss	13–0 (38)	Eddie Shevlin	NWS	10	Oct 16, 1922	South Main Street Armory, Wilkes-Barre, Pennsylvania, U.S.	
50	Win	13–0 (37)	Frankie Schoell	NWS	10	Oct 3, 1922	Crystal Palace, Rocky Glen, Pennsylvania, U.S.	
49	Win	13–0 (36)	Bermondsey Billy Wells	NWS	10	Aug 10, 1922	Town Hall, Scranton, Pennsylvania, U.S.	
48	Loss	13–0 (35)	Paul Doyle	NWS	10	Jul 25, 1922	Town Hall, Scranton, Pennsylvania, U.S.	
47	Win	13–0 (34)	Dave Shade	NWS	10	May 17, 1922	South Main Street Armory, Wilkes-Barre, Pennsylvania, U.S.	
46	Win	13–0 (33)	Marty Summers	NWS	10	May 4, 1922	Town Hall, Scranton, Pennsylvania, U.S.	
45	Win	13–0 (32)	Al Brown	NWS	10	Apr 6, 1922	Town Hall, Scranton, Pennsylvania, U.S.	
44	Win	13–0 (31)	Jack Palmer	NWS	10	Mar 31, 1922	Feeley Hall, Hazleton, Pennsylvania, U.S.	
43	Win	13–0 (30)	Jack Palmer	PTS	8	Feb 3, 1922	Madison Square Garden, New York City, New York, U.S.	
42	Loss	12–0 (30)	Frankie Schoell	NWS	10	Jan 26, 1922	Town Hall, Scranton, Pennsylvania, U.S.	
41	Win	12–0 (29)	Al Norton	NWS	10	Jan 12, 1922	Town Hall, Scranton, Pennsylvania, U.S.	
40	Win	12–0 (28)	Jack Palmer	NWS	10	Dec 23, 1921	Town Hall, Scranton, Pennsylvania, U.S.	
39	Win	12–0 (27)	Tim Droney	NWS	10	Nov 3, 1921	South Main Street Armory, Wilkes-Barre, Pennsylvania, U.S.	
38	Win	12–0 (26)	Jimmy Sullivan	TKO	7 (8)	Oct 31, 1921	Olympia A.C., Philadelphia, Pennsylvania, U.S.	
37	Win	11–0 (26)	Barney Adair	NWS	10	Oct 28, 1921	Town Hall, Scranton, Pennsylvania, U.S.	
36	Win	11–0 (25)	Tim Droney	NWS	10	Oct 15, 1921	South Main Street Armory, Wilkes-Barre, Pennsylvania, U.S.	
35	Win	11–0 (24)	Nick Moon	KO	6 (10)	Oct 13, 1921	Town Hall, Scranton, Pennsylvania, U.S.	
34	Win	10–0 (24)	Harry Turner	KO	2 (10)	Sep 9, 1921	Town Hall, Scranton, Pennsylvania, U.S.	
33	Win	9–0 (24)	Johnny Herman	NWS	10	Sep 2, 1921	Feeley Hall, Hazleton, Pennsylvania, U.S.	
32	Win	9–0 (23)	Tim Droney	NWS	10	Aug 4, 1921	Athletic Park, Scranton, Pennsylvania, U.S.	
31	Win	9–0 (22)	Jake Schiffer	KO	1 (10)	Jun 29, 1921	Athletic Park, Scranton, Pennsylvania, U.S.	
30	Win	8–0 (22)	Bud Logan	NWS	8	Jun 6, 1921	Federal League Baseball Park, Harrison, New Jersey, U.S.	
29	Win	8–0 (21)	Sammy Berne	NWS	10	May 10, 1921	Athletic Park, Scranton, Pennsylvania, U.S.	
28	Win	8–0 (20)	Benny Cohen	NWS	?	May 4, 1921	Morristown, New Jersey, U.S.	
27	Win	8–0 (19)	George Reynolds	NWS	10	Apr 14, 1921	Town Hall, Scranton, Pennsylvania, U.S.	
26	Win	8–0 (18)	Westside Jimmy Duffy	UD	12	Apr 4, 1921	Victory Hall, Johnson City, New York, U.S.	
25	Win	7–0 (18)	Al Dewey	NWS	10	Jan 17, 1921	South Main Street Armory, Wilkes-Barre, Pennsylvania, U.S.	
24	Win	7–0 (17)	Ren Carlin	TKO	7 (10)	Dec 25, 1920	Freeland Opera House, Freeland, Pennsylvania, U.S.	
23	Win	6–0 (17)	Jimmy Shevlin	NWS	10	Dec 15, 1920	South Main Street Armory, Wilkes-Barre, Pennsylvania, U.S.	
22	Loss	6–0 (16)	Frankie Venchell	NWS	10	Nov 15, 1920	South Main Street Armory, Wilkes-Barre, Pennsylvania, U.S.	
21	Win	6–0 (15)	Willie Ritchie	NWS	10	Oct 14, 1920	Town Hall, Scranton, Pennsylvania, U.S.	
20	Win	6–0 (14)	George Reynolds	NWS	10	Sep 17, 1920	Lapchack's Hall, Hazleton, Pennsylvania, U.S.	
19	Win	6–0 (13)	Johnny Mahoney	NWS	10	Aug 17, 1920	Feeley Hall, Hazleton, Pennsylvania, U.S.	
18	Loss	6–0 (12)	Al Murphy	NWS	10	Jun 25, 1920	Athletic Park, Scranton, Pennsylvania, U.S.	
17	Loss	6–0 (11)	Willie Ritchie	NWS	10	May 26, 1920	Town Hall, Scranton, Pennsylvania, U.S.	
16	Win	6–0 (10)	George Reynolds	NWS	10	Apr 15, 1920	Boone Hall, St. Clair, Pennsylvania, U.S.	
15	Win	6–0 (9)	Joe O'Neill	NWS	10	Mar 11, 1920	Town Hall, Scranton, Pennsylvania, U.S.	
14	Win	6–0 (8)	Al Reynolds	NWS	10	Mar 8, 1920	Charlton's Hall, Pottsville, Pennsylvania, U.S.	
13	Win	6–0 (7)	Al Reynolds	NWS	8	Feb 23, 1920	Charlton's Hall, Pottsville, Pennsylvania, U.S.	
12	Loss	6–0 (6)	Joe O'Neill	NWS	10	Feb 13, 1920	Town Hall, Scranton, Pennsylvania, U.S.	
11	Win	6–0 (5)	Frankie McCarthy	TKO	6 (10)	Jan 29, 1920	Town Hall, Scranton, Pennsylvania, U.S.	
10	Win	5–0 (5)	Mickey Malloy	KO	3 (10)	Jan 1, 1920	Town Hall, Scranton, Pennsylvania, U.S.	
9	Win	4–0 (5)	Joe Sugars	NWS	6	Dec 29, 1919	Armory, Plymouth, Pennsylvania, U.S.	
8	Loss	4–0 (4)	Joe Sugars	NWS	6	Oct 17, 1919	Nesbitt Theatre, Wilkes-Barre, Pennsylvania, U.S.	
7	Loss	4–0 (3)	Billy Gannon	NWS	6	Sep 27, 1919	National A.C., Philadelphia, Pennsylvania, U.S.	
6	Win	4–0 (2)	Willie DeHaut	KO	2 (6)	May 8, 1919	Town Hall, Scranton, Pennsylvania, U.S.	
5	Win	3–0 (2)	K O Grant	KO	2 (4)	Apr 7, 1919	Nesbitt Theatre, Wilkes-Barre, Pennsylvania, U.S.	
4	Win	2–0 (2)	Eddie Milhelm	KO	2 (4)	Mar 31, 1919	Nesbitt Theatre, Wilkes-Barre, Pennsylvania, U.S.	
3	Win	1–0 (2)	Jake Henry	NWS	6	Mar 13, 1919	Town Hall, Scranton, Pennsylvania, U.S.	
2	Win	1–0 (1)	Silent Cawley	NWS	6	Feb 27, 1919	Town Hall, Scranton, Pennsylvania, U.S.	
1	Win	1–0	Red Ferguson	TKO	3 (6)	Feb 13, 1919	Town Hall, Scranton, Pennsylvania, U.S.	

=== Unofficial record ===
149 fights	101 wins	43 losses
By knockout	25	3
By decision	72	40
By disqualification	4	0
Draws	4	
No contests	1	

Record with the inclusion of newspaper decisions to the win/loss/draw column.

No.	Result	Record	Opponent	Type	Round	Date	Location	Notes
149	Loss	101–43–4 (1)	Joe Mandarano	MD	8	Jun 22, 1934	Hobbs' Arena, Shenandoah, Pennsylvania, U.S.	
148	Loss	101–42–4 (1)	Teddy Yarosz	TKO	4 (10)	Jun 5, 1934	Hickey Park, Millvale, Pennsylvania, U.S.	
147	Loss	101–41–4 (1)	Billy Ketchell	PTS	10	Apr 27, 1934	Cambria A.C., Philadelphia, Pennsylvania, U.S.	
146	Loss	101–40–4 (1)	Harry Fuller	UD	6	Jan 29, 1934	Town Hall, Scranton, Pennsylvania, U.S.	
145	Loss	101–39–4 (1)	Harry Fuller	MD	6	Jan 15, 1934	Town Hall, Scranton, Pennsylvania, U.S.	
144	Loss	101–38–4 (1)	Joe Banovic	PTS	10	Feb 26, 1932	Madison Square Garden, New York City, New York, U.S.	
143	Loss	101–37–4 (1)	George Manley	UD	10	Sep 4, 1931	City Auditorium, Denver, Colorado, U.S.	
142	Loss	101–36–4 (1)	Jimmy Britt	UD	10	Aug 18, 1931	Liberty High School Stadium, Bethlehem, Pennsylvania, U.S.	
141	Loss	101–35–4 (1)	Sam Weiss	SD	10	Jul 22, 1931	Twin City Arena, Laurel, Maryland, U.S.	
140	Loss	101–34–4 (1)	Al Ettore	PTS	10	Jun 29, 1931	Arena Stadium, Philadelphia, Pennsylvania, U.S.	
139	Loss	101–33–4 (1)	Battling Bozo	NWS	10	Jun 22, 1931	City Auditorium, Birmingham, Alabama, U.S.	
138	Loss	101–32–4 (1)	Battling Bozo	PTS	10	Jun 9, 1931	Atlanta, Georgia, U.S.	
137	Loss	101–31–4 (1)	Charley Belanger	PTS	10	May 18, 1931	Arena Gardens, Toronto, Ontario, Canada	
136	Win	101–30–4 (1)	Matt Adgie	PTS	10	Apr 27, 1931	Arena, Philadelphia, Pennsylvania, U.S.	
135	Win	100–30–4 (1)	Rattle Kichline	PTS	10	Mar 26, 1931	Coliseum, Bethlehem, Pennsylvania, U.S.	
134	Win	99–30–4 (1)	Sam Weiss	UD	10	Mar 12, 1931	Coliseum, Bethlehem, Pennsylvania, U.S.	
133	Win	98–30–4 (1)	Sam Weiss	MD	10	Feb 26, 1931	Armory, Bethlehem, Pennsylvania, U.S.	
132	Loss	97–30–4 (1)	Johnny Pilc	PTS	10	Feb 2, 1931	Laurel Garden, Newark, New Jersey, U.S.	
131	Loss	97–29–4 (1)	Joe Banovic	UD	10	Jan 22, 1931	Watres Armory, Scranton, Pennsylvania, U.S.	
130	Loss	97–28–4 (1)	Tait Littman	PTS	10	Oct 13, 1930	Riverview Rink, Milwaukee, Wisconsin, U.S.	
129	Win	97–27–4 (1)	Jimmy Herman	UD	10	Sep 15, 1930	Lakewood Park, Mahanoy City, Pennsylvania, U.S.	
128	Loss	96–27–4 (1)	Frank Cawley	UD	10	Jul 31, 1930	Kingston Armory, Kingston, Pennsylvania, U.S.	
127	Win	96–26–4 (1)	Larry Johnson	DQ	6 (10)	Jun 18, 1930	Ebbets Field, Brooklyn, New York City, New York, U.S.	
126	NC	95–26–4 (1)	Jimmy Slattery	NC	7 (10)	May 27, 1930	Boston Garden, Boston, Massachusetts, U.S.	
125	Win	95–26–4	Larry Johnson	SD	10	Feb 21, 1930	Madison Square Garden, New York City, New York, U.S.	
124	Loss	94–26–4	Billy Jones	PTS	10	Jan 27, 1930	Arena, Philadelphia, Pennsylvania, U.S.	
123	Win	94–25–4	Eddie Clark	KO	6 (10)	Jan 16, 1930	Waltz Dream Arena, Atlantic City, New Jersey, U.S.	
122	Loss	93–25–4	James J. Braddock	PTS	10	Oct 17, 1928	Newark Armory, Newark, New Jersey, U.S.	
121	Win	93–24–4	Charley Belanger	PTS	10	Oct 5, 1928	Olympia Stadium, Detroit, Michigan, U.S.	
120	Loss	92–24–4	Leo Lomski	PTS	10	Sep 7, 1928	Olympia Stadium, Detroit, Michigan, U.S.	
119	Win	92–23–4	Matt Adgie	UD	10	Aug 20, 1928	Baker Bowl, Philadelphia, Pennsylvania, U.S.	
118	Loss	91–23–4	Tommy Loughran	UD	10	Jul 16, 1928	Artillery Park, Wilkes-Barre, Pennsylvania, U.S.	For NYSAC, NBA, and The Ring light heavyweight titles
117	Win	91–22–4	Leo Lomski	DQ	6 (10)	Jun 13, 1928	Ebbets Field, Brooklyn, New York City, New York, U.S.	
116	Loss	90–22–4	Tommy Loughran	UD	15	Jun 1, 1928	Ebbets Field, Brooklyn, New York City, New York, U.S.	For NYSAC, NBA, and The Ring light heavyweight titles
115	Win	90–21–4	Bing Conley	PTS	10	May 14, 1928	St. Nicholas Arena, New York City, New York, U.S.	
114	Win	89–21–4	Tony Marullo	PTS	10	Apr 23, 1928	St. Nicholas Arena, New York City, New York, U.S.	
113	Win	88–21–4	Paul Swiderski	PTS	10	Feb 23, 1928	Arena, Syracuse, New York, U.S.	
112	Win	87–21–4	Maxie Rosenbloom	PTS	10	Feb 6, 1928	South Main Street Armory, Wilkes-Barre, Pennsylvania, U.S.	
111	Loss	86–21–4	Maxie Rosenbloom	SD	10	Nov 21, 1927	Arena, Philadelphia, Pennsylvania, U.S.	
110	Loss	86–20–4	Frankie Schoell	UD	10	Oct 28, 1927	Broadway Auditorium, Buffalo, New York, U.S.	
109	Win	86–19–4	George Warner	TKO	2 (10)	Oct 10, 1927	Arena, Philadelphia, Pennsylvania, U.S.	
108	Loss	85–19–4	Tiger Flowers	UD	10	Sep 30, 1927	Artillery Park, Wilkes-Barre, Pennsylvania, U.S.	
107	Win	85–18–4	Dick Evans	NWS	10	Sep 19, 1927	Auditorium, Canton, Ohio, U.S.	
106	Draw	84–18–4	Jack McVey	PTS	12	Aug 30, 1927	Taylor Bowl, Newburgh Heights, Ohio, U.S.	
105	Win	84–18–3	Johnny Saxon	TKO	4 (10)	Aug 27, 1927	Town Hall, Scranton, Pennsylvania, U.S.	
104	Win	83–18–3	Allentown Joe Gans	DQ	8 (10)	Aug 23, 1927	Artillery Park, Wilkes-Barre, Pennsylvania, U.S.	
103	Loss	82–18–3	Joe Dundee	MD	15	Jun 3, 1927	Polo Grounds, New York City, New York, U.S.	Lost NYSAC, NBA, and The Ring welterweight titles
102	Win	82–17–3	Jack Rappaport	TKO	3 (10)	May 9, 1927	Town Hall, Scranton, Pennsylvania, U.S.	
101	Loss	81–17–3	Joe Simonich	UD	10	Mar 10, 1927	Dexter Park Pavilion, Chicago, Illinois, U.S.	
100	Loss	81–16–3	Clyde Hull	NWS	10	Feb 21, 1927	Gardner Park Arena, Dallas, Texas, U.S.	
99	Win	81–15–3	Billy Piltz	NWS	10	Feb 18, 1927	Coliseum, Oklahoma City, Oklahoma, U.S.	
98	Win	80–15–3	Jimmy Jones	PTS	10	Jan 24, 1927	Motor Square Garden, Pittsburgh, Pennsylvania, U.S.	
97	Win	79–15–3	Sergeant Sammy Baker	UD	10	Jan 14, 1927	South Main Street Armory, Wilkes-Barre, Pennsylvania, U.S.	
96	Win	78–15–3	Joe Simonich	NWS	12	Dec 8, 1926	113th Regiment Armory, Newark, New Jersey, U.S.	
95	Win	77–15–3	Ted Nelson	TKO	4 (12)	Jul 16, 1926	North End Baseball Park, Steubenville, Ohio, U.S.	
94	Win	76–15–3	Georgie Levine	DQ	4 (15)	Jul 9, 1926	Polo Grounds, New York City, New York, U.S.	Retained NYSAC, NBA, and The Ring welterweight titles
93	Win	75–15–3	Willie Harmon	KO	5 (12)	Jun 29, 1926	Dreamland Park, Newark, New Jersey, U.S.	Retained NYSAC, NBA, and The Ring welterweight titles
92	Win	74–15–3	Mickey Walker	UD	10	May 20, 1926	Watres Armory, Scranton, Pennsylvania, U.S.	Won NYSAC, NBA, and The Ring welterweight titles
91	Win	73–15–3	Georgie Russell	TKO	9 (10)	Mar 23, 1926	South Main Street Armory, Wilkes-Barre, Pennsylvania, U.S.	
90	Win	72–15–3	Morrie Schlaifer	UD	10	Feb 15, 1926	Arena, Philadelphia, Pennsylvania, U.S.	
89	Win	71–15–3	Joe Carlo	TKO	1 (10)	Jan 25, 1926	Town Hall, Scranton, Pennsylvania, U.S.	
88	Win	70–15–3	Italian Joe Gans	PTS	10	Jan 4, 1926	Broadway Arena, Brooklyn, New York City, New York, U.S.	
87	Win	69–15–3	Bermondsey Billy Wells	NWS	12	Dec 21, 1925	Newark, New Jersey, U.S.	
86	Win	68–15–3	Bobby Barrett	PTS	10	Oct 12, 1925	Town Hall, Scranton, Pennsylvania, U.S.	
85	Win	67–15–3	Italian Joe Gans	PTS	10	Sep 14, 1925	Town Hall, Scranton, Pennsylvania, U.S.	
84	Loss	66–15–3	Morrie Schlaifer	KO	3 (10)	Jun 23, 1925	Artillery Park, Wilkes-Barre, Pennsylvania, U.S.	
83	Win	66–14–3	Georgie Levine	PTS	10	Jun 16, 1925	Coney Island Stadium, Brooklyn, New York City, New York, U.S.	
82	Win	65–14–3	Willie Harmon	UD	10	May 11, 1925	Town Hall, Scranton, Pennsylvania, U.S.	
81	Win	64–14–3	Manny Owens	TKO	4 (10)	Apr 27, 1925	Town Hall, Scranton, Pennsylvania, U.S.	
80	Win	63–14–3	Jack Rappaport	PTS	10	Mar 6, 1925	Legion Stadium, Hollywood, California, U.S.	
79	Loss	62–14–3	Bermondsey Billy Wells	PTS	10	Jan 28, 1925	Auditorium, Oakland, California, U.S.	
78	Win	62–13–3	Eddie Burnbrook	KO	2 (10)	Jan 19, 1925	Town Hall, Scranton, Pennsylvania, U.S.	
77	Win	61–13–3	Pat Haley	KO	2 (10)	Jan 1, 1925	Town Hall, Scranton, Pennsylvania, U.S.	
76	Win	60–13–3	Tillie Herman	PTS	4	Dec 12, 1924	Legion Stadium, Hollywood, California, U.S.	
75	Win	59–13–3	Morrie Schlaifer	PTS	10	Nov 21, 1924	Auditorium, Omaha, Nebraska, U.S.	
74	Loss	58–13–3	Willie Harmon	NWS	12	Sep 8, 1924	Bank Street Open-Air Arena, Newark, New Jersey, U.S.	
73	Win	58–12–3	Frankie Venchell	MD	10	Aug 29, 1924	Exeter Ball Park, Exeter, Pennsylvania, U.S.	
72	Win	57–12–3	Frankie Quill	TKO	2 (10)	Aug 11, 1924	Town Hall, Scranton, Pennsylvania, U.S.	
71	Win	56–12–3	Phil Kaplan	MD	10	Jun 27, 1924	109th Infantry Armory, Scranton, Pennsylvania, U.S.	
70	Draw	55–12–3	Dave Shade	UD	10	May 19, 1924	South Main Street Armory, Wilkes-Barre, Pennsylvania, U.S.	
69	Win	55–12–2	Harry Galfund	UD	10	Apr 24, 1924	109th Infantry Armory, Scranton, Pennsylvania, U.S.	
68	Win	54–12–2	Georgie Ward	PTS	10	Apr 5, 1924	108th Field Artillery Armory, Philadelphia, Pennsylvania, U.S.	
67	Win	53–12–2	Bermondsey Billy Wells	UD	10	Feb 26, 1924	Mechanics Building, Boston, Massachusetts, U.S.	
66	Loss	52–12–2	Frankie Schoell	UD	10	Jan 14, 1924	Town Hall, Scranton, Pennsylvania, U.S.	
65	Win	52–11–2	Georgie Ward	UD	10	Jan 10, 1924	Feeley Hall, Hazleton, Pennsylvania, U.S.	
64	Win	51–11–2	Wally Hinckle	KO	2 (10)	Dec 17, 1923	Feeley Hall, Hazleton, Pennsylvania, U.S.	
63	Draw	50–11–2	Phil Kaplan	PTS	12	Jun 13, 1923	Coney Island Velodrome, Brooklyn, New York City, New York, U.S.	
62	Win	50–11–1	Young George Erne	KO	6 (10)	Jun 5, 1923	109th Infantry Armory, Scranton, Pennsylvania, U.S.	
61	Draw	49–11–1	Jimmy Jones	NWS	12	Apr 2, 1923	Oak Hill Auditorium, Youngstown, Ohio, U.S.	
60	Loss	49–11	Mickey Walker	NWS	12	Mar 22, 1923	113th Regiment Armory, Newark, New Jersey, U.S.	NYSAC and NBA welterweight titles at stake; (via KO only)
59	Loss	49–10	Frankie Schoell	NWS	10	Feb 19, 1923	South Main Street Armory, Wilkes-Barre, Pennsylvania, U.S.	
58	Win	49–9	Johnny Karr	NWS	12	Feb 15, 1923	Oak Hill Auditorium, Youngstown, Ohio, U.S.	
57	Win	48–9	Johnny Nichols	UD	12	Feb 9, 1923	Madison Square Garden, New York City, New York, U.S.	
56	Win	47–9	Paul Doyle	UD	10	Feb 6, 1923	Mechanics Building, Boston, Massachusetts, U.S.	
55	Win	46–9	Georgie Ward	NWS	12	Jan 16, 1923	Broad A.C., Newark, New Jersey, U.S.	
54	Win	45–9	Sailor Friedman	NWS	8	Dec 11, 1922	Arena, Philadelphia, Pennsylvania, U.S.	
53	Win	44–9	Tim Droney	NWS	10	Nov 30, 1922	Town Hall, Scranton, Pennsylvania, U.S.	
52	Win	43–9	Georgie Ward	NWS	10	Nov 9, 1922	Town Hall, Scranton, Pennsylvania, U.S.	
51	Loss	42–9	Eddie Shevlin	NWS	10	Oct 16, 1922	South Main Street Armory, Wilkes-Barre, Pennsylvania, U.S.	
50	Win	42–8	Frankie Schoell	NWS	10	Oct 3, 1922	Crystal Palace, Rocky Glen, Pennsylvania, U.S.	
49	Win	41–8	Bermondsey Billy Wells	NWS	10	Aug 10, 1922	Town Hall, Scranton, Pennsylvania, U.S.	
48	Loss	40–8	Paul Doyle	NWS	10	Jul 25, 1922	Town Hall, Scranton, Pennsylvania, U.S.	
47	Win	40–7	Dave Shade	NWS	10	May 17, 1922	South Main Street Armory, Wilkes-Barre, Pennsylvania, U.S.	
46	Win	39–7	Marty Summers	NWS	10	May 4, 1922	Town Hall, Scranton, Pennsylvania, U.S.	
45	Win	38–7	Al Brown	NWS	10	Apr 6, 1922	Town Hall, Scranton, Pennsylvania, U.S.	
44	Win	37–7	Jack Palmer	NWS	10	Mar 31, 1922	Feeley Hall, Hazleton, Pennsylvania, U.S.	
43	Win	36–7	Jack Palmer	PTS	8	Feb 3, 1922	Madison Square Garden, New York City, New York, U.S.	
42	Loss	35–7	Frankie Schoell	NWS	10	Jan 26, 1922	Town Hall, Scranton, Pennsylvania, U.S.	
41	Win	35–6	Al Norton	NWS	10	Jan 12, 1922	Town Hall, Scranton, Pennsylvania, U.S.	
40	Win	34–6	Jack Palmer	NWS	10	Dec 23, 1921	Town Hall, Scranton, Pennsylvania, U.S.	
39	Win	33–6	Tim Droney	NWS	10	Nov 3, 1921	South Main Street Armory, Wilkes-Barre, Pennsylvania, U.S.	
38	Win	32–6	Jimmy Sullivan	TKO	7 (8)	Oct 31, 1921	Olympia A.C., Philadelphia, Pennsylvania, U.S.	
37	Win	31–6	Barney Adair	NWS	10	Oct 28, 1921	Town Hall, Scranton, Pennsylvania, U.S.	
36	Win	30–6	Tim Droney	NWS	10	Oct 15, 1921	South Main Street Armory, Wilkes-Barre, Pennsylvania, U.S.	
35	Win	29–6	Nick Moon	KO	6 (10)	Oct 13, 1921	Town Hall, Scranton, Pennsylvania, U.S.	
34	Win	28–6	Harry Turner	KO	2 (10)	Sep 9, 1921	Town Hall, Scranton, Pennsylvania, U.S.	
33	Win	27–6	Johnny Herman	NWS	10	Sep 2, 1921	Feeley Hall, Hazleton, Pennsylvania, U.S.	
32	Win	26–6	Tim Droney	NWS	10	Aug 4, 1921	Athletic Park, Scranton, Pennsylvania, U.S.	
31	Win	25–6	Jake Schiffer	KO	1 (10)	Jun 29, 1921	Athletic Park, Scranton, Pennsylvania, U.S.	
30	Win	24–6	Bud Logan	NWS	8	Jun 6, 1921	Federal League Baseball Park, Harrison, New Jersey, U.S.	
29	Win	23–6	Sammy Berne	NWS	10	May 10, 1921	Athletic Park, Scranton, Pennsylvania, U.S.	
28	Win	22–6	Benny Cohen	NWS	?	May 4, 1921	Morristown, New Jersey, U.S.	
27	Win	21–6	George Reynolds	NWS	10	Apr 14, 1921	Town Hall, Scranton, Pennsylvania, U.S.	
26	Win	20–6	Westside Jimmy Duffy	UD	12	Apr 4, 1921	Victory Hall, Johnson City, New York, U.S.	
25	Win	19–6	Al Dewey	NWS	10	Jan 17, 1921	South Main Street Armory, Wilkes-Barre, Pennsylvania, U.S.	
24	Win	18–6	Ren Carlin	TKO	7 (10)	Dec 25, 1920	Freeland Opera House, Freeland, Pennsylvania, U.S.	
23	Win	17–6	Jimmy Shevlin	NWS	10	Dec 15, 1920	South Main Street Armory, Wilkes-Barre, Pennsylvania, U.S.	
22	Loss	16–6	Frankie Venchell	NWS	10	Nov 15, 1920	South Main Street Armory, Wilkes-Barre, Pennsylvania, U.S.	
21	Win	16–5	Willie Ritchie	NWS	10	Oct 14, 1920	Town Hall, Scranton, Pennsylvania, U.S.	
20	Win	15–5	George Reynolds	NWS	10	Sep 17, 1920	Lapchack's Hall, Hazleton, Pennsylvania, U.S.	
19	Win	14–5	Johnny Mahoney	NWS	10	Aug 17, 1920	Feeley Hall, Hazleton, Pennsylvania, U.S.	
18	Loss	13–5	Al Murphy	NWS	10	Jun 25, 1920	Athletic Park, Scranton, Pennsylvania, U.S.	
17	Loss	13–4	Willie Ritchie	NWS	10	May 26, 1920	Town Hall, Scranton, Pennsylvania, U.S.	
16	Win	13–3	George Reynolds	NWS	10	Apr 15, 1920	Boone Hall, St. Clair, Pennsylvania, U.S.	
15	Win	12–3	Joe O'Neill	NWS	10	Mar 11, 1920	Town Hall, Scranton, Pennsylvania, U.S.	
14	Win	11–3	Al Reynolds	NWS	10	Mar 8, 1920	Charlton's Hall, Pottsville, Pennsylvania, U.S.	
13	Win	10–3	Al Reynolds	NWS	8	Feb 23, 1920	Charlton's Hall, Pottsville, Pennsylvania, U.S.	
12	Loss	9–3	Joe O'Neill	NWS	10	Feb 13, 1920	Town Hall, Scranton, Pennsylvania, U.S.	
11	Win	9–2	Frankie McCarthy	TKO	6 (10)	Jan 29, 1920	Town Hall, Scranton, Pennsylvania, U.S.	
10	Win	8–2	Mickey Malloy	KO	3 (10)	Jan 1, 1920	Town Hall, Scranton, Pennsylvania, U.S.	
9	Win	7–2	Joe Sugars	NWS	6	Dec 29, 1919	Armory, Plymouth, Pennsylvania, U.S.	
8	Loss	6–2	Joe Sugars	NWS	6	Oct 17, 1919	Nesbitt Theatre, Wilkes-Barre, Pennsylvania, U.S.	
7	Loss	6–1	Billy Gannon	NWS	6	Sep 27, 1919	National A.C., Philadelphia, Pennsylvania, U.S.	
6	Win	6–0	Willie DeHaut	KO	2 (6)	May 8, 1919	Town Hall, Scranton, Pennsylvania, U.S.	
5	Win	5–0	K O Grant	KO	2 (4)	Apr 7, 1919	Nesbitt Theatre, Wilkes-Barre, Pennsylvania, U.S.	
4	Win	4–0	Eddie Milhelm	KO	2 (4)	Mar 31, 1919	Nesbitt Theatre, Wilkes-Barre, Pennsylvania, U.S.	
3	Win	3–0	Jake Henry	NWS	6	Mar 13, 1919	Town Hall, Scranton, Pennsylvania, U.S.	
2	Win	2–0	Silent Cawley	NWS	6	Feb 27, 1919	Town Hall, Scranton, Pennsylvania, U.S.	
1	Win	1–0	Red Ferguson	TKO	3 (6)	Feb 13, 1919	Town Hall, Scranton, Pennsylvania, U.S.	

== Titles in boxing ==
=== Major world titles ===
- NYSAC welterweight champion (147 lbs)
- NBA (WBA) welterweight champion (147 lbs)

=== The Ring magazine titles ===
- The Ring welterweight champion (147 lbs)

=== Undisputed titles ===
- Undisputed welterweight champion

== See also ==
- List of welterweight boxing champions

Achievements
Preceded by Mickey Walker	World Welterweight Champion; May 20, 1926 – June 3, 1927	Succeeded by Joe Dundee
