= Willie Harmon =

American boxer

Personal information
- Nationality: (United States) American
- Born: April 20, 1899 New York, New York
- Height: 5 ft 7 in (1.70 m)
- Weight: Welterweight

Boxing career
- Stance: Orthodox

Boxing record
- Total fights: 93
- Wins: 70
- Win by KO: 24
- Losses: 13
- Draws: 9
- No contests: 1

Willie Harmon (born April 20, 1899) was an American boxer in the welterweight division. Harmon was a top welterweight contender for a number of years in the mid-1920s. He was ranked as the #6 welterweight in the world for 1925 by The Ring magazine.

== Early life and career ==
Harmon was born on April 20, 1899, to Jewish parents in New York's Lower East Side.

He defeated Pinky Mitchell, reigning junior-welterweight world champion, in Milwaukee on August 14, 1925, by newspaper decision in a non-title bout over ten rounds. A few publications listed the bout as a draw. The event was made memorable by Mitchell returning his purse, claiming he fought too poorly to have earned it. Despite being a non-title bout, Harmon claimed Mitchell's NYSAC title after Mitchell temporarily moved up to welterweight shortly after the bout.

Nate Goldman, fellow Jewish boxer, became a second-round knockout victim at Madison Square Garden on New Year's day 1926. Goldman was actually knocked out in the first round, but the count was interrupted by the bell. The full count was made in the second.

He lost to Joe Dundee on May 28, 1926, by a ten-round points decision in Brooklyn. Due to the contestants' mutual respect for the other's gifts, the bout was slow and fought cautiously with frequent clinching.

== Contending for the World Welterweight title, June, 1926 ==
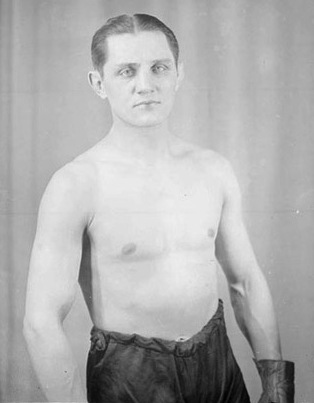
Champion Pete Latzo

On June 29, 1926, he challenged champion Pete Latzo for the world welterweight title. The fight took place outdoors in Dreamland Park, in Newark, New Jersey. While Harmon weighed in at 144.5 lbs, Latzo weighed in at 153 lbs—6 lbs over the 147-lb welterweight limit. Although Harmon fought valiantly, and won the earlier rounds, he was knocked cold by the champion in the fifth round, and lay unconscious for several minutes. A thundering right by Latzo scored the final knockout.

On January 14, 1927, he beat Myer Cohen in a seventh round technical knockout at Madison Square Garden.

He drew with Texan Tommy White in ten rounds on April 5, 1927, at Madison Square Garden. Harmon took an advantage in the first few rounds, but White countered in the bout's mid rounds. The final rounds were fought more aggressively as both boxers tried to gain an edge in points.

He won a ten round newspaper decision against Billy Alger on July 20, 1927, in Newark, New Jersey, though several newspapers reported the bout as a draw.

He lost to Vince Dundee, future World Middleweight champion, in a ten round decision on August 1, 1927, in Baltimore. The bout was fought with great caution by both boxers, and the crowd yelled accusations of "fake" in the late rounds. Many ringside, including the reporter for the Baltimore Sun, felt Harmon, not Dundee, deserved the decision.
