= Eddie Roberts (boxer) =

American boxer

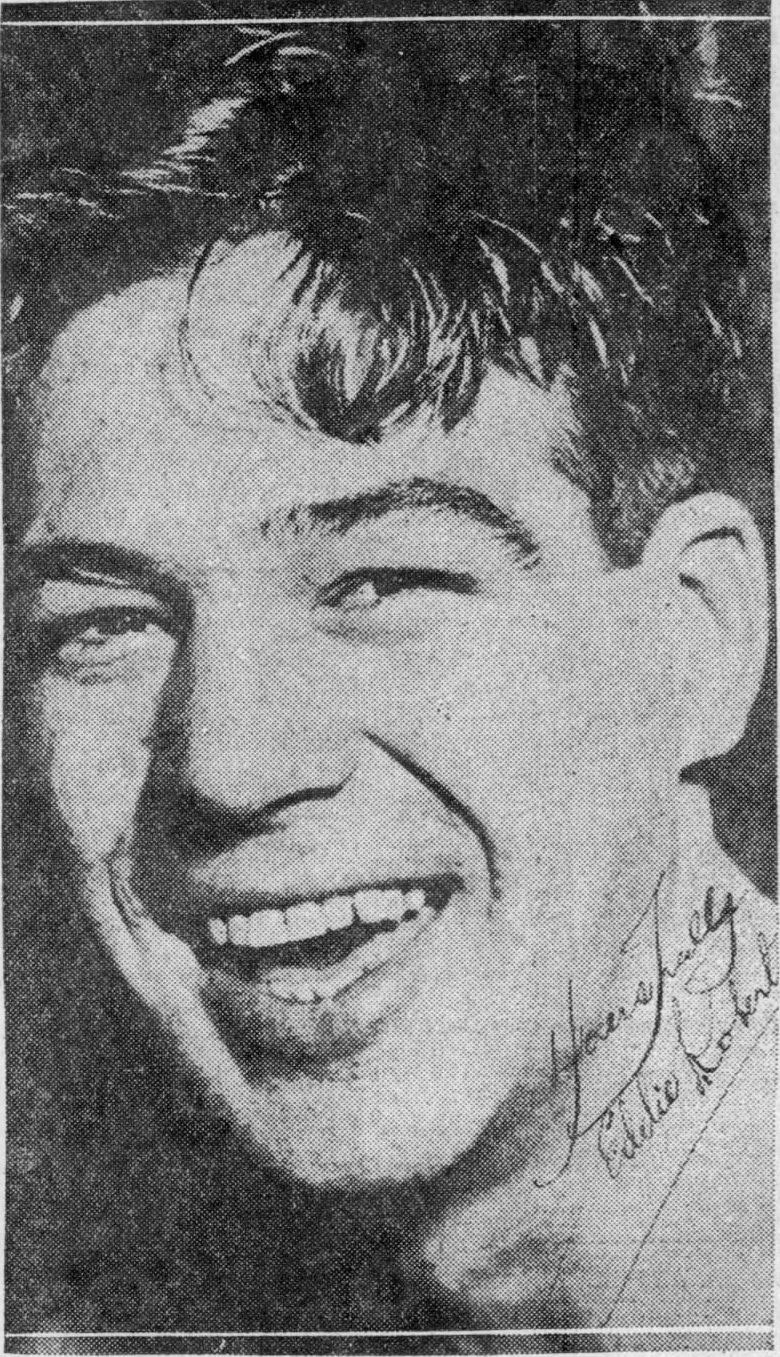
- headshot of Eddie Roberts, published on December 16, 1928

Personal information
- Nicknames: K.O.; Knockout; Kayo; Tacoma Tagger; Tacoma Terror; Tacoma Terrier; Tacoma Tiger; Race Horse
- Born: Edwin Lionel Rowland Anacortes, Washington, US
- Height: 5 ft 7 in; 5 ft 10½ in

Boxing career
- Weight class: Welterweight; Middleweight
- Reach: 74 in (188 cm)

Boxing record
- Total fights: 93
- Wins: 62
- Win by KO: 24
- Losses: 21
- Draws: 10

Edward Robertson (born as Edwin Lionel Rowland) (January 20, 1903 – March 3, 1968), better known as Eddie Roberts, was an American Welterweight/Middleweight boxer, actor and a World War I, World War II and Korean War veteran who competed from 1922 to 1931. He held the title of Pacific Northwest Welterweight Champion and was a serious contender for the World Welterweight championship in 1926–1927.

== Early life ==
Eddie Roberts was born on January 20, 1903, in Anacortes, Washington to father Edwin Luther Rowland of Scotch-Irish parentage, the owner of a Livery and transport business and a City Marshal, and mother Mamie Kreamen of German parentage, a housewife. The youngest of two brothers, he lived in Anacortes up until at least the age of 7, reportedly he later grew up in Alameda. His father died when Roberts was seven years old due to a broken neck in an automobile accident. Roberts attended Whitney Primary School. Roberts filled his draft registration card under a fake name on September 12, 1918, at the age of 15. Roberts was a fireman on the USS Chicago, USS Milwaukee and the SS Saint Paul. He joined the United States Navy on February 17, 1919 and was stationed at the Brooklyn Navy Yard after which being moved to the battleship USS Arkansas in Guantánamo Bay in 1920 at the latest and gaining the rank of fireman and afterwards water tender. On November 27, 1929, Roberts married Agnes Serene Anderson.

== Amateur career ==
While serving on the USS Arkansas as a Master-at-arms, Roberts' boxing skills were noticed by his fellow sailors, who often engaged in friendly sparring matches with him. His impressive performance in these matches caught the attention of the ship's athletic director, who saw his potential as a competitive boxer. With the encouragement of his the athletic director, Roberts decided to join the Atlantic Squadron fistic competition. Roberts' decision to join the competition turned out to be a wise one, as he quickly rose through the ranks and eventually won the middleweight championship of the navy.

== Professional career ==
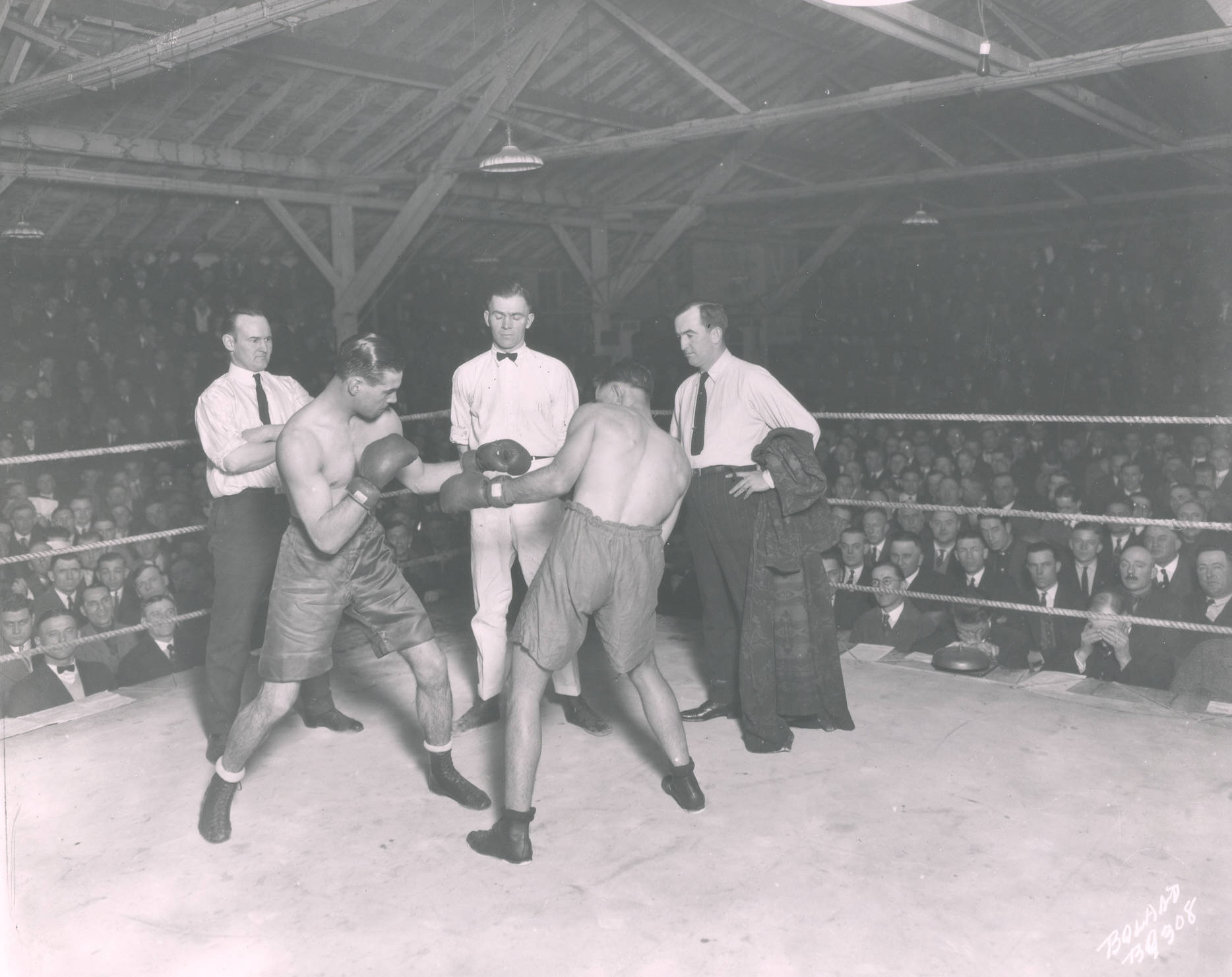
Eddie Roberts vs Gene Cline, January 24, 1924

Roberts left the Navy and asked Jack Connors in late 1921 if Connors would be his coach (Connors was also the coach of future Welterweight World champion, Freddie Steele and briefly the coach of the future 15th governor of Washington Albert Rosellini), Connors accepted, Roberts left the Navy and had his professional debut on September 2, 1922, at the age of 19 in the Welterweight weight class with a win against Fred Kelly. Roberts' popularity and skill grew quickly, and by 1923, he was participating in main event fights like the one at the now Kaiser Convention Center against Oakland Jimmy Duffy.

On March 6, 1924, Roberts became the Pacific Northwest Welterweight Champion after winning against Ted Krache in a round six points decision, 19 days later he lost the title to Bobby Harper but later regained it after winning against Harper on November 20, 1924. Roberts lost the title again 19 days later and never regained it.

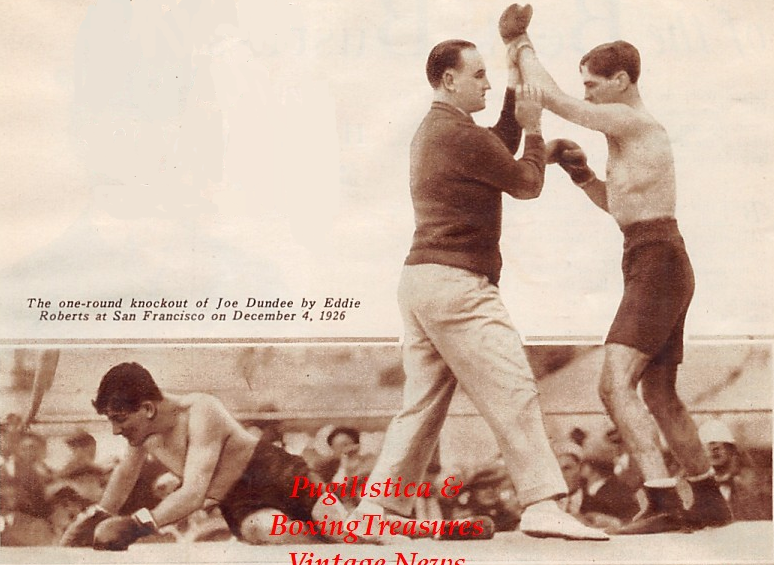
Roberts's knockout of Joe Dundee, December 4, 1926

The most notable event of Roberts's career was on December 4, 1926, where he fought against Joe Dundee and won in a first-round knockout after only 4 seconds earning him 400 dollars and a great deal of publicity. However, he lost the rematch in a ten-round unanimous decision a month later in front of over 18,000 spectators in Madison Square Garden. Dundee later became World Welterweight Champion.

On March 22, 1927, Roberts won a bout against Olympic athlete Jack Zivic with a round twelve-points decision.

On April 4, 1927, Roberts lost a bout against Olympic athlete Al Mello with a round-one knockout.

At the end of 1927, Roberts was seventh place in the Welterweight division.

On March 12, 1928, Roberts lost a bout against future Welterweight and Middleweight champion Young Corbett III with a round-nine knockout.

On February 7, 1930, Roberts had a draw with Gorilla Jones after fighting for ten rounds.

== Retirement from boxing and acting career ==
On August 19, 1931, at the age of 28, Roberts sustained two small fractures of the jaw, this occurred during his bout with Buddy Gorman. This incident was the catalyst that pushed Roberts into his retirement from boxing, aside from a few bouts here and there in the coming years.

Roberts had started his acting career in 1929 when he starred in the film Follow the Leader where he played a gangster. Roberts later appeared in several movies (see below) and also a series of boxing commercials by Al Christie alongside Buster West and Tom Patricola. In 1934 Roberts became an athletic instructor for Hecht-MacArthur Productions.

=== Filmography ===
Year	Title	Role	Source
1930	Follow the Leader	Valet	
1930	Roadhouse Nights		
1930	Model Women	Mover Mike	
1931	Masquerade	Cafe Customer	
1931	The Naggers at the Ringside	Eddie Robberts	
1933	Broadway Brevities #18: World's Champ		
1933	Hizzoner	Mayor's chauffeur	
1933	Million Dollar Melody	The Tough Guy	
1933	The Good Bad Man	Kidnapper	
1934	The Knife of the Party	Bit Role	
1934	The Wrong Bottle	Car salesman	
1934	Hotel Anchovy	Suicidal Hotel Guest	
1934	Sea Sore	Stewart	
1934	Hello Sailors	Sailor	
1934	The Expectant Father	Expectant Father in Waiting Room	
1935	Mr. Widget	Person asking for a lighter	
1936	The Screen Test		
1937	Freshies	Chauffeur	
1937	On Such a Night		
1937	Some Blondes Are Dangerous	Rattler O'Keefe	
1937	Submarine D-1	Pharmacist's Mate (uncredited)	
1937	Love on Toast		

== Additional info and life after boxing career ==
In 1932 Roberts was the owner if a Nightclub near San Francisco after his retirement from boxing, in 1935 he sold it.

In 1933, Roberts was working as a bartender in San Francisco.

In late 1933, Roberts was a bartender aboard the Dollar Liner SS President Hoover in the Trans-Pacific trade.

In 1936–1937, Roberts was the owner of a night club/cocktail lounge/tavern on Mason Street in San Francisco.

In 1940, Roberts was working as a bartender in a hotel lounge in Redding.

Roberts loved to hunt and fish and planned to build an outing resort in California.

In 1942 at the age of 39, Roberts lived in San Francisco and enlisted in the Navy on July 16, 1942. He was reassigned the rank of water tender and fought in World War II until June 22, 1945, serving first on the USS Bache, USS Houston, starting December 20, 1943, and the USS Mobile starting October 17, 1944.

In 1947, Roberts was a bartender in San Francisco

In 1950, Roberts was again working as a bartender in Seattle.

Between 1950 and early 1953, Roberts fought in the Korean War on the USNS David C. Shanks, SS Brazil Victory, SS Otis L. Hall as a watertender, on the American SS Fairisle as a deck engineer and on the SS Royal Oak and SS Mankato Victory as an oiler.

On July 19, 1954, Roberts married Colletta M. Johnson in San Francisco.

In 1955, Roberts was working on the SS Young America as an oiler.

In 1957, Roberts was living in Nome, Alaska as a bartender.

Edward Roberts died on March 3, 1968, in Alameda at the age of 65. and was buried in Willamette National Cemetery under his fake name and birth date.

== Style of play ==
Roberts was a counter fighter with a strong short left hook who refused to play aggressively until his opponent was weakened.

Jack Conners in reference to Roberts's toughness told the Oakland Tribune "He had the toughest skin i ever saw on a fighter. No cauliflower ears, no cut lips or flattened nose".

== Personal life ==
Roberts changed his name from Edward Lionel Rowland to Eddie/Edward Roberts for "fighting purposes" based on the character "Kid" Roberts by H. C. Witwer.

Roberts was married multiple times but had no children.

== Professional boxing record ==
All information in this section is derived from BoxRec, unless otherwise stated.

=== Official record ===
93 fights	62 wins	21 losses
By knockout	24	6
By decision	37	13
By disqualification	1	2
Draws	10	

== Gallery ==
Eddie Roberts (in chronological order)

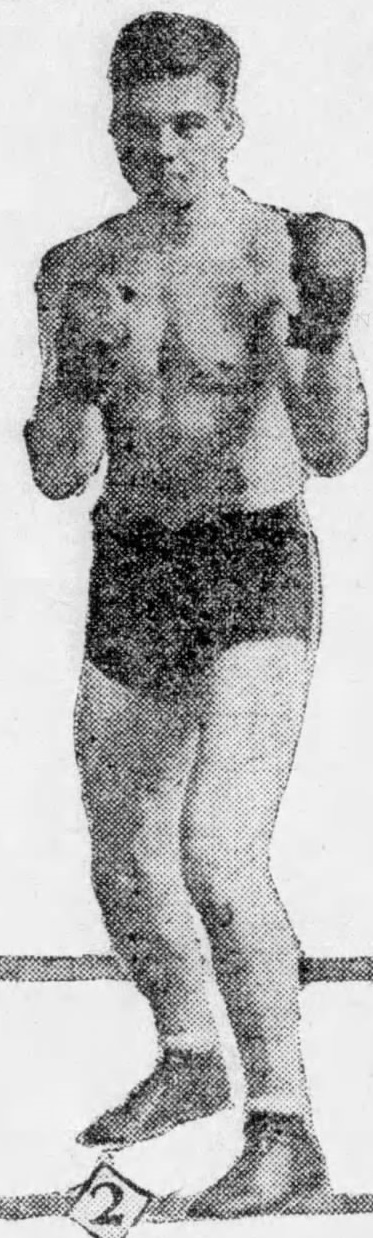
Eddie Roberts in his boxing outfit March 19, 1922

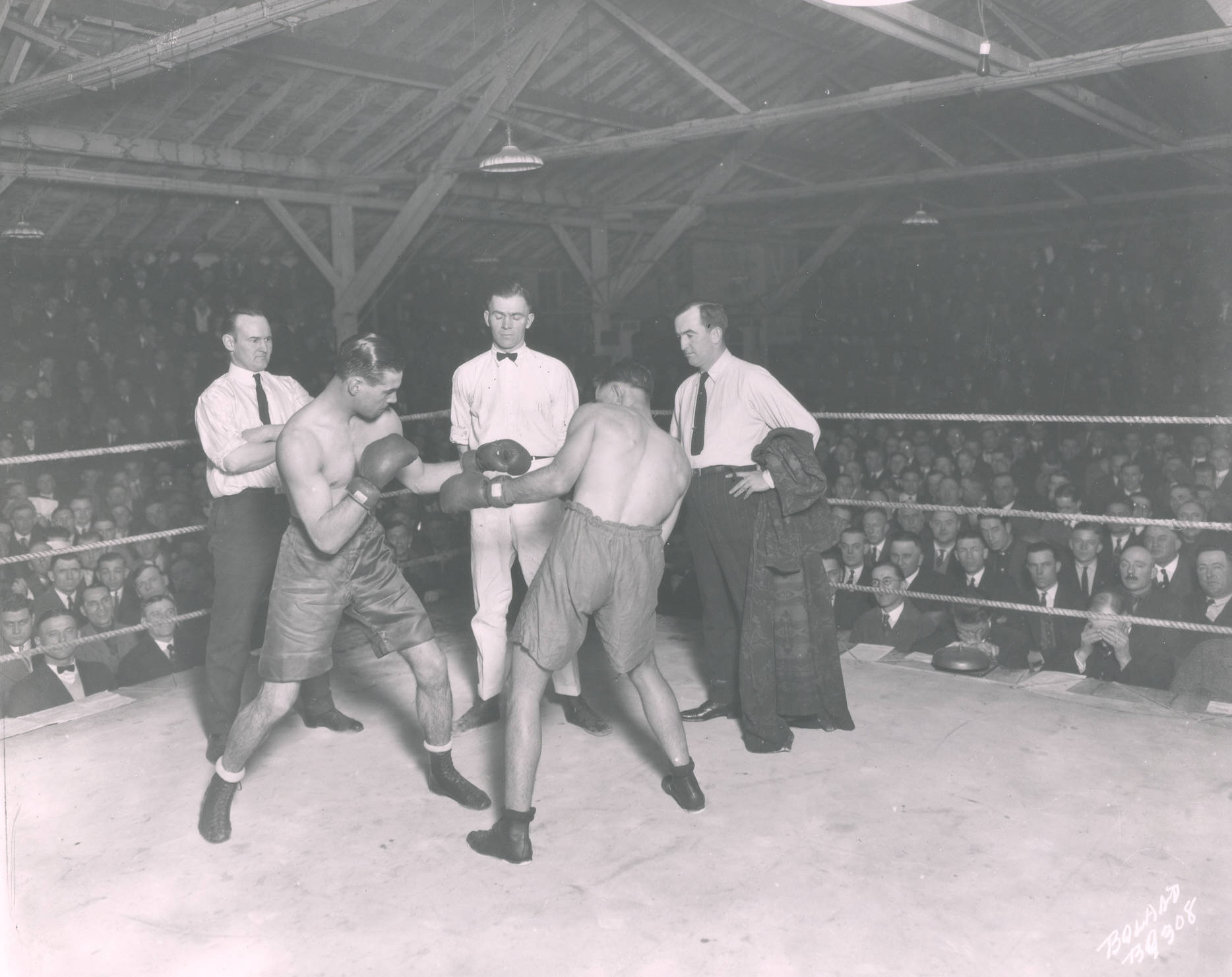
Eddie Roberts vs Gene Cline January 24, 1924

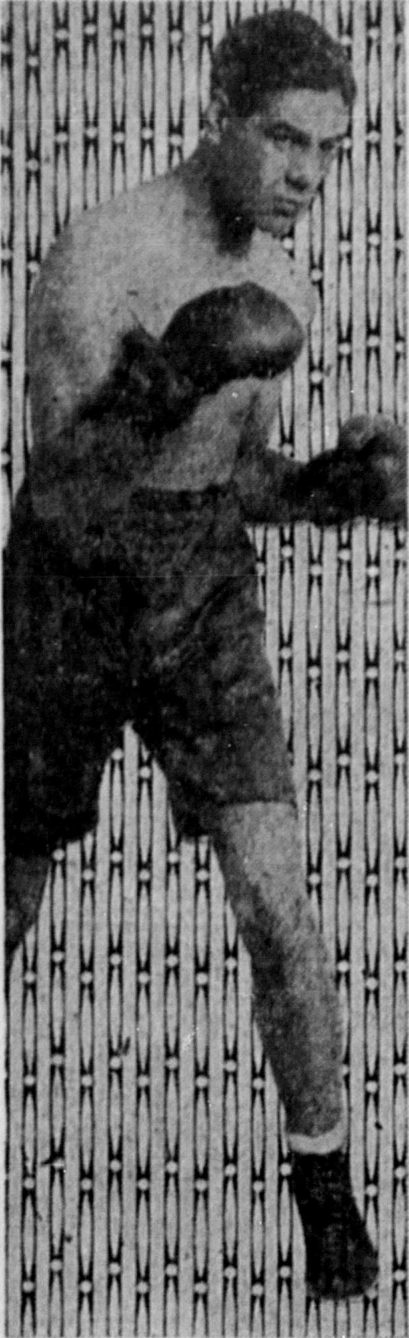
Picture of Roberts in his boxing outfit February 16, 1924

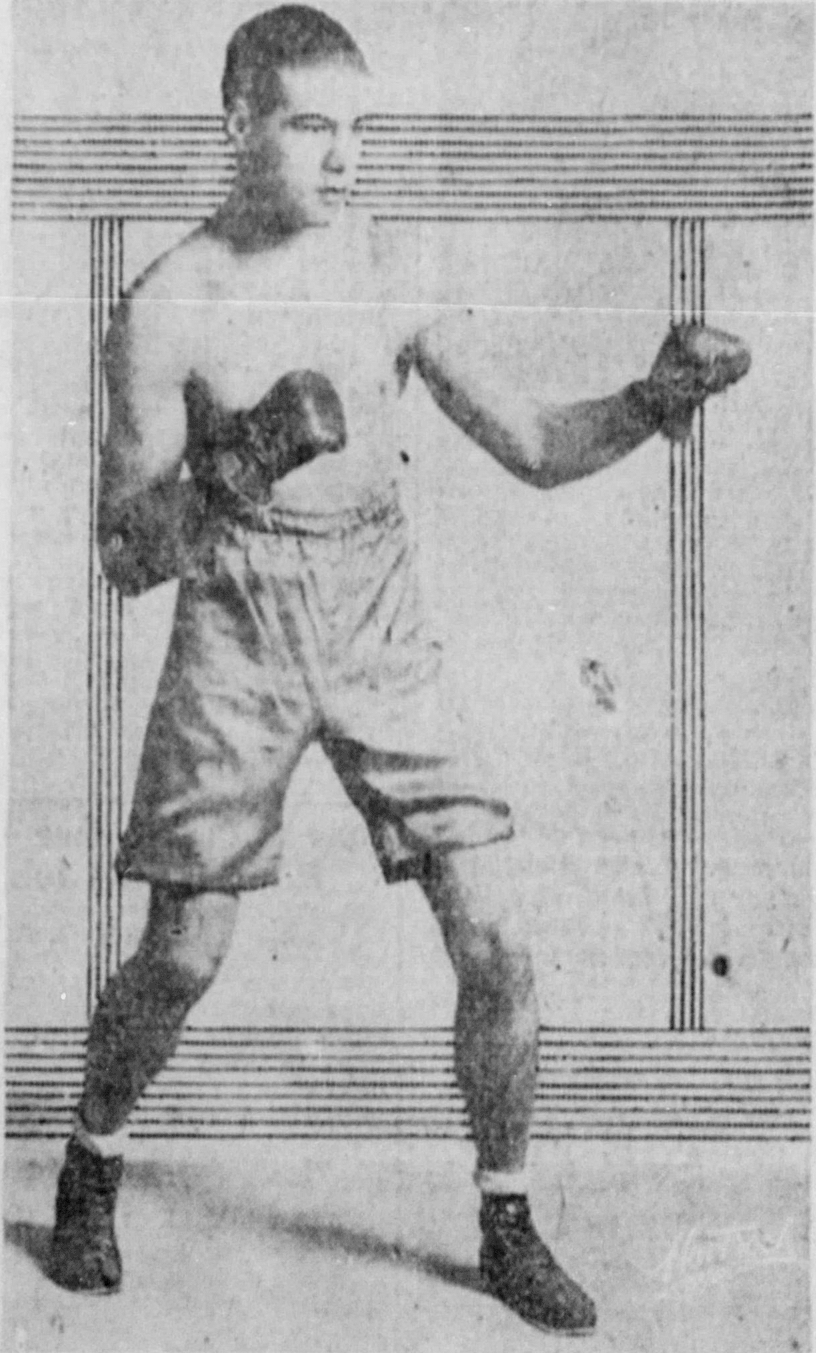
Eddie Roberts wearing his boxing outfit. March 22, 1924

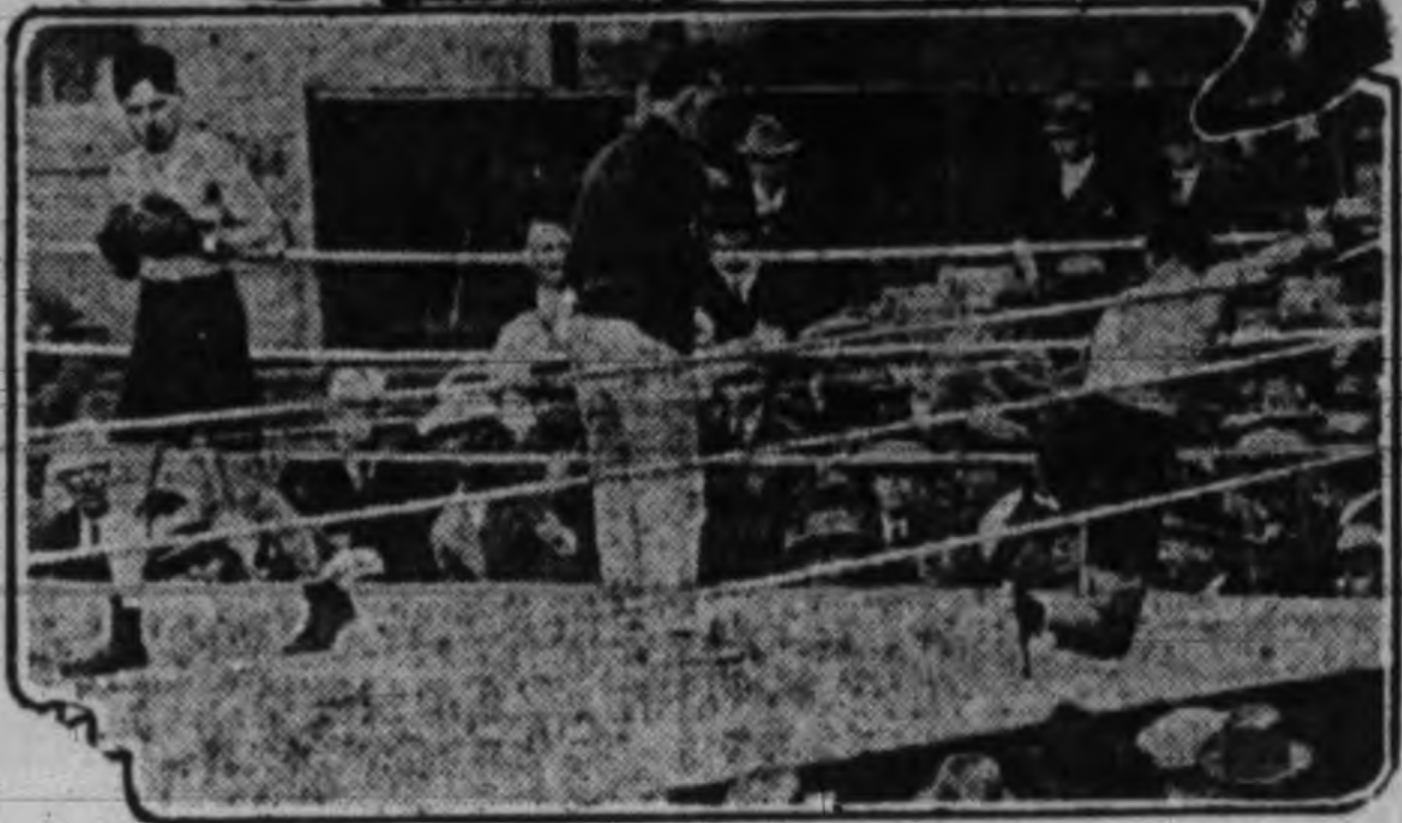
Roberts's knockout of Joe Dundee December 4, 1926

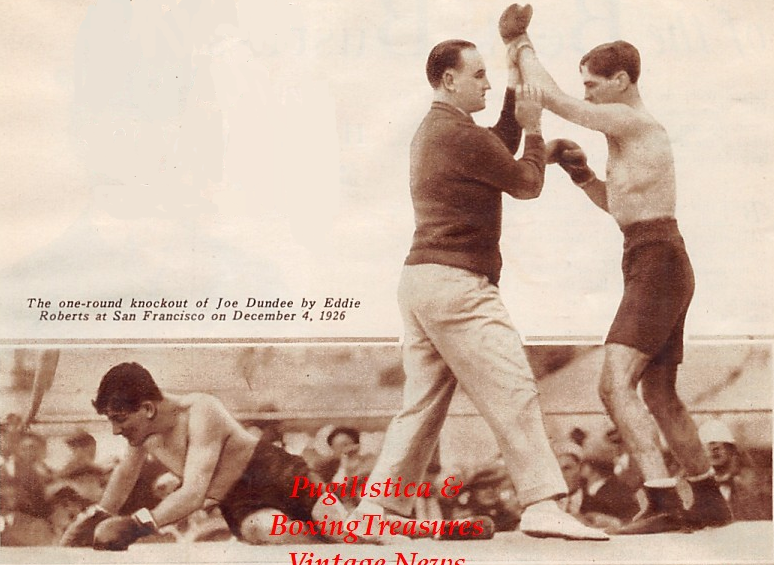
Roberts's knockout of Joe Dundee December 4, 1926

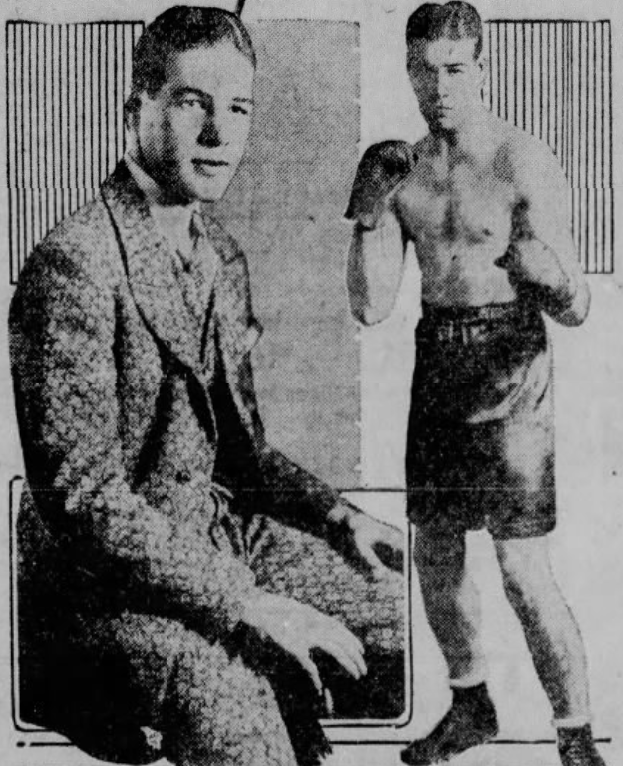
2 pictures of Eddie Roberts (boxer). one of him in a suit and another of him with his boxing equipment on December 22, 1926

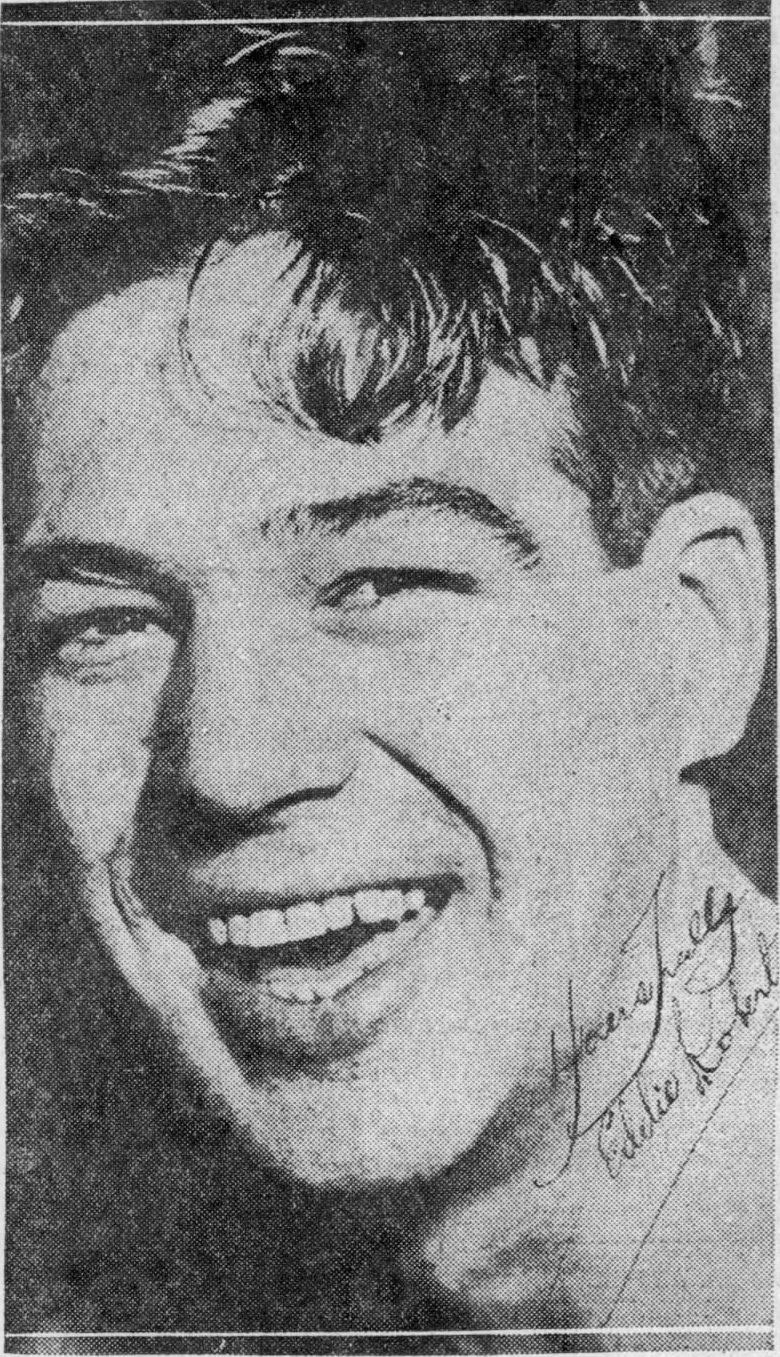
headshot of Eddie Roberts, published on December 16, 1928

Frame from the movie short 'Hotel Anchovy' showcasing Eddie Roberts. April 13, 1934

Frame from the movie short 'Sea Sore' showcasing Eddie Roberts. April 20, 1934
