= Joe Dundee =

American boxer (1903–1982)

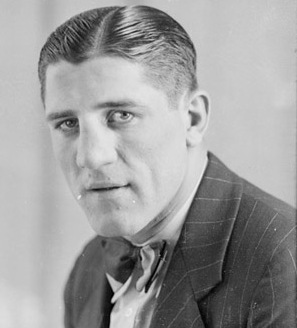

Personal information
- Nationality: American
- Born: Salvatore Lazzara; August 6, 1903 Palermo, Sicily, Italy
- Died: March 31, 1982 (aged 78) Baltimore, Maryland, U.S.
- Height: 5 ft 7 in (1.70 m)
- Weight: Welterweight

Boxing career

Boxing record
- Total fights: 129; With the inclusion of newspaper decisions
- Wins: 92
- Win by KO: 25
- Losses: 23
- Draws: 12
- No contests: 2

Salvatore Lazzara (August 6, 1903 – March 31, 1982), better known by his boxing alias Joe Dundee, was an American boxer. He was the brother of Middleweight Champion Vince Dundee. During his career, he was recognized as the Undisputed World Welterweight Champion from 1927 to 1929. Dundee's managers included Max Waxman, and Charles Johnston, and his trainer was Heinie Blaustein.

== Early life ==
Dundee was born Salvatore Lazzara in Palermo, Sicily, Italy on August 16, 1903. He was tutored at St. Mary's Industrial School in Baltimore, where his family moved when he was a young boy.

== Career ==
Dundee began professional boxing in 1919 in Baltimore, In an important early career loss, Dundee was disqualified in a match with former world bantamweight champion Kid Williams on September 4, 1922, in Baltimore, Maryland. Williams was leading by a large margin when the bout was called, excelling in the infighting, and landing nearly every blow imaginable against Dundee. Nearly a month later, Dundee married Johanna Kozojet at St. Wenceslaus Church.

One of his most noteworthy bouts was a ten round draw by decision with Lew Tendler before 10,000 on July 16, 1925, at Pennsylvania's Shibe Park. In a close and furiously fought bout in the rain, Dundee caught Tendler off balance in the ninth with a left hook, and he fell briefly to his hands. Dundee frequently fought on offense against Tendler, staggering him at times with a stunning right. The skilled ring veteran Tendler was forced to clinch at times.

Tommy Freeman fell to Dundee on March 1, 1926, in a fifth round technical knockout at Madison Square Garden, furthering Dundee's rise to the top of the welterweight ranks.

He defeated Jewish Brooklyn-based boxer George Levine in a ten round points decision at Madison Square Garden on May 8, 1926. The fight was action packed from the beginning, though there were no knockdowns. Levine scored well and kept Dundee at a distance with a left jab in the first four rounds, while Dundee went to the body in the fifth with his right and wore down his opponent in the remaining rounds. Reporters recognized Dundee as a top two contender for the welterweight title and Self Defense magazine rated Levine in the top ten for welterweights that year.

Dundee decisively defeated former world welterweight champion Mickey Walker on June 24, 1926, in an eighth round technical knockout before 15,000 at New York's Madison Square Garden. Walker was battered throughout the bout, and was able to lead the only in the first, which he may have won on points. Dundee aimed frequently at an injured eye, which Walker had gotten in training prior to the match. The referee stopped the bout 2:53 into the eighth when bleeding from Walker's injured eye and the battering he had taken made it impossible for him to continue. The win against Walker spotlighted Dundee's ascension to the top ranks of welterweight contenders.

In an important early career win, Dundee defeated Jack Zivic in a ten round points decision on October 15, 1926, before a crowd of 12,000 at Madison Square Garden. Dundee was given seven rounds, with two to Zivic, and one even. Dundee boxed carefully against a well known opponent, delivering hard rights to the body, and left hooks to the jaw. He fought through the frequent clinches of Zivic, and fought in close when necessary on the breaks.

Eddie Roberts fell to Dundee in a decisive ten round unanimous decision on January 14, 1927, before a crowd of 18,000 at Madison Square Garden. Roberts took frequent blows to the body that exhausted him, and helped give Dundee an edge. Dundee was down briefly in the fourth from a right cross and may have been close to a knockout, but recovered and fought back gamely in the remaining rounds. The Associated Press gave Dundee eight rounds and Roberts two. In a previous match on December 4, 1926, Dundee lost in a first round technical knockout to Roberts after he was floored four times in the first.

=== Taking the world welterweight title, June, 1927 ===
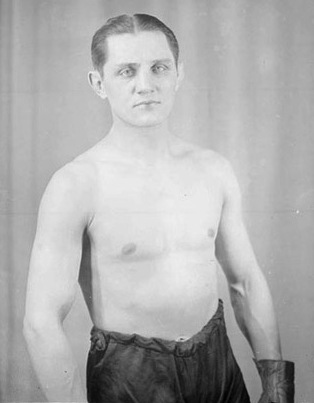
Champion Pete Latzo

Dundee defeated Pete Latzo for the world welterweight title on June 3, 1927, at New York's Polo Grounds, winning in a fifteen round majority decision before one of his largest audiences, an impressive crowd of 30,000. In a fairly decisive win, the Associated Press gave Dundee ten of the fifteen rounds, building his largest points margin in the later rounds. Latzo started strong, looking best in the first, second, fourth, and twelfth, but took brutal body punishment, particularly to the kidneys, through much of the bout. By the tenth, gaining confidence and sensing victory, Dundee went to Latzo's head as well as his body with greater frequency. Several reporters attributed Latzo's lack of endurance in the later rounds to his difficulty making the 147 pound welterweight limit.

Dundee fought a peculiar bout with former world light welterweight champion Pinky Mitchell on August 11, 1927, in Milwaukee that was declared a No Contest, and discontinued in the sixth round for stalling. The Wisconsin Boxing Commission barred both boxers from competing in their state until January 1, 1928. Though warned against the continuous holding and clinching for five rounds, both competitors persisted until the referee ended the contest before a booing crowd of 5,000. What little fighting there was appeared to leave the fighters on even terms.

Dundee lost to future welterweight champion Jack Thompson on August 30, 1928, in a second round technical knockout at Comiskey Park in Chicago. Though the first appeared even, in the second, Dundee was down first for a count of nine from a right cross, and again for a nine count from a flurry of punches before the referee stopped the bout. Thompson would have taken the title due to the knockout, but for a weight discrepancy during the weigh-in, which removed the bout from title contention.

=== Loss of the world welterweight title, July, 1929 ===
On March 21, 1929, Dundee was stripped of his NBA world welterweight title for refusing to fight top contenders Jack Thompson or Jackie Fields. He was not considered to have fully lost the title until his bout with Jackie Fields.

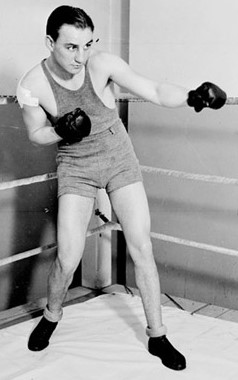
Jackie Fields

On July 25, 1929, Dundee faced Jackie Fields before a crowd of 25,000 in a unifying match for the welterweight championship in Detroit, and a chance to reclaim his title. Fields was awarded the fight in the second round after Dundee, having been knocked down four times, delivered a foul blow while still down which left put fields down on the mat in pain, and incapable of continuing the fight. Dundee claimed that the foul was unintentional but some boxing historians has since speculated otherwise, even considering it part of a fix. Fields stated he believed Dundee, but noted that it was the only bout he had ever won on a foul. The win gave Fields unified recognition as world welterweight champion.

=== Taking the Mexican welterweight title, October, 1929 ===
Dundee defeated Bert Colima on October 13, 1929, for the Mexican welterweight title in a ten round points decision in Mexico City before an exceptional crowd of 20,000. Dundee was down for a count of nine in the second, and Colima was down twice in the sixth, once for a count of eight. Dundee dominated the later rounds, but could not find a knockout punch.

In one of his last career fights on May 28, 1930, Dundee decisively defeated British lightweight champion Harry Mason in a ten round points decision at Madison Square Garden before a modest crowd of 5,000. Though Dundee appeared close to being knocked out in the first round, he rallied in the remaining rounds to gain the decision from Mason.

After retiring from boxing around 1931, Dundee worked as a bartender in Baltimore in a tavern in which he had partial ownership.

Dundee was inducted into the Maryland State Athletic Hall of Fame in 1959. He died on March 31, 1982, at Manor Care Townson Nursing Home in Baltimore, and was buried in The Most Holy Redeemer Cemetery. He left a wife, Johanna, and three sons.

== Professional boxing record ==
All information in this section is derived from BoxRec, unless otherwise stated.

=== Official record ===
129 fights	85 wins	22 losses
By knockout	25	6
By decision	59	14
By disqualification	1	2
Draws	11	
No contests	2	
Newspaper decisions/draws	9	

All newspaper decisions are officially regarded as “no decision” bouts and are not counted in the win/loss/draw column.

No.	Result	Record	Opponent	Type	Round	Date	Location	Notes
129	Loss	85–22–11 (11)	Ignacio Ara	KO	1 (10)	Feb 28, 1931	Arena Cristal, Havana, Cuba	
128	Win	85–21–11 (11)	Meyer Lichtenstein	PTS	10	Feb 16, 1931	104th Regiment Armory, Baltimore, Maryland, U.S.	
127	Loss	84–21–11 (11)	Pete Susky	KO	3 (10)	Oct 3, 1930	Watres Armory, Scranton, Pennsylvania, U.S.	
126	Loss	84–20–11 (11)	Ben Jeby	PTS	8	Sep 11, 1930	Yankee Stadium, New York City, New York, U.S.	
125	Draw	84–19–11 (11)	Buck McTiernan	PTS	10	Aug 11, 1930	Meyers Bowl, North Braddock, Pennsylvania, U.S.	
124	Win	84–19–10 (11)	Harry Mason	PTS	10	May 28, 1930	Madison Square Garden, New York City, New York, U.S.	
123	Win	83–19–10 (11)	Charlie Rosen	PTS	6	May 3, 1930	Ridgewood Grove, New York City, New York, U.S.	
122	Loss	82–19–10 (11)	Thomas Lawless	UD	10	Apr 14, 1930	Convention Hall, Rochester, New York, U.S.	
121	Loss	82–18–10 (11)	Ted Goodrich	TKO	2 (10)	Mar 18, 1930	Auditorium, Atlanta, Georgia, U.S.	
120	Win	82–17–10 (11)	Joe Trippe	PTS	10	Mar 3, 1930	Convention Hall, Rochester, New York, U.S.	
119	Loss	81–17–10 (11)	Paulie Walker	PTS	10	Feb 3, 1930	Arena, Philadelphia, Pennsylvania, U.S.	
118	Win	81–16–10 (11)	Billy Angelo	PTS	10	Nov 4, 1929	Arena, Philadelphia, Pennsylvania, U.S.	
117	Win	80–16–10 (11)	Bert Colima	PTS	10	Oct 13, 1929	El Toreo de Cuatro Caminos, Mexico City, Distrito Federal, Mexico	Won Mexico welterweight title
116	Loss	79–16–10 (11)	Jackie Fields	DQ	2 (15)	Jul 25, 1929	State Fairgrounds Arena, Detroit, Michigan, U.S.	Lost NYSAC and The Ring welterweight titles; For NBA welterweight title
115	Win	79–15–10 (11)	Billy Alger	TKO	9 (10)	Jun 17, 1929	Meyers Bowl, North Braddock, Pennsylvania, U.S.	
114	Win	78–15–10 (11)	Young Ketchell	UD	10	May 9, 1929	Elam A.C., Elam, Pennsylvania, U.S.	
113	Loss	77–15–10 (11)	Al Mello	PTS	10	Apr 12, 1929	Boston Garden, Boston, Massachusetts, U.S.	
112	Loss	77–14–10 (11)	Al Mello	PTS	10	Jan 25, 1929	Boston Garden, Boston, Massachusetts, U.S.	
111	Win	77–13–10 (11)	Johnny Roberts	PTS	10	Jan 14, 1929	Baesman Hall, Portsmouth, Ohio, U.S.	
110	Win	76–13–10 (11)	Walcott Langford	PTS	10	Oct 22, 1928	Arena, Philadelphia, Pennsylvania, U.S.	
109	Draw	75–13–10 (11)	Jimmy Finley	MD	10	Sep 28, 1928	Benjamin Field Arena, Tampa, Florida, U.S.	
108	Win	75–13–9 (11)	Johnny Roberts	PTS	10	Sep 17, 1928	Auditorium, Charlotte, North Carolina, U.S.	
107	Loss	74–13–9 (11)	Jack Thompson	TKO	2 (10)	Aug 30, 1928	Comiskey Park, Chicago, Illinois, U.S.	
106	Win	74–12–9 (11)	Hilario Martínez	TKO	8 (10)	Jul 7, 1928	Plaza de Toros Monumental, Barcelona, Cataluña, Spain	
105	NC	73–12–9 (11)	Georgie Levine	NC	9 (10)	May 17, 1928	Olympia Stadium, Detroit, U.S.	
104	Win	73–12–9 (10)	Billy Drako	TKO	3 (10)	Apr 26, 1928	Coliseum, Saint Louis, Missouri, U.S.	
103	Win	72–12–9 (10)	Jim Moran	KO	9 (12)	Apr 20, 1928	Benjamin Field Arena, Tampa, Florida, U.S.	
102	Win	71–12–9 (10)	Clyde Hull	TKO	8 (12)	Feb 13, 1928	Public Hall, Cleveland, Ohio, U.S.	
101	Win	70–12–9 (10)	Joe Simonich	PTS	10	Jan 23, 1928	Arena, Philadelphia, Pennsylvania, U.S.	
100	Win	69–12–9 (10)	Jean Mangeot	TKO	9 (10)	Jan 16, 1928	Newark, New Jersey, U.S.	
99	Win	68–12–9 (10)	Joe Reno	NWS	10	Jan 9, 1928	Arena, Trenton, New Jersey, U.S.	
98	Win	68–12–9 (9)	Meyer Grace	NWS	10	Dec 9, 1927	Tomlinson Hall, Indianapolis, Indiana, U.S.	
97	Loss	68–12–9 (8)	Johnny Indrisano	PTS	10	Sep 22, 1927	Braves Field, Boston, Massachusetts, U.S.	
96	NC	68–11–9 (8)	Pinky Mitchell	NC	6 (10)	Aug 11, 1927	Borchert Field, Milwaukee, Wisconsin, U.S.	The action resulted from this bout which was halted by the referee because of continued stalling
95	Win	68–11–9 (7)	Billy Drako	NWS	10	Jul 13, 1927	Redland Field, Cincinnati, Ohio, U.S.	NYSAC, NBA, and The Ring welterweight titles at stake; (via KO only)
94	Win	68–11–9 (6)	Pete Latzo	MD	15	Jun 3, 1927	Polo Grounds, New York City, New York, U.S.	Won NYSAC, NBA, and The Ring welterweight titles
93	Win	67–11–9 (6)	Billy Drako	PTS	10	May 11, 1927	Annapolis, Maryland, U.S.	
92	Win	66–11–9 (6)	Johnny Mendelsohn	TKO	4 (10)	May 2, 1927	Carlin's Park, Baltimore, Maryland, U.S.	
91	Win	65–11–9 (6)	Eddie Roberts	UD	10	Jan 14, 1927	Madison Square Garden, New York City, New York, U.S.	
90	Loss	64–11–9 (6)	Eddie Roberts	TKO	1 (10)	Dec 4, 1926	Recreation Park, San Francisco, California, U.S.	
89	Win	64–10–9 (6)	Jack Zivic	PTS	10	Oct 15, 1926	Madison Square Garden, New York City, New York, U.S.	
88	Win	63–10–9 (6)	Joe Bashara	NWS	6	Sep 15, 1926	Airport, Atlantic City, New Jersey, U.S.	
87	Win	63–10–9 (5)	Eddie Burnbrook	KO	3 (10)	Sep 9, 1926	Madison Square Garden, New York City, New York, U.S.	
86	Win	62–10–9 (5)	Mickey Walker	TKO	8 (10)	Jun 24, 1926	Madison Square Garden, New York City, New York, U.S.	
85	Win	61–10–9 (5)	Willie Harmon	PTS	10	May 28, 1926	Coney Island Stadium, New York City, New York, U.S.	
84	Win	60–10–9 (5)	Georgie Levine	PTS	10	May 7, 1926	Madison Square Garden, New York City, New York, U.S.	
83	Win	59–10–9 (5)	Tommy Freeman	TKO	5 (10)	Mar 1, 1926	Madison Square Garden, New York City, New York, U.S.	
82	Win	58–10–9 (5)	Jimmy Jones	PTS	10	Feb 12, 1926	Madison Square Garden, New York City, New York, U.S.	
81	Win	57–10–9 (5)	Joe Simonich	PTS	10	Jan 29, 1926	Madison Square Garden, New York City, New York, U.S.	
80	Win	56–10–9 (5)	Jack McVey	PTS	10	Jan 15, 1926	Madison Square Garden, New York City, New York, U.S.	
79	Win	55–10–9 (5)	Harry Dudley	NWS	15	Dec 7, 1925	Newark, New Jersey, U.S.	
78	Win	55–10–9 (4)	KO Leonard	KO	3 (10)	Dec 5, 1925	Adelphia A.C., Philadelphia, Pennsylvania, U.S.	
77	Win	54–10–9 (4)	Pep O'Brien	PTS	12	Oct 12, 1925	104th Regiment Armory, Baltimore, Maryland, U.S.	
76	Win	53–10–9 (4)	Pinky Mitchell	SD	10	Sep 24, 1925	Shibe Park, Philadelphia, Pennsylvania, U.S.	
75	Win	52–10–9 (4)	Luis Vicentini	UD	12	Aug 17, 1925	Queensboro Stadium, New York City, New York, U.S.	
74	Win	51–10–9 (4)	Nate Goldman	TKO	3 (10)	Aug 10, 1925	Shibe Park, Philadelphia, Pennsylvania, U.S.	
73	Draw	50–10–9 (4)	Lew Tendler	PTS	10	Jul 16, 1925	Shibe Park, Philadelphia, Pennsylvania, U.S.	
72	Draw	50–10–8 (4)	Alex Hart	PTS	12	Apr 27, 1925	104th Regiment Armory, Baltimore, Maryland, U.S.	
71	Win	50–10–7 (4)	Sid Barbarian	PTS	12	Mar 16, 1925	104th Regiment Armory, Baltimore, Maryland, U.S.	
70	Loss	49–10–7 (4)	Charlie O'Connell	PTS	10	Feb 25, 1925	Manhattan Casino, New York City, New York, U.S.	
69	Win	49–9–7 (4)	Sailor Friedman	UD	10	Feb 11, 1925	108th Field Artillery Armory, Philadelphia, Pennsylvania, U.S.	
68	Win	48–9–7 (4)	Cuddy DeMarco	PTS	10	Feb 2, 1925	104th Regiment Armory, Baltimore, Maryland, U.S.	
67	Win	47–9–7 (4)	Nate Goldman	KO	4 (10)	Jan 19, 1925	Arena, Philadelphia, Pennsylvania, U.S.	
66	Win	46–9–7 (4)	Johnny Mosely	UD	10	Dec 25, 1924	108th Field Artillery Armory, Philadelphia, Pennsylvania, U.S.	
65	Draw	45–9–7 (4)	Alex Hart	PTS	15	Dec 8, 1924	104th Regiment Armory, Baltimore, Maryland, U.S.	
64	Win	45–9–6 (4)	Sailor Friedman	NWS	12	Nov 11, 1924	Laurel Garden, Newark, New Jersey, U.S.	
63	Win	45–9–6 (3)	Joe Tiplitz	DQ	7 (10)	Nov 5, 1924	Folly Theater, Baltimore, Maryland, U.S.	
62	Win	44–9–6 (3)	Red Cap Wilson	KO	9 (10)	Oct 1, 1924	Folly Theater, Baltimore, Maryland, U.S.	
61	Win	43–9–6 (3)	Bud Christiano	PTS	10	Aug 26, 1924	Shetzline Ballpark, Philadelphia, Pennsylvania, U.S.	
60	Draw	42–9–6 (3)	Joe Tiplitz	PTS	10	Aug 4, 1924	Shetzline Ballpark, Philadelphia, Pennsylvania, U.S.	
59	Win	42–9–5 (3)	Pedro Campo	PTS	12	Jul 3, 1924	Sportland Heights Arena, Berwyn, Maryland, U.S.	
58	Win	41–9–5 (3)	Johnny Clinton	PTS	12	Jun 27, 1924	Arena, Rockaway Beach, Queens, New York City, New York, U.S.	
57	Win	40–9–5 (3)	Sailor Friedman	PTS	12	Jun 13, 1924	Carlin's Park, Baltimore, Maryland, U.S.	
56	Loss	39–9–5 (3)	Jack Rappaport	NWS	12	May 8, 1924	Laurel Garden, Newark, New Jersey, U.S.	
55	Win	39–9–5 (2)	Johnny Donnelly	KO	4 (12)	Apr 30, 1924	Gayety Theater, Baltimore, Maryland, U.S.	
54	Win	38–9–5 (2)	Andy Chaney	PTS	12	Apr 2, 1924	Gayety Theater, Baltimore, Maryland, U.S.	
53	Loss	37–9–5 (2)	Alex Hart	UD	12	Mar 12, 1924	Gayety Theater, Baltimore, Maryland, U.S.	
52	Win	37–8–5 (2)	Pedro Campo	PTS	10	Feb 25, 1924	Arena, Philadelphia, Pennsylvania, U.S.	
51	Win	36–8–5 (2)	Billy Angelo	TKO	8 (12)	Jan 16, 1924	Gayety Theater, Baltimore, Maryland, U.S.	
50	Win	35–8–5 (2)	Ted Marchant	UD	10	Jan 8, 1924	Arena, Philadelphia, Pennsylvania, U.S.	
49	Win	34–8–5 (2)	Ted Marchant	PTS	12	Dec 19, 1923	Gayety Theater, Baltimore, Maryland, U.S.	
48	Win	33–8–5 (2)	Joe Welling	PTS	12	Nov 21, 1923	Gayety Theater, Baltimore, Maryland, U.S.	
47	Win	32–8–5 (2)	Ever Hammer	PTS	12	Nov 1, 1923	Gayety Theater, Baltimore, Maryland, U.S.	
46	Win	31–8–5 (2)	Jack Darcy	KO	2 (12)	Oct 3, 1923	Gayety Theater, Baltimore, Maryland, U.S.	
45	Win	30–8–5 (2)	Jack Zivic	PTS	12	Sep 12, 1923	Gayety Theater, Baltimore, Maryland, U.S.	
44	Win	29–8–5 (2)	Mel Coogan	PTS	12	Aug 30, 1923	Sportland Heights Arena, Berwyn, Maryland, U.S.	
43	Win	28–8–5 (2)	Roddy MacDonald	PTS	12	Jul 19, 1923	Sportland Heights Arena, Berwyn, Maryland, U.S.	
42	Win	27–8–5 (2)	Andy Bowen	PTS	10	Jul 4, 1923	Barracks, Washington, D.C., U.S.	
41	Win	26–8–5 (2)	Nate Isaacman	NWS	10	May 29, 1923	Peerless A.C., Harrisburg, Pennsylvania, U.S.	
40	Draw	26–8–5 (1)	Johnny Reno	PTS	10	May 10, 1923	Sportland Heights Arena, Berwyn, Maryland, U.S.	
39	Win	26–8–4 (1)	Pedro Campo	PTS	12	Apr 11, 1923	Gayety Theater, Baltimore, Maryland, U.S.	
38	Loss	25–8–4 (1)	Len Mahoney	PTS	15	Feb 5, 1923	4th Regiment Armory, Baltimore, Maryland, U.S.	
37	Win	25–7–4 (1)	Bobby Robideau	PTS	6	Jan 3, 1923	Gayety Theater, Baltimore, Maryland, U.S.	
36	Win	24–7–4 (1)	Harry Rice	PTS	6	Dec 6, 1922	Gayety Theater, Baltimore, Maryland, U.S.	
35	Win	23–7–4 (1)	Matty Brooks	PTS	6	Nov 22, 1922	Gayety Theater, Baltimore, Maryland, U.S.	
34	Win	22–7–4 (1)	Andy Tucker	PTS	10	Oct 24, 1922	Strand Theater, Richmond, Maryland, U.S.	
33	Loss	21–7–4 (1)	Kid Williams	DQ	10 (12)	Sep 4, 1922	4th Regiment Armory, Baltimore, Maryland, U.S.	
32	Win	21–6–4 (1)	Harry Rice	PTS	8	Jul 24, 1922	Maryland Ball Park, Baltimore, Maryland, U.S.	
31	Win	20–6–4 (1)	Nate Isaacman	PTS	6	Jun 1, 1922	Folly Theater, Baltimore, Maryland, U.S.	
30	Loss	19–6–4 (1)	Andy Chaney	TKO	8 (12)	Apr 18, 1922	Playhouse, Baltimore, Maryland, U.S.	
29	Win	19–5–4 (1)	Freddie Jacks	UD	12	Mar 14, 1922	Richmond Market Armory, Baltimore, Maryland, U.S.	
28	Win	18–5–4 (1)	Tommy Cleary	PTS	12	Feb 13, 1922	4th Medical Regiment Amory, Baltimore, Maryland, U.S.	
27	Loss	17–5–4 (1)	Freddie Jacks	PTS	12	Jan 12, 1922	4th Medical Regiment Amory, Baltimore, Maryland, U.S.	
26	Win	17–4–4 (1)	Len Mahoney	PTS	12	Dec 5, 1921	4th Medical Regiment Amory, Baltimore, Maryland, U.S.	
25	Win	16–4–4 (1)	Ralph Brady	PTS	12	Nov 21, 1921	4th Medical Regiment Amory, Baltimore, Maryland, U.S.	
24	Win	15–4–4 (1)	Harry Rice	PTS	8	Oct 26, 1921	Gayety Theater, Baltimore, Maryland, U.S.	
23	Win	14–4–4 (1)	Jack Hyman	KO	5 (8)	Oct 12, 1921	Gayety Theater, Baltimore, Maryland, U.S.	
22	Win	13–4–4 (1)	Speedy Lawrence	KO	4 (10)	Aug 1, 1921	Hopewell, Virginia, U.S.	
21	Win	12–4–4 (1)	Danny Duarte	KO	9 (10)	Jun 2, 1921	Columbus Hall, Yonkers, New York, U.S.	
20	Loss	11–4–4 (1)	Len Mahoney	PTS	12	Feb 5, 1921	4th Medical Regiment Amory, Baltimore, Maryland, U.S.	
19	Draw	11–3–4 (1)	Eddie Wagner	PTS	8	Jan 14, 1921	4th Medical Regiment Amory, Baltimore, Maryland, U.S.	
18	Win	11–3–3 (1)	Lew Heywood	PTS	6	Dec 29, 1920	Folly Theater, Baltimore, Maryland, U.S.	
17	Win	10–3–3 (1)	Chick Kansas	PTS	6	Dec 22, 1920	Folly Theater, Baltimore, Maryland, U.S.	
16	Draw	9–3–3 (1)	Andy Smith	NWS	10	Oct 27, 1920	Auditorium, Reading, Pennsylvania, U.S.	
15	Win	9–3–3	Battling Leonard	PTS	8	Oct 1, 1920	5th Regiment Armory, Baltimore, Maryland, U.S.	
14	Win	8–3–3	Mike Ertle	PTS	8	Aug 13, 1920	Oriole Park, Baltimore, Maryland, U.S.	
13	Win	7–3–3	Goldie Ahearn	PTS	8	Jun 28, 1920	Oriole Park, Baltimore, Maryland, U.S.	
12	Draw	6–3–3	Battling Morgan	PTS	8	Apr 30, 1920	Colonial Theater, Baltimore, Maryland, U.S.	
11	Draw	6–3–2	Goldie Ahearn	PTS	6	Apr 16, 1920	Albaugh Theater, Baltimore, Maryland, U.S.	
10	Loss	6–3–1	Battling Morgan	PTS	6	Apr 5, 1920	Colonial Theater, Baltimore, Maryland, U.S.	
9	Win	6–2–1	Young Kilbane	TKO	3 (6)	Feb 13, 1920	Albaugh Theater, Baltimore, Maryland, U.S.	
8	Win	5–2–1	Kid Richmond	PTS	6	Feb 7, 1920	Albaugh Theater, Baltimore, Maryland, U.S.	
7	Win	4–2–1	Georgie Lewis	TKO	3 (4)	Jan 23, 1920	Albaugh Theater, Baltimore, Maryland, U.S.	
6	Win	3–2–1	Young Kilbane	KO	2 (4)	Dec 26, 1919	Albaugh Theater, Baltimore, Maryland, U.S.	
5	Draw	2–2–1	Charles Barber	PTS	4	Nov 14, 1919	Albaugh Theater, Baltimore, Maryland, U.S.	
4	Win	2–2	Joe Casner	KO	2 (6)	Jul 4, 1919	National A.C., Philadelphia, Pennsylvania, U.S.	
3	Win	1–2	Red Tendler	KO	2 (4)	Jun 2, 1919	Gayety Theater, Baltimore, Maryland, U.S.	
2	Loss	0–2	Red Tendler	PTS	4	May 9, 1919	Albaugh Theater, Baltimore, Maryland, U.S.	
1	Loss	0–1	Little Jeff Smith	PTS	4	Mar 14, 1919	Albaugh Theater, Baltimore, Maryland, U.S.	

=== Unofficial record ===
129 fights	92 wins	23 losses
By knockout	25	6
By decision	66	15
By disqualification	1	2
Draws	12	
No contests	2	

Record with the inclusion of newspaper decisions to the win/loss/draw column.

No.	Result	Record	Opponent	Type	Round	Date	Location	Notes
129	Loss	92–23–12 (2)	Ignacio Ara	KO	1 (10)	Feb 28, 1931	Arena Cristal, Havana, Cuba	
128	Win	92–22–12 (2)	Meyer Lichtenstein	PTS	10	Feb 16, 1931	104th Regiment Armory, Baltimore, Maryland, U.S.	
127	Loss	91–22–12 (2)	Pete Susky	KO	3 (10)	Oct 3, 1930	Watres Armory, Scranton, Pennsylvania, U.S.	
126	Loss	91–21–12 (2)	Ben Jeby	PTS	8	Sep 11, 1930	Yankee Stadium, New York City, New York, U.S.	
125	Draw	91–20–12 (2)	Buck McTiernan	PTS	10	Aug 11, 1930	Meyers Bowl, North Braddock, Pennsylvania, U.S.	
124	Win	91–20–11 (2)	Harry Mason	PTS	10	May 28, 1930	Madison Square Garden, New York City, New York, U.S.	
123	Win	90–20–11 (2)	Charlie Rosen	PTS	6	May 3, 1930	Ridgewood Grove, New York City, New York, U.S.	
122	Loss	89–20–11 (2)	Thomas Lawless	UD	10	Apr 14, 1930	Convention Hall, Rochester, New York, U.S.	
121	Loss	89–19–11 (2)	Ted Goodrich	TKO	2 (10)	Mar 18, 1930	Auditorium, Atlanta, Georgia, U.S.	
120	Win	89–18–11 (2)	Joe Trippe	PTS	10	Mar 3, 1930	Convention Hall, Rochester, New York, U.S.	
119	Loss	88–18–11 (2)	Paulie Walker	PTS	10	Feb 3, 1930	Arena, Philadelphia, Pennsylvania, U.S.	
118	Win	88–17–11 (2)	Billy Angelo	PTS	10	Nov 4, 1929	Arena, Philadelphia, Pennsylvania, U.S.	
117	Win	87–17–11 (2)	Bert Colima	PTS	10	Oct 13, 1929	El Toreo de Cuatro Caminos, Mexico City, Distrito Federal, Mexico	Won Mexico welterweight title
116	Loss	86–17–11 (2)	Jackie Fields	DQ	2 (15)	Jul 25, 1929	State Fairgrounds Arena, Detroit, Michigan, U.S.	Lost NYSAC and The Ring welterweight titles; For NBA welterweight title
115	Win	86–16–11 (2)	Billy Alger	TKO	9 (10)	Jun 17, 1929	Meyers Bowl, North Braddock, Pennsylvania, U.S.	
114	Win	85–16–11 (2)	Young Ketchell	UD	10	May 9, 1929	Elam A.C., Elam, Pennsylvania, U.S.	
113	Loss	84–16–11 (2)	Al Mello	PTS	10	Apr 12, 1929	Boston Garden, Boston, Massachusetts, U.S.	
112	Loss	84–15–11 (2)	Al Mello	PTS	10	Jan 25, 1929	Boston Garden, Boston, Massachusetts, U.S.	
111	Win	84–14–11 (2)	Johnny Roberts	PTS	10	Jan 14, 1929	Baesman Hall, Portsmouth, Ohio, U.S.	
110	Win	83–14–11 (2)	Walcott Langford	PTS	10	Oct 22, 1928	Arena, Philadelphia, Pennsylvania, U.S.	
109	Draw	82–14–11 (2)	Jimmy Finley	MD	10	Sep 28, 1928	Benjamin Field Arena, Tampa, Florida, U.S.	
108	Win	82–14–10 (2)	Johnny Roberts	PTS	10	Sep 17, 1928	Auditorium, Charlotte, North Carolina, U.S.	
107	Loss	81–14–10 (2)	Jack Thompson	TKO	2 (10)	Aug 30, 1928	Comiskey Park, Chicago, Illinois, U.S.	
106	Win	81–13–10 (2)	Hilario Martínez	TKO	8 (10)	Jul 7, 1928	Plaza de Toros Monumental, Barcelona, Cataluña, Spain	
105	NC	80–13–10 (2)	Georgie Levine	NC	9 (10)	May 17, 1928	Olympia Stadium, Detroit, U.S.	
104	Win	80–13–10 (1)	Billy Drako	TKO	3 (10)	Apr 26, 1928	Coliseum, Saint Louis, Missouri, U.S.	
103	Win	79–13–10 (1)	Jim Moran	KO	9 (12)	Apr 20, 1928	Benjamin Field Arena, Tampa, Florida, U.S.	
102	Win	78–13–10 (1)	Clyde Hull	TKO	8 (12)	Feb 13, 1928	Public Hall, Cleveland, Ohio, U.S.	
101	Win	77–13–10 (1)	Joe Simonich	PTS	10	Jan 23, 1928	Arena, Philadelphia, Pennsylvania, U.S.	
100	Win	76–13–10 (1)	Jean Mangeot	TKO	9 (10)	Jan 16, 1928	Newark, New Jersey, U.S.	
99	Win	75–13–10 (1)	Joe Reno	NWS	10	Jan 9, 1928	Arena, Trenton, New Jersey, U.S.	
98	Win	74–13–10 (1)	Meyer Grace	NWS	10	Dec 9, 1927	Tomlinson Hall, Indianapolis, Indiana, U.S.	
97	Loss	73–13–10 (1)	Johnny Indrisano	PTS	10	Sep 22, 1927	Braves Field, Boston, Massachusetts, U.S.	
96	NC	73–12–10 (1)	Pinky Mitchell	NC	6 (10)	Aug 11, 1927	Borchert Field, Milwaukee, Wisconsin, U.S.	The action resulted from this bout which was halted by the referee because of continued stalling
95	Win	73–12–10	Billy Drako	NWS	10	Jul 13, 1927	Redland Field, Cincinnati, Ohio, U.S.	NYSAC, NBA, and The Ring welterweight titles at stake; (via KO only)
94	Win	72–12–10	Pete Latzo	MD	15	Jun 3, 1927	Polo Grounds, New York City, New York, U.S.	Won NYSAC, NBA, and The Ring welterweight titles
93	Win	71–12–10	Billy Drako	PTS	10	May 11, 1927	Annapolis, Maryland, U.S.	
92	Win	70–12–10	Johnny Mendelsohn	TKO	4 (10)	May 2, 1927	Carlin's Park, Baltimore, Maryland, U.S.	
91	Win	69–12–10	Eddie Roberts	UD	10	Jan 14, 1927	Madison Square Garden, New York City, New York, U.S.	
90	Loss	68–12–10	Eddie Roberts	TKO	1 (10)	Dec 4, 1926	Recreation Park, San Francisco, California, U.S.	
89	Win	68–11–10	Jack Zivic	PTS	10	Oct 15, 1926	Madison Square Garden, New York City, New York, U.S.	
88	Win	67–11–10	Joe Bashara	NWS	6	Sep 15, 1926	Airport, Atlantic City, New Jersey, U.S.	
87	Win	66–11–10	Eddie Burnbrook	KO	3 (10)	Sep 9, 1926	Madison Square Garden, New York City, New York, U.S.	
86	Win	65–11–10	Mickey Walker	TKO	8 (10)	Jun 24, 1926	Madison Square Garden, New York City, New York, U.S.	
85	Win	64–11–10	Willie Harmon	PTS	10	May 28, 1926	Coney Island Stadium, New York City, New York, U.S.	
84	Win	63–11–10	Georgie Levine	PTS	10	May 7, 1926	Madison Square Garden, New York City, New York, U.S.	
83	Win	62–11–10	Tommy Freeman	TKO	5 (10)	Mar 1, 1926	Madison Square Garden, New York City, New York, U.S.	
82	Win	61–11–10	Jimmy Jones	PTS	10	Feb 12, 1926	Madison Square Garden, New York City, New York, U.S.	
81	Win	60–11–10	Joe Simonich	PTS	10	Jan 29, 1926	Madison Square Garden, New York City, New York, U.S.	
80	Win	59–11–10	Jack McVey	PTS	10	Jan 15, 1926	Madison Square Garden, New York City, New York, U.S.	
79	Win	58–11–10	Harry Dudley	NWS	15	Dec 7, 1925	Newark, New Jersey, U.S.	
78	Win	57–11–10	KO Leonard	KO	3 (10)	Dec 5, 1925	Adelphia A.C., Philadelphia, Pennsylvania, U.S.	
77	Win	56–11–10	Pep O'Brien	PTS	12	Oct 12, 1925	104th Regiment Armory, Baltimore, Maryland, U.S.	
76	Win	55–11–10	Pinky Mitchell	SD	10	Sep 24, 1925	Shibe Park, Philadelphia, Pennsylvania, U.S.	
75	Win	54–11–10	Luis Vicentini	UD	12	Aug 17, 1925	Queensboro Stadium, New York City, New York, U.S.	
74	Win	53–11–10	Nate Goldman	TKO	3 (10)	Aug 10, 1925	Shibe Park, Philadelphia, Pennsylvania, U.S.	
73	Draw	52–11–10	Lew Tendler	PTS	10	Jul 16, 1925	Shibe Park, Philadelphia, Pennsylvania, U.S.	
72	Draw	52–11–9	Alex Hart	PTS	12	Apr 27, 1925	104th Regiment Armory, Baltimore, Maryland, U.S.	
71	Win	52–11–8	Sid Barbarian	PTS	12	Mar 16, 1925	104th Regiment Armory, Baltimore, Maryland, U.S.	
70	Loss	51–11–8	Charlie O'Connell	PTS	10	Feb 25, 1925	Manhattan Casino, New York City, New York, U.S.	
69	Win	51–10–8	Sailor Friedman	UD	10	Feb 11, 1925	108th Field Artillery Armory, Philadelphia, Pennsylvania, U.S.	
68	Win	50–10–8	Cuddy DeMarco	PTS	10	Feb 2, 1925	104th Regiment Armory, Baltimore, Maryland, U.S.	
67	Win	49–10–8	Nate Goldman	KO	4 (10)	Jan 19, 1925	Arena, Philadelphia, Pennsylvania, U.S.	
66	Win	48–10–8	Johnny Mosely	UD	10	Dec 25, 1924	108th Field Artillery Armory, Philadelphia, Pennsylvania, U.S.	
65	Draw	47–10–8	Alex Hart	PTS	15	Dec 8, 1924	104th Regiment Armory, Baltimore, Maryland, U.S.	
64	Win	47–10–7	Sailor Friedman	NWS	12	Nov 11, 1924	Laurel Garden, Newark, New Jersey, U.S.	
63	Win	46–10–7	Joe Tiplitz	DQ	7 (10)	Nov 5, 1924	Folly Theater, Baltimore, Maryland, U.S.	
62	Win	45–10–7	Red Cap Wilson	KO	9 (10)	Oct 1, 1924	Folly Theater, Baltimore, Maryland, U.S.	
61	Win	44–10–7	Bud Christiano	PTS	10	Aug 26, 1924	Shetzline Ballpark, Philadelphia, Pennsylvania, U.S.	
60	Draw	43–10–7	Joe Tiplitz	PTS	10	Aug 4, 1924	Shetzline Ballpark, Philadelphia, Pennsylvania, U.S.	
59	Win	43–10–6	Pedro Campo	PTS	12	Jul 3, 1924	Sportland Heights Arena, Berwyn, Maryland, U.S.	
58	Win	42–10–6	Johnny Clinton	PTS	12	Jun 27, 1924	Arena, Rockaway Beach, Queens, New York City, New York, U.S.	
57	Win	41–10–6	Sailor Friedman	PTS	12	Jun 13, 1924	Carlin's Park, Baltimore, Maryland, U.S.	
56	Loss	40–10–6	Jack Rappaport	NWS	12	May 8, 1924	Laurel Garden, Newark, New Jersey, U.S.	
55	Win	40–9–6	Johnny Donnelly	KO	4 (12)	Apr 30, 1924	Gayety Theater, Baltimore, Maryland, U.S.	
54	Win	39–9–6	Andy Chaney	PTS	12	Apr 2, 1924	Gayety Theater, Baltimore, Maryland, U.S.	
53	Loss	38–9–6	Alex Hart	UD	12	Mar 12, 1924	Gayety Theater, Baltimore, Maryland, U.S.	
52	Win	38–8–6	Pedro Campo	PTS	10	Feb 25, 1924	Arena, Philadelphia, Pennsylvania, U.S.	
51	Win	37–8–6	Billy Angelo	TKO	8 (12)	Jan 16, 1924	Gayety Theater, Baltimore, Maryland, U.S.	
50	Win	36–8–6	Ted Marchant	UD	10	Jan 8, 1924	Arena, Philadelphia, Pennsylvania, U.S.	
49	Win	35–8–6	Ted Marchant	PTS	12	Dec 19, 1923	Gayety Theater, Baltimore, Maryland, U.S.	
48	Win	34–8–6	Joe Welling	PTS	12	Nov 21, 1923	Gayety Theater, Baltimore, Maryland, U.S.	
47	Win	33–8–6	Ever Hammer	PTS	12	Nov 1, 1923	Gayety Theater, Baltimore, Maryland, U.S.	
46	Win	32–8–6	Jack Darcy	KO	2 (12)	Oct 3, 1923	Gayety Theater, Baltimore, Maryland, U.S.	
45	Win	31–8–6	Jack Zivic	PTS	12	Sep 12, 1923	Gayety Theater, Baltimore, Maryland, U.S.	
44	Win	30–8–6	Mel Coogan	PTS	12	Aug 30, 1923	Sportland Heights Arena, Berwyn, Maryland, U.S.	
43	Win	29–8–6	Roddy MacDonald	PTS	12	Jul 19, 1923	Sportland Heights Arena, Berwyn, Maryland, U.S.	
42	Win	28–8–6	Andy Bowen	PTS	10	Jul 4, 1923	Barracks, Washington, D.C., U.S.	
41	Win	27–8–6	Nate Isaacman	NWS	10	May 29, 1923	Peerless A.C., Harrisburg, Pennsylvania, U.S.	
40	Draw	26–8–6	Johnny Reno	PTS	10	May 10, 1923	Sportland Heights Arena, Berwyn, Maryland, U.S.	
39	Win	26–8–5	Pedro Campo	PTS	12	Apr 11, 1923	Gayety Theater, Baltimore, Maryland, U.S.	
38	Loss	25–8–5	Len Mahoney	PTS	15	Feb 5, 1923	4th Regiment Armory, Baltimore, Maryland, U.S.	
37	Win	25–7–5	Bobby Robideau	PTS	6	Jan 3, 1923	Gayety Theater, Baltimore, Maryland, U.S.	
36	Win	24–7–5	Harry Rice	PTS	6	Dec 6, 1922	Gayety Theater, Baltimore, Maryland, U.S.	
35	Win	23–7–5	Matty Brooks	PTS	6	Nov 22, 1922	Gayety Theater, Baltimore, Maryland, U.S.	
34	Win	22–7–5	Andy Tucker	PTS	10	Oct 24, 1922	Strand Theater, Richmond, Maryland, U.S.	
33	Loss	21–7–5	Kid Williams	DQ	10 (12)	Sep 4, 1922	4th Regiment Armory, Baltimore, Maryland, U.S.	
32	Win	21–6–5	Harry Rice	PTS	8	Jul 24, 1922	Maryland Ball Park, Baltimore, Maryland, U.S.	
31	Win	20–6–5	Nate Isaacman	PTS	6	Jun 1, 1922	Folly Theater, Baltimore, Maryland, U.S.	
30	Loss	19–6–5	Andy Chaney	TKO	8 (12)	Apr 18, 1922	Playhouse, Baltimore, Maryland, U.S.	
29	Win	19–5–5	Freddie Jacks	UD	12	Mar 14, 1922	Richmond Market Armory, Baltimore, Maryland, U.S.	
28	Win	18–5–5	Tommy Cleary	PTS	12	Feb 13, 1922	4th Medical Regiment Amory, Baltimore, Maryland, U.S.	
27	Loss	17–5–5	Freddie Jacks	PTS	12	Jan 12, 1922	4th Medical Regiment Amory, Baltimore, Maryland, U.S.	
26	Win	17–4–5	Len Mahoney	PTS	12	Dec 5, 1921	4th Medical Regiment Amory, Baltimore, Maryland, U.S.	
25	Win	16–4–5	Ralph Brady	PTS	12	Nov 21, 1921	4th Medical Regiment Amory, Baltimore, Maryland, U.S.	
24	Win	15–4–5	Harry Rice	PTS	8	Oct 26, 1921	Gayety Theater, Baltimore, Maryland, U.S.	
23	Win	14–4–5	Jack Hyman	KO	5 (8)	Oct 12, 1921	Gayety Theater, Baltimore, Maryland, U.S.	
22	Win	13–4–5	Speedy Lawrence	KO	4 (10)	Aug 1, 1921	Hopewell, Virginia, U.S.	
21	Win	12–4–5	Danny Duarte	KO	9 (10)	Jun 2, 1921	Columbus Hall, Yonkers, New York, U.S.	
20	Loss	11–4–5	Len Mahoney	PTS	12	Feb 5, 1921	4th Medical Regiment Amory, Baltimore, Maryland, U.S.	
19	Draw	11–3–5	Eddie Wagner	PTS	8	Jan 14, 1921	4th Medical Regiment Amory, Baltimore, Maryland, U.S.	
18	Win	11–3–4	Lew Heywood	PTS	6	Dec 29, 1920	Folly Theater, Baltimore, Maryland, U.S.	
17	Win	10–3–4	Chick Kansas	PTS	6	Dec 22, 1920	Folly Theater, Baltimore, Maryland, U.S.	
16	Draw	9–3–4	Andy Smith	NWS	10	Oct 27, 1920	Auditorium, Reading, Pennsylvania, U.S.	
15	Win	9–3–3	Battling Leonard	PTS	8	Oct 1, 1920	5th Regiment Armory, Baltimore, Maryland, U.S.	
14	Win	8–3–3	Mike Ertle	PTS	8	Aug 13, 1920	Oriole Park, Baltimore, Maryland, U.S.	
13	Win	7–3–3	Goldie Ahearn	PTS	8	Jun 28, 1920	Oriole Park, Baltimore, Maryland, U.S.	
12	Draw	6–3–3	Battling Morgan	PTS	8	Apr 30, 1920	Colonial Theater, Baltimore, Maryland, U.S.	
11	Draw	6–3–2	Goldie Ahearn	PTS	6	Apr 16, 1920	Albaugh Theater, Baltimore, Maryland, U.S.	
10	Loss	6–3–1	Battling Morgan	PTS	6	Apr 5, 1920	Colonial Theater, Baltimore, Maryland, U.S.	
9	Win	6–2–1	Young Kilbane	TKO	3 (6)	Feb 13, 1920	Albaugh Theater, Baltimore, Maryland, U.S.	
8	Win	5–2–1	Kid Richmond	PTS	6	Feb 7, 1920	Albaugh Theater, Baltimore, Maryland, U.S.	
7	Win	4–2–1	Georgie Lewis	TKO	3 (4)	Jan 23, 1920	Albaugh Theater, Baltimore, Maryland, U.S.	
6	Win	3–2–1	Young Kilbane	KO	2 (4)	Dec 26, 1919	Albaugh Theater, Baltimore, Maryland, U.S.	
5	Draw	2–2–1	Charles Barber	PTS	4	Nov 14, 1919	Albaugh Theater, Baltimore, Maryland, U.S.	
4	Win	2–2	Joe Casner	KO	2 (6)	Jul 4, 1919	National A.C., Philadelphia, Pennsylvania, U.S.	
3	Win	1–2	Red Tendler	KO	2 (4)	Jun 2, 1919	Gayety Theater, Baltimore, Maryland, U.S.	
2	Loss	0–2	Red Tendler	PTS	4	May 9, 1919	Albaugh Theater, Baltimore, Maryland, U.S.	
1	Loss	0–1	Little Jeff Smith	PTS	4	Mar 14, 1919	Albaugh Theater, Baltimore, Maryland, U.S.	

== Titles in boxing ==
=== Major world titles ===
- NYSAC welterweight champion (147 lbs)
- NBA (WBA) welterweight champion (147 lbs)

=== The Ring magazine titles ===
- The Ring welterweight champion (147 lbs)

=== Regional/International titles ===
- Mexico welterweight champion (147 lbs)

=== Undisputed titles ===
- Undisputed welterweight champion

== See also ==
- List of welterweight boxing champions

Achievements
Preceded by Pete Latzo	World Welterweight Champion; June 3, 1927 – 25 July 1929	Succeeded by Jackie Fields
