= Tyll =

Tyll may refer to:

== People ==
- Axel Tyll (born 1953), German former footballer
- Edward Tyll (born 1956), American comedian and radio personality
- Tyll Necker, German entrepreneur and president of the Bundesverband der Deutschen Industrie
- Tyll, penname of Edgar Jung (1894–1934), German lawyer, politician and assassin

== Other uses ==
- Tyll (novel), a 2017 novel by Daniel Kehlmann
- Tyll, a 1928 opera by the German composer Mark Lothar
- Tyll, a 1918 book by the German writer Hans Reimann

== See also ==
- Thil (disambiguation)
- Til (disambiguation)
- Till (disambiguation)
