= Tilo =

Tilo, TiLo, or TILO, may refer to:

== Botany ==
- Dianthera pectoralis, or tilo, an herb of Central and South America
- Ocotea foetens, or tilo, a tree of Madeira and the Canary Islands

== Initialisms and acronyms ==
- Technology for Improved Learning Outcomes, a defunct educational program in Egypt
- Treni Regionali Ticino Lombardia, a regional railway operator in southern Switzerland and northern Italy

== People ==
- Tilo Baumgärtel (born 1972), German painter
- Tilo von Berlepsch (1913–1991), German actor
- Tilo Bonow (born 1980), German tech investor and entrepreneur
- Tilo Frey (1923–2008), Swiss politician
- Tilo González (born 1952), Chilean drummer, member of the band Congreso
- Tilo Gundlack (born 1968), German politician
- Tilo Gutzeit (born 1938), German figure skater
- Tilo Jung (born 1985), German journalist
- Tilo Kummer (born 1968), German politician
- Tilo Medek (1940–2006), German composer, musicologist, and music publisher
- Tilo Prückner (1940–2020), German actor
- Tilo Schmitz (born 1959), German voice actor
- Tilo Wolff (born 1972), German musician
- TiLo, American rapper, former member of Methods of Mayhem

== Other uses ==
- Tilo, Chad, a village
- Cyclone Tilo, a European windstorm, cause of the North Sea flood of 2007

== See also ==
- Thilo, a given name and surname
- Til (disambiguation)
- Tilia, a genus of Northern Hemisphere trees and bushes
