= Thil =

Thil may refer to:

== Places ==
Antarctica

- Thil Island

France

- Thil, Ain
- Thil, Aube
- Thil, Haute-Garonne
- Thil, Marne
- Thil, Meurthe-et-Moselle
- Thil-Manneville, Seine-Maritime
- Thil-sur-Arroux, Saône-et-Loire
- Château de Thil, a ruined castle near Dijon in Burgundy

== People ==
- Grégory Thil (born 1980), French footballer
- Marcel Thil (1904–1968), French boxer

== See also ==
- Til (disambiguation)
- Vic-sous-Thil, a commune near Château de Thil
