= Sauter (disambiguation) =

Sauter is a surname of German origin:

- Sauter

This surname is also part of the name of some institutions and terms:

- August Sauter KG - a German manufacturer of weighing equipment acquired by Mettler Instruments AG in 1971
- Sauter AG - Swiss based international group active in building automation business
- Sauter's brown frog - species of frog in the genus Rana endemic to Taiwan
- Sauter-Finegan Orchestra - American swing jazz band
- Sauter mean diameter - average of particle size
- Sauter Piano Manufaktur - a German manufacturer of pianos

== See also ==
- Sautter
