= Sauter =

Sauter is a surname of German origin. The name refers to:

- Al Sauter (1868–1928), Major League Baseball infielder
- Anton Eleutherius Sauter (1800–1881), Austrian botanist
- Christian Sauter (born 1988), German professional footballer
- Christian Sauter (born 1980), German politician
- Christoph Sauter (born 1991) German footballer
- Cory Sauter (born 1974), American professional football player
- Doug Sauter (born 1954), retired Canadian ice hockey coach
- Ernest Sauter (1928–2013), German composer
- Eddie Sauter (1914–1981), American music composer and jazz arranger
- Fritz Sauter (1906–1983), Austrian-German physicist
- Georg Sauter (1866–1937), German-English painter, lithographer and draftsman
- Hans Sauter (1871–1943), German entomologist and ichthyologist
- Hans Sauter (1925–2014), Austrian gymnast
- Hardy Sauter (born 1971), Canadian former ice hockey defenseman and coach
- Jay Sauter (born 1962), American race car driver
- Jim Sauter (contemporary), American saxophonist
- Jim Sauter (1943–2014), American race car driver
- Joachim Sauter (1959–2021), German media artist and designer
- Johnny Sauter (born 1978), American race car driver
- Nelly Sauter (1959 - 2021), Swiss footballer
- Otto Sauter (born 1961), German trumpet soloist
- Otto Sauter-Sarto (1884–1958), German actor
- Peeter Sauter (born 1962), Estonian actor and author
- Thilo Sauter, Austrian engineer
- Tim Sauter (born 1964), American race car driver
- Travis Sauter (born 1982), American stock car racing driver
- Vicki Sauter (born 1955), American management scientist
- Wilhelm Sauter (1896–1848), German painter

== See also ==
- Sauter (disambiguation)
