= Till (disambiguation) =

Till is unsorted glacial sediment.

Till may also refer to:

== Agriculture ==
- Tillage, a broad type of soil preparation
- Till (seed), sesame seeds

== Artificial objects ==
- Till (furniture), a small compartment or shelf inside a blanket chest
- Till, or cash register, a machine for calculating and recording transactions
  - the checkout or point of sale area of a shop (in colloquial metonymy)

== Arts and entertainment ==
- Till (film), 2022 American film about Mamie Till-Mobley
- "Till" (song), recorded by Roger Williams, The Angels, and The Vogues, among others
- Till (Roger Williams album), 1958
- Till (The Vogues album), 1969
- Till (Jerry Vale album), 1969
- "Till... (Ballad Unit)", a 2019 song by Pentagon from Genie:us

== People ==
- Till (surname), list of people with the surname
- Till Eulenspiegel, a mythical Middle Low German folk figure
- Till Lindemann (born 1963), of German metal band Rammstein

== Rivers in England ==
- River Till, Lincolnshire
- River Till, Northumberland
- River Till, Wiltshire

== See also ==
- Tell (disambiguation)
- Til (disambiguation)
- Tull (disambiguation)
- Until (disambiguation)
