= Thilo =

Thilo is a masculine name of Germanic origin and a surname. Notable people called Thilo include:

== Given name ==
- Thilo Berg (born 1959), German drummer who led a big band in the 1980s
- Thilo Bode (born 1947), the founder and International Director of Foodwatch, formerly CEO of Greenpeace
- Thilo Heinzmann (born 1969), German painter
- Thilo Hermann (born 1964), German heavy metal guitarist and songwriter
- Thilo Irmisch (1816–1879), 19th-century German botanist
- Thilo Kehrer (born 1996), German professional footballer
- Thilo Leugers (born 1991), German former professional footballer
- Thilo Maatsch (born 1900), German artist and an exponent of abstract art, constructivism, and concrete art
- Thilo Marauhn (born 1963), German expert on international law
- Thilo Martinho (born 1960), German musician, singer, guitarist, and songwriter
- Thilo Sarrazin (born 1945), German politician and former member of the SPD
- Thilo Sauter, director of the Research Unit for Integrated Sensor Systems, Austria
- Thilo C. Schadeberg (born 1942), emeritus Professor of Bantu Linguistics at Leiden University
- Thilo Schmitt (born 1982), German slalom canoeist who competed at the international level from 1999 to 2003
- Thilo Semmelbauer, became COO of Shutterstock in 2010
- Thilo Stralkowski (born 1987), German field hockey coach and former player
- Thilo Thielke (1968–2020), German journalist and writer
- Thilo Versick (born 1985), German former professional footballer
- Thilo von Westernhagen (1950–2014), German composer and pianist
- Thilo Wilke (born 1991), German professional footballer

== Surname ==
- Anne-Sophie Thilo (born 1987), Swiss former sailor, specialized in the two-person dinghy class
- Heinz Thilo (1911–1945), German SS officer and a physician in the Nazi concentration camp Auschwitz
- Jesper Thilo (1941–2026), Danish jazz musician, mainly known as a tenor saxophonist, alto saxophonist and clarinettist
- Johann Karl Thilo (1794–1853), German theologian and biblical scholar

== See also ==
- Hans-Thilo Schmidt (1888–1943), German spy who sold secrets about the Enigma machine to the French and others during World War II
- Tilo (disambiguation)
