= Frankie Hughes (boxer) =

American boxer (c. 1905–1961)

Personal information
- Nickname: The Clinton Clubber
- Born: Frank M. Hughes c. 1905
- Died: c. 1961 (aged c. 55) Terre Haute, Indiana, U.S.
- Weight: Light welterweight Welterweight; Middleweight

Boxing career

Boxing record
- Total fights: 187
- Wins: 120
- Win by KO: 43
- Losses: 48
- Draws: 16
- No contests: 3

Frankie Hughes (born Frank M. Hughes; c. 1905 – 1961) was an American professional boxer who competed from 1929 to 1940. He simultaneously held both the Indiana State light welterweight and welterweight titles, successfully defending both in 1932.

== Boxing career ==
Fighting out of Clinton, Indiana, for most of his career, Hughes compiled a record of 27–4–3 in his first 34 professional bouts, including victories over Red Holloway and Billy Ross, before challenging Jackie Purvis for the vacant Indiana State welterweight title on August 20, 1931. Three fights later, Hughes faced Purvis in a rematch, winning by majority decision to capture the Indiana State welterweight title. On November 5, Hughes defeated Buster Brown by technical knockout in the tenth and final round after the referee stopped the bout following a series of punishing blows that left Brown's face badly battered.

On January 11, 1932, Hughes faced Jackie Purvis in a rubber match, outpointing him over ten rounds in a non-title bout. One week later, Hughes challenged Moan Baumgartner, whom he had knocked out six months earlier, with both the Indiana State light welterweight and welterweight titles at stake. Hughes retained both titles with a ten-round decision victory. Hughes was scheduled to face Billy Wallace on April 5, but Wallace withdrew after contracting influenza and was replaced by lightweight contender and future three-division world champion Barney Ross, who outpointed Hughes over ten rounds.

On July 14, 1932, Hughes faced Hershie Wilson in the first of three consecutive meetings between the two, successfully defending both his Indiana State light welterweight and welterweight titles after dominating the final seven rounds en route to a ten-round decision victory. Hughes lost their second meeting by disqualification, while their third ended in a no contest.

On March 20, 1933, Hughes outpointed Gus Campbell over ten rounds. On April 25, he also earned a ten-round decision victory over Ray Kiser.

On January 29, 1934, Hughes outpointed Johnny Lucas over ten rounds before facing him in a rematch two weeks later in Miami, Florida, where he knocked Lucas out in the eighth round. Ten days later, he defeated Sylvan Bass by majority decision before outpointing him over ten rounds in a rematch on March 5.

In their fourth and final bout on May 27, 1935, Hughes defeated Johnny Lucas by unanimous decision over ten rounds.

Hughes was still recognized as the Indiana State champion as late as February 1937. On April 20, Hughes outpointed Scotty McLean over ten rounds.

In his final professional bout on June 24, 1940, Hughes faced future top-ranked light heavyweight and heavyweight contender Jimmy Bivins, in an eight-round middleweight contest, losing by decision.

Hughes retired from professional boxing in 1940 with a record of 120–48–16, including 43 victories by knockout, and three no contests. Between November 1933 and March 1934, he was ranked among the top ten welterweights by The Ring magazine, reaching a peak ranking of No. 8.

== Personal life ==
Hughes was married to LaVerne Anstead Hughes, with whom he had two children, Frank W. and Mary. His brother, Johnny, was also a professional boxer.

== Professional boxing record ==
| 187 fights | 120 wins | 48 losses |
|---|---|---|
| By knockout | 43 | 2 |
| By decision | 77 | 46 |
| Draws | 16 | |
| No contests | 3 | |

| No. | Result | Record | Opponent | Type | Round | Date | Location | Notes |
|---|---|---|---|---|---|---|---|---|
| 187 | Loss | 120–48–16 (3) | Jimmy Bivins | PTS | 8 | Jun 24, 1940 | Marigold Gardens Outdoor Arena, Chicago, Illinois, U.S. | |
| 186 | Win | 120–47–16 (3) | Billy Hood | RTD | 5 | Jun 17, 1940 | Jenkins, Kentucky, U.S. | |
| 185 | Win | 119–47–16 (3) | Frank McGrath | TKO | 7 | Mar 18, 1940 | Legion Coliseum, Sarasota, Florida, U.S. | |
| 184 | Win | 118–47–16 (3) | Bobby Wilson | PTS | 10 | Mar 11, 1940 | Orlando, Florida, U.S. | |
| 183 | Win | 117–47–16 (3) | Irish Johnny Dean | PTS | 10 | Mar 8, 1940 | Legion Arena, West Palm Beach, Florida, U.S. | |
| 182 | Win | 116–47–16 (3) | Nick Italo | KO | 3 | Mar 4, 1940 | Legion Coliseum, Sarasota, Florida, U.S. | |
| 181 | Loss | 115–47–16 (3) | Buster Carroll | PTS | 10 | Mar 1, 1940 | Legion Arena, West Palm Beach, Florida, U.S. | |
| 180 | Win | 115–46–16 (3) | Dummy Robinson | PTS | 8 | Feb 26, 1940 | Legion Coliseum, Sarasota, Florida, U.S. | |
| 179 | Draw | 114–46–16 (3) | Leon Foucart | PTS | 10 | Feb 19, 1940 | Legion Coliseum, Sarasota, Florida, U.S. | |
| 178 | Win | 114–46–15 (3) | Buddy Rose | PTS | 8 | Feb 12, 1940 | Legion Coliseum, Sarasota, Florida, U.S. | |
| 177 | Win | 113–46–15 (3) | Stanley Savage | PTS | 10 | Jan 9, 1940 | Duke's Arena, Fort Lauderdale, Florida, U.S. | |
| 176 | Win | 112–46–15 (3) | Babe Austin | PTS | 8 | Jan 8, 1940 | Beach Arena, Miami Beach, Florida, U.S. | |
| 175 | Draw | 111–46–15 (3) | Irish Johnny Dean | PTS | 10 | Dec 19, 1939 | Duke's Arena, Fort Lauderdale, Florida, U.S. | |
| 174 | Loss | 111–46–14 (3) | Buster Carroll | SD | 10 | Dec 4, 1939 | Beach Arena, Miami Beach, Florida, U.S. | |
| 173 | Win | 111–45–14 (3) | Bill McDowell | PTS | 10 | Jul 24, 1939 | Auditorium, Lubbock, Texas, U.S. | |
| 172 | Win | 110–45–14 (3) | Pat Childers | TKO | 6 | Jun 27, 1939 | Softball Park, Lubbock, Texas, U.S. | |
| 171 | Win | 109–45–14 (3) | Billy Pierra | PTS | 8 | Jun 9, 1939 | Sportatorium, Dallas, Texas, U.S. | |
| 170 | Win | 108–45–14 (3) | Tommy Collins | KO | 5 | May 31, 1939 | Softball Park, Lubbock, Texas, U.S. | |
| 169 | Win | 107–45–14 (3) | Gabriel Rocha | TKO | 7 | May 19, 1939 | Sportatorium, Dallas, Texas, U.S. | |
| 168 | Loss | 106–45–14 (3) | Al Bernard | UD | 10 | Apr 28, 1939 | Dallas, Texas, U.S. | |
| 167 | Loss | 106–44–14 (3) | Bill McDowell | UD | 10 | Apr 21, 1939 | Dallas, Texas, U.S. | |
| 166 | Win | 106–43–14 (3) | Sebastian Gonzalez | KO | 2 | Apr 7, 1939 | Dallas, Texas, U.S. | |
| 165 | Win | 105–43–14 (3) | Les Darby | KO | 2 | Mar 31, 1939 | Dallas, Texas, U.S. | |
| 164 | Loss | 104–43–14 (3) | Maxie Long | MD | 8 | Feb 24, 1939 | Sportatorium, Dallas, Texas, U.S. | |
| 163 | Win | 104–42–14 (3) | Sebastian Gonzalez | PTS | 6 | Feb 13, 1939 | International Arena, San Antonio, Texas, U.S. | |
| 162 | Win | 103–42–14 (3) | Felipe Vilches | KO | 3 | Jan 30, 1939 | 40 & 8 Arena, Corpus Christi, Texas, U.S. | |
| 161 | Loss | 102–42–14 (3) | Cecilio Lozada | PTS | 10 | Jan 23, 1939 | International Arena, San Antonio, Texas, U.S. | |
| 160 | Loss | 102–41–14 (3) | Cecilio Lozada | PTS | 6 | Jan 16, 1939 | International Arena, San Antonio, Texas, U.S. | |
| 159 | Draw | 102–40–14 (3) | Cecilio Lozada | PTS | 8 | Jan 11, 1939 | 40 & 8 Arena, Corpus Christi, Texas, U.S. | |
| 158 | Loss | 102–40–13 (3) | Bill McDowell | PTS | 10 | Dec 14, 1938 | 40 & 8 Arena, Corpus Christi, Texas, U.S. | |
| 157 | Win | 102–39–13 (3) | Billy Deeg | PTS | 10 | Dec 7, 1938 | 40 & 8 Arena, Corpus Christi, Texas, U.S. | |
| 156 | Win | 101–39–13 (3) | Don Eddy | PTS | 10 | Nov 23, 1938 | 40 & 8 Arena, Corpus Christi, Texas, U.S. | |
| 155 | Win | 100–39–13 (3) | Tabby Romero | TKO | 5 | Nov 22, 1938 | Olympiad Arena, Houston, Texas, U.S. | |
| 154 | Loss | 99–39–13 (3) | Carlos Garcia | PTS | 10 | Nov 9, 1938 | 40 & 8 Arena, Corpus Christi, Texas, U.S. | |
| 153 | Win | 99–38–13 (3) | Bill McDowell | KO | 6 | Sep 3, 1938 | Jenkins, Kentucky, U.S. | |
| 152 | Win | 98–38–13 (3) | George Mitchell | PTS | 6 | May 16, 1938 | Shrine Auditorium, Fort Wayne, Indiana, U.S. | |
| 151 | Loss | 97–38–13 (3) | Danny Wright | PTS | 10 | Apr 26, 1938 | Kalamazoo, Michigan, U.S. | |
| 150 | Draw | 97–37–13 (3) | Pete Petroskey | PTS | 6 | Apr 21, 1938 | Muskegon, Michigan, U.S. | |
| 149 | Loss | 97–37–12 (3) | Tony Petroskey | PTS | 10 | Mar 24, 1938 | Armory, Muskegon, Michigan, U.S. | |
| 148 | Win | 97–36–12 (3) | Tony Petroskey | PTS | 6 | Mar 8, 1938 | Armory, Muskegon, Michigan, U.S. | |
| 147 | Loss | 96–36–12 (3) | George Burnette | PTS | 10 | Feb 28, 1938 | Studebaker Clubrooms, South Bend, Indiana, U.S. | |
| 146 | Loss | 96–35–12 (3) | Gorilla Jones | UD | 10 | Jan 12, 1938 | Armory, Akron, Ohio, U.S. | |
| 145 | Win | 96–34–12 (3) | Johnny Davis | UD | 10 | Nov 29, 1937 | Columbia Gymnasium Arena, Louisville, Kentucky, U.S. | |
| 144 | Win | 95–34–12 (3) | Tommy Corbett | KO | 7 | Nov 16, 1937 | Kalamazoo, Michigan, U.S. | |
| 143 | Draw | 94–34–12 (3) | Johnny Davis | SD | 8 | Nov 1, 1937 | Columbia Gymnasium Arena, Louisville, Kentucky, U.S. | |
| 142 | Win | 94–34–11 (3) | Bobby Cortez | PTS | 6 | Jul 19, 1937 | City Auditorium, Denver, Colorado, U.S. | |
| 141 | Loss | 93–34–11 (3) | Tracy Cox | PTS | 10 | Jun 17, 1937 | Perry Stadium, Indianapolis, Indiana, U.S. | |
| 140 | Loss | 93–33–11 (3) | Honeyboy Jones | PTS | 10 | May 11, 1937 | Coliseum, St. Louis, Missouri, U.S. | |
| 139 | Win | 93–32–11 (3) | Bob Webb | KO | 5 | Apr 26, 1937 | Coliseum, Richmond, Indiana, U.S. | |
| 138 | Win | 92–32–11 (3) | Tom McVey | KO | 1 | Apr 23, 1937 | Armory, Indianapolis, Indiana, U.S. | |
| 137 | Win | 91–32–11 (3) | Scotty McLean | PTS | 10 | Apr 20, 1937 | Coliseum, St. Louis, Missouri, U.S. | |
| 136 | Win | 90–32–11 (3) | Don Custer | KO | 6 | Apr 16, 1937 | Quincy, Illinois, U.S. | |
| 135 | Win | 89–32–11 (3) | Eddie Allen | TKO | 8 | Apr 12, 1937 | Coliseum, Richmond, Indiana, U.S. | |
| 134 | Win | 88–32–11 (3) | Frank Bojarski | PTS | 10 | Mar 29, 1937 | Columbia Gymnasium Arena, Louisville, Kentucky, U.S. | |
| 133 | Win | 87–32–11 (3) | Bill McDowell | PTS | 8 | Mar 22, 1937 | Columbia Gymnasium Arena, Louisville, Kentucky, U.S. | |
| 132 | Loss | 86–32–11 (3) | Henry Rothier | PTS | 8 | Mar 12, 1937 | Rainbo Fronton, Chicago, Illinois, U.S. | |
| 131 | Win | 86–31–11 (3) | Eddie Davis | KO | 4 | Feb 25, 1937 | Tomlinson Hall, Indianapolis, Indiana, U.S. | |
| 130 | Loss | 85–31–11 (3) | Tommy Freeman | PTS | 10 | Jan 25, 1937 | Auditorium, Hot Springs, Arkansas, U.S. | |
| 129 | Win | 85–30–11 (3) | Jess McMurtry | KO | 3 | Jan 14, 1937 | Tomlinson Hall, Indianapolis, Indiana, U.S. | |
| 128 | Draw | 84–30–11 (3) | Simon Nebolsky | NWS | 10 | Jan 11, 1937 | Eagles' Club, Dayton, Ohio, U.S. | |
| 127 | Win | 84–30–10 (3) | Bill McDowell | KO | 7 | Jan 7, 1937 | Tomlinson Hall, Indianapolis, Indiana, U.S. | |
| 126 | Loss | 83–30–10 (3) | Pee Wee Jarrell | NWS | 8 | Dec 14, 1936 | Eagles' Club, Dayton, Ohio, U.S. | |
| 125 | Loss | 83–29–10 (3) | Sonny Jones | PTS | 10 | Mar 16, 1936 | Valley Arena, Holyoke, Massachusetts, U.S. | |
| 124 | Win | 83–28–10 (3) | Jack Lowery | PTS | 6 | Mar 10, 1936 | Broadway Arena, Brooklyn, New York, U.S. | |
| 123 | NC | 82–28–10 (3) | Eddie McGeever | NC | 6 | Feb 25, 1936 | New York Coliseum, Bronx, New York, U.S. | |
| 122 | Loss | 82–28–10 (2) | Andre Jessurun | UD | 10 | Feb 3, 1936 | Valley Arena, Holyoke, Massachusetts, U.S. | |
| 121 | Win | 82–27–10 (2) | Al Traino | PTS | 8 | Jan 30, 1936 | Odd Fellows' Hall, Albany, New York, U.S. | |
| 120 | Win | 81–27–10 (2) | Young Tuffy Griffiths | PTS | 10 | Dec 18, 1935 | Legion Arena, Fort Lauderdale, Florida, U.S. | |
| 119 | Win | 80–27–10 (2) | Todd Sessoms | RTD | 4 | Dec 17, 1935 | Legion Armory, St. Petersburg, Florida, U.S. | |
| 118 | Win | 79–27–10 (2) | Leo Bailey | PTS | 10 | Dec 11, 1935 | Legion Arena, Fort Lauderdale, Florida, U.S. | |
| 117 | Loss | 78–27–10 (2) | Tommy Freeman | PTS | 10 | Dec 5, 1935 | Cinderella Ballroom, Miami, Florida, U.S. | |
| 116 | Draw | 78–26–10 (2) | Joey Speigal | SD | 10 | Sep 23, 1935 | Beach Arena, Miami Beach, Florida, U.S. | |
| 115 | Draw | 78–26–9 (2) | Rufus Miles | PTS | 8 | Aug 26, 1935 | Beach Arena, Miami Beach, Florida, U.S. | |
| 114 | Loss | 78–26–8 (2) | Joey Speigal | PTS | 15 | Aug 13, 1935 | Beach Arena, Miami Beach, Florida, U.S. | |
| 113 | Win | 78–25–8 (2) | Joey Speigal | MD | 10 | Jul 29, 1935 | Beach Arena, Miami Beach, Florida, U.S. | |
| 112 | Win | 77–25–8 (2) | Honeyboy Snipes | PTS | 10 | Jul 18, 1935 | Tuttle Arena, Miami, Florida, U.S. | |
| 111 | Win | 76–25–8 (2) | Tommy Romano | PTS | 12 | Jul 9, 1935 | Beach Arena, Miami Beach, Florida, U.S. | |
| 110 | Draw | 75–25–8 (2) | Billy Hood | PTS | 8 | Jul 1, 1935 | Beach Arena, Miami Beach, Florida, U.S. | |
| 109 | Win | 75–25–7 (2) | Tommy Romano | PTS | 10 | Jun 17, 1935 | Beach Arena, Miami Beach, Florida, U.S. | |
| 108 | Win | 74–25–7 (2) | Pedro Nieves | KO | 7 | May 30, 1935 | Beach Arena, Miami Beach, Florida, U.S. | |
| 107 | Win | 73–25–7 (2) | Johnny Lucas | UD | 10 | May 27, 1935 | Cinderella Ballroom, Miami, Florida, U.S. | |
| 106 | Loss | 72–25–7 (2) | Jackie Davis | PTS | 10 | May 16, 1935 | Beach Arena, Miami Beach, Florida, U.S. | |
| 105 | Loss | 72–24–7 (2) | Lou Lombardi | SD | 10 | Apr 29, 1935 | Valley Arena, Holyoke, Massachusetts, U.S. | |
| 104 | Loss | 72–23–7 (2) | Tiger Joe Randall | UD | 8 | Apr 25, 1935 | Motor Square Garden, Pittsburgh, Pennsylvania, U.S. | |
| 103 | Win | 72–22–7 (2) | Lou Lombardi | UD | 10 | Apr 1, 1935 | Valley Arena, Holyoke, Massachusetts, U.S. | |
| 102 | Loss | 71–22–7 (2) | Ralph Fulton | PTS | 10 | Mar 1, 1935 | Cambria A.C., Philadelphia, Pennsylvania, U.S. | |
| 101 | Win | 71–21–7 (2) | Matty Mario | PTS | 10 | Dec 10, 1934 | Cinderella Ballroom, Miami, Florida, U.S. | |
| 100 | Loss | 70–21–7 (2) | Morrie Sherman | PTS | 10 | Dec 3, 1934 | Riding & Hunting Club, Washington, U.S. | |
| 99 | Draw | 70–20–7 (2) | Johnny Lucas | SD | 10 | Nov 12, 1934 | Cinderella Ballroom, Miami, Florida, U.S. | |
| 98 | Win | 70–20–6 (2) | Michele Palermo | PTS | 10 | Nov 2, 1934 | Auditorium, Washington, U.S. | |
| 97 | Loss | 69–20–6 (2) | Joey Speigal | PTS | 8 | Oct 29, 1934 | Duquesne Gardens, Pittsburgh, Pennsylvania, U.S. | |
| 96 | Win | 69–19–6 (2) | Mickey Serrian | PTS | 10 | Oct 15, 1934 | Auditorium, Washington, U.S. | |
| 95 | Win | 68–19–6 (2) | Sid Silas | PTS | 8 | Sep 24, 1934 | Riding & Hunting Club, Washington, U.S. | |
| 94 | Win | 67–19–6 (2) | Dummy Robinson | PTS | 10 | Sep 11, 1934 | Sulphur Dell, Nashville, Tennessee, U.S. | |
| 93 | Win | 66–19–6 (2) | Tiger Joe Randall | SD | 10 | Aug 27, 1934 | Hickey Park, Millvale, Pennsylvania, U.S. | |
| 92 | Win | 65–19–6 (2) | Bobby Green | RTD | 8 | Aug 21, 1934 | Hippodrome Arena, Nashville, Tennessee, U.S. | |
| 91 | Draw | 64–19–6 (2) | Dick Demaray | NWS | 8 | Aug 13, 1934 | Riverview Park, Sioux City, Iowa, U.S. | |
| 90 | Win | 64–19–5 (2) | Simon Nebolsky | PTS | 10 | Aug 6, 1934 | Hippodrome Arena, Nashville, Tennessee, U.S. | |
| 89 | Win | 63–19–5 (2) | Bobby Green | KO | 7 | Jul 30, 1934 | Hippodrome Arena, Nashville, Tennessee, U.S. | |
| 88 | Loss | 62–19–5 (2) | Johnny 'Bandit' Romero | TKO | 2 | Jun 13, 1934 | Auditorium, Oakland, California, U.S. | |
| 87 | Win | 62–18–5 (2) | Buster (Kid) Cannon | PTS | 10 | May 11, 1934 | American Legion, Pocatello, Idaho, U.S. | |
| 86 | Loss | 61–18–5 (2) | Meyer Grace | PTS | 10 | Apr 9, 1934 | Biscayne Arena, Miami, Florida, U.S. | |
| 85 | Loss | 61–17–5 (2) | Meyer Grace | PTS | 10 | Mar 26, 1934 | Biscayne Arena, Miami, Florida, U.S. | |
| 84 | Win | 61–16–5 (2) | Sylvan Bass | PTS | 10 | Mar 5, 1934 | Biscayne Arena, Miami, Florida, U.S. | |
| 83 | Win | 60–16–5 (2) | Sylvan Bass | MD | 10 | Feb 23, 1934 | Cinderella Ballroom, Miami, Florida, U.S. | |
| 82 | Win | 59–16–5 (2) | Johnny Lucas | KO | 8 | Feb 13, 1934 | Biscayne Arena, Miami, Florida, U.S. | |
| 81 | Win | 58–16–5 (2) | Johnny Lucas | PTS | 10 | Jan 29, 1934 | Biscayne Arena, Miami, Florida, U.S. | |
| 80 | Loss | 57–16–5 (2) | Eddie Wolfe | PTS | 10 | Dec 4, 1933 | Coliseum Arena, New Orleans, Louisiana, U.S. | |
| 79 | Win | 57–15–5 (2) | Don La Rue | PTS | 6 | Nov 28, 1933 | City Auditorium, Houston, Texas, U.S. | |
| 78 | Win | 56–15–5 (2) | Eddie Wolfe | PTS | 10 | Nov 14, 1933 | City Auditorium, Galveston, Texas, U.S. | |
| 77 | Win | 55–15–5 (2) | Red Rose | PTS | 10 | Nov 6, 1933 | City Auditorium, Houston, Texas, U.S. | |
| 76 | Win | 54–15–5 (2) | Al Salbano | PTS | 10 | Oct 9, 1933 | Terre Haute, Indiana, U.S. | |
| 75 | Win | 53–15–5 (2) | Jimmy Brown | PTS | 10 | Aug 31, 1933 | Quincy, Illinois, U.S. | |
| 74 | Win | 52–15–5 (2) | Rufus Miles | PTS | 10 | Aug 7, 1933 | Sullivan's Bowl, Charleston, Illinois, U.S. | |
| 73 | Loss | 51–15–5 (2) | Joe Huff | PTS | 10 | Jun 28, 1933 | Battery A Arena, St. Louis, Missouri, U.S. | |
| 72 | Draw | 51–14–5 (2) | Danny Delmont | PTS | 6 | Jun 27, 1933 | Western Stadium, Chicago, Illinois, U.S. | |
| 71 | Win | 51–14–4 (2) | Don Gonzales | RTD | 5 | Jun 20, 1933 | Western Stadium, Chicago, Illinois, U.S. | |
| 70 | Win | 50–14–4 (2) | Danny Delmont | PTS | 6 | Jun 9, 1933 | Sparta Stadium, Chicago, Illinois, U.S. | |
| 69 | Loss | 49–14–4 (2) | Bucky Lawless | PTS | 10 | May 22, 1933 | Terre Haute, Indiana, U.S. | |
| 68 | Draw | 49–13–4 (2) | Joe Huff | PTS | 8 | May 19, 1933 | Arena, St. Louis, Missouri, U.S. | |
| 67 | Win | 49–13–3 (2) | Ray Kiser | PTS | 10 | Apr 25, 1933 | Biscayne Arena, Miami, Florida, U.S. | |
| 66 | NC | 48–13–3 (2) | Manuel Quintero | NC | 10 | Apr 18, 1933 | Legion Arena, West Palm Beach, Florida, U.S. | |
| 65 | Win | 48–13–3 (1) | Cliff Greenwood | UD | 10 | Apr 10, 1933 | Biscayne Arena, Miami, Florida, U.S. | |
| 64 | Win | 47–13–3 (1) | Rufus Miles | PTS | 10 | Apr 4, 1933 | Legion Arena, West Palm Beach, Florida, U.S. | |
| 63 | Win | 46–13–3 (1) | Gus Campbell | PTS | 10 | Mar 20, 1933 | Biscayne Arena, Miami, Florida, U.S. | |
| 62 | Win | 45–13–3 (1) | Young Russell | KO | 4 | Mar 13, 1933 | Biscayne Arena, Miami, Florida, U.S. | |
| 61 | Win | 44–13–3 (1) | Spagett DeCaro | PTS | 8 | Feb 27, 1933 | Biscayne Arena, Miami, Florida, U.S. | |
| 60 | Win | 43–13–3 (1) | California Joe Rivers | PTS | 8 | Feb 13, 1933 | Biscayne Arena, Miami, Florida, U.S. | |
| 59 | Loss | 42–13–3 (1) | Joe Walker | PTS | 10 | Jan 10, 1933 | Tomlinson Hall, Indianapolis, Indiana, U.S. | |
| 58 | Win | 42–12–3 (1) | Ginger Gordon | KO | 1 | Dec 19, 1932 | Terre Haute, Indiana, U.S. | |
| 57 | Win | 41–12–3 (1) | Ginger Gordon | PTS | 10 | Dec 8, 1932 | Gibault Gym, Vincennes, Indiana, U.S. | Retained USA Indiana State light welterweight title |
| 56 | Loss | 40–12–3 (1) | Pee Wee Jarrell | PTS | 10 | Sep 19, 1932 | Fort Wayne, Indiana, U.S. | Lost USA Indiana State welterweight title |
| 55 | NC | 40–11–3 (1) | Hershie Wilson | NC | 10 | Aug 17, 1932 | Coliseum, Evansville, Indiana, U.S. | Retained USA Indiana State welterweight title |
| 54 | Loss | 40–11–3 | Hershie Wilson | DQ | 7 | Aug 1, 1932 | Breese Stevens Field, Madison, Wisconsin, U.S. | |
| 53 | Win | 40–10–3 | Hershie Wilson | PTS | 10 | Jul 14, 1932 | Armory, Muncie, Indiana, U.S. | Retained USA Indiana State light welterweight and welterweight titles |
| 52 | Win | 39–10–3 | Rosy Baker | PTS | 10 | Jul 6, 1932 | Terre Haute, Indiana, U.S. | |
| 51 | Loss | 38–10–3 | Pee Wee Jarrell | PTS | 10 | May 20, 1932 | Eagles' Club, Dayton, Ohio, U.S. | For Midwest light welterweight title |
| 50 | Loss | 38–9–3 | Roy Stevens | PTS | 10 | Apr 29, 1932 | Danville, Illinois, U.S. | |
| 49 | Loss | 38–8–3 | Dick Sisk | DQ | 7 | Apr 25, 1932 | Recreation Gym, Oshkosh, Wisconsin, U.S. | |
| 48 | Win | 38–7–3 | Buddy Bezenah | KO | 4 | Apr 22, 1932 | Eagles' Club, Dayton, Ohio, U.S. | |
| 47 | Win | 37–7–3 | Larry Kaufman | PTS | 10 | Apr 14, 1932 | Vincennes, Indiana, U.S. | |
| 46 | Loss | 36–7–3 | Barney Ross | PTS | 10 | Apr 5, 1932 | Armory, Indianapolis, Indiana, U.S. | |
| 45 | Win | 36–6–3 | Farmer Joe Cooper | PTS | 10 | Feb 29, 1932 | Terre Haute, Indiana, U.S. | |
| 44 | Win | 35–6–3 | Moan Baumgartner | PTS | 10 | Jan 18, 1932 | Anderson, Indiana, U.S. | Retained USA Indiana State welterweight title; Won USA Indiana State light welterweight title |
| 43 | Win | 34–6–3 | Jackie Purvis | PTS | 10 | Jan 11, 1932 | Parkway Theatre, Madison, Wisconsin, U.S. | |
| 42 | Win | 33–6–3 | Nick Broglio | KO | 8 | Jan 4, 1932 | Terre Haute, Indiana, U.S. | |
| 41 | Win | 32–6–3 | Allen Matthews | PTS | 10 | Nov 12, 1931 | Terre Haute, Indiana, U.S. | |
| 40 | Win | 31–6–3 | Buster Brown | TKO | 10 | Nov 5, 1931 | Avalon Ballroom, La Crosse, Wisconsin, U.S. | |
| 39 | Loss | 30–6–3 | Allen Matthews | PTS | 10 | Oct 22, 1931 | Armory, Muncie, Indiana, U.S. | |
| 38 | Win | 30–5–3 | Jackie Purvis | MD | 12 | Sep 25, 1931 | Coliseum, Evansville, Indiana, U.S. | Won USA Indiana State welterweight title |
| 37 | Win | 29–5–3 | Jimmy Lundy | TKO | 6 | Sep 21, 1931 | Olin Park, Madison, Wisconsin, U.S. | |
| 36 | Win | 28–5–3 | Babe Amos | KO | 4 | Sep 4, 1931 | Shrine Temple, Terre Haute, Indiana, U.S. | |
| 35 | Loss | 27–5–3 | Jackie Purvis | SD | 10 | Aug 20, 1931 | Bosse Field, Evansville, Indiana, U.S. | For vacant USA Indiana State welterweight title |
| 34 | Win | 27–4–3 | Prince Saunders | PTS | 10 | Aug 10, 1931 | Breese Stevens Field, Madison, Wisconsin, U.S. | |
| 33 | Win | 26–4–3 | Moan Baumgartner | KO | 5 | Jul 28, 1931 | Fort Benjamin Harrison, Lawrence, Indiana, U.S. | |
| 32 | Win | 25–4–3 | Howard Webb | TKO | 8 | Jul 22, 1931 | Bosse Field, Evansville, Indiana, U.S. | |
| 31 | Win | 24–4–3 | Billy Rose | PTS | 8 | Jul 16, 1931 | Gibault Outdoor Arena, Vincennes, Indiana, U.S. | |
| 30 | Win | 23–4–3 | Larry Kaufman | PTS | 10 | Jul 1, 1931 | Bosse Field, Evansville, Indiana, U.S. | |
| 29 | Win | 22–4–3 | Harold Schlegelmilch | TKO | 5 | Jun 23, 1931 | Fort Benjamin Harrison, Lawrence, Indiana, U.S. | |
| 28 | Draw | 21–4–3 | Nick Broglio | PTS | 8 | Jun 18, 1931 | Gibault Gym, Vincennes, Indiana, U.S. | |
| 27 | Win | 21–4–2 | Otto Atterson | KO | 2 | Jun 12, 1931 | Terre Haute, Indiana, U.S. | |
| 26 | Win | 20–4–2 | Red Holloway | KO | 3 | Apr 14, 1931 | Armory, Indianapolis, Indiana, U.S. | |
| 25 | Win | 19–4–2 | Billy Rose | NWS | 8 | Mar 11, 1931 | Terre Haute, Indiana, U.S. | |
| 24 | Win | 18–4–2 | Kristie Karr | TKO | 5 | Feb 24, 1931 | Armory, Indianapolis, Indiana, U.S. | |
| 23 | Win | 17–4–2 | Donald Fagg | NWS | 8 | Feb 3, 1931 | Armory, Indianapolis, Indiana, U.S. | |
| 22 | Draw | 16–4–2 | Ray Kiser | PTS | 8 | Jan 30, 1931 | Riverview Rink, Milwaukee, Wisconsin, U.S. | |
| 21 | Loss | 16–4–1 | Rosy Baker | KO | 2 | Jan 14, 1931 | Tomlinson Hall, Indianapolis, Indiana, U.S. | |
| 20 | Win | 16–3–1 | Roy Mitchell | NWS | 8 | Jan 6, 1931 | Armory, Indianapolis, Indiana, U.S. | |
| 19 | Win | 15–3–1 | Jackie Kane | PTS | 6 | Jan 1, 1931 | Cicero Stadium, Cicero, Illinois, U.S. | |
| 18 | Loss | 14–3–1 | Ray Wilson | NWS | 6 | Jan 1, 1931 | Cicero Stadium, Cicero, Illinois, U.S. | |
| 17 | Win | 14–2–1 | Ray Wilson | NWS | 4 | Dec 17, 1930 | Tomlinson Hall, Indianapolis, Indiana, U.S. | |
| 16 | Win | 13–2–1 | Red Holloway | NWS | 8 | Dec 16, 1930 | Armory, Indianapolis, Indiana, U.S. | |
| 15 | Loss | 12–2–1 | Jackie Kane | PTS | 6 | Dec 12, 1930 | Olympic Hall, Chicago, Illinois, U.S. | |
| 14 | Draw | 12–1–1 | Tiger Kid Purvis | NWS | 6 | Dec 10, 1930 | Kokomo Armory, Kokomo, Indiana, U.S. | |
| 13 | Win | 12–1–0 | Phil Walters | NWS | 4 | Nov 6, 1930 | Gibault Gym, Vincennes, Indiana, U.S. | |
| 12 | Win | 11–1–0 | Battling Check | KO | 2 | Oct 30, 1930 | Armory B, Oshkosh, Wisconsin, U.S. | |
| 11 | Win | 10–1–0 | Gus De Salvo | PTS | 4 | Jun 10, 1930 | Borchert Field, Milwaukee, Wisconsin, U.S. | |
| 10 | Loss | 9–1–0 | Jimmy Lundy | PTS | 6 | Jun 3, 1930 | Congress Outdoor Stadium, Chicago, Illinois, U.S. | |
| 9 | Win | 9–0–0 | George Larson | PTS | 6 | May 13, 1930 | Coliseum, Chicago, Illinois, U.S. | |
| 8 | Win | 8–0–0 | Tommy Torres | KO | 2 | Apr 29, 1930 | Congress Theater, Chicago, Illinois, U.S. | |
| 7 | Win | 7–0–0 | Johnny Panek | TKO | 5 | Apr 22, 1930 | Congress Theater, Chicago, Illinois, U.S. | |
| 6 | Win | 6–0–0 | Vic Walters | PTS | 8 | Mar 13, 1930 | Armory B, Oshkosh, Wisconsin, U.S. | |
| 5 | Win | 5–0–0 | Frankie Mucha | KO | 1 | Feb 28, 1930 | Auditorium, Milwaukee, Wisconsin, U.S. | |
| 4 | Win | 4–0–0 | Eddie Black | PTS | 4 | Jan 1, 1930 | Auditorium, Milwaukee, Wisconsin, U.S. | |
| 3 | Win | 3–0–0 | Johnny Panek | PTS | 8 | Nov 29, 1929 | Oshkosh, Wisconsin, U.S. | |
| 2 | Win | 2–0–0 | Al Kindler | KO | 4 | Oct 31, 1929 | Armory B, Oshkosh, Wisconsin, U.S. | |
| 1 | Win | 1–0–0 | Humberto Gutierrez | PTS | 4 | Sep 9, 1929 | Logan Square Baseball Park, Chicago, Illinois, U.S. | |

== See also ==
- List of male boxers
