= Gorilla Jones =

American boxer (1906–1982)

Personal information
- Nickname: Gorilla
- Born: William Landon Jones; May 12, 1906 Memphis, Tennessee, U.S.
- Died: January 4, 1982 (aged 75) Los Angeles, California, U.S.
- Height: 5 ft 9 in (1.75 m)
- Weight: Middleweight

Boxing career
- Reach: 75 in (191 cm)
- Stance: Orthodox

Boxing record
- Total fights: 172
- Wins: 109
- Win by KO: 66
- Losses: 28
- Draws: 17
- No contests: 3

William Landon Jones (May 12, 1906 – January 4, 1982), known as "Gorilla" Jones, was an American boxer who held the NBA Middleweight Boxing Championship of the World. Although he was nicknamed "Gorilla" for his exceptional reach, Jones is to be distinguished from the original "Gorilla Jones", who campaigned from 1913 to 1924 and held the World Colored Welterweight title. Jones was never knocked out. He had 52 knockouts out of his 101 wins, with over 141 total fights. He was posthumously inducted into World Boxing Hall of Fame in 1994 and the International Boxing Hall of Fame in 2009.

== Early life and career ==
Jones was born in Memphis, Tennessee, on May 12, 1906. He dropped out of school and eventually started boxing at age 18.

Jones turned professional in 1923 with Stephen "Suey" Welch as manager and trained with Joe Stanley.

Jack McVey fell to Jones on June 25, 1929, in a ten-round points decision at Boston's Braves Field before a substantial depression era crowd of 7,000. More of the fighting appeared to take place at long range, with Jones' right connecting most often, as his left was often blocked by McVey's glove. McVey's consistent aggressiveness appeared to turn the crowd in his favor, and he scored on occasion with a few left hooks to the head. The crowd booed the final decision in Jones' favor and resented his presentation of a championship belt from the Massachusetts Boxing Commission.

He lost to Jewish boxer and reigning world welterweight champion Jackie Fields on October 21, 1929, in San Francisco before a crowd of 10,000. In an action-filled ten rounds, Jones took the early lead and rocked Fields several times with straight rights to the jaw, but Fields's stamina and aggressiveness wore Jones down in the closing rounds. Fields clearly took the ninth and tenth, and had a clear edge in five rounds, but could not defend against repeated rights from Jones throughout the bout. In a match two months later on December 13, referee Joe O'Connor stopped the bout, complaining that Jones was not giving his "usual exhibition" and ordered the promoter to pay the purses for both fighters. The Boston Globe felt the fight was legitimate, however, and that Jones's long arms against Fields's desire to fight at close range made the boxers look as though they were trying to avoid coming to blows.

== World middleweight tournament, 1931 ==
On August 25, 1931, Jones defeated Tiger Thomas in a ten-round points decision in Milwaukee, in what several boxing historians would later consider a world middleweight championship bout. The bout, however, was only the first round in a tournament to determine the world middleweight champion to replace Mickey Walker. Jones showed superior speed and took a strong points margin, despite a slow start in the first few rounds. He showed better speed and superior ring craft than his opponent.

In the second round of the NBA middleweight tournament, Jones defeated Clyde Chastain in a sixth-round technical knockout on September 17, 1931. A cut above Chastain's eye caused by the lace of Jones' glove played no small part in the referee's decision to end the bout in the sixth. Jones had the advantage in three rounds, Chastain in only one, and one was even.

In a ten-round points decision in Milwaukee, Jones defeated George Nichols on November 3, 1931, in the third round of the world middleweight tournament. Though Nichols was the aggressor throughout the early rounds, Jones' great defensive work kept him out of trouble. From the fourth to seventh, Jones acted as the aggressor building up a points lead. Nichols did little damage to Jones until the seventh, landed two strong blows to the body in the ninth, and continued his offensive in the tenth, but Jones' points margin was too great to overcome. Jones was able to coast through much of the eighth and ninth, though the tenth saw both boxers trying for a knockout. The crowd of 3,500 did not find the decision entirely to their liking.

== Taking the world middleweight championship, January 1932 ==
He won the National Boxing Association World Middleweight Title vacated by Mickey Walker with a technical knockout over Oddone Piazza on January 25, 1932, in Milwaukee, Wisconsin. The match was the final round of the championship tournament to decide the new world middleweight champion. With hard rights to the head and body in the third, Jones finished the series with two hard blows to the body and one to the head indicating he was close to ending the bout. In the sixth, Jones pounded Piazza with everything he had, when a solid right put Piazza on the canvas for a count of four. When he arose, he tried to cover up when Jones continued to pound at him, but the referee wisely stopped the bout.

On March 31, 1932, Jones defeated powerful hitter Chuck Burns in a third-round knockout in Akron, Ohio. Jones floored Burns three times in the third with a flock of lefts and rights, before sending him to the mat for the fourth and final time. Burns had not been knocked out in a previous bout. The first two rounds were slow as Jones assessed his opponent, but he came out roaring in the third.

In a world middleweight title defense, Jones defeated Young Terry on April 26, 1932, in a twelve-round unanimous points decision before a partisan crowd of 7,000 rooting for Terry, at the Armory in Trenton, New Jersey. A right to the heart and a short left to the chin made Terry's knees nearly crumble in the eighth, but he avoided a knockout. Terry made Jones miss on occasion, but Jones dominated throughout the bout, took the offensive, and showed better ringcraft in the well fought bout.

=== Losing the world middleweight championship, June 1932 ===
Jones lost the belt later that year on June 11 in Paris, to Frenchman Marcel Thil from an eleventh round disqualification. The New York Times wrote that Jones was losing on points when he was disqualified after having been warned for holding and hitting low. The crowd of 70,000 was the largest to attend a prize fight in Paris for years.

On April 19, 1933, Jones fought a six-round no contest against Jewish boxer Ben Jeby, reigning world middlweight champion, before a crowd of 8,000 at Public Hall in Cleveland, Ohio. The referee stopped the bout because of a lack of effort from both fighters.

== Taking the American middleweight championship, January 1933 ==
Jones won the American Middleweight Championship in a seventh-round knockout against Sammy Slaughter on January 30, 1933, in Cleveland. The title was recognized by the National Boxing Association, but was a national and not a world title, as some reporters later claimed. In the second through sixth, Jones either gained a margin or coasted waiting to strike a telling blow against his opponent. In the fifth and sixth, Slaughter reached Jones' face with high overhand rights which affected the judges' scoring more than Jones. Finally in the sixth, Jones ended the bout with a right to the nose, and a hard right to the jaw, followed by a lighter side blow to the jaw that put Slaughter down for the count.

== Final attempt at world middleweight championship, January 1937 ==
On New Year's Day 1937, he took on Freddie Steele, the National Boxing Association World Middleweight and NYSAC World Middleweight Title holder, in a title match, but lost in a tenth round unanimous decision. Before a disappointing crowd of 4,000, Steele scored repeatedly with long lefts and right crosses to the head. After a left to the face, Steele dropped Jones in the third with a crushing right to the chin, but Jones was up quickly. From the fourth through the tenth, Steele was the aggressor and built a comfortable points margin. Steele was awarded all but one round from Jones, who took only the second. Jones had previously lost to Steele on September 17, 1935, in a ten-round unanimous decision in Seattle. On May 22, 1934, the two had fought a ten-round decision on points in Seattle.

On August 9, 1937, Jones defeated former world welterweight champion Tommy Freeman in a ten-round points decision in Council Bluffs, Iowa. In a slow feature bout, Jones took most of the offensive from the third round on.

Jones lost to former middleweight champion Babe Risko on May 10, 1938, in a ten-round points decision in Akron, Ohio, before a modest crowd of 1,538. Jones was tagged repeatedly by Risko, a heavier boxer with a longer reach. Risko's left jab, which frequently led to following rights was a problem for Jones throughout the bout though he took a number of rounds in the close bout. Jones took quite a beating in the fifth, and performed his best in the seventh, though Risko had enough points to use his left jab for defense to coast a bit in the final two rounds.

His last win was two years later on January 24, 1939, against Angelo Puglisi, a ten-round points decision in Seattle. After his last fight, a loss to Vern Earling on May 29, 1940, he retired from boxing. Jones was already beginning to have mild vision problems from cataracts.

== Life and work after boxing ==
Jones performed some training duties from the mid- to late 1940s until the 1970s, working with Milo Savage, Johnny Wells, Irish Bob Murphy, and later with Suey Welch's boxer Gil King during the early 1970s. Jones served in WWII. In the 1950s, he taught boxing at the Boys Club in Watts. After the war, he worked for Mae West, whom he had known since he was 22, becoming her friend, chauffeur and bodyguard. West was his employer, friend and supporter until her death in 1980. Jones suffered from failing eyesight in his later years from diabetes. He was also among many boxers who attended the funeral of Feab S. Williams (better known as "George Godfrey").

== Death ==
Jones died from arteriosclerosis and diabetes at his home near MacArthur Park on January 4, 1982, in Los Angeles, California, at the age of 75. He was buried in Evergreen Cemetery in East Los Angeles.

== Professional boxing record ==
All information in this section is derived from BoxRec, unless otherwise stated.

=== Official record ===
172 fights	109 wins	28 losses
By knockout	66	0
By decision	43	22
By disqualification	0	6
Draws	17	
No contests	3	
Newspaper decisions/draws	15	

All newspaper decisions are officially regarded as “no decision” bouts and are not counted in the win/loss/draw column.

No.	Result	Record	Opponent	Type	Round	Date	Location	Notes
172	Loss	109–28–17 (18)	Vern Earling	PTS	10	May 29, 1940	Kellogg, Idaho, U.S.	
171	Win	109–27–17 (18)	Angelo Puglisi	PTS	10	Jan 4, 1939	Crystal Pool, Seattle, Washington, U.S.	
170	Loss	108–27–17 (18)	Alabama Kid	UD	10	Jun 9, 1938	Memorial Hall, Dover, Ohio, U.S.	
169	Loss	108–26–17 (18)	Eddie Babe Risko	PTS	10	May 10, 1938	Armory, Akron, Ohio, U.S.	
168	Draw	108–25–17 (18)	King Wyatt	PTS	10	Apr 4, 1938	Shrine Auditorium, Fort Wayne, Indiana, U.S.	
167	Win	108–25–16 (18)	Jack Moran	PTS	10	Mar 31, 1938	Armory, Akron, Ohio, U.S.	
166	Win	107–25–16 (18)	Johnny Davis	TKO	8 (10)	Feb 16, 1938	Armory, Akron, Ohio, U.S.	
165	Win	106–25–16 (18)	Pedro Carsonia	KO	2 (10)	Jan 19, 1938	Columbia Gymnasium Arena, Louisville, Kentucky, U.S.	
164	Win	105–25–16 (18)	Frankie Hughes	UD	10	Jan 12, 1938	Armory, Akron, Ohio, U.S.	
163	Win	104–25–16 (18)	Bob Turner	UD	10	Dec 15, 1937	Armory, Akron, Ohio, U.S.	
162	Loss	103–25–16 (18)	Alabama Kid	PTS	10	Nov 23, 1937	Springfield, Ohio, U.S.	Billed as Negro middleweight world title fight
161	Win	103–24–16 (18)	Andy Miller	NWS	8	Oct 27, 1937	Auditorium, Sioux City, Iowa, U.S.	
160	Win	103–24–16 (17)	Vernon Nelson	KO	3 (10)	Sep 6, 1937	Oskaloosa, Iowa, U.S.	
159	Win	102–24–16 (17)	Tommy Freeman	PTS	10	Aug 9, 1937	Broadway Baseball Park, Council Bluffs, Iowa, U.S.	
158	Win	101–24–16 (17)	Frankie Misko	TKO	5 (10)	Jul 7, 1937	Uptown Arena, Sioux City, Iowa, U.S.	
157	Win	100–24–16 (17)	Vernon Nelson	KO	4 (10)	Apr 13, 1937	Ak-sar-ben Coliseum, Omaha, Nebraska, U.S.	
156	Draw	99–24–16 (17)	Frank Battaglia	PTS	10	Jan 29, 1937	Auditorium, Milwaukee, Wisconsin, U.S.	
155	Loss	99–24–15 (17)	Freddie Steele	UD	10	Jan 1, 1937	Auditorium, Milwaukee, Wisconsin, U.S.	For NBA and NYSAC middleweight titles
154	Win	99–23–15 (17)	Mickey Bottone	KO	1 (10)	Dec 4, 1936	Auditorium, Milwaukee, Wisconsin, U.S.	
153	Draw	98–23–15 (17)	Art Taylor	PTS	10	Aug 5, 1936	Labor Temple, Tucson, Arizona, U.S.	
152	Win	98–23–14 (17)	Tait Littman	TKO	10 (10)	Jan 27, 1936	Auditorium, Milwaukee, Wisconsin, U.S.	
151	Win	97–23–14 (17)	Tait Littman	KO	1 (10)	Jan 1, 1936	Auditorium, Milwaukee, Wisconsin, U.S.	
150	Loss	96–23–14 (17)	Freddie Steele	UD	10	Sep 17, 1935	Civic Ice Arena, Seattle, Washington, U.S.	
149	Loss	96–22–14 (17)	Oscar Rankins	PTS	10	Aug 21, 1934	Olympic Auditorium, Los Angeles, California, U.S.	
148	Loss	96–21–14 (17)	Emilio Martinez	PTS	10	Jun 18, 1934	Denver, Colorado, U.S.	
147	Draw	96–20–14 (17)	Freddie Steele	PTS	10	May 22, 1934	Civic Ice Arena, Seattle, Washington, U.S.	
146	Loss	96–20–13 (17)	Frank R. Weimer	PTS	10	Feb 23, 1934	Coliseum, San Diego, California, U.S.	
145	Win	96–19–13 (17)	Tony Poloni	PTS	10	Jan 16, 1934	Olympic Auditorium, Los Angeles, California, U.S.	
144	Win	95–19–13 (17)	Frankie Remus	KO	6 (10)	Dec 5, 1933	Crystal Pool, Seattle, Washington, U.S.	
143	Win	94–19–13 (17)	Eddie Murdock	TKO	10 (10)	Oct 27, 1933	Coliseum, San Diego, California, U.S.	
142	Win	93–19–13 (17)	Lou Bertman	KO	2 (10)	Oct 12, 1933	Madison Square Garden, Phoenix, Arizona, U.S.	
141	Win	92–19–13 (17)	Mike Payan	PTS	10	Oct 6, 1933	Coliseum, San Diego, California, U.S.	
140	Win	91–19–13 (17)	Billy Papke Jr	KO	8 (10)	Sep 21, 1933	Pasadena Arena, Pasadena, California, U.S.	
139	Win	90–19–13 (17)	Johnny Romero	KO	3 (10)	Sep 15, 1933	Coliseum, San Diego, California, U.S.	
138	Win	89–19–13 (17)	Manuel Victoria	TKO	7 (15)	Sep 3, 1933	Foreign Club Arena, Tijuana, Baja California, Mexico	
137	Draw	88–19–13 (17)	Hal Hoxwood	PTS	10	Aug 25, 1933	McCullough's Arena, Salt Lake City, Utah, U.S.	
136	Draw	88–19–12 (17)	Vearl Whitehead	PTS	10	Aug 8, 1933	Olympic Auditorium, Los Angeles, California, U.S.	
135	Loss	88–19–11 (17)	Vearl Whitehead	DQ	10 (10)	Jul 28, 1933	Dreamland Auditorium, San Francisco, California, U.S.	
134	Win	88–18–11 (17)	Wesley Ketchell	PTS	10	Jul 18, 1933	Olympic Auditorium, Los Angeles, California, U.S.	
133	Win	87–18–11 (17)	Babe Marino	KO	10 (10)	Jun 30, 1933	Dreamland Auditorium, San Francisco, California, U.S.	
132	NC	86–18–11 (17)	Ben Jeby	NC	6 (12)	Apr 19, 1933	Public Hall, Cleveland, Ohio, U.S.	The Cleveland Boxing Commissioners ordered Block to halt the fight due to the lack of effort from both fighters
131	Win	86–18–11 (16)	Willie Oster	KO	3 (10)	Feb 28, 1933	Convention Hall, Toledo, Ohio, U.S.	
130	Win	85–18–11 (16)	Rosy Baker	PTS	10	Feb 21, 1933	Tomlinson Hall, Indianapolis, Indiana, U.S.	
129	Win	84–18–11 (16)	Sammy Slaughter	KO	7 (12)	Jan 30, 1933	Public Hall, Cleveland, Ohio, U.S.	Won vacant American middleweight title
128	Win	83–18–11 (16)	Young Stuhley	KO	4 (10)	Jan 13, 1933	Clinton, Iowa, U.S.	
127	Draw	82–18–11 (16)	Tommy Freeman	PTS	10	Dec 26, 1932	Motor Square Garden, Pittsburgh, Pennsylvania, U.S.	
126	Win	82–18–10 (16)	Willie Oster	NWS	10	Dec 1, 1932	Coliseum, Davenport, Iowa, U.S.	
125	Win	82–18–10 (15)	Jackie Purvis	KO	3 (10)	Nov 24, 1932	Armory, Akron, Ohio, U.S.	
124	Win	81–18–10 (15)	Johnny Peppe	PTS	8	Oct 3, 1932	Convention Hall, Atlantic City, New Jersey, U.S.	
123	Win	80–18–10 (15)	Kid Leonard	NWS	10	Aug 29, 1932	Palmer School Arena, Davenport, Iowa, U.S.	
122	Win	80–18–10 (14)	Jack December	KO	2 (6)	Aug 9, 1932	Public Hall, Cleveland, Ohio, U.S.	
121	Loss	79–18–10 (14)	Marcel Thil	DQ	11 (15)	Jun 11, 1932	Parc des Princes, Paris, Paris, France	Lost NBA middleweight title; For vacant IBU and The Ring middleweight titles
120	Win	79–17–10 (14)	Young Terry	PTS	12	Apr 26, 1932	Armory, Trenton, New Jersey, U.S.	Retained NBA middleweight title
119	Win	78–17–10 (14)	Bud Saltis	PTS	10	Apr 7, 1932	Columbus Community Club, Green Bay, Wisconsin, U.S.	
118	Win	77–17–10 (14)	Chuck Burns	KO	3 (10)	Mar 31, 1932	Armory, Akron, Ohio, U.S.	
117	Loss	76–17–10 (14)	Frankie O'Brien	DQ	8 (10)	Mar 14, 1932	Valley Arena, Holyoke, Massachusetts, U.S.	
116	Win	76–16–10 (14)	Oddone Piazza	TKO	6 (10)	Jan 25, 1932	Auditorium, Milwaukee, Wisconsin, U.S.	Won vacant NBA middleweight title
115	Win	75–16–10 (14)	Henry Firpo	SD	10	Dec 11, 1931	Auditorium, Milwaukee, Wisconsin, U.S.	
114	Win	74–16–10 (14)	Frankie O'Brien	PTS	10	Nov 19, 1931	Auditorium, Milwaukee, Wisconsin, U.S.	
113	Win	73–16–10 (14)	George Nichols	PTS	10	Nov 3, 1931	Auditorium, Milwaukee, Wisconsin, U.S.	
112	Win	72–16–10 (14)	Johnny Roberts	KO	3 (10)	Oct 21, 1931	Armory, Akron, Ohio, U.S.	
111	Win	71–16–10 (14)	Clyde Chastain	TKO	6 (10)	Sep 17, 1931	Auditorium, Milwaukee, Wisconsin, U.S.	
110	Win	70–16–10 (14)	Tiger Thomas	PTS	10	Aug 25, 1931	Borchert Field, Milwaukee, Wisconsin, U.S.	
109	Loss	69–16–10 (14)	Thomas Lawless	PTS	10	May 25, 1931	Chicago Stadium, Chicago, Illinois, U.S.	
108	Win	69–15–10 (14)	Ham Jenkins	NWS	10	Apr 28, 1931	Kansas City, Missouri, U.S.	
107	Win	69–15–10 (13)	Paul Pirrone	PTS	10	Apr 14, 1931	Public Hall, Cleveland, Ohio, U.S.	
106	Win	68–15–10 (13)	Buddy Gorman	PTS	10	Mar 11, 1931	Auditorium, Oakland, California, U.S.	
105	Win	67–15–10 (13)	Herman Ratzlaff	UD	10	Feb 17, 1931	Auditorium, Portland, Oregon, U.S.	
104	Win	66–15–10 (13)	Frank Rowsey	TKO	8 (10)	Feb 6, 1931	Dreamland Auditorium, San Francisco, California, U.S.	
103	Win	65–15–10 (13)	Mike Hector	PTS	10	Jan 30, 1931	Stockton, California, U.S.	
102	Draw	64–15–10 (13)	Chick Devlin	PTS	10	Jan 23, 1931	Dreamland Auditorium, San Francisco, California, U.S.	
101	Win	64–15–9 (13)	Young Johnny Burns	TKO	7 (10)	Jan 13, 1931	Auditorium, Oakland, California, U.S.	
100	Win	63–15–9 (13)	Clyde Chastain	KO	4 (10)	Dec 26, 1930	Armory, Akron, Ohio, U.S.	
99	Loss	62–15–9 (13)	Jackie Brady	PTS	10	Nov 28, 1930	Carney Auditorium, Erie, Pennsylvania, U.S.	
98	Win	62–14–9 (13)	Meyer Lichtenstein	SD	10	Nov 10, 1930	Convention Hall, Rochester, New York, U.S.	
97	Loss	61–14–9 (13)	Harry Smith	PTS	10	Oct 23, 1930	Olympia Boxing Club, Manhattan, New York City, New York, U.S.	
96	Win	61–13–9 (13)	Cowboy Jack Willis	NWS	10	Sep 15, 1930	Canton Auditorium, Canton, Ohio, U.S.	
95	NC	61–13–9 (12)	Harry Smith	NC	9 (12)	Sep 4, 1930	Queensboro Stadium, Long Island City, Queens, New York City, New York, U.S.	Billed for the colored middleweight championship of the world
94	Win	61–13–9 (11)	Ham Jenkins	PTS	10	Aug 15, 1930	Denver, Colorado, U.S.	
93	Draw	60–13–9 (11)	Manuel Quintero	PTS	10	Aug 8, 1930	Dreamland Auditorium, San Francisco, California, U.S.	
92	Win	60–13–8 (11)	Thomas Lawless	KO	9 (10)	Jul 18, 1930	Dreamland Auditorium, San Francisco, California, U.S.	
91	Win	59–13–8 (11)	Vincent Forgione	PTS	10	Jun 25, 1930	Taylor Bowl, Newburgh Heights, Ohio, U.S.	
90	Win	58–13–8 (11)	Henry Goldberg	PTS	10	Jun 2, 1930	Heywood Arena, West Springfield, Massachusetts, U.S.	
89	Win	57–13–8 (11)	Vincent Forgione	PTS	10	May 26, 1930	Meyers Bowl, North Braddock, Pennsylvania, U.S.	
88	Loss	56–13–8 (11)	Thomas Lawless	PTS	10	May 12, 1930	Valley Arena, Holyoke, Massachusetts, U.S.	
87	Loss	56–12–8 (11)	Tiger Roy Williams	PTS	12	Apr 22, 1930	Memorial Hall, Dayton, Ohio, U.S.	
86	Win	56–11–8 (11)	Gene Cardi	TKO	7 (10)	Apr 14, 1930	Wheeling, West Virginia, U.S.	
85	Win	55–11–8 (11)	Jock Malone	NWS	10	Mar 17, 1930	Saint Paul, Minnesota, U.S.	
84	Win	55–11–8 (10)	Meyer Grace	TKO	3 (10)	Mar 14, 1930	Armory, Akron, Ohio, U.S.	
83	Win	54–11–8 (10)	Wesley Ketchell	PTS	10	Feb 14, 1930	Dreamland Auditorium, San Francisco, California, U.S.	
82	Draw	53–11–8 (10)	Eddie Roberts	PTS	10	Feb 7, 1930	Dreamland Auditorium, San Francisco, California, U.S.	
81	Win	53–11–7 (10)	Izzy Grove	KO	7 (10)	Jan 27, 1930	St. Nicholas Arena, Manhattan, New York City, New York, U.S.	
80	Win	52–11–7 (10)	Floyd Hybert	TKO	3 (10)	Jan 17, 1930	Valley Arena, Holyoke, Massachusetts, U.S.	
79	Win	51–11–7 (10)	Billy Angelo	PTS	10	Jan 1, 1930	Arena, Philadelphia, Pennsylvania, U.S.	
78	NC	50–11–7 (10)	Jackie Fields	NC	7 (10)	Dec 13, 1929	Boston Garden, Boston, Massachusetts, U.S.	
77	Win	50–11–7 (9)	Nick Testo	KO	6 (10)	Dec 4, 1929	Armory, Akron, Ohio, U.S.	
76	Loss	49–11–7 (9)	Jackie Fields	PTS	10	Oct 21, 1929	State Armory, San Francisco, California, U.S.	
75	Win	49–10–7 (9)	Jackie Horner	KO	2 (10)	Oct 9, 1929	Armory, Akron, Ohio, U.S.	
74	Win	48–10–7 (9)	Fred Mahan	KO	6 (10)	Aug 20, 1929	Olympic Auditorium, Los Angeles, California, U.S.	
73	Win	47–10–7 (9)	Pete Meyers	TKO	5 (10)	Aug 12, 1929	State Armory, San Francisco, California, U.S.	
72	Win	46–10–7 (9)	Jack Lewis	KO	3 (8)	Jul 29, 1929	Memphis, Tennessee, U.S.	
71	Loss	45–10–7 (9)	Thomas Lawless	PTS	12	Jul 16, 1929	Taylor Bowl, Newburgh Heights, Ohio, U.S.	
70	Win	45–9–7 (9)	Jack McVey	PTS	10	Jun 25, 1929	Braves Field, Boston, Massachusetts, U.S.	
69	Win	44–9–7 (9)	Al Mello	TKO	6 (10)	Jun 3, 1929	Boston Garden, Boston, Massachusetts, U.S.	
68	Win	43–9–7 (9)	Izzy Grove	TKO	6 (10)	May 17, 1929	Madison Square Garden, Manhattan, New York City, New York, U.S.	
67	Win	42–9–7 (9)	Al Mello	PTS	10	May 3, 1929	Madison Square Garden, Manhattan, New York City, New York, U.S.	
66	Draw	41–9–7 (9)	Tommy Freeman	PTS	12	Apr 9, 1929	Public Hall, Cleveland, Ohio, U.S.	
65	Win	41–9–6 (9)	George Fifield	KO	1 (?)	Apr 2, 1929	Armory, Akron, Ohio, U.S.	
64	Win	40–9–6 (9)	Joe Zelinski	KO	5 (10)	Mar 11, 1929	Valley Arena, Holyoke, Massachusetts, U.S.	
63	Loss	39–9–6 (9)	Nick Testo	DQ	5 (10)	Feb 25, 1929	Valley Arena, Holyoke, Massachusetts, U.S.	
62	Loss	39–8–6 (9)	Thomas Lawless	PTS	10	Feb 18, 1929	Broadway Auditorium, Buffalo, U.S.	
61	Win	39–7–6 (9)	Jack Murphy	KO	4 (6)	Feb 15, 1929	Carney Auditorium, Erie, Pennsylvania, U.S.	
60	Win	38–7–6 (9)	Arthur Schaekels	PTS	10	Jan 14, 1929	Broadway Auditorium, Buffalo, New York, U.S.	
59	Win	37–7–6 (9)	Arthur Schaekels	KO	1 (10)	Jan 8, 1929	Public Hall, Cleveland, Ohio, U.S.	
58	Draw	36–7–6 (9)	Tony Vaccarelli	PTS	10	Dec 28, 1928	Madison Square Garden, Manhattan, New York City, New York, U.S.	
57	Win	36–7–5 (9)	Pal Silvers	PTS	8	Nov 16, 1928	Madison Square Garden, Manhattan, New York City, New York, U.S.	
56	Win	35–7–5 (9)	Jimmy Finley	NWS	10	Nov 2, 1928	Armory, Akron, Ohio, U.S.	
55	Win	35–7–5 (8)	Thomas Lawless	PTS	10	Oct 19, 1928	Erie, Pennsylvania, U.S.	
54	Win	34–7–5 (8)	Billy Leonard	KO	1 (10)	Oct 5, 1928	Armory, Akron, Ohio, U.S.	
53	Win	33–7–5 (8)	Heavy Andrews	PTS	10	Sep 28, 1928	Erie, Pennsylvania, U.S.	
52	Win	32–7–5 (8)	Bobby LaSalle	SD	10	Sep 18, 1928	Taylor Bowl, Newburgh Heights, Ohio, U.S.	
51	Win	31–7–5 (8)	Tommy Freeman	SD	10	Aug 15, 1928	Taylor Bowl, Newburgh Heights, Ohio, U.S.	
50	Loss	30–7–5 (8)	Sergeant Sammy Baker	UD	10	Jul 17, 1928	Olympic Arena, Brooklyn, New York City, New York, U.S.	
49	Win	30–6–5 (8)	Billy Alger	NWS	10	Jun 25, 1928	Armory, Akron, U.S.	
48	Win	30–6–5 (7)	Lowell Bobby Brown	TKO	2 (10)	Jun 13, 1928	Olympic Arena, Brooklyn, New York City, New York, U.S.	
47	Win	29–6–5 (7)	Ben Spivey	TKO	6 (10)	May 28, 1928	Company A Armory, Marietta, Ohio, U.S.	
46	Loss	28–6–5 (7)	Lowell Bobby Brown	PTS	8	May 14, 1928	Public Hall, Cleveland, Ohio, U.S.	
45	Win	28–5–5 (7)	Mickey Fedor	TKO	7 (8)	May 7, 1928	Armory, Akron, Ohio, U.S.	
44	Win	27–5–5 (7)	Harry Williams	TKO	4 (6)	Apr 26, 1928	Armory, Akron, Ohio, U.S.	
43	Win	26–5–5 (7)	Buck McMillan	TKO	3 (8)	Apr 12, 1928	Canton, Ohio, U.S.	
42	Win	25–5–5 (7)	Ben Spivey	KO	4 (?)	Apr 9, 1928	Marietta, Ohio, U.S.	
41	Win	24–5–5 (7)	Joe Feldman	KO	1 (6)	Mar 19, 1928	Public Hall, Cleveland, Ohio, U.S.	
40	Win	23–5–5 (7)	Allen Beatty	NWS	6	Mar 16, 1928	Armory, Akron, Ohio, U.S.	
39	Win	23–5–5 (6)	Sailor Dan Maxwell	KO	4 (?)	Mar 1, 1928	Canton, Ohio, U.S.	
38	Win	22–5–5 (6)	Hank Graham	KO	1 (6)	Feb 29, 1928	Armory, Akron, Ohio, U.S.	
37	Win	21–5–5 (6)	Black Fitzsimmons	KO	3 (?)	Feb 23, 1928	Barberton, Ohio, U.S.	
36	Win	20–5–5 (6)	Al Jackson	PTS	6	Feb 13, 1928	Public Hall, Cleveland, Ohio, U.S.	
35	Loss	19–5–5 (6)	Young Saylor	NWS	12	Jan 26, 1928	Auditorium, Marietta, Ohio, U.S.	
34	Win	19–5–5 (5)	Arvin Spence	TKO	2 (4)	Jan 17, 1928	Public Hall, Cleveland, Ohio, U.S.	
33	Win	18–5–5 (5)	George Moore	KO	5 (?)	Jan 2, 1928	Akron, Ohio, U.S.	
32	Win	17–5–5 (5)	Paul Wanzo	KO	3 (3)	Dec 27, 1927	Marietta, Ohio, U.S.	
31	Win	16–5–5 (5)	Polish Wonder	TKO	3 (3)	Dec 27, 1927	Marietta, Ohio, U.S.	
30	Win	15–5–5 (5)	Jeff Baulknight	PTS	6	Dec 7, 1927	Public Hall, Cleveland, Ohio, U.S.	
29	Win	14–5–5 (5)	Gunner Johnson	NWS	6	Sep 19, 1927	Armory, Akron, Ohio, U.S.	
28	Win	14–5–5 (4)	Marvin Morrison	NWS	10	May 26, 1927	Armory, Akron, Ohio, U.S.	
27	Win	14–5–5 (3)	Marvin Morrison	NWS	10	May 3, 1927	Armory, Akron, Ohio, U.S.	
26	Win	14–5–5 (2)	Sam Bruce	PTS	8	Apr 7, 1927	Memphis Stadium, Memphis, Tennessee, U.S.	
25	Win	13–5–5 (2)	Cyclone Williams	PTS	8	Jan 31, 1927	Memphis Stadium, Memphis, Tennessee, U.S.	
24	Win	12–5–5 (2)	Kid Roux	PTS	8	Dec 13, 1926	Memphis Stadium, Memphis, Tennessee, U.S.	
23	Win	11–5–5 (2)	Cyclone Williams	PTS	8	Nov 28, 1926	Memphis Stadium, Memphis, Tennessee, U.S.	
22	Win	10–5–5 (2)	Kid Roux	NWS	8	Oct 22, 1926	Greenville Stadium, Greenville, Mississippi, U.S.	
21	Win	10–5–5 (1)	Cyclone Williams	KO	4 (8)	Oct 4, 1926	Memphis Stadium, Memphis, Tennessee, U.S.	
20	Win	9–5–5 (1)	Young Sharkey	TKO	7 (8)	Sep 17, 1926	Greenville Stadium, Greenville, Mississippi, U.S.	
19	Draw	8–5–5 (1)	Kid Roux	PTS	8	Jul 26, 1926	Memphis Stadium, Memphis, Tennessee, U.S.	
18	Win	8–5–4 (1)	Kid Lucius	TKO	3 (8)	Apr 19, 1926	Memphis Stadium, Memphis, Tennessee, U.S.	
17	Win	7–5–4 (1)	Billy Cannon	KO	2 (8)	Feb 1, 1926	Hot Springs, Arkansas, U.S.	
16	Draw	6–5–4 (1)	Kid Roux	PTS	8	Jan 11, 1926	Southern A.C., Memphis, Tennessee, U.S.	
15	Win	6–5–3 (1)	Kid Bruce	PTS	8	Nov 16, 1925	Southern A.C., Memphis, Tennessee, U.S.	
14	Loss	5–5–3 (1)	Harry Bettin	PTS	8	Nov 10, 1925	Memphis Stadium, Memphis, Tennessee, U.S.	
13	Loss	5–4–3 (1)	Kid Sharkey	DQ	3 (8)	Nov 3, 1925	Memphis, Tennessee, U.S.	
12	Draw	5–3–3 (1)	Kid Roux	PTS	8	Jul 13, 1925	Southern A.C., Memphis, Tennessee, U.S.	
11	Draw	5–3–2 (1)	Kid Bruce	PTS	8	May 18, 1925	Southern A.C., Memphis, Tennessee, U.S.	
10	Win	5–3–1 (1)	George Dixon	TKO	6 (8)	May 4, 1925	Southern A.C., Memphis, Tennessee, U.S.	
9	Win	4–3–1 (1)	Joe Walcott	KO	1 (8)	Apr 6, 1925	Southern A.C., Memphis, Tennessee, U.S.	
8	Loss	3–3–1 (1)	Clyde Edmundsen	NWS	10	Mar 16, 1925	Hot Springs, Arkansas, U.S.	
7	Win	3–3–1	George Dixon	KO	2 (8)	Feb 9, 1925	Southern A.C., Memphis, Tennessee, U.S.	
6	Loss	2–3–1	Sam Bruce	PTS	8	Dec 1, 1924	Southern A.C., Memphis, Tennessee, U.S.	
5	Win	2–2–1	Fast Black	KO	3 (6)	Nov 10, 1924	Southern A.C., Memphis, Tennessee, U.S.	
4	Loss	1–2–1	George Dixon	DQ	3 (8)	Nov 3, 1924	Southern A.C., Memphis, Tennessee, U.S.	
3	Win	1–1–1	Fast Black	PTS	8	Sep 22, 1924	Southern A.C., Memphis, Tennessee, U.S.	
2	Draw	0–1–1	Kid Bruce	PTS	8	Sep 15, 1924	Southern A.C., Memphis, Tennessee, U.S.	
1	Loss	0–1	Sam Bruce	PTS	8	Aug 11, 1924	Southern A.C., Memphis, Tennessee, U.S.	

=== Unofficial record ===
172 fights	122 wins	30 losses
By knockout	66	0
By decision	56	24
By disqualification	0	6
Draws	17	
No contests	3	

Record with the inclusion of newspaper decisions in the win/loss/draw column.

No.	Result	Record	Opponent	Type	Round	Date	Location	Notes
172	Loss	122–30–17 (3)	Vern Earling	PTS	10	May 29, 1940	Kellogg, Idaho, U.S.	
171	Win	122–29–17 (3)	Angelo Puglisi	PTS	10	Jan 4, 1939	Crystal Pool, Seattle, Washington, U.S.	
170	Loss	121–29–17 (3)	Alabama Kid	UD	10	Jun 9, 1938	Memorial Hall, Dover, Ohio, U.S.	
169	Loss	121–28–17 (3)	Eddie Babe Risko	PTS	10	May 10, 1938	Armory, Akron, Ohio, U.S.	
168	Draw	121–27–17 (3)	King Wyatt	PTS	10	Apr 4, 1938	Shrine Auditorium, Fort Wayne, Indiana, U.S.	
167	Win	121–27–16 (3)	Jack Moran	PTS	10	Mar 31, 1938	Armory, Akron, Ohio, U.S.	
166	Win	120–27–16 (3)	Johnny Davis	TKO	8 (10)	Feb 16, 1938	Armory, Akron, Ohio, U.S.	
165	Win	119–27–16 (3)	Pedro Carsonia	KO	2 (10)	Jan 19, 1938	Columbia Gymnasium Arena, Louisville, Kentucky, U.S.	
164	Win	118–27–16 (3)	Frankie Hughes	UD	10	Jan 12, 1938	Armory, Akron, Ohio, U.S.	
163	Win	117–27–16 (3)	Bob Turner	UD	10	Dec 15, 1937	Armory, Akron, Ohio, U.S.	
162	Loss	116–27–16 (3)	Alabama Kid	PTS	10	Nov 23, 1937	Springfield, Ohio, U.S.	Billed as Negro middleweight world title fight
161	Win	116–26–16 (3)	Andy Miller	NWS	8	Oct 27, 1937	Auditorium, Sioux City, Iowa, U.S.	
160	Win	115–26–16 (3)	Vernon Nelson	KO	3 (10)	Sep 6, 1937	Oskaloosa, Iowa, U.S.	
159	Win	114–26–16 (3)	Tommy Freeman	PTS	10	Aug 9, 1937	Broadway Baseball Park, Council Bluffs, Iowa, U.S.	
158	Win	113–26–16 (3)	Frankie Misko	TKO	5 (10)	Jul 7, 1937	Uptown Arena, Sioux City, Iowa, U.S.	
157	Win	112–26–16 (3)	Vernon Nelson	KO	4 (10)	Apr 13, 1937	Ak-sar-ben Coliseum, Omaha, Nebraska, U.S.	
156	Draw	111–26–16 (3)	Frank Battaglia	PTS	10	Jan 29, 1937	Auditorium, Milwaukee, Wisconsin, U.S.	
155	Loss	111–26–15 (3)	Freddie Steele	UD	10	Jan 1, 1937	Auditorium, Milwaukee, Wisconsin, U.S.	For NBA and NYSAC middleweight titles
154	Win	111–25–15 (3)	Mickey Bottone	KO	1 (10)	Dec 4, 1936	Auditorium, Milwaukee, Wisconsin, U.S.	
153	Draw	110–25–15 (3)	Art Taylor	PTS	10	Aug 5, 1936	Labor Temple, Tucson, Arizona, U.S.	
152	Win	110–25–14 (3)	Tait Littman	TKO	10 (10)	Jan 27, 1936	Auditorium, Milwaukee, Wisconsin, U.S.	
151	Win	109–25–14 (3)	Tait Littman	KO	1 (10)	Jan 1, 1936	Auditorium, Milwaukee, Wisconsin, U.S.	
150	Loss	108–25–14 (3)	Freddie Steele	UD	10	Sep 17, 1935	Civic Ice Arena, Seattle, Washington, U.S.	
149	Loss	108–24–14 (3)	Oscar Rankins	PTS	10	Aug 21, 1934	Olympic Auditorium, Los Angeles, California, U.S.	
148	Loss	108–23–14 (3)	Emilio Martinez	PTS	10	Jun 18, 1934	Denver, Colorado, U.S.	
147	Draw	108–22–14 (3)	Freddie Steele	PTS	10	May 22, 1934	Civic Ice Arena, Seattle, Washington, U.S.	
146	Loss	108–22–13 (3)	Frank R. Weimer	PTS	10	Feb 23, 1934	Coliseum, San Diego, California, U.S.	
145	Win	108–21–13 (3)	Tony Poloni	PTS	10	Jan 16, 1934	Olympic Auditorium, Los Angeles, California, U.S.	
144	Win	107–21–13 (3)	Frankie Remus	KO	6 (10)	Dec 5, 1933	Crystal Pool, Seattle, Washington, U.S.	
143	Win	106–21–13 (3)	Eddie Murdock	TKO	10 (10)	Oct 27, 1933	Coliseum, San Diego, California, U.S.	
142	Win	105–21–13 (3)	Lou Bertman	KO	2 (10)	Oct 12, 1933	Madison Square Garden, Phoenix, Arizona, U.S.	
141	Win	104–21–13 (3)	Mike Payan	PTS	10	Oct 6, 1933	Coliseum, San Diego, California, U.S.	
140	Win	103–21–13 (3)	Billy Papke Jr	KO	8 (10)	Sep 21, 1933	Pasadena Arena, Pasadena, California, U.S.	
139	Win	102–21–13 (3)	Johnny Romero	KO	3 (10)	Sep 15, 1933	Coliseum, San Diego, California, U.S.	
138	Win	101–21–13 (3)	Manuel Victoria	TKO	7 (15)	Sep 3, 1933	Foreign Club Arena, Tijuana, Baja California, Mexico	
137	Draw	100–21–13 (3)	Hal Hoxwood	PTS	10	Aug 25, 1933	McCullough's Arena, Salt Lake City, Utah, U.S.	
136	Draw	100–21–12 (3)	Vearl Whitehead	PTS	10	Aug 8, 1933	Olympic Auditorium, Los Angeles, California, U.S.	
135	Loss	100–21–11 (3)	Vearl Whitehead	DQ	10 (10)	Jul 28, 1933	Dreamland Auditorium, San Francisco, California, U.S.	
134	Win	100–20–11 (3)	Wesley Ketchell	PTS	10	Jul 18, 1933	Olympic Auditorium, Los Angeles, California, U.S.	
133	Win	99–20–11 (3)	Babe Marino	KO	10 (10)	Jun 30, 1933	Dreamland Auditorium, San Francisco, California, U.S.	
132	NC	98–20–11 (3)	Ben Jeby	NC	6 (12)	Apr 19, 1933	Public Hall, Cleveland, Ohio, U.S.	The Cleveland Boxing Commissioners ordered Block to halt the fight due to the lack of effort from both fighters
131	Win	98–20–11 (2)	Willie Oster	KO	3 (10)	Feb 28, 1933	Convention Hall, Toledo, Ohio, U.S.	
130	Win	97–20–11 (2)	Rosy Baker	PTS	10	Feb 21, 1933	Tomlinson Hall, Indianapolis, Indiana, U.S.	
129	Win	96–20–11 (2)	Sammy Slaughter	KO	7 (12)	Jan 30, 1933	Public Hall, Cleveland, Ohio, U.S.	Won vacant American middleweight title
128	Win	95–20–11 (2)	Young Stuhley	KO	4 (10)	Jan 13, 1933	Clinton, Iowa, U.S.	
127	Draw	94–20–11 (2)	Tommy Freeman	PTS	10	Dec 26, 1932	Motor Square Garden, Pittsburgh, Pennsylvania, U.S.	
126	Win	94–20–10 (2)	Willie Oster	NWS	10	Dec 1, 1932	Coliseum, Davenport, Iowa, U.S.	
125	Win	93–20–10 (2)	Jackie Purvis	KO	3 (10)	Nov 24, 1932	Armory, Akron, Ohio, U.S.	
124	Win	92–20–10 (2)	Johnny Peppe	PTS	8	Oct 3, 1932	Convention Hall, Atlantic City, New Jersey, U.S.	
123	Win	91–20–10 (2)	Kid Leonard	NWS	10	Aug 29, 1932	Palmer School Arena, Davenport, Iowa, U.S.	
122	Win	90–20–10 (2)	Jack December	KO	2 (6)	Aug 9, 1932	Public Hall, Cleveland, Ohio, U.S.	
121	Loss	89–20–10 (2)	Marcel Thil	DQ	11 (15)	Jun 11, 1932	Parc des Princes, Paris, Paris, France	Lost NBA middleweight title; For vacant IBU and The Ring middleweight titles
120	Win	89–19–10 (2)	Young Terry	PTS	12	Apr 26, 1932	Armory, Trenton, New Jersey, U.S.	Retained NBA middleweight title
119	Win	88–19–10 (2)	Bud Saltis	PTS	10	Apr 7, 1932	Columbus Community Club, Green Bay, Wisconsin, U.S.	
118	Win	87–19–10 (2)	Chuck Burns	KO	3 (10)	Mar 31, 1932	Armory, Akron, Ohio, U.S.	
117	Loss	86–19–10 (2)	Frankie O'Brien	DQ	8 (10)	Mar 14, 1932	Valley Arena, Holyoke, Massachusetts, U.S.	
116	Win	86–18–10 (2)	Oddone Piazza	TKO	6 (10)	Jan 25, 1932	Auditorium, Milwaukee, Wisconsin, U.S.	Won vacant NBA middleweight title
115	Win	85–18–10 (2)	Henry Firpo	SD	10	Dec 11, 1931	Auditorium, Milwaukee, Wisconsin, U.S.	
114	Win	84–18–10 (2)	Frankie O'Brien	PTS	10	Nov 19, 1931	Auditorium, Milwaukee, Wisconsin, U.S.	
113	Win	83–18–10 (2)	George Nichols	PTS	10	Nov 3, 1931	Auditorium, Milwaukee, Wisconsin, U.S.	
112	Win	82–18–10 (2)	Johnny Roberts	KO	3 (10)	Oct 21, 1931	Armory, Akron, Ohio, U.S.	
111	Win	81–18–10 (2)	Clyde Chastain	TKO	6 (10)	Sep 17, 1931	Auditorium, Milwaukee, Wisconsin, U.S.	
110	Win	80–18–10 (2)	Tiger Thomas	PTS	10	Aug 25, 1931	Borchert Field, Milwaukee, Wisconsin, U.S.	
109	Loss	79–18–10 (2)	Thomas Lawless	PTS	10	May 25, 1931	Chicago Stadium, Chicago, Illinois, U.S.	
108	Win	79–17–10 (2)	Ham Jenkins	NWS	10	Apr 28, 1931	Kansas City, Missouri, U.S.	
107	Win	78–17–10 (2)	Paul Pirrone	PTS	10	Apr 14, 1931	Public Hall, Cleveland, Ohio, U.S.	
106	Win	77–17–10 (2)	Buddy Gorman	PTS	10	Mar 11, 1931	Auditorium, Oakland, California, U.S.	
105	Win	76–17–10 (2)	Herman Ratzlaff	UD	10	Feb 17, 1931	Auditorium, Portland, Oregon, U.S.	
104	Win	75–17–10 (2)	Frank Rowsey	TKO	8 (10)	Feb 6, 1931	Dreamland Auditorium, San Francisco, California, U.S.	
103	Win	74–17–10 (2)	Mike Hector	PTS	10	Jan 30, 1931	Stockton, California, U.S.	
102	Draw	73–17–10 (2)	Chick Devlin	PTS	10	Jan 23, 1931	Dreamland Auditorium, San Francisco, California, U.S.	
101	Win	73–17–9 (2)	Young Johnny Burns	TKO	7 (10)	Jan 13, 1931	Auditorium, Oakland, California, U.S.	
100	Win	72–17–9 (2)	Clyde Chastain	KO	4 (10)	Dec 26, 1930	Armory, Akron, Ohio, U.S.	
99	Loss	71–17–9 (2)	Jackie Brady	PTS	10	Nov 28, 1930	Carney Auditorium, Erie, Pennsylvania, U.S.	
98	Win	71–16–9 (2)	Meyer Lichtenstein	SD	10	Nov 10, 1930	Convention Hall, Rochester, New York, U.S.	
97	Loss	70–16–9 (2)	Harry Smith	PTS	10	Oct 23, 1930	Olympia Boxing Club, Manhattan, New York City, New York, U.S.	
96	Win	70–15–9 (2)	Cowboy Jack Willis	NWS	10	Sep 15, 1930	Canton Auditorium, Canton, Ohio, U.S.	
95	NC	69–15–9 (2)	Harry Smith	NC	9 (12)	Sep 4, 1930	Queensboro Stadium, Long Island City, Queens, New York City, New York, U.S.	Billed for the colored middleweight championship of the world
94	Win	69–15–9 (1)	Ham Jenkins	PTS	10	Aug 15, 1930	Denver, Colorado, U.S.	
93	Draw	68–15–9 (1)	Manuel Quintero	PTS	10	Aug 8, 1930	Dreamland Auditorium, San Francisco, California, U.S.	
92	Win	68–15–8 (1)	Thomas Lawless	KO	9 (10)	Jul 18, 1930	Dreamland Auditorium, San Francisco, California, U.S.	
91	Win	67–15–8 (1)	Vincent Forgione	PTS	10	Jun 25, 1930	Taylor Bowl, Newburgh Heights, Ohio, U.S.	
90	Win	66–15–8 (1)	Henry Goldberg	PTS	10	Jun 2, 1930	Heywood Arena, West Springfield, Massachusetts, U.S.	
89	Win	65–15–8 (1)	Vincent Forgione	PTS	10	May 26, 1930	Meyers Bowl, North Braddock, Pennsylvania, U.S.	
88	Loss	64–15–8 (1)	Thomas Lawless	PTS	10	May 12, 1930	Valley Arena, Holyoke, Massachusetts, U.S.	
87	Loss	64–14–8 (1)	Tiger Roy Williams	PTS	12	Apr 22, 1930	Memorial Hall, Dayton, Ohio, U.S.	
86	Win	64–13–8 (1)	Gene Cardi	TKO	7 (10)	Apr 14, 1930	Wheeling, West Virginia, U.S.	
85	Win	63–13–8 (1)	Jock Malone	NWS	10	Mar 17, 1930	Saint Paul, Minnesota, U.S.	
84	Win	62–13–8 (1)	Meyer Grace	TKO	3 (10)	Mar 14, 1930	Armory, Akron, Ohio, U.S.	
83	Win	61–13–8 (1)	Wesley Ketchell	PTS	10	Feb 14, 1930	Dreamland Auditorium, San Francisco, California, U.S.	
82	Draw	60–13–8 (1)	Eddie Roberts	PTS	10	Feb 7, 1930	Dreamland Auditorium, San Francisco, California, U.S.	
81	Win	60–13–7 (1)	Izzy Grove	KO	7 (10)	Jan 27, 1930	St. Nicholas Arena, Manhattan, New York City, New York, U.S.	
80	Win	59–13–7 (1)	Floyd Hybert	TKO	3 (10)	Jan 17, 1930	Valley Arena, Holyoke, Massachusetts, U.S.	
79	Win	58–13–7 (1)	Billy Angelo	PTS	10	Jan 1, 1930	Arena, Philadelphia, Pennsylvania, U.S.	
78	NC	57–13–7 (1)	Jackie Fields	NC	7 (10)	Dec 13, 1929	Boston Garden, Boston, Massachusetts, U.S.	
77	Win	57–13–7	Nick Testo	KO	6 (10)	Dec 4, 1929	Armory, Akron, Ohio, U.S.	
76	Loss	56–13–7	Jackie Fields	PTS	10	Oct 21, 1929	State Armory, San Francisco, California, U.S.	
75	Win	56–12–7	Jackie Horner	KO	2 (10)	Oct 9, 1929	Armory, Akron, Ohio, U.S.	
74	Win	55–12–7	Fred Mahan	KO	6 (10)	Aug 20, 1929	Olympic Auditorium, Los Angeles, California, U.S.	
73	Win	54–12–7	Pete Meyers	TKO	5 (10)	Aug 12, 1929	State Armory, San Francisco, California, U.S.	
72	Win	53–12–7	Jack Lewis	KO	3 (8)	Jul 29, 1929	Memphis, Tennessee, U.S.	
71	Loss	52–12–7	Thomas Lawless	PTS	12	Jul 16, 1929	Taylor Bowl, Newburgh Heights, Ohio, U.S.	
70	Win	52–11–7	Jack McVey	PTS	10	Jun 25, 1929	Braves Field, Boston, Massachusetts, U.S.	
69	Win	51–11–7	Al Mello	TKO	6 (10)	Jun 3, 1929	Boston Garden, Boston, Massachusetts, U.S.	
68	Win	50–11–7	Izzy Grove	TKO	6 (10)	May 17, 1929	Madison Square Garden, Manhattan, New York City, New York, U.S.	
67	Win	49–11–7	Al Mello	PTS	10	May 3, 1929	Madison Square Garden, Manhattan, New York City, New York, U.S.	
66	Draw	48–11–7	Tommy Freeman	PTS	12	Apr 9, 1929	Public Hall, Cleveland, Ohio, U.S.	
65	Win	48–11–6	George Fifield	KO	1 (?)	Apr 2, 1929	Armory, Akron, Ohio, U.S.	
64	Win	47–11–6	Joe Zelinski	KO	5 (10)	Mar 11, 1929	Valley Arena, Holyoke, Massachusetts, U.S.	
63	Loss	46–11–6	Nick Testo	DQ	5 (10)	Feb 25, 1929	Valley Arena, Holyoke, Massachusetts, U.S.	
62	Loss	46–10–6	Thomas Lawless	PTS	10	Feb 18, 1929	Broadway Auditorium, Buffalo, U.S.	
61	Win	46–9–6	Jack Murphy	KO	4 (6)	Feb 15, 1929	Carney Auditorium, Erie, Pennsylvania, U.S.	
60	Win	45–9–6	Arthur Schaekels	PTS	10	Jan 14, 1929	Broadway Auditorium, Buffalo, New York, U.S.	
59	Win	44–9–6	Arthur Schaekels	KO	1 (10)	Jan 8, 1929	Public Hall, Cleveland, Ohio, U.S.	
58	Draw	43–9–6	Tony Vaccarelli	PTS	10	Dec 28, 1928	Madison Square Garden, Manhattan, New York City, New York, U.S.	
57	Win	43–9–5	Pal Silvers	PTS	8	Nov 16, 1928	Madison Square Garden, Manhattan, New York City, New York, U.S.	
56	Win	42–9–5	Jimmy Finley	NWS	10	Nov 2, 1928	Armory, Akron, Ohio, U.S.	
55	Win	41–9–5	Thomas Lawless	PTS	10	Oct 19, 1928	Erie, Pennsylvania, U.S.	
54	Win	40–9–5	Billy Leonard	KO	1 (10)	Oct 5, 1928	Armory, Akron, Ohio, U.S.	
53	Win	39–9–5	Heavy Andrews	PTS	10	Sep 28, 1928	Erie, Pennsylvania, U.S.	
52	Win	38–9–5	Bobby LaSalle	SD	10	Sep 18, 1928	Taylor Bowl, Newburgh Heights, Ohio, U.S.	
51	Win	37–9–5	Tommy Freeman	SD	10	Aug 15, 1928	Taylor Bowl, Newburgh Heights, Ohio, U.S.	
50	Loss	36–9–5	Sergeant Sammy Baker	UD	10	Jul 17, 1928	Olympic Arena, Brooklyn, New York City, New York, U.S.	
49	Win	36–8–5	Billy Alger	NWS	10	Jun 25, 1928	Armory, Akron, U.S.	
48	Win	35–8–5	Lowell Bobby Brown	TKO	2 (10)	Jun 13, 1928	Olympic Arena, Brooklyn, New York City, New York, U.S.	
47	Win	34–8–5	Ben Spivey	TKO	6 (10)	May 28, 1928	Company A Armory, Marietta, Ohio, U.S.	
46	Loss	33–8–5	Lowell Bobby Brown	PTS	8	May 14, 1928	Public Hall, Cleveland, Ohio, U.S.	
45	Win	33–7–5	Mickey Fedor	TKO	7 (8)	May 7, 1928	Armory, Akron, Ohio, U.S.	
44	Win	32–7–5	Harry Williams	TKO	4 (6)	Apr 26, 1928	Armory, Akron, Ohio, U.S.	
43	Win	31–7–5	Buck McMillan	TKO	3 (8)	Apr 12, 1928	Canton, Ohio, U.S.	
42	Win	30–7–5	Ben Spivey	KO	4 (?)	Apr 9, 1928	Marietta, Ohio, U.S.	
41	Win	29–7–5	Joe Feldman	KO	1 (6)	Mar 19, 1928	Public Hall, Cleveland, Ohio, U.S.	
40	Win	28–7–5	Allen Beatty	NWS	6	Mar 16, 1928	Armory, Akron, Ohio, U.S.	
39	Win	27–7–5	Sailor Dan Maxwell	KO	4 (?)	Mar 1, 1928	Canton, Ohio, U.S.	
38	Win	26–7–5	Hank Graham	KO	1 (6)	Feb 29, 1928	Armory, Akron, Ohio, U.S.	
37	Win	25–7–5	Black Fitzsimmons	KO	3 (?)	Feb 23, 1928	Barberton, Ohio, U.S.	
36	Win	24–7–5	Al Jackson	PTS	6	Feb 13, 1928	Public Hall, Cleveland, Ohio, U.S.	
35	Loss	23–7–5	Young Saylor	NWS	12	Jan 26, 1928	Auditorium, Marietta, Ohio, U.S.	
34	Win	23–6–5	Arvin Spence	TKO	2 (4)	Jan 17, 1928	Public Hall, Cleveland, Ohio, U.S.	
33	Win	22–6–5	George Moore	KO	5 (?)	Jan 2, 1928	Akron, Ohio, U.S.	
32	Win	21–6–5	Paul Wanzo	KO	3 (3)	Dec 27, 1927	Marietta, Ohio, U.S.	
31	Win	20–6–5	Polish Wonder	TKO	3 (3)	Dec 27, 1927	Marietta, Ohio, U.S.	
30	Win	19–6–5	Jeff Baulknight	PTS	6	Dec 7, 1927	Public Hall, Cleveland, Ohio, U.S.	
29	Win	18–6–5	Gunner Johnson	NWS	6	Sep 19, 1927	Armory, Akron, Ohio, U.S.	
28	Win	17–6–5	Marvin Morrison	NWS	10	May 26, 1927	Armory, Akron, Ohio, U.S.	
27	Win	16–6–5	Marvin Morrison	NWS	10	May 3, 1927	Armory, Akron, Ohio, U.S.	
26	Win	15–6–5	Sam Bruce	PTS	8	Apr 7, 1927	Memphis Stadium, Memphis, Tennessee, U.S.	
25	Win	14–6–5	Cyclone Williams	PTS	8	Jan 31, 1927	Memphis Stadium, Memphis, Tennessee, U.S.	
24	Win	13–6–5	Kid Roux	PTS	8	Dec 13, 1926	Memphis Stadium, Memphis, Tennessee, U.S.	
23	Win	12–6–5	Cyclone Williams	PTS	8	Nov 28, 1926	Memphis Stadium, Memphis, Tennessee, U.S.	
22	Win	11–6–5	Kid Roux	NWS	8	Oct 22, 1926	Greenville Stadium, Greenville, Mississippi, U.S.	
21	Win	10–6–5	Cyclone Williams	KO	4 (8)	Oct 4, 1926	Memphis Stadium, Memphis, Tennessee, U.S.	
20	Win	9–6–5	Young Sharkey	TKO	7 (8)	Sep 17, 1926	Greenville Stadium, Greenville, Mississippi, U.S.	
19	Draw	8–6–5	Kid Roux	PTS	8	Jul 26, 1926	Memphis Stadium, Memphis, Tennessee, U.S.	
18	Win	8–6–4	Kid Lucius	TKO	3 (8)	Apr 19, 1926	Memphis Stadium, Memphis, Tennessee, U.S.	
17	Win	7–6–4	Billy Cannon	KO	2 (8)	Feb 1, 1926	Hot Springs, Arkansas, U.S.	
16	Draw	6–6–4	Kid Roux	PTS	8	Jan 11, 1926	Southern A.C., Memphis, Tennessee, U.S.	
15	Win	6–6–3	Kid Bruce	PTS	8	Nov 16, 1925	Southern A.C., Memphis, Tennessee, U.S.	
14	Loss	5–6–3	Harry Bettin	PTS	8	Nov 10, 1925	Memphis Stadium, Memphis, Tennessee, U.S.	
13	Loss	5–5–3	Kid Sharkey	DQ	3 (8)	Nov 3, 1925	Memphis, Tennessee, U.S.	
12	Draw	5–4–3	Kid Roux	PTS	8	Jul 13, 1925	Southern A.C., Memphis, Tennessee, U.S.	
11	Draw	5–4–2	Kid Bruce	PTS	8	May 18, 1925	Southern A.C., Memphis, Tennessee, U.S.	
10	Win	5–4–1	George Dixon	TKO	6 (8)	May 4, 1925	Southern A.C., Memphis, Tennessee, U.S.	
9	Win	4–4–1	Joe Walcott	KO	1 (8)	Apr 6, 1925	Southern A.C., Memphis, Tennessee, U.S.	
8	Loss	3–4–1	Clyde Edmundsen	NWS	10	Mar 16, 1925	Hot Springs, Arkansas, U.S.	
7	Win	3–3–1	George Dixon	KO	2 (8)	Feb 9, 1925	Southern A.C., Memphis, Tennessee, U.S.	
6	Loss	2–3–1	Sam Bruce	PTS	8	Dec 1, 1924	Southern A.C., Memphis, Tennessee, U.S.	
5	Win	2–2–1	Fast Black	KO	3 (6)	Nov 10, 1924	Southern A.C., Memphis, Tennessee, U.S.	
4	Loss	1–2–1	George Dixon	DQ	3 (8)	Nov 3, 1924	Southern A.C., Memphis, Tennessee, U.S.	
3	Win	1–1–1	Fast Black	PTS	8	Sep 22, 1924	Southern A.C., Memphis, Tennessee, U.S.	
2	Draw	0–1–1	Kid Bruce	PTS	8	Sep 15, 1924	Southern A.C., Memphis, Tennessee, U.S.	
1	Loss	0–1	Sam Bruce	PTS	8	Aug 11, 1924	Southern A.C., Memphis, Tennessee, U.S.	

Achievements
Preceded by Mickey Walker, vacated	NBA World Middleweight Champion; January 25, 1932 – June 11, 1932	Succeeded by Marcel Thil
