= Vic-sous-Thil =

- Commune
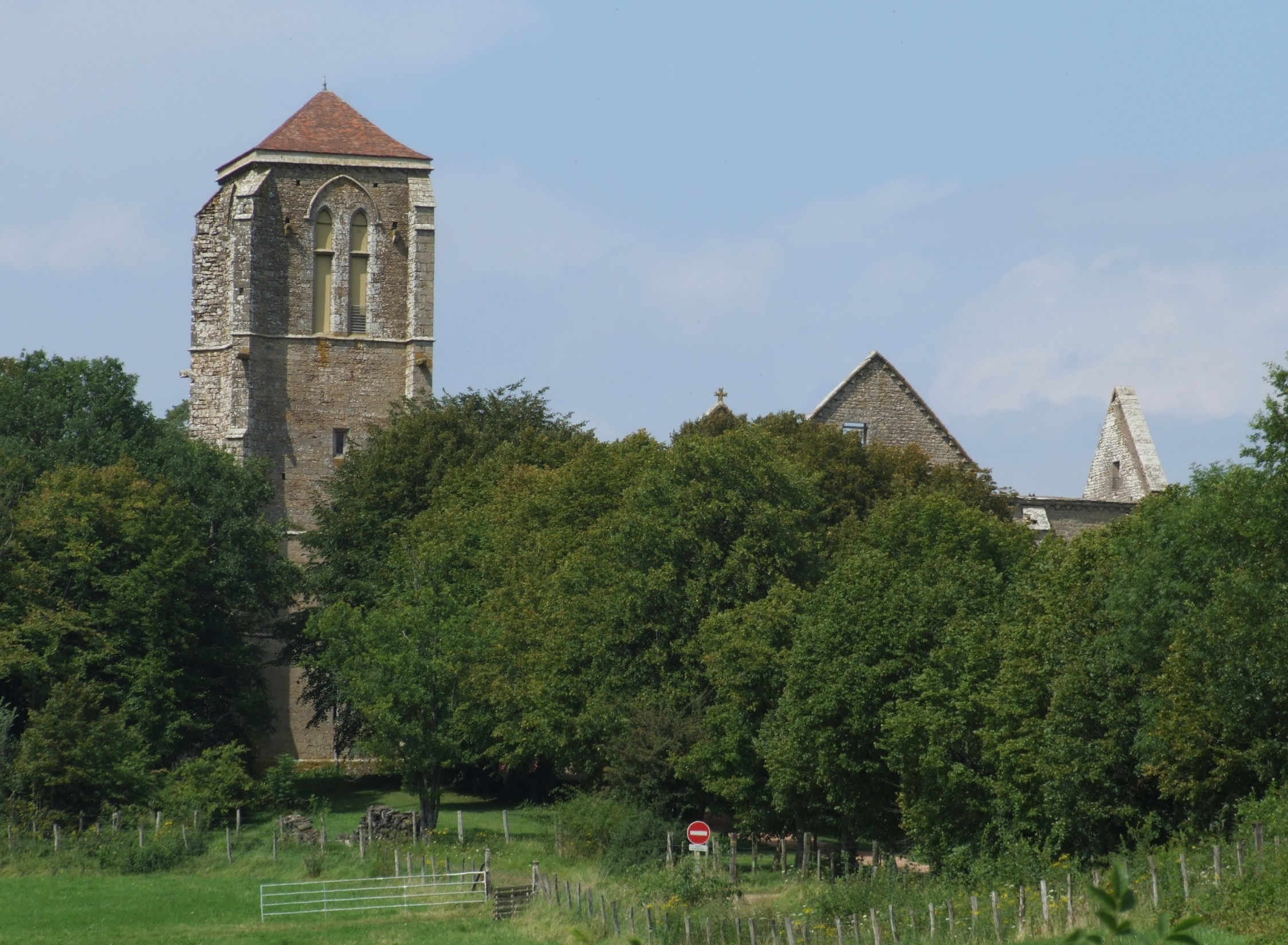
- The church in Vic-sous-Thil
- Location of Vic-sous-Thil
- Location within France Location within Bourgogne-Franche-Comté
- Coordinates: 47°22′15″N 4°18′37″E
- Country: France
- Region: Bourgogne-Franche-Comté
- Department: Côte-d'Or
- Arrondissement: Montbard
- Canton: Semur-en-Auxois

Government
  - Mayor (2020–2026): Pascal Lachaume
- Area^{1}: 21.34 km^{2} (8.24 sq mi)
- Highest elevation: 493 m (1,617 ft)
- Lowest elevation: 318 m (1,043 ft)
- Population (2023): 188
  - Density: 8.81/km^{2} (22.8/sq mi)
- Time zone: UTC+01:00 (CET)
  - Summer (DST): UTC+02:00 (CEST)
- INSEE/Postal code: 21678 /21390
- ^{1} French Land Register data, which excludes lakes, ponds, glaciers > 1 km^{2} (0.386 sq mi or 247 acres) and river estuaries.

Vic-sous-Thil (French pronunciation: [vik su til], literally Vic under Thil) is a commune in the Côte-d'Or département in eastern France.

== Population ==
Historical population
Year	Pop.	±% p.a.
1968	233	—
1975	203	−1.95%
1982	208	+0.35%
1990	209	+0.06%
1999	203	−0.32%
2007	205	+0.12%
2012	198	−0.69%
2017	189	−0.93%
2023	188	−0.09%
Source: INSEE

== Sights ==
- Château de Thil, ruined mediaeval castle, listed since 1905 as a historic site by the French Ministry of Culture.

== See also ==
- Communes of the Côte-d'Or department
- Parc naturel régional du Morvan
