= Tilo Gundlack =

German politician (born 1968)

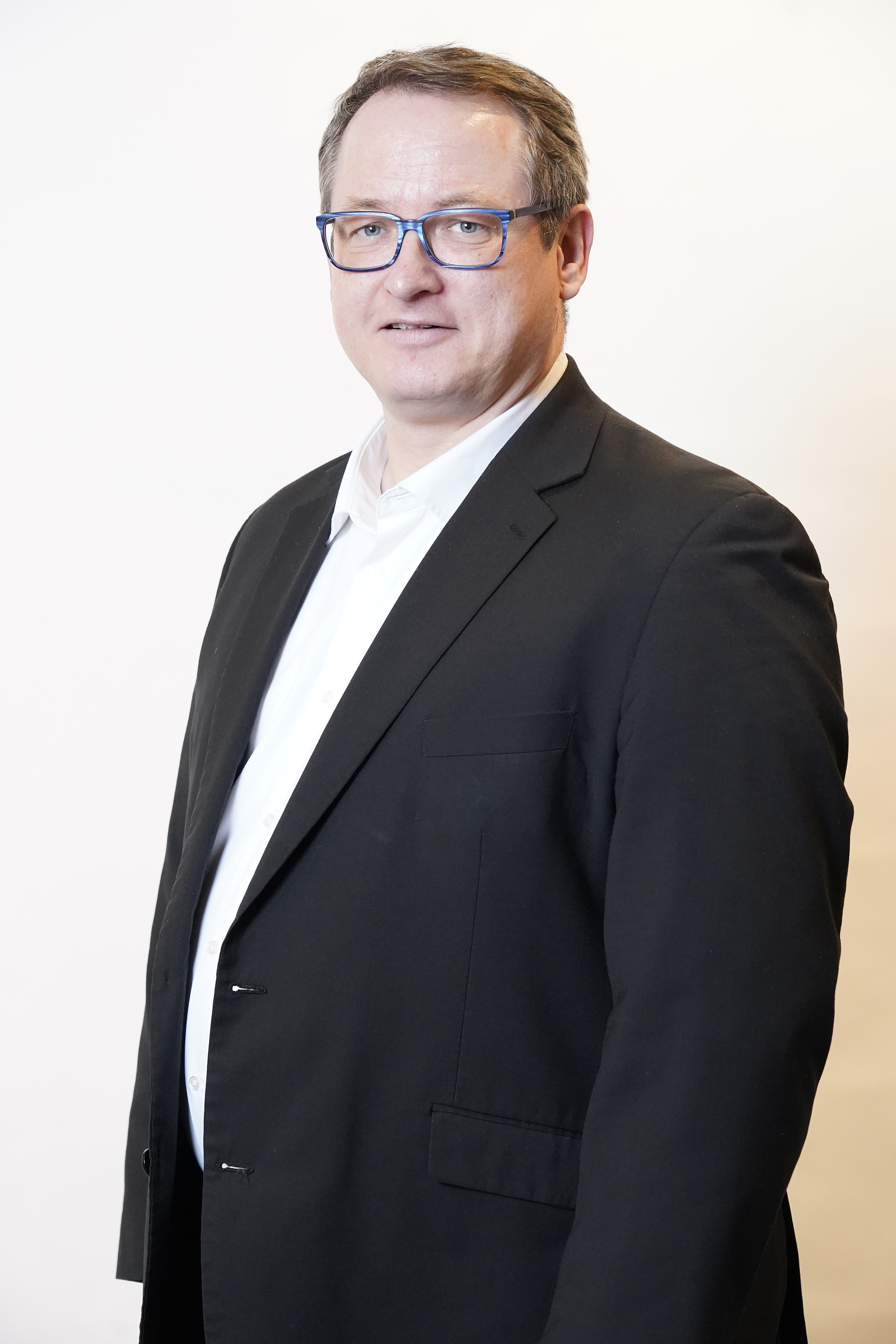
- Gundlack in 2020

Member of the Landtag of Mecklenburg-Vorpommern
- Incumbent
- Assumed office 4 October 2011
- Preceded by: Gerd Zielenkiewitz
- Constituency: Wismar

Personal details
- Born: 19 August 1968 (age 57)
- Party: Social Democratic Party (since 1992)

Tilo Gundlack (born 19 August 1968) is a German politician serving as a member of the Landtag of Mecklenburg-Vorpommern since 2011. From 2014 to 2019, he served as president of the city council of Wismar.
