= Château de Thil =

Ruined mediaeval castle in Burgundy, France

Coordinates: 47°23′06″N 4°20′14″E

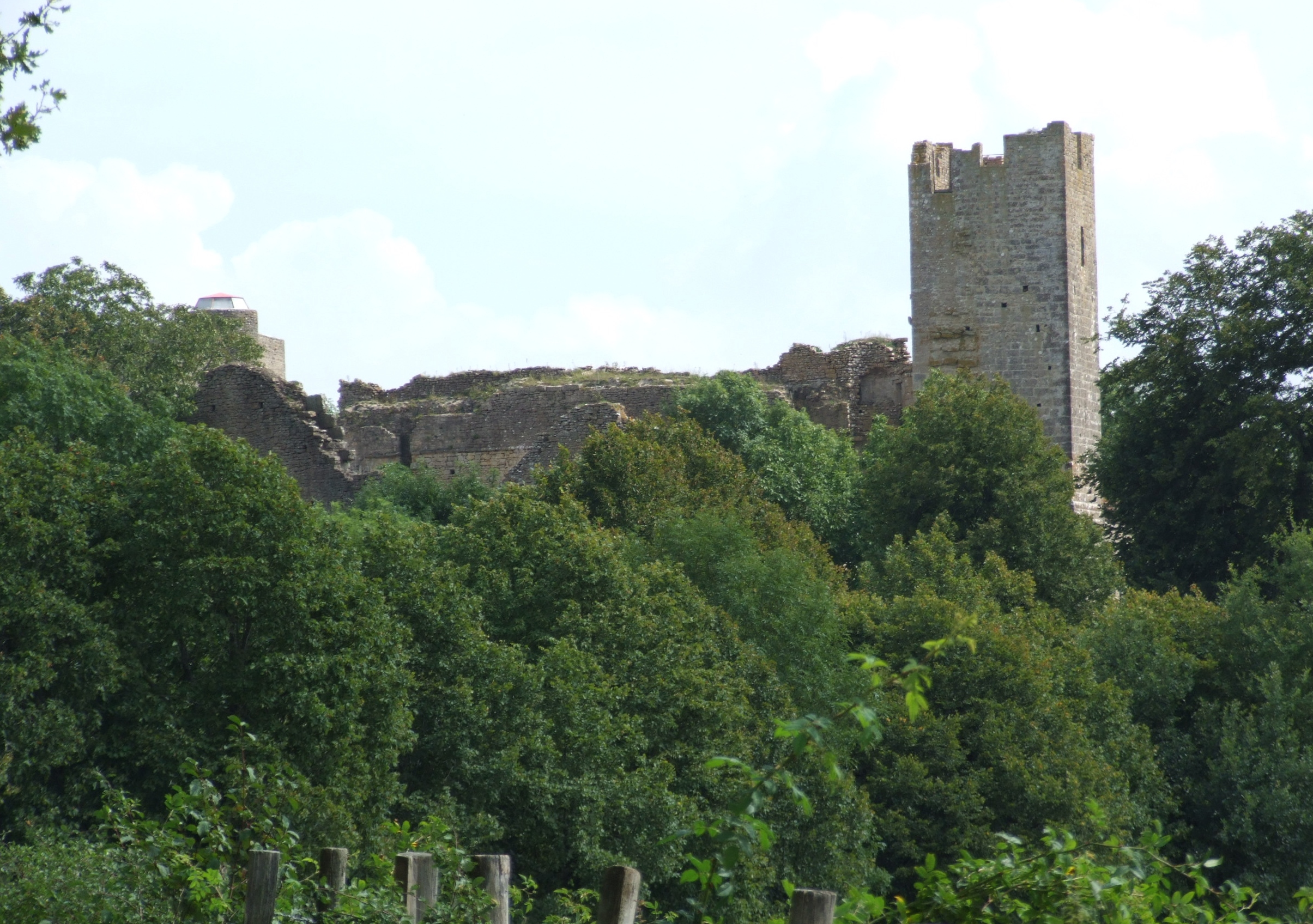

The Château de Thil is a ruined mediaeval castle located to the west of Dijon in Burgundy, in the commune of Vic-sous-Thil in the Côte-d'Or département of France. The presence of a fortress is known since 1016 from a map of Flavigny and the occupation of the site continued until the 17th century. Despite being heavily restored during the 20th century, the remains still permit architectural study.

== Architecture ==
Today, the castle appears as an ovoid enceinte, comprising a reduit and a lower courtyard. Building studies have identified different phases of construction from the 13th to the 16th century.

From the 13th century, ruins include the remains of a residence with a storeroom and, probably, a watch tower. A chapel dates from 1085. At the end of the 14th century, the construction of a residence tower and a habitable building redefined the space creating what is now referred to as the reduit. This configuration was maintained in the 15th and 16th centuries with the construction of a new building and the rebuilding of the enceinte. Over the centuries, the site improved its residential qualities while safeguarding its defensive structures.

The castle knew a long period of occupation, which can be traced over at least six centuries. Its high point is linked to Jean de Thil (end of the 14th century) who equipped the site with its most beautiful architectural elements, notably the collegiate church. The castle's chronology must still be refined, but it is possible to refer to it as a major site for Burgundian castral architecture.

The castle is privately owned. It has been listed since 1905 as a monument historique by the French Ministry of Culture.

== See also ==
- List of castles in France

== Bibliography ==
- Jean Mesqui, Châteaux et enceintes de la France médiévale, De la défense à la résidence, vol 1 Les organes de la défense, 1991 Paris, Picard ISBN 978-2-7084-1741-0
- Jean Mesqui, Châteaux et enceintes de la France médiévale, De la défense à la résidence, vol 2, 1991 Paris, Picard ISBN 978-2-7084-1741-0
- Hervé Mouillebouche, Les maisons fortes en Bourgogne du Nord, du XIIIe au XVIe, 2000 Dijon, Éditions universitaires ISBN 978-2-905965-57-8
- Georges Thiery, Le Château de Thil. Approche archéologique 2003, 2 volumes
