= Marcel Thil =

French boxer

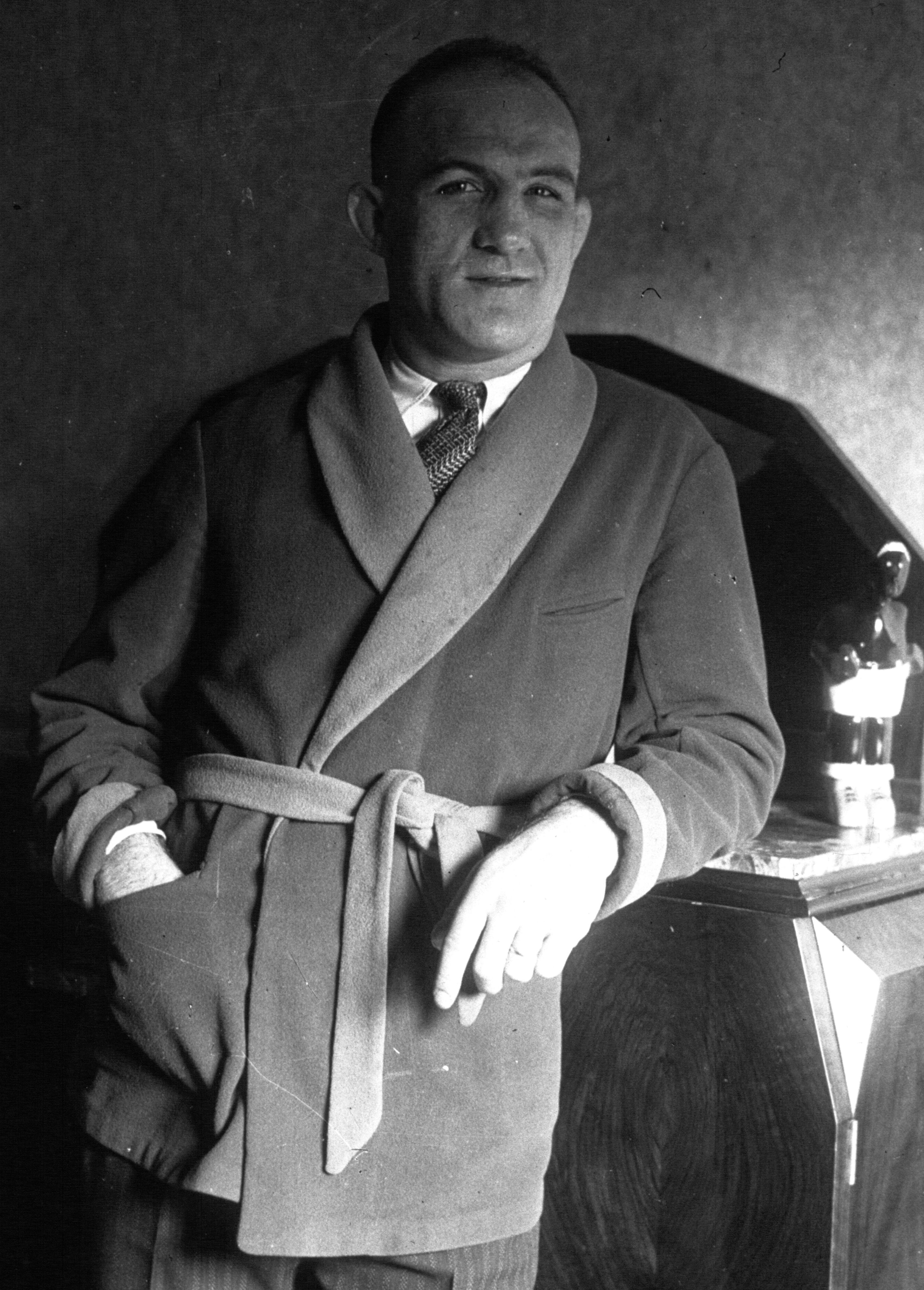

Personal information
- Nationality: French
- Born: Marcel Thil; 29 May 1904 Saint-Dizier, France
- Died: 14 August 1968 (aged 64)
- Weight: Middleweight

Boxing career
- Stance: Orthodox

Boxing record
- Total fights: 136
- Wins: 106
- Win by KO: 49
- Losses: 20
- Draws: 10
- No contests: 0

Marcel Thil (29 May 1904 – 14 August 1968) was a French boxer and middleweight world champion. Statistical boxing website BoxRec rates Thil as the second-best European boxer ever across all weight divisions, after Joe Calzaghe.

== Early life ==
Thil was born in Saint-Dizier, a commune in the Haute-Marne department in north-eastern France. He started boxing at a very young age and turned professional at the age of 16. Thil was a journeyman boxer for a number of years but as he gained experience and matured to his optimal power, he developed strength in both hands and began to win regularly by knockout (KO).

== Career ==
Thil won the French middleweight boxing championship in 1928 and captured the Europe title the following year. After losing his European championship in 1930, Thil won his next 15 fights and then defeated Gorilla Jones by a controversial 11th-round disqualification to capture the National Boxing Association (NBA) world middleweight championship and the vacant International Boxing Union (IBU) world middleweight championship on June 11, 1932, in Paris, France. With his championship victory, Thil became the toast of Paris. He was a major celebrity and a good friend of the celebrated actor Jean Gabin.

Thil successfully defended the title on July 4, 1932, with a 15-round unanimous decision against Len Harvey, but then went more than a year without a title defense. Thil was stripped by the NBA for failing to make a title defense by August 15, 1933, but he remained the IBU champion.

On May 22, 1933, Thil won against German Jewish refugee Eric Seelig, former holder of the German middleweight and light heavyweight championships, at the Palais de Sports in Paris, in a twelve-round points decision. By a few accounts, the bout was for the world title, but the boxers were overweight according to Le Petit Parisien. On January 29, 1934, Seelig fought Marcel Thil again in Paris, losing in a twelve-round points decision.

In addition to defending the IBU middleweight championship, Thil moved up a weight class to win the European light-heavyweight title in 1934. He would successfully defend the title once.

After successfully defending the IBU and Ring Magazine middleweight titles 11 times, Thil fought Fred Apostoli in a non-title bout on September 23, 1937, in New York City. It was a non-title affair because the New York State Athletic Commission, which recognized Freddie Steele as the world middleweight champion, said they would sanction the fight only if Thil agreed not to put his championship on the line. Apostoli won by a 10th-round technical knockout (TKO). The fight was stopped due to a severe cut over the right eye of Thil, who was ahead on points at the time of the stoppage. Shortly after the loss, the 33-year-old Thil retired from boxing vacating his titles.

== Later life and death ==
Thil remained active in the world of boxing as an adviser and cornerman and was named honorary president of the Dieppe Boxing Club. He made a living with a company in Reims until he retired to a home in Cannes on the French Riviera.

Thil died at his home in Cannes on August 14, 1968, at the age of 64. Over the last couple years of his life, he was involved in two car accidents, from which he never fully recovered. Thil is buried in the Grand Jas Cemetery.

== Honors ==
Marcel Thil was posthumously inducted into the International Boxing Hall of Fame at Canastota, New York in 2005. In France, a street was named in his honor in his birthplace of Saint-Dizier, and both a street and a sports stadium carry his name in the city of Reims.

== Professional boxing record ==
136 fights	106 wins	20 losses
By knockout	49	3
By decision	52	17
By disqualification	5	0
Draws	10	

No.	Result	Record	Opponent	Type	Round	Date	Location	Notes
136	Loss	106–20–10	Fred Apostoli	TKO	10 (15)	Sep 23, 1937	Polo Grounds, New York City, New York, U.S.	Lost IBU middleweight title
135	Win	106–19–10	Lou Brouillard	DQ	6 (15)	Feb 15, 1937	Palais des Sports, Paris, Paris, France	Retained IBU middleweight title
134	Win	105–19–10	Lou Brouillard	DQ	4 (15)	Jan 20, 1936	Palais des Sports, Paris, Paris, France	Retained IBU and The Ring middleweight titles
133	Win	104–19–10	Lou Brouillard	UD	12	Nov 25, 1935	Palais des Sports, Paris, Paris, France	
132	Win	103–19–10	Al Diamond	PTS	10	Oct 28, 1935	Velodrome d'Hiver, Paris, Paris, France	
131	Win	102–19–10	Kid Tunero	UD	15	Jul 13, 1935	Arènes du Rond-Point du Prado, Marseille, Bouches-du-Rhône, France	Retained IBU and The Ring middleweight titles
130	Win	101–19–10	Carmelo Candel	UD	15	Jun 28, 1935	Stade Roland Garros, Paris, Paris, France	Retained IBU and The Ring middleweight titles
129	Win	100–19–10	Ignacio Ara	UD	15	Jun 1, 1935	Plaza de Toros de Las Ventas, Madrid, Comunidad de Madrid, Spain	Retained IBU and The Ring middleweight titles
128	Win	99–19–10	Vilda Jaks	TKO	14 (15)	May 4, 1935	Palais des Sports, Paris, Paris, France	Retained IBU and The Ring middleweight titles
127	Win	98–19–10	Jock McAvoy	UD	15	Jan 14, 1935	Palais des Sports, Paris, Paris, France	
126	Win	97–19–10	Tino Rolando	PTS	10	Nov 12, 1934	Palais des Sports, Paris, Paris, France	
125	Draw	96–19–10	Carmelo Candel	PTS	15	Oct 15, 1934	Palais des Sports, Paris, Paris, France	Retained IBU and The Ring middleweight titles
124	Win	96–19–9	Clemente Meroni	PTS	10	Aug 5, 1934	Arènes du Rond-Point du Prado, Marseille, Bouches-du-Rhône, France	
123	Win	95–19–9	Rene De Vos	PTS	10	Jul 15, 1934	Sportpaleis, Antwerpen, Antwerpen, Belgium	
122	Win	94–19–9	Oddone Piazza	PTS	10	Jun 27, 1934	Stade Roland Garros, Paris, Paris, France	
121	Win	93–19–9	Adolf Witt	TKO	8 (15)	Jun 11, 1934	Palais des Sports, Paris, Paris, France	Retained IBU light heavyweight title
120	Win	92–19–9	Gustave Roth	MD	15	May 3, 1934	Palais des Sports, Paris, Paris, France	Retained IBU and The Ring middleweight titles; Retained IBU light heavyweight title
119	Win	91–19–9	Jose Martinez de Alfara	DQ	13 (15)	Mar 26, 1934	Palais des Sports, Paris, Paris, France	Won IBU light heavyweight title
118	Win	90–19–9	Ignacio Ara	UD	15	Feb 26, 1934	Palais des Sports, Paris, Paris, France	Retained IBU and The Ring middleweight titles
117	Win	89–19–9	Eric Seelig	PTS	12	Jan 29, 1934	Palais des Sports, Paris, Paris, France	
116	Win	88–19–9	Kid Tunero	UD	15	Oct 2, 1933	Palais des Sports, Paris, Paris, France	Retained IBU and The Ring middleweight titles
115	Win	87–19–9	Jack Etienne	PTS	10	Sep 15, 1933	Salle Wagram, Paris, Paris, France	
114	Win	86–19–9	Eric Seelig	PTS	12	May 22, 1933	Palais des Sports, Paris, Paris, France	
113	Win	85–19–9	Louis Vauclard	TKO	6 (?)	Mar 8, 1933	Cirque Municipal, Troyes, Aube, France	
112	Win	84–19–9	Jack Etienne	PTS	10	Feb 25, 1933	Palais des Sports, Schaerbeek, Bruxelles-Capitale, Belgium	
111	Loss	83–19–9	Kid Tunero	UD	12	Jan 16, 1933	Palais des Sports, Paris, Paris, France	
110	Win	83–18–9	Charles Van Haecke	KO	2 (10)	Dec 25, 1932	Casino Municipal, Cannes, Alpes-Maritimes, France	
109	Win	82–18–9	Charles Van Haecke	TKO	5 (?)	Dec 9, 1932	Reims, Marne, France	
108	Win	81–18–9	Ignacio Ara	PTS	10	Dec 5, 1932	Palais des Sports, Paris, Paris, France	
107	Win	80–18–9	Len Johnson	RTD	8 (10)	Oct 31, 1932	Palais des Sports, Paris, Paris, France	
106	Win	79–18–9	Len Harvey	PTS	15	Jul 4, 1932	White City Stadium, White City, London, England	Retained NBA, IBU, and The Ring middleweight titles
105	Win	78–18–9	Gorilla Jones	DQ	11 (15)	Jun 11, 1932	Parc des Princes, Paris, Paris, France	Won NBA and vacant The Ring and IBU middleweight titles
104	Win	77–18–9	Jack Hood	TKO	7 (12)	Mar 21, 1932	Palais des Sports, Paris, Paris, France	
103	Win	76–18–9	Jimmy Tarante	UD	10	Feb 22, 1932	Palais des Sports, Paris, Paris, France	
102	Win	75–18–9	Franz Boja	KO	1 (10)	Jan 20, 1932	Salle Wagram, Paris, Paris, France	
101	Win	74–18–9	Amedee Dubus	TKO	4 (10)	Dec 12, 1931	Basel, Switzerland	
100	Win	73–18–9	Pietro Toscani	DQ	3 (10)	Dec 1, 1931	Palais d'Hiver, Lyon, Rhône, France	Toscani was disqualified for abandoning without justification
99	Win	72–18–9	Jack Kid Casey	PTS	10	Nov 9, 1931	Royal Albert Hall, Kensington, London, England	
98	Win	71–18–9	Hermann Klintz	TKO	4 (10)	Oct 26, 1931	Palais des Sports, Paris, Paris, France	
97	Win	70–18–9	Tom Benjamin	KO	8 (10)	Sep 24, 1931	Salle Wagram, Paris, Paris, France	
96	Win	69–18–9	Gheorghe Axioti	PTS	10	Sep 5, 1931	Roman Arenas, Bucharest, Romania	
95	Win	68–18–9	Vince Dundee	UD	12	Jul 10, 1931	Stade Roland Garros, Paris, Paris, France	
94	Win	67–18–9	Felix Sportiello	TKO	8 (10)	Jun 18, 1931	Salle Wagram, Paris, Paris, France	
93	Win	66–18–9	Emile Lebrize	TKO	5 (12)	Apr 15, 1931	Cirque d'Hiver, Paris, Paris, France	Retained France middleweight title
92	Win	65–18–9	Alexis Marin	UD	12	Feb 14, 1931	Casino Municipal, Beausoleil, Alpes-Maritimes, France	Retained France middleweight title
91	Win	64–18–9	Andre Dhainaut	KO	9 (12)	Jan 11, 1931	Hippodrome Lillois, Lille, Nord, France	Retained France middleweight title
90	Win	63–18–9	Pierre Gandon	PTS	12	Dec 10, 1930	Salle Bullier, Paris, Paris, France	Retained France middleweight title
89	Loss	62–18–9	Mario Bosisio	PTS	15	Nov 23, 1930	Palazzo dello Sport (Pad. 3 Fiera), Milan, Lombardia, Italy	Lost IBU middleweight title
88	Win	62–17–9	Motzi Spakow	KO	7 (12)	Nov 1, 1930	Bucharest, Romania	Retained IBU middleweight title
87	Win	61–17–9	Emile Romerio	PTS	10	Sep 6, 1930	Gymnase Huygens, Paris, Paris, France	
86	Win	60–17–9	Ali Sadek	TKO	6 (?)	Jul 27, 1930	Reims, Marne, France	
85	Win	59–17–9	Alfred Pegazzano	PTS	15	Mar 12, 1930	Salle Wagram, Paris, Paris, France	Retained IBU middleweight title
84	Win	58–17–9	Alexis Marin	PTS	12	Jan 29, 1930	Salle Wagram, Paris, Paris, France	
83	Win	57–17–9	Eugene Corsin	TKO	4 (?)	Jan 18, 1930	Amiens, Somme, France	
82	Win	56–17–9	Charles Krauchi	TKO	6 (?)	Dec 27, 1929	Salle Wagram, Paris, Paris, France	
81	Loss	55–17–9	Fred Shaw	PTS	15	Nov 5, 1929	Manchester, Lancashire, England	
80	Win	55–16–9	Alfred Pegazzano	PTS	12	Oct 16, 1929	Salle Wagram, Paris, Paris, France	
79	Win	54–16–9	Alexis Marin	TKO	4 (10)	May 15, 1929	Velodrome d'Hiver, Paris, Paris, France	
78	Win	53–16–9	Leone Jacovacci	PTS	15	Mar 27, 1929	Cirque de Paris, Paris, Paris, France	Won IBU middleweight title
77	Win	52–16–9	Yvan Laffineur	KO	2 (12)	Mar 12, 1929	Cirque de Paris, Paris, Paris, France	Retained France middleweight title
76	Win	51–16–9	Yvan Laffineur	PTS	12	Jan 8, 1929	Cirque de Paris, Paris, Paris, France	Retained France middleweight title
75	Win	50–16–9	Billy Farmer	KO	1 (10)	Dec 5, 1928	Salle Wagram, Paris, Paris, France	
74	Win	49–16–9	Orlando Leopardi	TKO	3 (?)	Nov 17, 1928	Velodrome d'Hiver, Paris, Paris, France	
73	Win	48–16–9	Joe Bloomfield	KO	2 (12)	Nov 2, 1928	Salle Wagram, Paris, Paris, France	
72	Win	47–16–9	Marcel Thuru	TKO	1 (10)	Oct 12, 1928	Salle Wagram, Paris, Paris, France	Won vacant France middleweight title
71	Win	46–16–9	Pierre Gandon	KO	5 (10)	Sep 19, 1928	Salle Wagram, Paris, Paris, France	
70	Win	45–16–9	Ted Moore	TKO	7 (?)	Sep 3, 1928	Alcazar, Edmonton, London, England	
69	Win	44–16–9	Guardsman George West	KO	5 (15)	Jul 23, 1928	Alcazar, Edmonton, London, England	
68	Win	43–16–9	Orlando Leopardi	PTS	12	Jul 9, 1928	Tunis, Tunisia	
67	Win	42–16–9	Laurie Raiteri	TKO	8 (?)	Jun 10, 1928	Alcazar, Edmonton, London, England	
66	Win	41–16–9	Andy Newton	TKO	10 (20)	May 21, 1928	Alcazar, Edmonton, London, England	
65	Win	40–16–9	Daniel Arnaud	KO	2 (?)	Apr 21, 1928	Saint-Etienne, Loire, France	
64	Loss	39–16–9	Len Harvey	PTS	15	Dec 12, 1927	Holland Park Rink, Kensington, London, England	
63	Loss	39–15–9	Jack Hood	PTS	15	Nov 28, 1927	The Ring, Blackfriars Road, Southwark, London, England	
62	Draw	39–14–9	Guardsman George West	PTS	15	Nov 2, 1927	Walham Green Baths, Fulham, London, England	
61	Loss	39–14–8	Leone Jacovacci	KO	10 (?)	Oct 28, 1927	Roma, Lazio, Italy	
60	Loss	39–13–8	Joe Bloomfield	PTS	12	Oct 3, 1927	Mile End Peoples Palace, Mile End, London, England	
59	Win	39–12–8	Bob Youssef	PTS	10	Sep 19, 1927	Palais de la Boxe, Marseille, Bouches-du-Rhône, France	
58	Win	38–12–8	Joe Bloomfield	PTS	15	Aug 29, 1927	London, England	
57	Win	37–12–8	Marcel Forgeon	KO	7 (10)	Jul 28, 1927	Cirque de Paris, Paris, Paris, France	
56	Loss	36–12–8	Billy Farmer	PTS	15	Jun 13, 1927	Alcazar, Edmonton, London, England	
55	Win	36–11–8	Andy Newton	RTD	9 (?)	May 3, 1927	Alcazar, Edmonton, London, England	
54	Draw	35–11–8	Maurice Forgeon	PTS	10	Feb 13, 1927	Central Sporting Club, Paris, Paris, France	
53	Win	35–11–7	Battling Mathar	PTS	10	Feb 5, 1927	Central Sporting Club, Paris, Paris, France	
52	Win	34–11–7	Emile Christy	PTS	10	Jan 25, 1927	Cirque de Paris, Paris, Paris, France	
51	Win	33–11–7	Antonio Gabiola	TKO	9 (10)	Dec 21, 1926	Teatro Circo Barcelonés, Barcelona, Cataluña, Spain	
50	Draw	32–11–7	Guillermo Arnau	PTS	10	Nov 23, 1926	Iris Park, Barcelona, Cataluña, Spain	
49	Loss	32–11–6	Leone Jacovacci	PTS	10	Nov 18, 1926	Salle Printania, Nancy, Meurthe-et-Moselle, France	
48	Loss	32–10–6	Raoul Dumondin	PTS	10	Nov 6, 1926	Central Sporting Club, Paris, Paris, France	
47	Draw	32–9–6	Jean Forr	PTS	10	Oct 23, 1926	Central Sporting Club, Paris, Paris, France	
46	Win	32–9–5	Kid Nomo	PTS	10	Oct 17, 1926	Central Sporting Club, Paris, Paris, France	
45	Win	31–9–5	Young Travet	KO	6 (?)	Aug 22, 1926	Velodrome Jean Bouin, Marseille, Bouches-du-Rhône, France	
44	Loss	30–9–5	Kid Nitram	PTS	10	Aug 8, 1926	Velodrome Jean Bouin, Marseille, Bouches-du-Rhône, France	
43	Loss	30–8–5	Tomas Thomas	PTS	10	Jul 15, 1926	Mundial Sport, Barcelona, Cataluña, Spain	
42	Win	30–7–5	Young Travet	TKO	1 (10)	Jun 6, 1926	Arènes du Rond-Point du Prado, Marseille, Bouches-du-Rhône, France	
41	Win	29–7–5	Louis Citony	PTS	8	Apr 12, 1926	Salle Guilbert, Caen, Calvados, France	
40	Loss	28–7–5	Gaston Lafont	PTS	10	Apr 8, 1926	Cherbourg, Manche, France	
39	Win	28–6–5	Eugene Fleurit	PTS	8	Mar 1, 1926	France	Date & location unknown
38	Draw	27–6–5	Maurice Forgeon	PTS	8	Feb 14, 1926	Gymnase Christmann, Paris, Paris, France	
37	Loss	27–6–4	Gaston Lafont	PTS	10	Feb 12, 1926	Caen, Calvados, France	
36	Win	27–5–4	Maurice Forgeon	PTS	10	Feb 9, 1926	Cherbourg, Manche, France	
35	Draw	26–5–4	Enrico Vittorio	PTS	10	Jan 31, 1926	Le Perreux-sur-Marne, Val-de-Marne, France	
34	Win	26–5–3	Theo Dussart	PTS	10	Jan 9, 1926	Calais, Pas-de-Calais, France	
33	Win	25–5–3	Raymond Klauss	TKO	1 (10)	Nov 6, 1925	Cherbourg, Manche, France	
32	Win	24–5–3	Pierre Lambinet	PTS	10	Oct 20, 1925	Ring Cadet, Paris, France	
31	Win	23–5–3	Jean Andre	TKO	3 (?)	Oct 7, 1925	France	Location unknown
30	Win	22–5–3	Jean Fillion	KO	2 (?)	Aug 31, 1925	France	Date & location unknown
29	Win	21–5–3	Georges Morgan	KO	2 (?)	Aug 1, 1925	France	Date & location unknown
28	Win	20–5–3	Enrico Vittorio	PTS	10	Jul 27, 1925	Bricquebec, Manche, France	
27	Win	19–5–3	Daniel Daney	PTS	8	Jun 1, 1925	Saint-Lô, Manche, France	Date unknown
26	Win	18–5–3	Max Plouvier	KO	3 (?)	May 25, 1925	Cherbourg, Manche, France	
25	Win	17–5–3	Paul Siterre	KO	6 (10)	Apr 26, 1925	Vire, Calvados, France	
24	Loss	16–5–3	Maurice Forgeon	TKO	7 (?)	Apr 8, 1925	Cherbourg, Manche, France	
23	Win	16–4–3	Eugene Fleurit	KO	2 (?)	Feb 10, 1925	Cherbourg, Manche, France	
22	Win	15–4–3	Albert Michaud	KO	3 (?)	Nov 1, 1924	France	Date & location unknown
21	Win	14–4–3	Henri Cre	KO	? (?)	Sep 1, 1924	France	Date & location unknown
20	Loss	13–4–3	Gaston Lafont	PTS	10	Jul 1, 1924	France	Date & location unknown
19	Win	13–3–3	Saint Marcelli	KO	4 (?)	Jun 1, 1924	Cherbourg, Manche, France	Date unknown
18	Win	12–3–3	Saint Marcelli	PTS	6	May 25, 1924	Lorient, Morbihan, France	
17	Win	11–3–3	Henri Benoit	PTS	6	May 24, 1924	Lorient, Morbihan, France	
16	Win	10–3–3	Tabart	PTS	8	Apr 27, 1924	Cherbourg, Manche, France	
15	Win	9–3–3	Chambon	TKO	7 (?)	Apr 1, 1924	Cherbourg, Manche, France	
14	Win	8–3–3	Chambon	PTS	8	Mar 7, 1924	Cherbourg, Manche, France	
13	Win	7–3–3	Feodor Nikolaeff	PTS	8	Feb 15, 1924	Caen, Calvados, France	
12	Draw	6–3–3	Joe Batt	PTS	8	Feb 1, 1924	Cherbourg, Manche, France	
11	Win	6–3–2	Edouard Mauconduit	PTS	8	Dec 24, 1923	Cherbourg, Manche, France	
10	Loss	5–3–2	Eugene Alonzo	PTS	8	Nov 7, 1923	Cherbourg, Manche, France	
9	Loss	5–2–2	Eugene Alonzo	PTS	6	Oct 7, 1923	Cherbourg, Manche, France	
8	Win	5–1–2	Motsch	TKO	3 (6)	Sep 16, 1923	Parc du Casino, Cherbourg, Manche, France	
7	Win	4–1–2	Enrico Vittorio	PTS	6	Jul 15, 1923	Cherbourg, Manche, France	
6	Win	3–1–2	Edouard Mauconduit	TKO	4 (?)	May 1, 1923	Cherbourg, Manche, France	Date unknown
5	Win	2–1–2	Louis Le Bihan	PTS	8	Mar 1, 1923	Lorient, Morbihan, France	Date unknown
4	Loss	1–1–2	Pierre Milesic	PTS	6	Jan 1, 1923	France	Date & location unknown
3	Draw	1–0–2	Pierson	PTS	4	Oct 7, 1922	Reims, Marne, France	
2	Win	1–0–1	Andre Franot	TKO	2 (4)	May 25, 1922	Charleville, Marne, France	
1	Draw	0–0–1	Pierson	PTS	4	May 7, 1922	Reims, Marne, France	

Achievements
Vacant Title last held by Mickey Walker	The Ring Middleweight Champion; June 11, 1932 – September 23, 1937; Retired	Vacant Title next held by Freddie Steele
Preceded by Gorilla Jones	NBA World Middleweight Champion; June 11, 1932– September 19, 1933; Stripped	Vacant Title next held by Vince Dundee
Inaugural Champion	IBU World Middleweight Champion; June 11, 1932 – 23 September 1937; Retired	Succeeded by Fred Apostoli
