= Til =

Til or TIL may refer to:

== People ==
=== Given name ===
- Til Brugman (1888–1958) Dutch author, poet, and linguist
- Til Schweiger (born 1963), German actor and filmmaker
- Til Wykes (born 1953), English psychologist and author

=== Surname ===
- Cornelius Van Til (1895–1987), Dutch-American Christian philosopher
- Guus Til (born 1997), Zambian-born Dutch professional football player
- Sonny Til (1928–1981), American singer, lead singer of The Orioles

== Places ==
- Til, Ardabil, a village in Iran
- Til, East Azerbaijan, a village in Iran
- Tilbury Town railway station (National Rail station code), Essex, England

== Science and technology ==
- Til (plant), a tree
- Transparent intensional logic, a logical system
- Tumor-infiltrating lymphocytes, white blood cells that have migrated towards a tumor
- Threaded interpretive language, a threaded code computing execution model

== Other uses ==
- Theoretical Inquiries in Law, a law journal published by Tel Aviv University
- Til (novel), by José de Alencar
- Tromsø IL, a Norwegian football team
- "TIL", an episode of the Netflix series XO, Kitty

== See also ==
- Thil (disambiguation)
- Till (disambiguation)
- Tilo (disambiguation)
