= Sautter =

Sautter is a surname of German origin. Notable people with the surname include:

- Bill Sautter, American soccer player
- Carl Sautter (1948–1993), British writer
- Christian Sautter (born 1940), French politician
- Guy A. Sautter (1886–1961), Swiss badminton player
- Violaine Sautter, French planetary scientist
