= Until =

Until may refer to

== Music ==
- Until, a 1967 album by Robin Kenyatta
- Until, a 2008 album by One Little Plane
- "Until", a song by Wilfred Sanderson
- A version of the song "Anema e core" with English lyrics
- "Until..." (Sting song), a 2001 song by Sting for the film Kate & Leopold
- "Until", a song by the Bee Gees from the 1979 album Spirits Having Flown

== Other uses ==
- "DO UNTIL", a statement used in control flow construction
- Until, a 2016 installation by artist Nick Cave
