= Tilo, Chad =

Village in Logone Occidental, Chad

Tilo تيلو
- Location in Chad
- Coordinates: 8°40′54″N 16°12′5″E
- Country: Chad
- Region: Logone Occidental
- Department: Lac Wey
- Time zone: UTC+1

Tilo (Arabic: تيلو) is a village in the Logone Occidental region of Chad, of which the capital is Moundou. It is located approximately 19 km east-northeast of Moundou.

The chief headman of the village, Nandji Laokoua, was killed by the Armed Forces for a Federal Republic (FARF) in December 1996.
