= Till (furniture) =

A till is a small compartment, drawer or shelf inside a larger blanket or other form of chest, used to segregate small items.

The use of tills to hold cash, within chests used for storing retail goods, may have been part of the word's evolution to the common term "till" for a cash register.
