= Thilo Sauter =

Thilo Sauter from the Austrian Academy of Sciences, Wiener Neustadt, Austria in 2004 is the director of the Research Unit for Integrated Sensor Systems. In 2014, he is named a Fellow of the Institute of Electrical and Electronics Engineers (IEEE). for contributions to synchronization and security in automation networks.
