= Tommy Freeman (boxer) =

American boxer (1904–1986)

- Freeman in 1920

Personal information
- Nickname: Tommy
- Born: Thomas Jewel Freeman; January 22, 1904 Hot Springs, Arkansas, U.S.
- Died: February 20, 1986 (aged 82) Little Rock, Arkansas, U.S.
- Height: 5 ft 7 1/2 in (171 cm)
- Weight: Welterweight

Boxing career
- Reach: 70 in (178 cm)
- Stance: Orthodox

Boxing record
- Total fights: 224
- Wins: 174
- Win by KO: 84
- Losses: 20
- Draws: 21

Tommy Freeman (January 22, 1904 – February 20, 1986) was an American professional boxer who competed in the 1920s and 1930s. He won the Undisputed Welterweight World Championship on September 5, 1930, when he defeated reigning champion Young Jack Thompson. He lost the title to Thompson the following year, on April 14, 1931. Remarkably, the majority of his recorded wins were by knockout, and his losses were few, at under ten percent of his total fights.

He was rated by The Ring magazine as a top ten welterweight contender from 1926 to 1931. His impressive win and extraordinary knockout record might be explained by the limited quality of competition he faced in his native Hot Springs, Arkansas, where he fought many of his fights.

== Boxing career highlights ==
Freeman's amateur boxing career began around the age of sixteen in Hot Springs, Arkansas. Between 1920 and 1922, he lost only two of twenty of his better publicized local bouts and won six by knockout. He fought most of these bouts in the lightweight to super-lightweight division.

Around 1923, at 19, he began fighting in the Welterweight division, and often out of state in Memphis, Tennessee, and parts of New Orleans. His few losses during this period were often to heavier or more experienced boxers, and included Al Monroe, Dude Martinez, and Frankie Jones. His loss to Jimmy King in January 1923 was a rare TKO, in which Freeman sprained his hip and was very reluctant to have his manager call the fight.

He achieved some early recognition on New Years Day in 1926, when he knocked out Sergeant Sammy Baker in seven rounds at Madison Square Garden.

On October 25, 1926, Freeman fought a well attended match against Jack Zivic of Pittsburgh in Cleveland, Ohio. Both fighters were recognized as leading contenders for the Welterweight title then held by Pete Latzo. The bout was a thrilling spectacle and the substantial crowd of twelve thousand loudly opposed the draw verdict as they favored the local boxer Zivic.

On June 22, 1926, Freeman defeated Pinky Mitchell in Brooklyn, Ohio, in ten rounds by Newspaper Decision of the Associated Press. Mitchell had held the Light Welterweight (Super Lightweight) Championship from 1922 to 1926 when he was defeated by Mushy Callahan. Freeman weighed in over the required weight and the fight, originally scheduled for the Jr. Welterweight title, became a non-title fight.

On August 18, 1927, Freeman beat noted British boxer Harry Mason in a ten-round welterweight bout at Madison Square Garden. Mason had a neat right-hand that countered Freeman, but he could not match him in close quarters. Mason was well known in London where he had taken the British Lightweight Championship, known as the Lonsdale Belt in February 1926. Mason, a Jewish boxer, had been a stablemate of Jewish welterweight champion Jack "Kid" Berg under trainer Alec Goodman.

Freeman defeated Jewish welterweight contender Georgie Levine in a ten-round points decision on October 14, 1929, at Motor Square Garden in Pittsburgh. Now a rising star, Freeman boxed elegantly conserving his energy to last the full ten rounds, and slipped most of the punches of Levine while landing his own with accuracy. He appeared to fight without dealing unnecessary punishment to Levine, whom he easily outpointed.

=== Taking world welterweight championship, September 1930 ===
On September 5, 1930, at Cleveland Ball Park in Cleveland, Ohio, Freeman defeated Young Jack Thompson, the reigning Welterweight Champion in front of a crowd of 16,000. The well-known and widely respected referee Patsy Haley, a former New York boxer, crowned Freeman the winner after fifteen rounds of close fighting, shocking the crowd as well as both boxers. In the second round, Thompson had floored Freeman for a count of six. According to the referee, the victory was given to Freeman based largely on his performance in the last three rounds when he connected with far more punches than Thompson. The championship bout was Thompson's first title defense.

==== Losing the world welterweight championship, April, 1931 ====
Freeman held the title until his rematch with Jack Thompson on April 14, 1931, again in Cleveland, where he lost by TKO in the tenth of fifteen rounds. The bout was stopped due to Freeman's badly battered left eye.

He had a long career as a boxer, and remained fighting as a super welterweight until around 1937. He fought for a year as a middleweight from 1937 to 1938. Best known of his middleweight opponents was Al McCoy, whom he fought on July 2 and 16, 1937, in Pine Bluff, Arkansas.

He died on February 20, 1986, in Little Rock, Arkansas, at 82, an advanced age for a lifelong boxer.

== Professional boxing record ==
All information in this section is derived from BoxRec, unless otherwise stated.

=== Official record ===
224 fights	174 wins	20 losses
By knockout	84	5
By decision	89	15
By disqualification	1	0
Draws	21	
Newspaper decisions/draws	9	

All newspaper decisions are officially regarded as “no decision” bouts and are not counted in the win/loss/draw column.

No.	Result	Record	Opponent	Type	Round	Date	Location	Notes
224	Loss	174–20–21 (9)	Ralph Chong	PTS	10	Aug 10, 1938	Outdoor Arena, Fort Smith, Arkansas, U.S.	
223	Win	174–19–21 (9)	Billy Hood	KO	5 (10)	Apr 25, 1938	Hot Springs, Arkansas, U.S.	
222	Win	173–19–21 (9)	Jimmy Francis	KO	1 (10)	Mar 28, 1938	Hot Springs, Arkansas, U.S.	
221	Win	172–19–21 (9)	King Cole	KO	2 (10)	Mar 17, 1938	Winter Stadium, Fort Smith, Arkansas, U.S.	
220	Win	171–19–21 (9)	Irish Kennedy	KO	3 (10)	Feb 9, 1938	Winter Stadium, Fort Smith, Arkansas, U.S.	
219	Win	170–19–21 (9)	Mike Montoya	KO	5 (10)	Nov 24, 1937	Winter Stadium, Fort Smith, Arkansas, U.S.	
218	Loss	169–19–21 (9)	Gorilla Jones	PTS	10	Aug 9, 1937	Broadway Baseball Park, Council Bluffs, Iowa, U.S.	
217	Win	169–18–21 (9)	Al McCoy	PTS	10	Jul 16, 1937	Stockyards Stadium, Pine Bluff, Arkansas, U.S.	
216	Draw	168–18–21 (9)	Al McCoy	PTS	10	Jul 2, 1937	Stockyards Stadium, Pine Bluff, Arkansas, U.S.	
215	Win	168–18–20 (9)	Charley Jerome	PTS	10	Jun 11, 1937	Hodges Field, Memphis, Tennessee, U.S.	
214	Win	167–18–20 (9)	Charley Jerome	PTS	10	May 27, 1937	American Legion Stadium, Little Rock, Arkansas, U.S.	
213	Win	166–18–20 (9)	Max Elling	TKO	7 (10)	Apr 29, 1937	Open-Air Arena, Houston, Texas, U.S.	
212	Win	165–18–20 (9)	Tiger Red Lewis	TKO	2 (10)	Apr 26, 1937	Hot Springs, Arkansas, U.S.	
211	Win	164–18–20 (9)	Harlan Ray	KO	5 (?)	Apr 12, 1937	Hot Springs, Arkansas, U.S.	
210	Win	163–18–20 (9)	Mickey Breen	KO	4 (?)	Mar 1, 1937	Hot Springs, Arkansas, U.S.	
209	Win	162–18–20 (9)	Frankie Hughes	PTS	10	Jan 25, 1937	Auditorium, Hot Springs, Arkansas, U.S.	
208	Loss	161–18–20 (9)	Oscar Rankins	PTS	10	Dec 4, 1936	Auditorium, Milwaukee, Wisconsin, U.S.	
207	Win	161–17–20 (9)	Joey Parks	PTS	10	Oct 16, 1936	Municipal Auditorium, Saint Louis, Missouri, U.S.	
206	Win	160–17–20 (9)	Sammy Slaughter	PTS	15	Sep 3, 1936	Dubuque, Iowa, U.S.	
205	Win	159–17–20 (9)	Gaylon Stone	KO	6 (10)	Jul 28, 1936	Houck Field Stadium, Cape Girardeau, Missouri, U.S.	
204	Win	158–17–20 (9)	Johnny Phagan	PTS	10	Jul 22, 1936	Northwest Stadium, Chicago, Illinois, U.S.	
203	Draw	157–17–20 (9)	Alabama Kid	PTS	10	May 18, 1936	Quincy, Illinois, U.S.	
202	Win	157–17–19 (9)	Mickey O'Shea	KO	4 (10)	Mar 27, 1936	Hot Springs, Arkansas, U.S.	
201	Win	156–17–19 (9)	Bruce Brown	PTS	10	Mar 21, 1936	Leon Williams Ranch, Moffett, Oklahoma, U.S.	
200	Win	155–17–19 (9)	Karl Lautenschlager	KO	3 (10)	Mar 16, 1936	Wacasino Arena, Fort Smith, Arkansas, U.S.	
199	Loss	154–17–19 (9)	Allen Matthews	UD	10	Mar 3, 1936	Convention Hall, Kansas City, Missouri, U.S.	
198	Win	154–16–19 (9)	Cap Harding	KO	7 (12)	Feb 21, 1936	Hot Springs, Arkansas, U.S.	
197	Win	153–16–19 (9)	Clarence Posey	KO	5 (10)	Feb 11, 1936	Hot Springs, Arkansas, U.S.	
196	Win	152–16–19 (9)	Johnny Owens	KO	3 (10)	Feb 3, 1936	Wacasino Arena, Fort Smith, Arkansas, U.S.	
195	Win	151–16–19 (9)	Bruce Brown	PTS	10	Jan 21, 1936	Convention Hall, Kansas City, Missouri, U.S.	
194	Win	150–16–19 (9)	Johnny Hull	KO	4 (10)	Jan 13, 1936	Wacasino Arena, Fort Smith, Arkansas, U.S.	
193	Draw	149–16–19 (9)	Texas Joe Dundee	PTS	10	Dec 13, 1935	Benjamin Field Arena, Tampa, Florida, U.S.	
192	Win	149–16–18 (9)	Charley Weise	UD	10	Dec 10, 1935	Legion Arena, West Palm Beach, Florida, U.S.	
191	Win	148–16–18 (9)	Frankie Hughes	PTS	10	Dec 5, 1935	Cinderella Ballroom, Miami, Florida, U.S.	
190	Draw	147–16–18 (9)	Texas Joe Dundee	PTS	10	Nov 21, 1935	Auditorium, Orlando, Florida, U.S.	
189	Win	147–16–17 (9)	Tommy Beck	KO	6 (10)	Nov 12, 1935	Jacksonville, Florida, U.S.	
188	Win	146–16–17 (9)	Paddy Creedon	MD	10	Nov 11, 1935	Beach Arena, Miami Beach, Florida, U.S.	
187	Win	145–16–17 (9)	Billy Hood	TKO	6 (10)	Oct 22, 1935	Beach Arena, Miami Beach, Florida, U.S.	
186	Win	144–16–17 (9)	Cap Harding	PTS	10	Sep 30, 1935	Wacasino Arena, Fort Smith, Arkansas, U.S.	
185	Win	143–16–17 (9)	Chief Wilbur	PTS	10	Sep 23, 1935	Wacasino Arena, Fort Smith, Arkansas, U.S.	
184	Win	142–16–17 (9)	Jimmy Carter	KO	4 (10)	Sep 13, 1935	Russellville, Arkansas, U.S.	
183	Win	141–16–17 (9)	Duke Tramel	TKO	6 (10)	Sep 2, 1935	Wacasino Arena, Fort Smith, Arkansas, U.S.	
182	Win	140–16–17 (9)	Honeyboy Lyman	KO	5 (10)	Aug 29, 1935	Bristow, Oklahoma, U.S.	
181	Win	139–16–17 (9)	Paul Ladd	PTS	10	Aug 12, 1935	Wacasino Arena, Fort Smith, Arkansas, U.S.	
180	Win	138–16–17 (9)	Jimmy Carter	KO	3 (?)	Jul 30, 1935	Waldron, Arkansas, U.S.	
179	Win	137–16–17 (9)	Sid Scarlett	KO	3 (10)	Jul 26, 1935	American Legion Stadium, Little Rock, Arkansas, U.S.	
178	Win	136–16–17 (9)	Jimmy Carter	KO	6 (10)	Jul 22, 1935	Wacasino Arena, Fort Smith, Arkansas, U.S.	
177	Win	135–16–17 (9)	Johnny Hull	KO	2 (10)	Jul 19, 1935	American Legion Stadium, Little Rock, Arkansas, U.S.	
176	Win	134–16–17 (9)	Eddie Gree	KO	4 (10)	Jul 12, 1935	American Legion Stadium, Little Rock, Arkansas, U.S.	
175	Win	133–16–17 (9)	Jimmy Carter	KO	2 (10)	Jun 21, 1935	Hot Springs, Arkansas, U.S.	
174	Win	132–16–17 (9)	Johnny Hull	PTS	10	Jun 14, 1935	Wacasino Arena, Fort Smith, Arkansas, U.S.	
173	Win	131–16–17 (9)	Babe Kiser	KO	6 (10)	Jun 7, 1935	Wacasino Arena, Fort Smith, Arkansas, U.S.	
172	Win	130–16–17 (9)	Earl Mason	PTS	10	May 31, 1935	Wacasino Arena, Fort Smith, Arkansas, U.S.	
171	Draw	129–16–17 (9)	Johnny Hull	PTS	10	May 7, 1935	Wacasino Arena, Fort Smith, Arkansas, U.S.	
170	Loss	129–16–16 (9)	Ralph Chong	PTS	10	Oct 8, 1934	City Auditorium, Houston, Texas, U.S.	
169	Win	129–15–16 (9)	Johnny Farrell	PTS	10	Aug 6, 1934	Ringside Arena, Houston, Texas, U.S.	
168	Win	128–15–16 (9)	Ralph Chong	TKO	6 (10)	Jul 12, 1934	Dallas, Texas, U.S.	
167	Win	127–15–16 (9)	Manuel Zermeno	KO	2 (10)	Jul 7, 1934	Fort McIntosh Bowl, Laredo, Texas, U.S.	
166	Draw	126–15–16 (9)	Texas Joe Dundee	PTS	10	Jun 29, 1934	American Legion Arena, Harlingen, Texas, U.S.	
165	Win	126–15–15 (9)	Johnny Kerns	KO	2 (10)	Jun 22, 1934	American Legion Arena, Harlingen, Texas, U.S.	
164	Win	125–15–15 (9)	Texas Joe Dundee	PTS	10	Jun 15, 1934	American Legion Arena, Harlingen, Texas, U.S.	
163	Win	124–15–15 (9)	Babe Kiser	TKO	3 (10)	Jun 5, 1934	Walkathon Arena, San Antonio, Texas, U.S.	
162	Win	123–15–15 (9)	Gus Campbell	KO	8 (10)	May 21, 1934	Houston, Texas, U.S.	
161	Win	122–15–15 (9)	Johnny Farrell	TKO	4 (10)	May 10, 1934	Fair Park Live Stock Arena, Dallas, Texas, U.S.	
160	Win	121–15–15 (9)	Sylvan Bass	PTS	10	Mar 28, 1934	Legion Arena, Fort Lauderdale, Florida, U.S.	
159	Win	120–15–15 (9)	Antonio Dominguez	UD	10	Mar 13, 1934	Legion Armory, Saint Petersburg, Florida, U.S.	
158	Draw	119–15–15 (9)	Billy Thomas	PTS	12	Mar 7, 1934	Legion Arena, Fort Lauderdale, Florida, U.S.	
157	Win	119–15–14 (9)	Norman Conrad	PTS	10	Feb 16, 1934	Cinderella Ballroom, Miami, Florida, U.S.	
156	Win	118–15–14 (9)	Marty Simmons	UD	10	Jan 22, 1934	Biscayne Arena, Miami, Florida, U.S.	
155	Win	117–15–14 (9)	Norman Conrad	PTS	10	Jan 12, 1934	Cinderella Ballroom, Miami, Florida, U.S.	
154	Win	116–15–14 (9)	Roy Bailey	TKO	5 (10)	Dec 18, 1933	Biscayne Arena, Miami, Florida, U.S.	
153	Win	115–15–14 (9)	Jackie King	PTS	15	Dec 4, 1933	Hot Springs, Arkansas, U.S.	
152	Win	114–15–14 (9)	Duke Tramel	PTS	10	Nov 20, 1933	Fort Worth, Texas, U.S.	
151	Win	113–15–14 (9)	Al Salbano	PTS	10	Nov 6, 1933	City Auditorium, Houston, Texas, U.S.	
150	Win	112–15–14 (9)	Texas Joe Dundee	PTS	10	Oct 23, 1933	National Guard Armory, Beaumont, Texas, U.S.	
149	Win	111–15–14 (9)	Jess Akers	TKO	5 (10)	Sep 27, 1933	American Legion Stadium, Greenwood, Mississippi, U.S.	
148	Win	110–15–14 (9)	Buster Mallini	TKO	8 (10)	Sep 14, 1933	City Auditorium, Houston, Texas, U.S.	
147	Win	109–15–14 (9)	Chester Covington	KO	2 (?)	Sep 7, 1933	Jackson, Tennessee, U.S.	
146	Win	108–15–14 (9)	Alabama Kid	PTS	10	Jun 12, 1933	Hickey Park, Millvale, Pennsylvania, U.S.	
145	Loss	107–15–14 (9)	Teddy Yarosz	UD	10	May 22, 1933	Hickey Park, Millvale, Pennsylvania, U.S.	
144	Win	107–14–14 (9)	Jackie King	PTS	10	May 9, 1933	North Little Rock HS Stadium, Little Rock, Arkansas, U.S.	
143	Win	106–14–14 (9)	Tony Hazuda	KO	4 (10)	Apr 28, 1933	Fifth and State Street Arena, Pine Bluff, Arkansas, U.S.	
142	Win	105–14–14 (9)	Freddie Eiler	PTS	10	Apr 3, 1933	Page Garage, Nashville, Tennessee, U.S.	
141	Win	104–14–14 (9)	Jackie King	PTS	10	Mar 20, 1933	Hot Springs, Arkansas, U.S.	
140	Win	103–14–14 (9)	Manuel Quintero	PTS	10	Feb 23, 1933	Hot Springs, Arkansas, U.S.	
139	Draw	102–14–14 (9)	Gorilla Jones	PTS	10	Dec 26, 1932	Motor Square Garden, Pittsburgh, Pennsylvania, U.S.	
138	Loss	102–14–13 (9)	Manuel Quintero	SD	10	Nov 18, 1932	Benjamin Field Arena, Tampa, Florida, U.S.	
137	Win	102–13–13 (9)	Doc Conrad	PTS	10	Nov 11, 1932	Madison Square Garden Stadium, Miami, Florida, U.S.	
136	Win	101–13–13 (9)	Tiger Joe Randall	TKO	6 (10)	Jul 27, 1932	Greenlee Field, Pittsburgh, Pennsylvania, U.S.	
135	Loss	100–13–13 (9)	Tiger Roy Williams	PTS	8	Jun 24, 1932	Municipal Stadium, Cleveland, Ohio, U.S.	
134	Win	100–12–13 (9)	Lee Sala	KO	1 (10)	Jun 23, 1932	Hickey Park, Millvale, Pennsylvania, U.S.	
133	Win	99–12–13 (9)	Buck McTiernan	UD	10	Jun 3, 1932	Hickey Park, Millvale, Pennsylvania, U.S.	
132	Win	98–12–13 (9)	Charley Blanchard	KO	2 (10)	Apr 29, 1932	Hot Springs, Arkansas, U.S.	
131	Win	97–12–13 (9)	Billy Shell	PTS	10	Apr 11, 1932	Biscayne Arena, Miami, Florida, U.S.	
130	Win	96–12–13 (9)	Buster Mallini	TKO	7 (10)	Feb 29, 1932	Biscayne Arena, Miami, Florida, U.S.	
129	Win	95–12–13 (9)	Owen Phelps	PTS	10	Feb 18, 1932	Cinderella Ballroom, Miami, Florida, U.S.	
128	Win	94–12–13 (9)	Harry Wallach	KO	4 (10)	Feb 2, 1932	Jacksonville, Florida, U.S.	
127	Win	93–12–13 (9)	Billy Shell	TKO	7 (10)	Jan 8, 1932	Coliseum, Coral Gables, Florida, U.S.	
126	Win	92–12–13 (9)	Relampago Saguero	PTS	10	Dec 18, 1931	Benjamin Field Arena, Tampa, Florida, U.S.	
125	Win	91–12–13 (9)	Spike Webb	PTS	10	Nov 23, 1931	Biscayne Arena, Miami, Florida, U.S.	
124	Win	90–12–13 (9)	Canada Lee	PTS	10	Jun 19, 1931	Carney Auditorium, Erie, Pennsylvania, U.S.	
123	Win	89–12–13 (9)	Buck McTiernan	SD	10	May 25, 1931	Meyers Bowl, North Braddock, Pennsylvania, U.S.	
122	Loss	88–12–13 (9)	Young Jack Thompson	TKO	12 (15)	Apr 14, 1931	Public Hall, Cleveland, Ohio, U.S.	Lost NBA, NYSAC, and The Ring welterweight titles
121	Win	88–11–13 (9)	Alfredo Gaona	PTS	10	Mar 1, 1931	El Toreo de Cuatro Caminos, Mexico City, Distrito Federal, Mexico	
120	Win	87–11–13 (9)	Roy Stevens	KO	8 (10)	Feb 17, 1931	Smelter Arena, El Paso, Texas, U.S.	
119	Win	86–11–13 (9)	Cowboy Dula	PTS	6	Feb 16, 1931	City Recreation Hall, Fort Worth, Texas, U.S.	
118	Win	85–11–13 (9)	Al Kober	TKO	5 (10)	Feb 9, 1931	Coliseum Arena, New Orleans, Louisiana, U.S.	
117	Win	84–11–13 (9)	Duke Tramel	KO	5 (8)	Feb 5, 1931	Auditorium, Memphis, Tennessee, U.S.	
116	Win	83–11–13 (9)	Eddie Murdock	PTS	10	Jan 26, 1931	Merrie Garden, Oklahoma City, Oklahoma, U.S.	
115	Win	82–11–13 (9)	Pete August	PTS	10	Jan 9, 1931	Auditorium, Hot Springs, Arkansas, U.S.	
114	Win	81–11–13 (9)	Young Jack Thompson	PTS	15	Sep 5, 1930	League Park, Cleveland, Ohio, U.S.	Won NBA, NYSAC, and The Ring welterweight titles
113	Win	80–11–13 (9)	David Velasco	TKO	10 (10)	Aug 25, 1930	American Legion Stadium, Little Rock, Arkansas, U.S.	
112	Win	79–11–13 (9)	Canada Lee	PTS	10	Aug 8, 1930	Carney Auditorium, Erie, Pennsylvania, U.S.	
111	Win	78–11–13 (9)	Billy Alger	PTS	10	Jun 25, 1930	Taylor Bowl, Newburgh Heights, Ohio, U.S.	
110	Loss	77–11–13 (9)	Jackie Fields	TKO	4 (12)	Apr 8, 1930	Public Hall, Cleveland, Ohio, U.S.	
109	Win	77–10–13 (9)	Denny Burns	PTS	10	Mar 25, 1930	Auditorium, Hot Springs, Arkansas, U.S.	
108	Win	76–10–13 (9)	Grover Mallini	PTS	8	Mar 10, 1930	Auditorium, Memphis, Tennessee, U.S.	
107	Win	75–10–13 (9)	Louis Andrews	KO	7 (10)	Feb 21, 1930	Auditorium, Hot Springs, Arkansas, U.S.	
106	Win	74–10–13 (9)	Bobby LaSalle	PTS	10	Jan 31, 1930	Carney Auditorium, Erie, Pennsylvania, U.S.	
105	Draw	73–10–13 (9)	Paul Pirrone	PTS	10	Jan 20, 1930	Public Hall, Cleveland, Ohio, U.S.	
104	Win	73–10–12 (9)	Young Jack Thompson	PTS	10	Jan 10, 1930	Olympia Stadium, Detroit, Michigan, U.S.	
103	Win	72–10–12 (9)	Clyde Hull	PTS	10	Dec 10, 1929	Auditorium, Hot Springs, Arkansas, U.S.	
102	Win	71–10–12 (9)	Joe Reno	PTS	10	Dec 6, 1929	Carney Auditorium, Erie, Pennsylvania, U.S.	
101	Win	70–10–12 (9)	Jack Manley	TKO	5 (10)	Dec 2, 1929	Motor Square Garden, Pittsburgh, Pennsylvania, U.S.	
100	Win	69–10–12 (9)	Farmer Joe Cooper	TKO	1 (10)	Nov 19, 1929	Public Hall, Cleveland, Ohio, U.S.	
99	Win	68–10–12 (9)	Bucky Lawless	KO	7 (10)	Oct 25, 1929	Erie, Pennsylvania, U.S.	
98	Win	67–10–12 (9)	Georgie Levine	PTS	10	Oct 14, 1929	Motor Square Garden, Pittsburgh, Pennsylvania, U.S.	
97	Win	66–10–12 (9)	Sam Bruce	TKO	9 (10)	Sep 27, 1929	Carney Auditorium, Erie, Pennsylvania, U.S.	
96	Loss	65–10–12 (9)	Bucky Lawless	PTS	10	Aug 21, 1929	Taylor Bowl, Newburgh Heights, Ohio, U.S.	
95	Win	65–9–12 (9)	Joe Schlocker	TKO	8 (10)	Jul 26, 1929	Outdoor Arena, Erie, Pennsylvania, U.S.	
94	Draw	64–9–12 (9)	Andy DiVodi	PTS	10	Apr 26, 1929	Chicago Stadium, Chicago, Illinois, U.S.	
93	Draw	64–9–11 (9)	Gorilla Jones	PTS	12	Apr 9, 1929	Public Hall, Cleveland, Ohio, U.S.	
92	Win	64–9–10 (9)	Tillie Herman	TKO	2 (10)	Mar 22, 1929	Erie Arena, Erie, Pennsylvania, U.S.	
91	Win	63–9–10 (9)	Alf Ros	PTS	10	Mar 11, 1929	Madison Square Garden, New York City, New York, U.S.	
90	Win	62–9–10 (9)	Joe Simonich	PTS	10	Feb 18, 1929	White City Arena, Chicago, Illinois, U.S.	
89	Loss	61–9–10 (9)	Gorilla Jones	SD	10	Aug 15, 1928	Taylor Bowl, Newburgh Heights, Ohio, U.S.	
88	Win	61–8–10 (9)	Willie Harmon	KO	3 (12)	Mar 29, 1928	Public Hall, Cleveland, Ohio, U.S.	
87	Win	60–8–10 (9)	Al Van Ryan	NWS	10	Feb 29, 1928	Auditorium, Milwaukee, Wisconsin, U.S.	
86	Win	60–8–10 (8)	My Sullivan	UD	10	Nov 25, 1927	Coliseum, Chicago, Illinois, U.S.	
85	Loss	59–8–10 (8)	Johnny Indrisano	PTS	10	Oct 7, 1927	Mechanics Building, Boston, Massachusetts, U.S.	
84	Win	59–7–10 (8)	Sailor Darden	TKO	5 (10)	Sep 30, 1927	Arena, Syracuse, New York, U.S.	
83	Win	58–7–10 (8)	Harry Mason	PTS	10	Aug 18, 1927	Madison Square Garden, New York City, New York, U.S.	
82	Win	57–7–10 (8)	Billy Piltz	TKO	9 (12)	Aug 10, 1927	Armory, Toledo, Ohio, U.S.	
81	Win	56–7–10 (8)	Sailor Darden	PTS	10	Jul 1, 1927	Erie Arena, Erie, Pennsylvania, U.S.	
80	Win	55–7–10 (8)	Joe Simonich	PTS	10	Jun 13, 1927	Braves Field, Boston, Massachusetts, U.S.	
79	Win	54–7–10 (8)	Meyer Grace	PTS	10	May 31, 1927	Wrigley Field, Chicago, Illinois, U.S.	
78	Win	53–7–10 (8)	Mike Dempsey	KO	4 (10)	May 6, 1927	Erie Arena, Erie, Pennsylvania, U.S.	
77	Win	52–7–10 (8)	Arthur Schaekels	KO	6 (10)	Feb 25, 1927	Benjamin Field Arena, Tampa, Florida, U.S.	
76	Win	51–7–10 (8)	Arthur Schaekels	KO	2 (10)	Feb 4, 1927	Benjamin Field Arena, Tampa, Florida, U.S.	
75	Draw	50–7–10 (8)	Jack Zivic	PTS	12	Oct 25, 1926	Public Hall, Cleveland, Ohio, U.S.	
74	Win	50–7–9 (8)	Georgie Levine	NWS	10	Sep 30, 1926	Taylor Bowl, Newburgh Heights, Ohio, U.S.	
73	Draw	50–7–9 (7)	Sergeant Sammy Baker	PTS	10	Jul 22, 1926	Madison Square Garden, New York City, New York, U.S.	
72	Win	50–7–8 (7)	Pinky Mitchell	NWS	10	Jun 22, 1926	Olympic Arena, Brooklyn, Ohio, U.S.	
71	Win	50–7–8 (6)	Paul Doyle	PTS	10	May 28, 1926	Coney Island Stadium, Brooklyn, New York City, New York, U.S.	
70	Win	49–7–8 (6)	Joe Simonich	PTS	12	May 19, 1926	Public Hall, Cleveland, Ohio, U.S.	
69	Win	48–7–8 (6)	Shuffle Callahan	TKO	11 (12)	Apr 6, 1926	Public Hall, Cleveland, Ohio, U.S.	
68	Loss	47–7–8 (6)	Joe Dundee	TKO	5 (10)	Mar 1, 1926	Madison Square Garden, New York City, New York, U.S.	
67	Win	47–6–8 (6)	Joe Simonich	PTS	10	Feb 19, 1926	Madison Square Garden, New York City, New York, U.S.	
66	Win	46–6–8 (6)	Norman Genet	PTS	10	Feb 4, 1926	Auditorium, Hot Springs, Arkansas, U.S.	
65	Win	45–6–8 (6)	Sergeant Sammy Baker	TKO	7 (10)	Jan 1, 1926	Madison Square Garden, New York City, New York, U.S.	
64	Win	44–6–8 (6)	Al Walthers	TKO	4 (10)	Nov 18, 1925	Public Hall, Cleveland, Ohio, U.S.	
63	Win	43–6–8 (6)	Teddy Easterbrook	NWS	10	Nov 11, 1925	Armory, Toledo, Ohio, U.S.	
62	Win	43–6–8 (5)	Let Philbin	KO	5 (10)	Oct 14, 1925	Armory, Toledo, Ohio, U.S.	
61	Win	42–6–8 (5)	Al Walthers	TKO	5 (10)	Sep 30, 1925	Olympic Arena, Brooklyn, Ohio, U.S.	
60	Win	41–6–8 (5)	Henry Shaw	TKO	3 (10)	Sep 16, 1925	Olympic Arena, Brooklyn, Ohio, U.S.	
59	Draw	40–6–8 (5)	Jimmy Jones	NWS	6	Sep 1, 1925	Olympic Arena, Brooklyn, Ohio, U.S.	
58	Win	40–6–8 (4)	Mike Dempsey	TKO	5 (6)	Aug 18, 1925	Olympic Arena, Brooklyn, Ohio, U.S.	
57	Win	39–6–8 (4)	Dave Forbes	TKO	2 (6)	Aug 4, 1925	Olympic Arena, Brooklyn, Ohio, U.S.	
56	Win	38–6–8 (4)	Floyd Hybert	PTS	10	Jul 10, 1925	Erie, Pennsylvania, U.S.	
55	Draw	37–6–8 (4)	Jimmy Jones	SD	10	Jun 12, 1925	Erie Arena, Erie, Pennsylvania, U.S.	
54	Win	37–6–7 (4)	Frisco McGale	PTS	8	May 7, 1925	Mechanics Building, Boston, Massachusetts, U.S.	
53	Win	36–6–7 (4)	Benny Ross	PTS	8	Apr 17, 1925	Mechanics Building, Boston, Massachusetts, U.S.	
52	Win	35–6–7 (4)	Bill Brown	KO	8 (10)	Apr 3, 1925	Auditorium, Hot Springs, Arkansas, U.S.	
51	Win	34–6–7 (4)	Jack Willis	PTS	10	Feb 17, 1925	Auditorium, Hot Springs, Arkansas, U.S.	
50	Win	33–6–7 (4)	Pat Corbett	PTS	10	Jan 30, 1925	Merrie Garden, Oklahoma City, Oklahoma, U.S.	
49	Win	32–6–7 (4)	Hamp Brown	KO	3 (10)	Jan 8, 1925	Auditorium, Hot Springs, Arkansas, U.S.	
48	Win	31–6–7 (4)	Humbert Brady	PTS	8	Dec 1, 1924	Lyric Theater, Memphis, Tennessee, U.S.	
47	Win	30–6–7 (4)	Hamp Brown	PTS	8	Nov 24, 1924	Southern A.C., Memphis, Tennessee, U.S.	
46	Win	29–6–7 (4)	Al Knowles	KO	4 (15)	Nov 17, 1924	Coliseum Arena, New Orleans, Louisiana, U.S.	
45	Win	28–6–7 (4)	Young Tansey	KO	6 (10)	Oct 13, 1924	Erie, Pennsylvania, U.S.	
44	Win	27–6–7 (4)	Jack Oakes	PTS	10	Sep 29, 1924	Park Opera House, Erie, Pennsylvania, U.S.	
43	Win	26–6–7 (4)	Johnny Shea	KO	3 (?)	Aug 7, 1924	El Dorado, Texas, U.S.	Unknown date
42	Win	25–6–7 (4)	Pinky Mitchell	PTS	15	Jun 2, 1924	Coliseum Arena, New Orleans, Louisiana, U.S.	
41	Win	24–6–7 (4)	Jimmy Finley	PTS	10	Apr 5, 1924	Benjamin Field Arena, Tampa, Florida, U.S.	
40	Win	23–6–7 (4)	Enrique Ponce de Leon	SD	10	Mar 28, 1924	Benjamin Field Arena, Tampa, Florida, U.S.	
39	Win	22–6–7 (4)	Jimmy Cox	PTS	10	Mar 7, 1924	Benjamin Field Arena, Tampa, Florida, U.S.	
38	Win	21–6–7 (4)	Frankie Murphy	NWS	10	Jan 15, 1924	Auditorium, Hot Springs, Arkansas, U.S.	
37	Win	21–6–7 (3)	Jimmy Cox	PTS	15	Jan 11, 1924	Coliseum Arena, New Orleans, Louisiana, U.S.	
36	Win	20–6–7 (3)	Red Hill	PTS	15	Nov 16, 1923	Coliseum Arena, New Orleans, Louisiana, U.S.	
35	Win	19–6–7 (3)	Chuck Burns	PTS	8	Nov 5, 1923	Southern A.C., Memphis, Tennessee, U.S.	
34	Win	18–6–7 (3)	Johnny Tillman	PTS	15	Sep 28, 1923	Tulane Arena, New Orleans, Louisiana, U.S.	
33	Win	17–6–7 (3)	Al Yoakum	KO	13 (15)	Sep 17, 1923	Coliseum Arena, New Orleans, Louisiana, U.S.	
32	Win	16–6–7 (3)	Dude Martinez	KO	7 (15)	Jul 23, 1923	Coliseum Arena, New Orleans, Louisiana, U.S.	
31	Win	15–6–7 (3)	Billy Brown	NWS	10	Jul 4, 1923	Whittington Park, Hot Springs, Arkansas, U.S.	
30	Win	15–6–7 (2)	Grady Franklin	PTS	15	Apr 16, 1923	Pierre Avenue Arena, Shreveport, Louisiana, U.S.	
29	Win	14–6–7 (2)	Dummy McKinney	DQ	14 (15)	Apr 2, 1923	Pierre Avenue Arena, Shreveport, Louisiana, U.S.	
28	Loss	13–6–7 (2)	Frankie Jones	PTS	8	Feb 19, 1923	Southern A.C., Memphis, Tennessee, U.S.	
27	Loss	13–5–7 (2)	Jimmy King	TKO	7 (15)	Jan 24, 1923	Coliseum Arena, New Orleans, Louisiana, U.S.	
26	Win	13–4–7 (2)	Tom Storie	NWS	10	Jan 3, 1923	Auditorium, Hot Springs, Arkansas, U.S.	
25	Win	13–4–7 (1)	Pat Burke	PTS	15	Nov 15, 1922	Coliseum Arena, New Orleans, Louisiana, U.S.	
24	Loss	12–4–7 (1)	Dude Martinez	PTS	10	Sep 18, 1922	Louisiana Auditorium, New Orleans, Louisiana, U.S.	
23	Loss	12–3–7 (1)	Al Monroe	PTS	8	Sep 4, 1922	Southern A.C., Memphis, Tennessee, U.S.	
22	Win	12–2–7 (1)	Dummy McKinney	PTS	8	Jul 31, 1922	Southern A.C., Memphis, Tennessee, U.S.	
21	Win	11–2–7 (1)	Doug Lee	PTS	8	Jul 17, 1922	Southern A.C., Memphis, Tennessee, U.S.	
20	Loss	10–2–7 (1)	Jimmy Dunn	PTS	10	Mar 29, 1922	Auditorium, Hot Springs, Arkansas, U.S.	
19	Win	10–1–7 (1)	Al Thomas	KO	3 (10)	Mar 18, 1922	Auditorium, Hot Springs, Arkansas, U.S.	
18	Win	9–1–7 (1)	Ray Maywood	KO	3 (6)	Mar 8, 1922	Auditorium, Hot Springs, Arkansas, U.S.	
17	Draw	8–1–7 (1)	Ray Rivers	NWS	10	Feb 23, 1922	Auditorium, Hot Springs, Arkansas, U.S.	
16	Draw	8–1–7	Voti Plymale	PTS	6	Feb 1, 1922	Hot Springs, Arkansas, U.S.	
15	Win	8–1–6	Sailor Jack	TKO	1 (6)	Jan 24, 1922	Hot Springs, Arkansas, U.S.	
14	Win	7–1–6	Billy Ryan	PTS	4	Nov 16, 1921	Auditorium, Hot Springs, Arkansas, U.S.	
13	Draw	6–1–6	Cliff Foley	PTS	4	Apr 27, 1921	Auditorium, Hot Springs, Arkansas, U.S.	
12	Draw	6–1–5	Cliff Foley	PTS	6	Apr 20, 1921	Auditorium, Hot Springs, Arkansas, U.S.	
11	Draw	6–1–4	Jack Brennan	PTS	4	Mar 30, 1921	Auditorium, Hot Springs, Arkansas, U.S.	
10	Draw	6–1–3	Kid Coster	PTS	6	Mar 7, 1921	Auditorium, Hot Springs, Arkansas, U.S.	
9	Win	6–1–2	Soldier Riley	KO	1 (6)	Mar 4, 1921	Auditorium, Hot Springs, Arkansas, U.S.	
8	Win	5–1–2	Herb Elder	KO	4 (6)	Jan 31, 1921	Auditorium, Hot Springs, Arkansas, U.S.	
7	Win	4–1–2	Kid Hall	PTS	4	Jan 10, 1921	Auditorium, Hot Springs, Arkansas, U.S.	
6	Draw	3–1–2	Frankie Manilla	PTS	6	Dec 7, 1920	Elks Club Room, Hot Springs, Arkansas, U.S.	
5	Win	3–1–1	Sammy Caldwell	KO	3 (?)	Mar 19, 1920	Auditorium, Hot Springs, Arkansas, U.S.	
4	Win	2–1–1	Sammy Caldwell	PTS	4	Mar 11, 1920	Auditorium, Hot Springs, Arkansas, U.S.	
3	Draw	1–1–1	Kid Fort Pitt	PTS	4	Feb 26, 1920	Auditorium, Hot Springs, Arkansas, U.S.	
2	Win	1–1	Kid Cootey	KO	3 (6)	Feb 18, 1920	Auditorium, Hot Springs, Arkansas, U.S.	
1	Loss	0–1	Billy Kennedy	TKO	3 (4)	Feb 9, 1920	Auditorium, Hot Springs, Arkansas, U.S.	

=== Unofficial record ===
226 fights	183 wins	20 losses
By knockout	84	5
By decision	98	15
By disqualification	1	0
Draws	23	

Record with the inclusion of newspaper decisions in the win/loss/draw column.

No.	Result	Record	Opponent	Type	Round	Date	Location	Notes
224	Loss	181–20–23	Ralph Chong	PTS	10	Aug 10, 1938	Outdoor Arena, Fort Smith, Arkansas, U.S.	
223	Win	181–19–23	Billy Hood	KO	5 (10)	Apr 25, 1938	Hot Springs, Arkansas, U.S.	
222	Win	180–19–23	Jimmy Francis	KO	1 (10)	Mar 28, 1938	Hot Springs, Arkansas, U.S.	
221	Win	179–19–23	King Cole	KO	2 (10)	Mar 17, 1938	Winter Stadium, Fort Smith, Arkansas, U.S.	
220	Win	178–19–23	Irish Kennedy	KO	3 (10)	Feb 9, 1938	Winter Stadium, Fort Smith, Arkansas, U.S.	
219	Win	177–19–23	Mike Montoya	KO	5 (10)	Nov 24, 1937	Winter Stadium, Fort Smith, Arkansas, U.S.	
218	Loss	176–19–23	Gorilla Jones	PTS	10	Aug 9, 1937	Broadway Baseball Park, Council Bluffs, Iowa, U.S.	
217	Win	176–18–23	Al McCoy	PTS	10	Jul 16, 1937	Stockyards Stadium, Pine Bluff, Arkansas, U.S.	
216	Draw	175–18–23	Al McCoy	PTS	10	Jul 2, 1937	Stockyards Stadium, Pine Bluff, Arkansas, U.S.	
215	Win	175–18–22	Charley Jerome	PTS	10	Jun 11, 1937	Hodges Field, Memphis, Tennessee, U.S.	
214	Win	174–18–22	Charley Jerome	PTS	10	May 27, 1937	American Legion Stadium, Little Rock, Arkansas, U.S.	
213	Win	173–18–22	Max Elling	TKO	7 (10)	Apr 29, 1937	Open-Air Arena, Houston, Texas, U.S.	
212	Win	172–18–22	Tiger Red Lewis	TKO	2 (10)	Apr 26, 1937	Hot Springs, Arkansas, U.S.	
211	Win	171–18–22	Harlan Ray	KO	5 (?)	Apr 12, 1937	Hot Springs, Arkansas, U.S.	
210	Win	170–18–22	Mickey Breen	KO	4 (?)	Mar 1, 1937	Hot Springs, Arkansas, U.S.	
209	Win	169–18–22	Frankie Hughes	PTS	10	Jan 25, 1937	Auditorium, Hot Springs, Arkansas, U.S.	
208	Loss	168–18–22	Oscar Rankins	PTS	10	Dec 4, 1936	Auditorium, Milwaukee, Wisconsin, U.S.	
207	Win	168–17–22	Joey Parks	PTS	10	Oct 16, 1936	Municipal Auditorium, Saint Louis, Missouri, U.S.	
206	Win	167–17–22	Sammy Slaughter	PTS	15	Sep 3, 1936	Dubuque, Iowa, U.S.	
205	Win	166–17–22	Gaylon Stone	KO	6 (10)	Jul 28, 1936	Houck Field Stadium, Cape Girardeau, Missouri, U.S.	
204	Win	165–17–22	Johnny Phagan	PTS	10	Jul 22, 1936	Northwest Stadium, Chicago, Illinois, U.S.	
203	Draw	164–17–22	Alabama Kid	PTS	10	May 18, 1936	Quincy, Illinois, U.S.	
202	Win	164–17–21	Mickey O'Shea	KO	4 (10)	Mar 27, 1936	Hot Springs, Arkansas, U.S.	
201	Win	163–17–21	Bruce Brown	PTS	10	Mar 21, 1936	Leon Williams Ranch, Moffett, Oklahoma, U.S.	
200	Win	162–17–21	Karl Lautenschlager	KO	3 (10)	Mar 16, 1936	Wacasino Arena, Fort Smith, Arkansas, U.S.	
199	Loss	161–17–21	Allen Matthews	UD	10	Mar 3, 1936	Convention Hall, Kansas City, Missouri, U.S.	
198	Win	161–16–21	Cap Harding	KO	7 (12)	Feb 21, 1936	Hot Springs, Arkansas, U.S.	
197	Win	160–16–21	Clarence Posey	KO	5 (10)	Feb 11, 1936	Hot Springs, Arkansas, U.S.	
196	Win	159–16–21	Johnny Owens	KO	3 (10)	Feb 3, 1936	Wacasino Arena, Fort Smith, Arkansas, U.S.	
195	Win	158–16–21	Bruce Brown	PTS	10	Jan 21, 1936	Convention Hall, Kansas City, Missouri, U.S.	
194	Win	157–16–21	Johnny Hull	KO	4 (10)	Jan 13, 1936	Wacasino Arena, Fort Smith, Arkansas, U.S.	
193	Draw	156–16–21	Texas Joe Dundee	PTS	10	Dec 13, 1935	Benjamin Field Arena, Tampa, Florida, U.S.	
192	Win	156–16–20	Charley Weise	UD	10	Dec 10, 1935	Legion Arena, West Palm Beach, Florida, U.S.	
191	Win	155–16–20	Frankie Hughes	PTS	10	Dec 5, 1935	Cinderella Ballroom, Miami, Florida, U.S.	
190	Draw	154–16–20	Texas Joe Dundee	PTS	10	Nov 21, 1935	Auditorium, Orlando, Florida, U.S.	
189	Win	154–16–19	Tommy Beck	KO	6 (10)	Nov 12, 1935	Jacksonville, Florida, U.S.	
188	Win	153–16–19	Paddy Creedon	MD	10	Nov 11, 1935	Beach Arena, Miami Beach, Florida, U.S.	
187	Win	152–16–19	Billy Hood	TKO	6 (10)	Oct 22, 1935	Beach Arena, Miami Beach, Florida, U.S.	
186	Win	151–16–19	Cap Harding	PTS	10	Sep 30, 1935	Wacasino Arena, Fort Smith, Arkansas, U.S.	
185	Win	150–16–19	Chief Wilbur	PTS	10	Sep 23, 1935	Wacasino Arena, Fort Smith, Arkansas, U.S.	
184	Win	149–16–19	Jimmy Carter	KO	4 (10)	Sep 13, 1935	Russellville, Arkansas, U.S.	
183	Win	148–16–19	Duke Tramel	TKO	6 (10)	Sep 2, 1935	Wacasino Arena, Fort Smith, Arkansas, U.S.	
182	Win	147–16–19	Honeyboy Lyman	KO	5 (10)	Aug 29, 1935	Bristow, Oklahoma, U.S.	
181	Win	146–16–19	Paul Ladd	PTS	10	Aug 12, 1935	Wacasino Arena, Fort Smith, Arkansas, U.S.	
180	Win	145–16–19	Jimmy Carter	KO	3 (?)	Jul 30, 1935	Waldron, Arkansas, U.S.	
179	Win	144–16–19	Sid Scarlett	KO	3 (10)	Jul 26, 1935	American Legion Stadium, Little Rock, Arkansas, U.S.	
178	Win	143–16–19	Jimmy Carter	KO	6 (10)	Jul 22, 1935	Wacasino Arena, Fort Smith, Arkansas, U.S.	
177	Win	142–16–19	Johnny Hull	KO	2 (10)	Jul 19, 1935	American Legion Stadium, Little Rock, Arkansas, U.S.	
176	Win	141–16–19	Eddie Gree	KO	4 (10)	Jul 12, 1935	American Legion Stadium, Little Rock, Arkansas, U.S.	
175	Win	140–16–19	Jimmy Carter	KO	2 (10)	Jun 21, 1935	Hot Springs, Arkansas, U.S.	
174	Win	139–16–19	Johnny Hull	PTS	10	Jun 14, 1935	Wacasino Arena, Fort Smith, Arkansas, U.S.	
173	Win	138–16–19	Babe Kiser	KO	6 (10)	Jun 7, 1935	Wacasino Arena, Fort Smith, Arkansas, U.S.	
172	Win	137–16–19	Earl Mason	PTS	10	May 31, 1935	Wacasino Arena, Fort Smith, Arkansas, U.S.	
171	Draw	136–16–19	Johnny Hull	PTS	10	May 7, 1935	Wacasino Arena, Fort Smith, Arkansas, U.S.	
170	Loss	136–16–18	Ralph Chong	PTS	10	Oct 8, 1934	City Auditorium, Houston, Texas, U.S.	
169	Win	136–15–18	Johnny Farrell	PTS	10	Aug 6, 1934	Ringside Arena, Houston, Texas, U.S.	
168	Win	135–15–18	Ralph Chong	TKO	6 (10)	Jul 12, 1934	Dallas, Texas, U.S.	
167	Win	134–15–18	Manuel Zermeno	KO	2 (10)	Jul 7, 1934	Fort McIntosh Bowl, Laredo, Texas, U.S.	
166	Draw	133–15–18	Texas Joe Dundee	PTS	10	Jun 29, 1934	American Legion Arena, Harlingen, Texas, U.S.	
165	Win	133–15–17	Johnny Kerns	KO	2 (10)	Jun 22, 1934	American Legion Arena, Harlingen, Texas, U.S.	
164	Win	132–15–17	Texas Joe Dundee	PTS	10	Jun 15, 1934	American Legion Arena, Harlingen, Texas, U.S.	
163	Win	131–15–17	Babe Kiser	TKO	3 (10)	Jun 5, 1934	Walkathon Arena, San Antonio, Texas, U.S.	
162	Win	130–15–17	Gus Campbell	KO	8 (10)	May 21, 1934	Houston, Texas, U.S.	
161	Win	129–15–17	Johnny Farrell	TKO	4 (10)	May 10, 1934	Fair Park Live Stock Arena, Dallas, Texas, U.S.	
160	Win	128–15–17	Sylvan Bass	PTS	10	Mar 28, 1934	Legion Arena, Fort Lauderdale, Florida, U.S.	
159	Win	127–15–17	Antonio Dominguez	UD	10	Mar 13, 1934	Legion Armory, Saint Petersburg, Florida, U.S.	
158	Draw	126–15–17	Billy Thomas	PTS	12	Mar 7, 1934	Legion Arena, Fort Lauderdale, Florida, U.S.	
157	Win	126–15–16	Norman Conrad	PTS	10	Feb 16, 1934	Cinderella Ballroom, Miami, Florida, U.S.	
156	Win	125–15–16	Marty Simmons	UD	10	Jan 22, 1934	Biscayne Arena, Miami, Florida, U.S.	
155	Win	124–15–16	Norman Conrad	PTS	10	Jan 12, 1934	Cinderella Ballroom, Miami, Florida, U.S.	
154	Win	123–15–16	Roy Bailey	TKO	5 (10)	Dec 18, 1933	Biscayne Arena, Miami, Florida, U.S.	
153	Win	122–15–16	Jackie King	PTS	15	Dec 4, 1933	Hot Springs, Arkansas, U.S.	
152	Win	121–15–16	Duke Tramel	PTS	10	Nov 20, 1933	Fort Worth, Texas, U.S.	
151	Win	120–15–16	Al Salbano	PTS	10	Nov 6, 1933	City Auditorium, Houston, Texas, U.S.	
150	Win	119–15–16	Texas Joe Dundee	PTS	10	Oct 23, 1933	National Guard Armory, Beaumont, Texas, U.S.	
149	Win	118–15–16	Jess Akers	TKO	5 (10)	Sep 27, 1933	American Legion Stadium, Greenwood, Mississippi, U.S.	
148	Win	117–15–16	Buster Mallini	TKO	8 (10)	Sep 14, 1933	City Auditorium, Houston, Texas, U.S.	
147	Win	116–15–16	Chester Covington	KO	2 (?)	Sep 7, 1933	Jackson, Tennessee, U.S.	
146	Win	115–15–16	Alabama Kid	PTS	10	Jun 12, 1933	Hickey Park, Millvale, Pennsylvania, U.S.	
145	Loss	114–15–16	Teddy Yarosz	UD	10	May 22, 1933	Hickey Park, Millvale, Pennsylvania, U.S.	
144	Win	114–14–16	Jackie King	PTS	10	May 9, 1933	North Little Rock HS Stadium, Little Rock, Arkansas, U.S.	
143	Win	113–14–16	Tony Hazuda	KO	4 (10)	Apr 28, 1933	Fifth and State Street Arena, Pine Bluff, Arkansas, U.S.	
142	Win	112–14–16	Freddie Eiler	PTS	10	Apr 3, 1933	Page Garage, Nashville, Tennessee, U.S.	
141	Win	111–14–16	Jackie King	PTS	10	Mar 20, 1933	Hot Springs, Arkansas, U.S.	
140	Win	110–14–16	Manuel Quintero	PTS	10	Feb 23, 1933	Hot Springs, Arkansas, U.S.	
139	Draw	109–14–16	Gorilla Jones	PTS	10	Dec 26, 1932	Motor Square Garden, Pittsburgh, Pennsylvania, U.S.	
138	Loss	109–14–15	Manuel Quintero	SD	10	Nov 18, 1932	Benjamin Field Arena, Tampa, Florida, U.S.	
137	Win	109–13–15	Doc Conrad	PTS	10	Nov 11, 1932	Madison Square Garden Stadium, Miami, Florida, U.S.	
136	Win	108–13–15	Tiger Joe Randall	TKO	6 (10)	Jul 27, 1932	Greenlee Field, Pittsburgh, Pennsylvania, U.S.	
135	Loss	107–13–15	Tiger Roy Williams	PTS	8	Jun 24, 1932	Municipal Stadium, Cleveland, Ohio, U.S.	
134	Win	107–12–15	Lee Sala	KO	1 (10)	Jun 23, 1932	Hickey Park, Millvale, Pennsylvania, U.S.	
133	Win	106–12–15	Buck McTiernan	UD	10	Jun 3, 1932	Hickey Park, Millvale, Pennsylvania, U.S.	
132	Win	105–12–15	Charley Blanchard	KO	2 (10)	Apr 29, 1932	Hot Springs, Arkansas, U.S.	
131	Win	104–12–15	Billy Shell	PTS	10	Apr 11, 1932	Biscayne Arena, Miami, Florida, U.S.	
130	Win	103–12–15	Buster Mallini	TKO	7 (10)	Feb 29, 1932	Biscayne Arena, Miami, Florida, U.S.	
129	Win	102–12–15	Owen Phelps	PTS	10	Feb 18, 1932	Cinderella Ballroom, Miami, Florida, U.S.	
128	Win	101–12–15	Harry Wallach	KO	4 (10)	Feb 2, 1932	Jacksonville, Florida, U.S.	
127	Win	100–12–15	Billy Shell	TKO	7 (10)	Jan 8, 1932	Coliseum, Coral Gables, Florida, U.S.	
126	Win	99–12–15	Relampago Saguero	PTS	10	Dec 18, 1931	Benjamin Field Arena, Tampa, Florida, U.S.	
125	Win	98–12–15	Spike Webb	PTS	10	Nov 23, 1931	Biscayne Arena, Miami, Florida, U.S.	
124	Win	97–12–15	Canada Lee	PTS	10	Jun 19, 1931	Carney Auditorium, Erie, Pennsylvania, U.S.	
123	Win	96–12–15	Buck McTiernan	SD	10	May 25, 1931	Meyers Bowl, North Braddock, Pennsylvania, U.S.	
122	Loss	95–12–15	Young Jack Thompson	TKO	12 (15)	Apr 14, 1931	Public Hall, Cleveland, Ohio, U.S.	Lost NBA, NYSAC, and The Ring welterweight titles
121	Win	95–11–15	Alfredo Gaona	PTS	10	Mar 1, 1931	El Toreo de Cuatro Caminos, Mexico City, Distrito Federal, Mexico	
120	Win	94–11–15	Roy Stevens	KO	8 (10)	Feb 17, 1931	Smelter Arena, El Paso, Texas, U.S.	
119	Win	93–11–15	Cowboy Dula	PTS	6	Feb 16, 1931	City Recreation Hall, Fort Worth, Texas, U.S.	
118	Win	92–11–15	Al Kober	TKO	5 (10)	Feb 9, 1931	Coliseum Arena, New Orleans, Louisiana, U.S.	
117	Win	91–11–15	Duke Tramel	KO	5 (8)	Feb 5, 1931	Auditorium, Memphis, Tennessee, U.S.	
116	Win	90–11–15	Eddie Murdock	PTS	10	Jan 26, 1931	Merrie Garden, Oklahoma City, Oklahoma, U.S.	
115	Win	89–11–15	Pete August	PTS	10	Jan 9, 1931	Auditorium, Hot Springs, Arkansas, U.S.	
114	Win	88–11–15	Young Jack Thompson	PTS	15	Sep 5, 1930	League Park, Cleveland, Ohio, U.S.	Won NBA, NYSAC, and The Ring welterweight titles
113	Win	87–11–15	David Velasco	TKO	10 (10)	Aug 25, 1930	American Legion Stadium, Little Rock, Arkansas, U.S.	
112	Win	86–11–15	Canada Lee	PTS	10	Aug 8, 1930	Carney Auditorium, Erie, Pennsylvania, U.S.	
111	Win	85–11–15	Billy Alger	PTS	10	Jun 25, 1930	Taylor Bowl, Newburgh Heights, Ohio, U.S.	
110	Loss	84–11–15	Jackie Fields	TKO	4 (12)	Apr 8, 1930	Public Hall, Cleveland, Ohio, U.S.	
109	Win	84–10–15	Denny Burns	PTS	10	Mar 25, 1930	Auditorium, Hot Springs, Arkansas, U.S.	
108	Win	83–10–15	Grover Mallini	PTS	8	Mar 10, 1930	Auditorium, Memphis, Tennessee, U.S.	
107	Win	82–10–15	Louis Andrews	KO	7 (10)	Feb 21, 1930	Auditorium, Hot Springs, Arkansas, U.S.	
106	Win	81–10–15	Bobby LaSalle	PTS	10	Jan 31, 1930	Carney Auditorium, Erie, Pennsylvania, U.S.	
105	Draw	80–10–15	Paul Pirrone	PTS	10	Jan 20, 1930	Public Hall, Cleveland, Ohio, U.S.	
104	Win	80–10–14	Young Jack Thompson	PTS	10	Jan 10, 1930	Olympia Stadium, Detroit, Michigan, U.S.	
103	Win	79–10–14	Clyde Hull	PTS	10	Dec 10, 1929	Auditorium, Hot Springs, Arkansas, U.S.	
102	Win	78–10–14	Joe Reno	PTS	10	Dec 6, 1929	Carney Auditorium, Erie, Pennsylvania, U.S.	
101	Win	77–10–14	Jack Manley	TKO	5 (10)	Dec 2, 1929	Motor Square Garden, Pittsburgh, Pennsylvania, U.S.	
100	Win	76–10–14	Farmer Joe Cooper	TKO	1 (10)	Nov 19, 1929	Public Hall, Cleveland, Ohio, U.S.	
99	Win	75–10–14	Bucky Lawless	KO	7 (10)	Oct 25, 1929	Erie, Pennsylvania, U.S.	
98	Win	74–10–14	Georgie Levine	PTS	10	Oct 14, 1929	Motor Square Garden, Pittsburgh, Pennsylvania, U.S.	
97	Win	73–10–14	Sam Bruce	TKO	9 (10)	Sep 27, 1929	Carney Auditorium, Erie, Pennsylvania, U.S.	
96	Loss	72–10–14	Bucky Lawless	PTS	10	Aug 21, 1929	Taylor Bowl, Newburgh Heights, Ohio, U.S.	
95	Win	72–9–14	Joe Schlocker	TKO	8 (10)	Jul 26, 1929	Outdoor Arena, Erie, Pennsylvania, U.S.	
94	Draw	71–9–14	Andy DiVodi	PTS	10	Apr 26, 1929	Chicago Stadium, Chicago, Illinois, U.S.	
93	Draw	71–9–13	Gorilla Jones	PTS	12	Apr 9, 1929	Public Hall, Cleveland, Ohio, U.S.	
92	Win	71–9–12	Tillie Herman	TKO	2 (10)	Mar 22, 1929	Erie Arena, Erie, Pennsylvania, U.S.	
91	Win	70–9–12	Alf Ros	PTS	10	Mar 11, 1929	Madison Square Garden, New York City, New York, U.S.	
90	Win	69–9–12	Joe Simonich	PTS	10	Feb 18, 1929	White City Arena, Chicago, Illinois, U.S.	
89	Loss	68–9–12	Gorilla Jones	SD	10	Aug 15, 1928	Taylor Bowl, Newburgh Heights, Ohio, U.S.	
88	Win	68–8–12	Willie Harmon	KO	3 (12)	Mar 29, 1928	Public Hall, Cleveland, Ohio, U.S.	
87	Win	67–8–12	Al Van Ryan	NWS	10	Feb 29, 1928	Auditorium, Milwaukee, Wisconsin, U.S.	
86	Win	66–8–12	My Sullivan	UD	10	Nov 25, 1927	Coliseum, Chicago, Illinois, U.S.	
85	Loss	65–8–12	Johnny Indrisano	PTS	10	Oct 7, 1927	Mechanics Building, Boston, Massachusetts, U.S.	
84	Win	65–7–12	Sailor Darden	TKO	5 (10)	Sep 30, 1927	Arena, Syracuse, New York, U.S.	
83	Win	64–7–12	Harry Mason	PTS	10	Aug 18, 1927	Madison Square Garden, New York City, New York, U.S.	
82	Win	63–7–12	Billy Piltz	TKO	9 (12)	Aug 10, 1927	Armory, Toledo, Ohio, U.S.	
81	Win	62–7–12	Sailor Darden	PTS	10	Jul 1, 1927	Erie Arena, Erie, Pennsylvania, U.S.	
80	Win	61–7–12	Joe Simonich	PTS	10	Jun 13, 1927	Braves Field, Boston, Massachusetts, U.S.	
79	Win	60–7–12	Meyer Grace	PTS	10	May 31, 1927	Wrigley Field, Chicago, Illinois, U.S.	
78	Win	59–7–12	Mike Dempsey	KO	4 (10)	May 6, 1927	Erie Arena, Erie, Pennsylvania, U.S.	
77	Win	58–7–12	Arthur Schaekels	KO	6 (10)	Feb 25, 1927	Benjamin Field Arena, Tampa, Florida, U.S.	
76	Win	57–7–12	Arthur Schaekels	KO	2 (10)	Feb 4, 1927	Benjamin Field Arena, Tampa, Florida, U.S.	
75	Draw	56–7–12	Jack Zivic	PTS	12	Oct 25, 1926	Public Hall, Cleveland, Ohio, U.S.	
74	Win	56–7–11	Georgie Levine	NWS	10	Sep 30, 1926	Taylor Bowl, Newburgh Heights, Ohio, U.S.	
73	Draw	55–7–11	Sergeant Sammy Baker	PTS	10	Jul 22, 1926	Madison Square Garden, New York City, New York, U.S.	
72	Win	55–7–10	Pinky Mitchell	NWS	10	Jun 22, 1926	Olympic Arena, Brooklyn, Ohio, U.S.	
71	Win	54–7–10	Paul Doyle	PTS	10	May 28, 1926	Coney Island Stadium, Brooklyn, New York City, New York, U.S.	
70	Win	53–7–10	Joe Simonich	PTS	12	May 19, 1926	Public Hall, Cleveland, Ohio, U.S.	
69	Win	52–7–10	Shuffle Callahan	TKO	11 (12)	Apr 6, 1926	Public Hall, Cleveland, Ohio, U.S.	
68	Loss	51–7–10	Joe Dundee	TKO	5 (10)	Mar 1, 1926	Madison Square Garden, New York City, New York, U.S.	
67	Win	51–6–10	Joe Simonich	PTS	10	Feb 19, 1926	Madison Square Garden, New York City, New York, U.S.	
66	Win	50–6–10	Norman Genet	PTS	10	Feb 4, 1926	Auditorium, Hot Springs, Arkansas, U.S.	
65	Win	49–6–10	Sergeant Sammy Baker	TKO	7 (10)	Jan 1, 1926	Madison Square Garden, New York City, New York, U.S.	
64	Win	48–6–10	Al Walthers	TKO	4 (10)	Nov 18, 1925	Public Hall, Cleveland, Ohio, U.S.	
63	Win	47–6–10	Teddy Easterbrook	NWS	10	Nov 11, 1925	Armory, Toledo, Ohio, U.S.	
62	Win	46–6–10	Let Philbin	KO	5 (10)	Oct 14, 1925	Armory, Toledo, Ohio, U.S.	
61	Win	45–6–10	Al Walthers	TKO	5 (10)	Sep 30, 1925	Olympic Arena, Brooklyn, Ohio, U.S.	
60	Win	44–6–10	Henry Shaw	TKO	3 (10)	Sep 16, 1925	Olympic Arena, Brooklyn, Ohio, U.S.	
59	Draw	43–6–10	Jimmy Jones	NWS	6	Sep 1, 1925	Olympic Arena, Brooklyn, Ohio, U.S.	
58	Win	43–6–9	Mike Dempsey	TKO	5 (6)	Aug 18, 1925	Olympic Arena, Brooklyn, Ohio, U.S.	
57	Win	42–6–9	Dave Forbes	TKO	2 (6)	Aug 4, 1925	Olympic Arena, Brooklyn, Ohio, U.S.	
56	Win	41–6–9	Floyd Hybert	PTS	10	Jul 10, 1925	Erie, Pennsylvania, U.S.	
55	Draw	40–6–9	Jimmy Jones	SD	10	Jun 12, 1925	Erie Arena, Erie, Pennsylvania, U.S.	
54	Win	40–6–8	Frisco McGale	PTS	8	May 7, 1925	Mechanics Building, Boston, Massachusetts, U.S.	
53	Win	39–6–8	Benny Ross	PTS	8	Apr 17, 1925	Mechanics Building, Boston, Massachusetts, U.S.	
52	Win	38–6–8	Bill Brown	KO	8 (10)	Apr 3, 1925	Auditorium, Hot Springs, Arkansas, U.S.	
51	Win	37–6–8	Jack Willis	PTS	10	Feb 17, 1925	Auditorium, Hot Springs, Arkansas, U.S.	
50	Win	36–6–8	Pat Corbett	PTS	10	Jan 30, 1925	Merrie Garden, Oklahoma City, Oklahoma, U.S.	
49	Win	35–6–8	Hamp Brown	KO	3 (10)	Jan 8, 1925	Auditorium, Hot Springs, Arkansas, U.S.	
48	Win	34–6–8	Humbert Brady	PTS	8	Dec 1, 1924	Lyric Theater, Memphis, Tennessee, U.S.	
47	Win	33–6–8	Hamp Brown	PTS	8	Nov 24, 1924	Southern A.C., Memphis, Tennessee, U.S.	
46	Win	32–6–8	Al Knowles	KO	4 (15)	Nov 17, 1924	Coliseum Arena, New Orleans, Louisiana, U.S.	
45	Win	31–6–8	Young Tansey	KO	6 (10)	Oct 13, 1924	Erie, Pennsylvania, U.S.	
44	Win	30–6–8	Jack Oakes	PTS	10	Sep 29, 1924	Park Opera House, Erie, Pennsylvania, U.S.	
43	Win	29–6–8	Johnny Shea	KO	3 (?)	Aug 7, 1924	El Dorado, Texas, U.S.	Unknown date
42	Win	28–6–8	Pinky Mitchell	PTS	15	Jun 2, 1924	Coliseum Arena, New Orleans, Louisiana, U.S.	
41	Win	27–6–8	Jimmy Finley	PTS	10	Apr 5, 1924	Benjamin Field Arena, Tampa, Florida, U.S.	
40	Win	26–6–8	Enrique Ponce de Leon	SD	10	Mar 28, 1924	Benjamin Field Arena, Tampa, Florida, U.S.	
39	Win	25–6–8	Jimmy Cox	PTS	10	Mar 7, 1924	Benjamin Field Arena, Tampa, Florida, U.S.	
38	Win	24–6–8	Frankie Murphy	NWS	10	Jan 15, 1924	Auditorium, Hot Springs, Arkansas, U.S.	
37	Win	23–6–8	Jimmy Cox	PTS	15	Jan 11, 1924	Coliseum Arena, New Orleans, Louisiana, U.S.	
36	Win	22–6–8	Red Hill	PTS	15	Nov 16, 1923	Coliseum Arena, New Orleans, Louisiana, U.S.	
35	Win	21–6–8	Chuck Burns	PTS	8	Nov 5, 1923	Southern A.C., Memphis, Tennessee, U.S.	
34	Win	20–6–8	Johnny Tillman	PTS	15	Sep 28, 1923	Tulane Arena, New Orleans, Louisiana, U.S.	
33	Win	19–6–8	Al Yoakum	KO	13 (15)	Sep 17, 1923	Coliseum Arena, New Orleans, Louisiana, U.S.	
32	Win	18–6–8	Dude Martinez	KO	7 (15)	Jul 23, 1923	Coliseum Arena, New Orleans, Louisiana, U.S.	
31	Win	17–6–8	Billy Brown	NWS	10	Jul 4, 1923	Whittington Park, Hot Springs, Arkansas, U.S.	
30	Win	16–6–8	Grady Franklin	PTS	15	Apr 16, 1923	Pierre Avenue Arena, Shreveport, Louisiana, U.S.	
29	Win	15–6–8	Dummy McKinney	DQ	14 (15)	Apr 2, 1923	Pierre Avenue Arena, Shreveport, Louisiana, U.S.	
28	Loss	14–6–8	Frankie Jones	PTS	8	Feb 19, 1923	Southern A.C., Memphis, Tennessee, U.S.	
27	Loss	14–5–8	Jimmy King	TKO	7 (15)	Jan 24, 1923	Coliseum Arena, New Orleans, Louisiana, U.S.	
26	Win	14–4–8	Tom Storie	NWS	10	Jan 3, 1923	Auditorium, Hot Springs, Arkansas, U.S.	
25	Win	13–4–8	Pat Burke	PTS	15	Nov 15, 1922	Coliseum Arena, New Orleans, Louisiana, U.S.	
24	Loss	12–4–8	Dude Martinez	PTS	10	Sep 18, 1922	Louisiana Auditorium, New Orleans, Louisiana, U.S.	
23	Loss	12–3–8	Al Monroe	PTS	8	Sep 4, 1922	Southern A.C., Memphis, Tennessee, U.S.	
22	Win	12–2–8	Dummy McKinney	PTS	8	Jul 31, 1922	Southern A.C., Memphis, Tennessee, U.S.	
21	Win	11–2–8	Doug Lee	PTS	8	Jul 17, 1922	Southern A.C., Memphis, Tennessee, U.S.	
20	Loss	10–2–8	Jimmy Dunn	PTS	10	Mar 29, 1922	Auditorium, Hot Springs, Arkansas, U.S.	
19	Win	10–1–8	Al Thomas	KO	3 (10)	Mar 18, 1922	Auditorium, Hot Springs, Arkansas, U.S.	
18	Win	9–1–8	Ray Maywood	KO	3 (6)	Mar 8, 1922	Auditorium, Hot Springs, Arkansas, U.S.	
17	Draw	8–1–8	Ray Rivers	NWS	10	Feb 23, 1922	Auditorium, Hot Springs, Arkansas, U.S.	
16	Draw	8–1–7	Voti Plymale	PTS	6	Feb 1, 1922	Hot Springs, Arkansas, U.S.	
15	Win	8–1–6	Sailor Jack	TKO	1 (6)	Jan 24, 1922	Hot Springs, Arkansas, U.S.	
14	Win	7–1–6	Billy Ryan	PTS	4	Nov 16, 1921	Auditorium, Hot Springs, Arkansas, U.S.	
13	Draw	6–1–6	Cliff Foley	PTS	4	Apr 27, 1921	Auditorium, Hot Springs, Arkansas, U.S.	
12	Draw	6–1–5	Cliff Foley	PTS	6	Apr 20, 1921	Auditorium, Hot Springs, Arkansas, U.S.	
11	Draw	6–1–4	Jack Brennan	PTS	4	Mar 30, 1921	Auditorium, Hot Springs, Arkansas, U.S.	
10	Draw	6–1–3	Kid Coster	PTS	6	Mar 7, 1921	Auditorium, Hot Springs, Arkansas, U.S.	
9	Win	6–1–2	Soldier Riley	KO	1 (6)	Mar 4, 1921	Auditorium, Hot Springs, Arkansas, U.S.	
8	Win	5–1–2	Herb Elder	KO	4 (6)	Jan 31, 1921	Auditorium, Hot Springs, Arkansas, U.S.	
7	Win	4–1–2	Kid Hall	PTS	4	Jan 10, 1921	Auditorium, Hot Springs, Arkansas, U.S.	
6	Draw	3–1–2	Frankie Manilla	PTS	6	Dec 7, 1920	Elks Club Room, Hot Springs, Arkansas, U.S.	
5	Win	3–1–1	Sammy Caldwell	KO	3 (?)	Mar 19, 1920	Auditorium, Hot Springs, Arkansas, U.S.	
4	Win	2–1–1	Sammy Caldwell	PTS	4	Mar 11, 1920	Auditorium, Hot Springs, Arkansas, U.S.	
3	Draw	1–1–1	Kid Fort Pitt	PTS	4	Feb 26, 1920	Auditorium, Hot Springs, Arkansas, U.S.	
2	Win	1–1	Kid Cootey	KO	3 (6)	Feb 18, 1920	Auditorium, Hot Springs, Arkansas, U.S.	
1	Loss	0–1	Billy Kennedy	TKO	3 (4)	Feb 9, 1920	Auditorium, Hot Springs, Arkansas, U.S.	

== Titles in boxing ==
=== Major world titles ===
- NYSAC welterweight champion (147 lbs)
- NBA (WBA) welterweight champion (147 lbs)

=== The Ring magazine titles ===
- The Ring welterweight champion (147 lbs)

=== Undisputed titles ===
- Undisputed welterweight champion

Sporting positions
Major world boxing titles
Preceded by Young Jack Thompson	Welterweight world champion September 5, 1930 – April 14, 1931	Succeeded by Young Jack Thompson
