= Pinky Mitchell =

American boxer

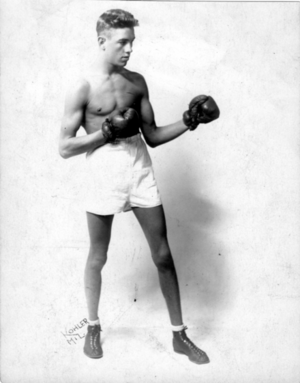

Personal information
- Nickname: Pinky
- Nationality: American
- Born: Myron Herbert Mitchell; January 1, 1899 Milwaukee, Wisconsin, U.S.
- Died: March 11, 1976 (aged 77) Milwaukee, Wisconsin, U.S.
- Weight: light welterweight

Boxing career
- Stance: Orthodox

Boxing record
- Total fights: 83
- Wins: 44
- Win by KO: 10
- Losses: 23
- Draws: 6

Pinky Mitchell was an American boxer who became the first champion in the light welterweight division by receiving the most votes by ballot on November 15, 1922. He held the title until 1926.

In his impressive career he fought Oakland Jimmy Duffy, and champions Rocky Kansas, James Red Herring, Benny Leonard, Lew Tendler, Jack Britton, Mushy Callahan and Joe Dundee.

== Early life ==
Born Myron Mitchell on January 1, 1899, in Milwaukee, Wisconsin, Mitchell was nicknamed Pinky because of his father's statement, on seeing Mitchell in his crib as a baby, that "he's like a little pink rascal." He was a highly praised amateur boxer, and during his amateur days, former lightweight champion Battling Nelson said he was the best-looking prospect he had seen.

== Professional career ==
Mitchell began boxing professionally in 1917. His brother, Richie Mitchell, was also a boxer. Their two styles were quite different, however. Richie was known for all-action bouts while Pinky, according to a later historian, "became a pariah in Milwaukee rings" due to his "lethargic performances" in boxing matches.

On April 11, 1919, Mitchell drew with Harry Shuman, Pacific Coast Lightweight Champion, in Seattle in a four round match. The Milwaukee Sentinel noted that he "was pleased at the treatment he had received in Seattle", though he was accustomed to longer fights.

=== Inaugural world light welterweight champion, 1922 ===
In 1922 Mike Collins, the publisher of a Minneapolis weekly newspaper, the Boxing Blade, created the light welterweight category and asked his readers to vote for the man they felt was the best fighter at 140 pounds. Mitchell won the balloting and was recognized on November 15, 1922, as the first world light welterweight champion. The National Boxing Association (NBA) followed suit and recognized Mitchell as champion.

Mitchell lost to Benny Leonard on May 29, 1923, in a ten round technical knockout in Chicago. Leonard's win was one of many against world champions, though the fight was not a title fight. As Leonard refused to weigh in, neither his world lightweight or Mitchell's world junior welterweight titles were at stake. After a slow first five rounds with few blows, Leonard took the lead in the remaining rounds with the exception of the eighth and ninth. In the eight, Mitchell scored with four rights to the chin of Leonard. Though both boxers scored points, Leonard seemed to have the edge from the fifth. In the tenth, Leonard dropped Pinky to the mat, and upon arising, he knocked him to the mat a second time. The referee called an end to the match, resulting in a technical knockout. Immediately afterwards, Pinkie's brother Ritchie believed a foul had been committed, claiming Leonard had hit Pinky when he was down on one knee on the mat, but the referee disagreed. The Buffalo Courier wrote that Leonard was in the motions of hitting Pinky when he was on one knee, but that the referee waved him away before the blow occurred. Regardless, a fight between Richie and Davey Mitchell, the referee, ensued that ended in a near riot among the spectators. The police put down the protests with their billy clubs, though no arrests were made. Despite the protests, the charity event ended with a win by Leonard and no foul called by the referee against Mitchell in the tenth.

Mitchell defended his title at least six times. One of those defenses, a 1925 fight against James "Red" Herring, was mired in controversy: Herring won by disqualification after Mitchell hit him on the break and claimed the light welterweight championship; the Wisconsin Commission and the NBA both declined to recognize Herring as champion, however, claiming that agreed conditions unobserved during the match meant that the disqualification was not grounds for the title to change hands.

After losing to Harmon, Mitchell then lost a newspaper decision to Willie Harmon in a non-title bout. In an unprecedented move, Mitchell returned his purse to his promoter as redress for his poor performance; it was later revealed that his brother, Billy Mitchell, was in fact his promoter as well as his manager. Following this bout, Harmon claimed Mitchell's NYSAC title after it appeared that Mitchell had temporarily vacated it to fight at welterweight.

=== Loss of title and career decline, September, 1926 ===
His defense against Mushy Callahan saw Mitchell lose his title decisively on September 21, 1926, in a ten-round points decision. Callahan, who began piling up a points lead from the first round, knocked Mitchell to the canvas in the eighth and tenth. Except for the fourth, which was even, and the sixth, where Mitchell led, Callahan took a strong points margin in all the remaining rounds.

After losing to Callahan, Mitchell never won another fight and retired in 1928.

== After boxing ==
After he retired, Mitchell twice ran for sheriff of Milwaukee County, losing both times.

He died on March 11, 1976, in Milwaukee, Wisconsin.

== Professional boxing record ==
All information in this section is derived from BoxRec, unless otherwise stated.

=== Official record ===
83 fights	13 wins	13 losses
By knockout	10	4
By decision	1	7
By disqualification	2	2
Draws	4	
No contests	3	
Newspaper decisions/draws	50	

All newspaper decisions are officially regarded as “no decision” bouts and are not counted in the win/loss/draw column.

No.	Result	Record	Opponent	Type	Round	Date	Location	Notes
83	Loss	13–13–4 (53)	Phil Kaplan	DQ	4 (10)	May 22, 1928	Queensboro Stadium, New York City, New York, U.S.	
82	Loss	13–12–4 (53)	Dick Evans	NWS	10	Mar 29, 1928	Rayen-Wood Auditorium, Youngstown, Ohio, U.S.	
81	NC	13–12–4 (52)	Joe Dundee	NC	6 (10)	Aug 11, 1927	Borchert Field, Milwaukee, Wisconsin, U.S.	Fight stopped for "stalling"
80	Draw	13–12–4 (51)	Clyde Hull	NWS	10	Dec 6, 1926	Fort Worth, Indiana, U.S.	
79	NC	13–12–4 (50)	Tommy White	NC	12	Nov 27, 1926	El Toreo de Cuatro Caminos, Mexico City, Distrito Federal, Mexico	Referee refused to give a decision for "unfair tactics"
78	Loss	13–12–4 (49)	Shuffle Callahan	KO	3 (10)	Nov 5, 1926	Dexter Park Pavilion, Chicago, Illinois, U.S.	
77	Loss	13–11–4 (49)	Mushy Callahan	PTS	10	Sep 21, 1926	Arena, Vernon, California, U.S.	Lost NBA light welterweight title
76	Win	13–10–4 (49)	Georgie Levine	NWS	10	Sep 2, 1926	Idora Park, Youngstown, Ohio, U.S.	
75	Win	13–10–4 (48)	Jimmy Finley	NWS	10	Aug 27, 1926	Borchert Field, Milwaukee, Wisconsin, U.S.	
74	Win	13–10–4 (47)	Georgie Ward	DQ	2 (?)	Aug 20, 1926	Boyle's Thirty Acres, Jersey City, New Jersey, U.S.	
73	Win	12–10–4 (47)	Tommy White	NWS	10	Aug 12, 1926	Borchert Field, Milwaukee, Wisconsin, U.S.	
72	Loss	12–10–4 (46)	Tommy White	PTS	10	Jul 18, 1926	Ciudad Juarez, Chihuahua, Mexico	
71	Loss	12–9–4 (46)	Tommy Freeman	NWS	10	Jun 22, 1926	Olympic Arena, Brooklyn, Ohio, U.S.	
70	Loss	12–9–4 (45)	Jimmy Finley	NWS	10	May 31, 1926	Cedar Rapids, Michigan, U.S.	
69	Win	12–9–4 (44)	Russie LeRoy	NWS	10	Jan 14, 1926	Fargo Auditorium, Fargo, North Dakota, U.S.	
68	Loss	12–9–4 (43)	Bermondsey Billy Wells	NWS	10	Nov 6, 1925	Kenwood Armory, Minneapolis, Minnesota, U.S.	
67	Loss	12–9–4 (42)	Oakland Jimmy Duffy	PTS	10	Sep 30, 1925	Olympic Auditorium, Los Angeles, California, U.S.	
66	Loss	12–8–4 (42)	Joe Dundee	SD	10	Sep 24, 1925	Shibe Park, Philadelphia, Pennsylvania, U.S.	
65	Loss	12–7–4 (42)	Willie Harmon	NWS	10	Aug 14, 1925	State Fair Park, Milwaukee, Wisconsin, U.S.	
64	Win	12–7–4 (41)	Jimmy Gill	NWS	10	May 25, 1925	Janesville, Wisconsin, U.S.	
63	Loss	12–7–4 (40)	Willie Harmon	NWS	12	Apr 29, 1925	Newark Armory, Newark, New Jersey, U.S.	
62	Loss	12–7–4 (39)	James "Red" Herring	DQ	6 (10)	Mar 27, 1925	Arena Gardens, Detroit, Michigan, U.S.	World light welterweight title at stake; Both fighters claimed the title
61	Loss	12–6–4 (39)	Joe Anderson	TKO	7 (10)	Jul 21, 1924	Redland Field, Cincinnati, Ohio, U.S.	
60	Win	12–5–4 (39)	Al Van Ryan	NWS	10	Jun 10, 1924	Mizzou Park, Sioux City, Iowa, U.S.	
59	Loss	12–5–4 (38)	Tommy Freeman	PTS	15	Jun 2, 1924	Coliseum Arena, New Orleans, Louisiana, U.S.	
58	Draw	12–4–4 (38)	Joe Simonich	PTS	10	Apr 25, 1924	Armory, Portland, Oregon, U.S.	
57	Loss	12–4–3 (38)	Oakland Jimmy Duffy	PTS	4	Apr 16, 1924	Auditorium, Oakland, California, U.S.	
56	Win	12–3–3 (38)	Bobby Harper	PTS	10	Apr 8, 1924	Armory, Portland, Oregon, U.S.	
55	Loss	11–3–3 (38)	Lew Tendler	NWS	10	Feb 18, 1924	Auditorium, Milwaukee, Wisconsin, U.S.	
54	Win	11–3–3 (37)	Nate Goldman	DQ	4 (10)	Dec 14, 1923	Auditorium, Milwaukee, Wisconsin, U.S.	
53	Win	10–3–3 (37)	Sid Barbarian	NWS	10	Nov 6, 1923	Detroit, Michigan, U.S.	
52	Win	10–3–3 (36)	Joe Simonich	NWS	10	Oct 11, 1923	Auditorium, Milwaukee, Wisconsin, U.S.	
51	Loss	10–3–3 (35)	Nate Goldman	NWS	8	Jul 9, 1923	Shibe Park, Philadelphia, Pennsylvania, U.S.	
50	Loss	10–3–3 (34)	Benny Leonard	TKO	10 (10)	May 29, 1923	Dexter Park Pavilion, Chicago, Illinois, U.S.	
49	Win	10–2–3 (34)	Tim Droney	KO	5 (12)	May 18, 1923	Jefferson County Armory, Louisville, Kentucky, U.S.	Retained NBA light welterweight title
48	Win	9–2–3 (34)	Harvey Thorpe	NWS	10	Apr 13, 1923	Auditorium, Milwaukee, Wisconsin, U.S.	NBA light welterweight title at stake; (via KO only)
47	Win	9–2–3 (33)	Bobby Barrett	KO	3 (8)	Apr 2, 1923	Arena, Philadelphia, Pennsylvania, U.S.	
46	Win	8–2–3 (33)	Johnny Tillman	NWS	10	Feb 13, 1923	Auditorium, Milwaukee, Wisconsin, U.S.	
45	Win	8–2–3 (32)	Bud Logan	NWS	10	Jan 30, 1923	Auditorium, Milwaukee, Wisconsin, U.S.	NBA light welterweight title at stake; (via KO only)
44	Win	8–2–3 (31)	Tommy O'Brien	NWS	10	Sep 11, 1922	Auditorium, Milwaukee, Wisconsin, U.S.	
43	Draw	8–2–3 (30)	Johnny Tillman	NWS	10	Aug 29, 1922	Monona Park Auditorium, Madison, Wisconsin, U.S.	
42	Win	8–2–3 (29)	Joe Jawson	NWS	10	Aug 15, 1922	Auditorium, Milwaukee, Wisconsin, U.S.	
41	Win	8–2–3 (28)	Billy Burns	KO	5 (?)	Jul 21, 1922	Peoria, Illinois, U.S.	
40	Win	7–2–3 (28)	Billy Burns	KO	5 (?)	Jun 30, 1922	Peoria, Illinois, U.S.	
39	Win	6–2–3 (28)	Frankie Welsh	KO	3 (?)	May 15, 1922	Peoria, Illinois, U.S.	
38	Win	5–2–3 (28)	Pal Moran	NWS	10	Apr 7, 1922	Auditorium, Milwaukee, Wisconsin, U.S.	
37	Loss	5–2–3 (27)	Dave Shade	KO	4 (10)	Mar 27, 1922	Auditorium, Milwaukee, Wisconsin, U.S.	
36	Win	5–1–3 (27)	Willie Doyle	NWS	10	Mar 20, 1922	Muskegon, Michigan, U.S.	
35	Win	5–1–3 (26)	Sid Barbarian	NWS	10	Mar 2, 1922	Auditorium, Milwaukee, Wisconsin, U.S.	
34	Win	5–1–3 (25)	Tommy Neary	NWS	10	Oct 21, 1921	Auditorium, Milwaukee, Wisconsin, U.S.	
33	Win	5–1–3 (24)	Jack Josephs	NWS	10	Sep 30, 1921	Kenwood Armory, Minneapolis, Minnesota, U.S.	
32	Loss	5–1–3 (23)	Neal Allison	PTS	10	Aug 29, 1921	Arena, Boston, Massachusetts, U.S.	
31	Win	5–0–3 (23)	Neal Allison	TKO	9 (10)	Aug 5, 1921	Duluth, Minnesota, U.S.	
30	Win	4–0–3 (23)	Cal Delaney	NWS	10	Apr 19, 1921	Des Moines, Iowa, U.S.	
29	Win	4–0–3 (22)	Patsy Cline	NWS	10	Apr 7, 1921	Auditorium, Milwaukee, Wisconsin, U.S.	
28	Draw	4–0–3 (21)	Willie Jackson	PTS	15	Jan 7, 1921	Madison Square Garden, New York City, New York, U.S.	
27	Win	4–0–2 (21)	Dennis O'Keefe	NWS	10	Jan 1, 1921	Auditorium, Milwaukee, Minnesota, U.S.	
26	Win	4–0–2 (20)	Clonie Tait	NWS	10	Dec 17, 1920	Kenwood Armory, Minneapolis, Minnesota, U.S.	
25	Loss	4–0–2 (19)	Jack Britton	NWS	10	Dec 6, 1920	Auditorium, Milwaukee, Wisconsin, U.S.	
24	Win	4–0–2 (18)	Johnny Noye	KO	4 (?)	Sep 27, 1920	Peoria, Illinois, U.S.	
23	Loss	3–0–2 (18)	Rocky Kansas	NWS	10	Jun 30, 1920	Navin Field, Detroit, Michigan, U.S.	
22	Loss	3–0–2 (17)	Lew Tendler	NWS	10	May 19, 1920	Auditorium, Milwaukee, Wisconsin, U.S.	
21	Win	3–0–2 (16)	Frankie Schoell	NWS	10	Apr 17, 1920	Auditorium, Milwaukee, Wisconsin, U.S.	
20	Win	3–0–2 (15)	Barney Adair	NWS	10	Mar 8, 1920	Empress Theater, Milwaukee, Wisconsin, U.S.	
19	Win	3–0–2 (14)	Joe Welling	NWS	10	Feb 16, 1920	Kenwood Armory, Minneapolis, Minnesota, U.S.	
18	Win	3–0–2 (13)	Cal Delaney	NWS	10	Feb 6, 1920	Auditorium, Saint Paul, Minnesota, U.S.	
17	Win	3–0–2 (12)	Mike Paulson	NWS	10	Dec 15, 1919	Empress Theater, Milwaukee, Wisconsin, U.S.	
16	Win	3–0–2 (11)	Mel Coogan	NWS	10	Nov 24, 1919	Empress Theater, Milwaukee, Wisconsin, U.S.	
15	Win	3–0–2 (10)	Sailor Friedman	NWS	10	Nov 13, 1919	Racine, Wisconsin, U.S.	
14	Win	3–0–2 (9)	Mickey Donley	NWS	10	Oct 21, 1919	Empress Theater, Milwaukee, Wisconsin, U.S.	
13	Win	3–0–2 (8)	Charlie McCarthy	KO	7 (?)	Oct 3, 1919	Empress Theater, Milwaukee, Wisconsin, U.S.	
12	Loss	2–0–2 (8)	Charlie O'Connell	NWS	10	Jun 6, 1919	Royal Moose, Detroit, Michigan, U.S.	
11	Draw	2–0–2 (7)	George Ingle	PTS	12	May 2, 1919	Broadway Theater, Butte, Montana, U.S.	
10	Draw	2–0–1 (7)	Harry Schuman	PTS	4	Apr 11, 1919	Arena, Seattle, Washington, U.S.	
9	Win	2–0 (7)	Johnny Noye	NWS	10	Mar 5, 1919	Empress Theater, Milwaukee, Wisconsin, U.S.	
8	Win	2–0 (6)	Eddie Moy	NWS	10	Jan 27, 1919	Auditorium, Milwaukee, Wisconsin, U.S.	
7	Win	2–0 (5)	Otto Wallace	TKO	9 (10)	Jan 1, 1919	Auditorium, Milwaukee, Wisconsin, U.S.	
6	Win	1–0 (5)	Otto Wallace	NWS	10	Dec 9, 1918	Auditorium, Milwaukee, Wisconsin, U.S.	
5	Win	1–0 (4)	Otto Wallace	NWS	3	Nov 29, 1918	Auditorium, Milwaukee, Wisconsin, U.S.	
4	Win	1–0 (3)	Knockout Gorman	NWS	8	Mar 14, 1918	Illinois Theater, Ottawa, Illinois, U.S.	
3	ND	1–0 (2)	Clint Flynn	ND	10	Mar 3, 1918	United States of America	Exact date and location unknown
2	Loss	1–0 (1)	Johnny Mendelsohn	NWS	10	Jan 24, 1918	Elite Rink, Milwaukee, U.S.	
1	Win	1–0	Joe Homeland	TKO	2 (?)	Nov 6, 1917	Auditorium, Milwaukee, Wisconsin, U.S.	

=== Unofficial record ===
83 fights	48 wins	26 losses
By knockout	10	4
By decision	36	20
By disqualification	2	2
Draws	6	
No contests	3	

Record with the inclusion of newspaper decisions in the win/loss/draw column.

No.	Result	Record	Opponent	Type	Round	Date	Location	Notes
83	Loss	48–26–6 (3)	Phil Kaplan	DQ	4 (10)	May 22, 1928	Queensboro Stadium, New York City, New York, U.S.	
82	Loss	48–25–6 (3)	Dick Evans	NWS	10	Mar 29, 1928	Rayen-Wood Auditorium, Youngstown, Ohio, U.S.	
81	NC	48–24–6 (3)	Joe Dundee	NC	6 (10)	Aug 11, 1927	Borchert Field, Milwaukee, Wisconsin, U.S.	Fight stopped for "stalling"
80	Draw	48–24–6 (2)	Clyde Hull	NWS	10	Dec 6, 1926	Fort Worth, Indiana, U.S.	
79	NC	48–24–5 (2)	Tommy White	NC	12	Nov 27, 1926	El Toreo de Cuatro Caminos, Mexico City, Distrito Federal, Mexico	Referee refused to give a decision for "unfair tactics"
78	Loss	48–24–5 (1)	Shuffle Callahan	KO	3 (10)	Nov 5, 1926	Dexter Park Pavilion, Chicago, Illinois, U.S.	
77	Loss	48–23–5 (1)	Mushy Callahan	PTS	10	Sep 21, 1926	Arena, Vernon, California, U.S.	Lost NBA light welterweight title
76	Win	48–22–5 (1)	Georgie Levine	NWS	10	Sep 2, 1926	Idora Park, Youngstown, Ohio, U.S.	
75	Win	47–22–5 (1)	Jimmy Finley	NWS	10	Aug 27, 1926	Borchert Field, Milwaukee, Wisconsin, U.S.	
74	Win	46–22–5 (1)	Georgie Ward	DQ	2 (?)	Aug 20, 1926	Boyle's Thirty Acres, Jersey City, New Jersey, U.S.	
73	Win	45–22–5 (1)	Tommy White	NWS	10	Aug 12, 1926	Borchert Field, Milwaukee, Wisconsin, U.S.	
72	Loss	44–22–5 (1)	Tommy White	PTS	10	Jul 18, 1926	Ciudad Juarez, Chihuahua, Mexico	
71	Loss	44–21–5 (1)	Tommy Freeman	NWS	10	Jun 22, 1926	Olympic Arena, Brooklyn, Ohio, U.S.	
70	Loss	44–20–5 (1)	Jimmy Finley	NWS	10	May 31, 1926	Cedar Rapids, Michigan, U.S.	
69	Win	44–19–5 (1)	Russie LeRoy	NWS	10	Jan 14, 1926	Fargo Auditorium, Fargo, North Dakota, U.S.	
68	Loss	43–19–5 (1)	Bermondsey Billy Wells	NWS	10	Nov 6, 1925	Kenwood Armory, Minneapolis, Minnesota, U.S.	
67	Loss	43–18–5 (1)	Oakland Jimmy Duffy	PTS	10	Sep 30, 1925	Olympic Auditorium, Los Angeles, California, U.S.	
66	Loss	43–17–5 (1)	Joe Dundee	SD	10	Sep 24, 1925	Shibe Park, Philadelphia, Pennsylvania, U.S.	
65	Loss	43–16–5 (1)	Willie Harmon	NWS	10	Aug 14, 1925	State Fair Park, Milwaukee, Wisconsin, U.S.	
64	Win	43–15–5 (1)	Jimmy Gill	NWS	10	May 25, 1925	Janesville, Wisconsin, U.S.	
63	Loss	42–15–5 (1)	Willie Harmon	NWS	12	Apr 29, 1925	Newark Armory, Newark, New Jersey, U.S.	
62	Loss	42–14–5 (1)	James "Red" Herring	DQ	6 (10)	Mar 27, 1925	Arena Gardens, Detroit, Michigan, U.S.	World light welterweight title at stake; Both fighters claimed the title
61	Loss	42–13–5 (1)	Joe Anderson	TKO	7 (10)	Jul 21, 1924	Redland Field, Cincinnati, Ohio, U.S.	
60	Win	42–12–5 (1)	Al Van Ryan	NWS	10	Jun 10, 1924	Mizzou Park, Sioux City, Iowa, U.S.	
59	Loss	41–12–5 (1)	Tommy Freeman	PTS	15	Jun 2, 1924	Coliseum Arena, New Orleans, Louisiana, U.S.	
58	Draw	41–11–5 (1)	Joe Simonich	PTS	10	Apr 25, 1924	Armory, Portland, Oregon, U.S.	
57	Loss	41–11–4 (1)	Oakland Jimmy Duffy	PTS	4	Apr 16, 1924	Auditorium, Oakland, California, U.S.	
56	Win	41–10–4 (1)	Bobby Harper	PTS	10	Apr 8, 1924	Armory, Portland, Oregon, U.S.	
55	Loss	40–10–4 (1)	Lew Tendler	NWS	10	Feb 18, 1924	Auditorium, Milwaukee, Wisconsin, U.S.	
54	Win	40–9–4 (1)	Nate Goldman	DQ	4 (10)	Dec 14, 1923	Auditorium, Milwaukee, Wisconsin, U.S.	
53	Win	39–9–4 (1)	Sid Barbarian	NWS	10	Nov 6, 1923	Detroit, Michigan, U.S.	
52	Win	38–9–4 (1)	Joe Simonich	NWS	10	Oct 11, 1923	Auditorium, Milwaukee, Wisconsin, U.S.	
51	Loss	37–9–4 (1)	Nate Goldman	NWS	8	Jul 9, 1923	Shibe Park, Philadelphia, Pennsylvania, U.S.	
50	Loss	37–8–4 (1)	Benny Leonard	TKO	10 (10)	May 29, 1923	Dexter Park Pavilion, Chicago, Illinois, U.S.	
49	Win	37–7–4 (1)	Tim Droney	KO	5 (12)	May 18, 1923	Jefferson County Armory, Louisville, Kentucky, U.S.	Retained NBA light welterweight title
48	Win	36–7–4 (1)	Harvey Thorpe	NWS	10	Apr 13, 1923	Auditorium, Milwaukee, Wisconsin, U.S.	NBA light welterweight title at stake; (via KO only)
47	Win	35–7–4 (1)	Bobby Barrett	KO	3 (8)	Apr 2, 1923	Arena, Philadelphia, Pennsylvania, U.S.	
46	Win	34–7–4 (1)	Johnny Tillman	NWS	10	Feb 13, 1923	Auditorium, Milwaukee, Wisconsin, U.S.	
45	Win	33–7–4 (1)	Bud Logan	NWS	10	Jan 30, 1923	Auditorium, Milwaukee, Wisconsin, U.S.	NBA light welterweight title at stake; (via KO only)
44	Win	32–7–4 (1)	Tommy O'Brien	NWS	10	Sep 11, 1922	Auditorium, Milwaukee, Wisconsin, U.S.	
43	Draw	31–7–4 (1)	Johnny Tillman	NWS	10	Aug 29, 1922	Monona Park Auditorium, Madison, Wisconsin, U.S.	
42	Win	31–7–3 (1)	Joe Jawson	NWS	10	Aug 15, 1922	Auditorium, Milwaukee, Wisconsin, U.S.	
41	Win	30–7–3 (1)	Billy Burns	KO	5 (?)	Jul 21, 1922	Peoria, Illinois, U.S.	
40	Win	29–7–3 (1)	Billy Burns	KO	5 (?)	Jun 30, 1922	Peoria, Illinois, U.S.	
39	Win	28–7–3 (1)	Frankie Welsh	KO	3 (?)	May 15, 1922	Peoria, Illinois, U.S.	
38	Win	27–7–3 (1)	Pal Moran	NWS	10	Apr 7, 1922	Auditorium, Milwaukee, Wisconsin, U.S.	
37	Loss	26–7–3 (1)	Dave Shade	KO	4 (10)	Mar 27, 1922	Auditorium, Milwaukee, Wisconsin, U.S.	
36	Win	26–6–3 (1)	Willie Doyle	NWS	10	Mar 20, 1922	Muskegon, Michigan, U.S.	
35	Win	25–6–3 (1)	Sid Barbarian	NWS	10	Mar 2, 1922	Auditorium, Milwaukee, Wisconsin, U.S.	
34	Win	24–6–3 (1)	Tommy Neary	NWS	10	Oct 21, 1921	Auditorium, Milwaukee, Wisconsin, U.S.	
33	Win	23–6–3 (1)	Jack Josephs	NWS	10	Sep 30, 1921	Kenwood Armory, Minneapolis, Minnesota, U.S.	
32	Loss	22–6–3 (1)	Neal Allison	PTS	10	Aug 29, 1921	Arena, Boston, Massachusetts, U.S.	
31	Win	22–5–3 (1)	Neal Allison	TKO	9 (10)	Aug 5, 1921	Duluth, Minnesota, U.S.	
30	Win	21–5–3 (1)	Cal Delaney	NWS	10	Apr 19, 1921	Des Moines, Iowa, U.S.	
29	Win	20–5–3 (1)	Patsy Cline	NWS	10	Apr 7, 1921	Auditorium, Milwaukee, Wisconsin, U.S.	
28	Draw	19–5–3 (1)	Willie Jackson	PTS	15	Jan 7, 1921	Madison Square Garden, New York City, New York, U.S.	
27	Win	19–5–2 (1)	Dennis O'Keefe	NWS	10	Jan 1, 1921	Auditorium, Milwaukee, Minnesota, U.S.	
26	Win	18–5–2 (1)	Clonie Tait	NWS	10	Dec 17, 1920	Kenwood Armory, Minneapolis, Minnesota, U.S.	
25	Loss	17–5–2 (1)	Jack Britton	NWS	10	Dec 6, 1920	Auditorium, Milwaukee, Wisconsin, U.S.	
24	Win	17–4–2 (1)	Johnny Noye	KO	4 (?)	Sep 27, 1920	Peoria, Illinois, U.S.	
23	Loss	16–4–2 (1)	Rocky Kansas	NWS	10	Jun 30, 1920	Navin Field, Detroit, Michigan, U.S.	
22	Loss	16–3–2 (1)	Lew Tendler	NWS	10	May 19, 1920	Auditorium, Milwaukee, Wisconsin, U.S.	
21	Win	16–2–2 (1)	Frankie Schoell	NWS	10	Apr 17, 1920	Auditorium, Milwaukee, Wisconsin, U.S.	
20	Win	15–2–2 (1)	Barney Adair	NWS	10	Mar 8, 1920	Empress Theater, Milwaukee, Wisconsin, U.S.	
19	Win	14–2–2 (1)	Joe Welling	NWS	10	Feb 16, 1920	Kenwood Armory, Minneapolis, Minnesota, U.S.	
18	Win	13–2–2 (1)	Cal Delaney	NWS	10	Feb 6, 1920	Auditorium, Saint Paul, Minnesota, U.S.	
17	Win	12–2–2 (1)	Mike Paulson	NWS	10	Dec 15, 1919	Empress Theater, Milwaukee, Wisconsin, U.S.	
16	Win	11–2–2 (1)	Mel Coogan	NWS	10	Nov 24, 1919	Empress Theater, Milwaukee, Wisconsin, U.S.	
15	Win	10–2–2 (1)	Sailor Friedman	NWS	10	Nov 13, 1919	Racine, Wisconsin, U.S.	
14	Win	9–2–2 (1)	Mickey Donley	NWS	10	Oct 21, 1919	Empress Theater, Milwaukee, Wisconsin, U.S.	
13	Win	8–2–2 (1)	Charlie McCarthy	KO	7 (?)	Oct 3, 1919	Empress Theater, Milwaukee, Wisconsin, U.S.	
12	Loss	7–2–2 (1)	Charlie O'Connell	NWS	10	Jun 6, 1919	Royal Moose, Detroit, Michigan, U.S.	
11	Draw	7–1–2 (1)	George Ingle	PTS	12	May 2, 1919	Broadway Theater, Butte, Montana, U.S.	
10	Draw	7–1–1 (1)	Harry Schuman	PTS	4	Apr 11, 1919	Arena, Seattle, Washington, U.S.	
9	Win	7–1 (1)	Johnny Noye	NWS	10	Mar 5, 1919	Empress Theater, Milwaukee, Wisconsin, U.S.	
8	Win	6–1 (1)	Eddie Moy	NWS	10	Jan 27, 1919	Auditorium, Milwaukee, Wisconsin, U.S.	
7	Win	5–1 (1)	Otto Wallace	TKO	9 (10)	Jan 1, 1919	Auditorium, Milwaukee, Wisconsin, U.S.	
6	Win	4–1 (1)	Otto Wallace	NWS	10	Dec 9, 1918	Auditorium, Milwaukee, Wisconsin, U.S.	
5	Win	3–1 (1)	Otto Wallace	NWS	3	Nov 29, 1918	Auditorium, Milwaukee, Wisconsin, U.S.	
4	Win	2–1 (1)	Knockout Gorman	NWS	8	Mar 14, 1918	Illinois Theater, Ottawa, Illinois, U.S.	
3	ND	1–1 (1)	Clint Flynn	ND	10	Mar 3, 1918	United States of America	Exact date and location unknown
2	Loss	1–1	Johnny Mendelsohn	NWS	10	Jan 24, 1918	Elite Rink, Milwaukee, U.S.	
1	Win	1–0	Joe Homeland	TKO	2 (?)	Nov 6, 1917	Auditorium, Milwaukee, Wisconsin, U.S.	

== See also ==
- List of light welterweight boxing champions

== References and notes ==
Achievements
Inaugural Champion	World Light Welterweight Champion; January 30, 1923 – September 21, 1926	Succeeded by Mushy Callahan
