= Jack Thompson (boxer) =

American boxer (1904–1946)

Young Jack Thompson
Personal information
- Nickname: Young Jack
- Born: Cecil Lewis Thompson; August 17, 1904 Los Angeles, California, U.S.
- Died: April 11, 1946 (aged 41) Los Angeles, California, U.S.
- Height: 5 ft 7 in (1.70 m)
- Weight: Welterweight

Boxing career
- Stance: Orthodox

Boxing record
- Total fights: 122
- Wins: 79
- Win by KO: 44
- Losses: 31
- Draws: 12

Cecil Lewis "Young Jack" Thompson (August 17, 1904 – April 11, 1946) was an American boxer who twice held the Undisputed World Welterweight Championship. He was the first African American to gain the World Welterweight Championship. Born Cecil Lewis Thompson, his name was changed when he decided to become a professional fighter. His father, who was training him, did not think "Cecil" was a fighter's name, so he chose "Jack." To avoid confusion with another fighter named "Jack Thompson," his father decided to use the ring name Young Jack Thompson.

== Boxing career ==
Thompson became a professional fighter in 1922. He reeled off a series of wins, but also had a draw and a loss to future welterweight champion Young Corbett III. In 1928 he fought the welterweight champion, Joe Dundee, in a bout over the welterweight limit so that Dundee's title was not at stake. He knocked Dundee out in the second round.

In 1929 he received a shot at the vacant National Boxing Association title stripped from Dundee. However, Jackie Fields beat him in a ten-round decision for the belt. In 1930 Thompson lost to Jimmy McLarnin but, in his next fight, won the welterweight title by beating his old rival Jackie Fields. After four non-title bouts (including a loss to Young Corbett III), Thompson put his title on the line against Tommy Freeman in September 1930 and lost it by a fifteen-round decision.

Freeman gave Thompson a rematch in April 1931 and Thompson regained the title by a twelfth round technical knockout. Thompson again fought a series of non-title bouts. In one of them he lost to Lou Brouillard. That loss prompted a match at the welterweight limit with Thompson's title at stake. Brouillard once again beat Thompson, ending his second reign as champion.

He continued fighting until he announced his retirement on June 2, 1932. He died on April 11, 1946, of a heart attack in Los Angeles.

== Professional boxing record ==
122 fights	79 wins	31 losses
By knockout	49	3
By decision	30	27
By disqualification	0	1
Draws	12	

No.	Result	Record	Opponent	Type	Round	Date	Location	Notes
122	Win	79–31–12	Leonard Bennett	PTS	6	May 25, 1932	Civic Ice Arena, Seattle, Washington, U.S.	
121	Loss	78–31–12	Charlie Cobb	PTS	10	Mar 25, 1932	Coliseum, San Diego, California, U.S.	
120	Win	78–30–12	Al Trulmans	PTS	10	Mar 11, 1932	Coliseum, San Diego, California, U.S.	
119	Win	77–30–12	Bermondsey Billy Wells	TKO	6 (10)	Mar 4, 1932	Stockton, California, U.S.	
118	Loss	76–30–12	Jimmy Evans	PTS	10	Jan 27, 1932	Auditorium, Oakland, California, U.S.	
117	Loss	76–29–12	Lou Brouillard	UD	15	Oct 23, 1931	Boston, Massachusetts, U.S.	Lost NYSAC, NBA, and The Ring welterweight titles
116	Win	76–28–12	Tommy Jones	KO	3 (10)	Oct 6, 1931	Flint, Michigan, U.S.	
115	Win	75–28–12	Tommy Jones	KO	5 (?)	Sep 5, 1931	Boston, Massachusetts, U.S.	
114	Loss	74–28–12	Lou Brouillard	UD	10	Jul 23, 1931	Boston, Massachusetts, U.S.	
113	Win	74–27–12	Speedball Turner	KO	3 (10)	Jun 19, 1931	Gordon Gale Arena, North Little Rock, Arkansas, U.S.	
112	Win	73–27–12	Pete August	PTS	10	May 27, 1931	Newark, New Jersey, U.S.	
111	Loss	72–27–12	Bucky Lawless	MD	10	May 8, 1931	Chicago, Illinois, U.S. Stadium, Chicago, Illinois, U.S.	
110	Win	72–26–12	Tommy Freeman	TKO	12 (15)	Apr 14, 1931	Public Hall, Cleveland, Ohio, U.S.	Won NYSAC, NBA, and The Ring welterweight titles
109	Win	71–26–12	Larry Kaufman	KO	3 (10)	Mar 19, 1931	Moline, Illinois, U.S. Field House, Moline, Illinois, U.S.	
108	Win	70–26–12	Babe Anderson	KO	9 (10)	Mar 4, 1931	Auditorium, Oakland, California, U.S.	
107	Loss	69–26–12	Tommy Freeman	PTS	15	Sep 5, 1930	League Park, Cleveland, Ohio, U.S.	Lost NYSAC, NBA, and The Ring welterweight titles
106	Loss	69–25–12	Young Corbett III	PTS	10	Jun 4, 1930	Olympic Auditorium, Los Angeles, California, U.S.	
105	Win	69–24–12	Joe Cardoza	KO	3 (10)	Jun 17, 1930	Olympic Auditorium, Los Angeles, California, U.S.	
104	Win	68–24–12	Jimmy Dolan	KO	3 (10)	Jun 9, 1930	Auditorium, Portland, Oregon, U.S.	
103	Win	67–24–12	Bermondsey Billy Wells	KO	2 (10)	Jun 6, 1930	City Auditorium, Omaha, Nebraska, U.S.	
102	Win	66–24–12	Jackie Fields	PTS	15	May 9, 1930	Olympia Stadium, Detroit, Michigan, U.S.	Won NYSAC, NBA, and The Ring welterweight titles
101	Loss	65–24–12	Jimmy McLarnin	UD	10	Mar 28, 1930	Madison Square Garden, New York City, New York, U.S.	
100	Win	65–23–12	Freddie Fitzgerald	MD	10	Mar 1, 1930	Chicago, Illinois, U.S. Stadium, Chicago, Illinois, U.S.	
99	Loss	64–23–12	Thomas "Bucky" Lawless	MD	10	Feb 3, 1930	Convention Hall, Rochester, New York, U.S.	
98	Loss	64–22–12	Tommy Freeman	PTS	10	Jan 10, 1930	Olympia Stadium, Detroit, Michigan, U.S.	
97	Win	64–21–12	Bermondsey Billy Wells	PTS	10	Dec 10, 1929	Auditorium, Minnesapolis, Minnesota, U.S.	
96	Win	63–21–12	Billy White	KO	8 (10)	Nov 18, 1929	Motor Square Garden, Pittsburgh, Pennsylvania, U.S.	
95	Loss	62–21–12	Freddie Fitzgerald	PTS	10	Oct 9, 1929	Arcadia Pavilion, Oakland, California, U.S.	
94	Win	62–20–12	Oakland Jimmy Duffy	TKO	10 (10)	Oct 2, 1929	Auditorium, Oakland, California, U.S.	
93	Win	61–20–12	Oakland Jimmy Duffy	PTS	10	Aug 7, 1929	Arcadia Pavilion, Oakland, California, U.S.	
92	Win	60–20–12	Jimmy Evans	TKO	9 (10)	Jun 24, 1929	State Armory, San Francisco, California, U.S.	
91	Loss	59–20–12	Jackie Fields	UD	10	Mar 25, 1929	Coliseum, Chicago, Illinois, U.S.	For vacant NBA welterweight title
90	Win	59–19–12	Heavy Andrews	PTS	10	Mar 8, 1929	Broadway Auditorium, Buffalo, New York, U.S.	
89	Win	58–19–12	Ham Jenkins	PTS	10	Feb 18, 1929	Convention Hall, Kansas City, Missouri, U.S.	
88	Win	57–19–12	Harry Dudley	TKO	6 (10)	Jan 31, 1929	Kansas City, Missouri, U.S.	
87	Win	56–19–12	James Red Herring	TKO	7 (10)	Jan 25, 1929	Crescent A.C., Buffalo, New York, U.S.	
86	Win	55–19–12	Tommy Red Bragan	KO	4 (10)	Dec 7, 1928	Broadway Auditorium, Buffalo, New York, U.S.	
85	Win	54–19–12	Sam Bruce	KO	10 (10)	Nov 29, 1928	Broadway Auditorium, Buffalo, New York, U.S.	
84	Win	53–19–12	Danny Gordon	TKO	2 (10)	Oct 31, 1928	Hippodrome, Chicago, Illinois, U.S.	
83	Loss	52–19–12	Jackie Fields	PTS	10	Oct 1, 1928	State Armory, San Francisco, California, U.S.	
82	Win	52–18–12	Joe Dundee	TKO	2 (10)	Aug 30, 1928	Comiskey Park, Chicago, Illinois, U.S.	
81	Win	51–18–12	Gene Cardi	TKO	6 (10)	Aug 22, 1928	Taylor Bowl, Newburgh Heights, Ohio, U.S.	
80	Win	50–18–12	Eddie Dempsey	KO	4 (10)	Aug 10, 1928	Shewbridge Field, Chicago, Illinois, U.S.	
79	Win	49–18–12	Russie LeRoy	TKO	5 (10)	Jul 11, 1928	American Giants Baseball Park, Chicago, Illinois, U.S.	
78	Win	48–18–12	Billy Light	PTS	8	Jun 8, 1928	Mills Stadium, Chicago, Illinois, U.S.	
77	Loss	47–18–12	Oakland Jimmy Duffy	DQ	9 (10)	Apr 11, 1928	Auditorium, Oakland, California, U.S.	
76	Win	47–17–12	Johnny O'Donnell	TKO	8 (10)	Mar 16, 1928	Golden Gate Arena, San Francisco, California, U.S.	
75	Loss	46–17–12	Young Corbett III	PTS	10	Feb 13, 1928	State Armory, San Francisco, California, U.S.	
74	Win	46–16–12	Don Fraser	KO	3 (10)	Jan 27, 1928	Golden Gate Arena, San Francisco, California, U.S.	
73	Win	45–16–12	Johnny Adams	TKO	4 (10)	Jan 17, 1928	Olympic Auditorium, Los Angeles, California, U.S.	
72	Win	44–16–12	Charlie Feraci	KO	5 (10)	Jul 22, 1927	Dreamland Rink, San Francisco, California, U.S.	
71	Draw	43–16–12	Young Corbett III	PTS	10	Jun 24, 1927	Dreamland Rink, San Francisco, California, U.S.	
70	Win	43–16–11	Irineo Flores	TKO	2 (10)	Apr 8, 1927	Dreamland Rink, San Francisco, California, U.S.	
69	Win	42–16–11	Harry Brown	PTS	10	Mar 11, 1927	Dreamland Rink, San Francisco, California, U.S.	
68	Win	41–16–11	King Tut	PTS	10	Mar 4, 1927	Dreamland Rink, San Francisco, California, U.S.	
67	Win	40–16–11	Harry Brown	TKO	5 (10)	Feb 18, 1927	Dreamland Rink, San Francisco, California, U.S.	
66	Draw	39–16–11	Tommy Cello	PTS	10	Feb 11, 1927	Dreamland Rink, San Francisco, California, U.S.	
65	Win	39–16–10	Danny McCoy	PTS	6	Jan 27, 1927	Culver City, California, U.S.	
64	Win	38–16–10	Sanford Risdon	PTS	4	Jan 8, 1927	Main Street Athletic Club, Los Angeles, California, U.S.	
63	Loss	37–16–10	Russell Whalen	PTS	10	Nov 23, 1926	Olympic Auditorium, Los Angeles, California, U.S.	
62	Draw	37–15–10	Sailor Teddy Makegon	PTS	10	Nov 12, 1926	Dreamland Rink, San Francisco, California, U.S.	
61	Win	37–15–9	Billy Alger	PTS	10	Nov 5, 1926	Dreamland Rink, San Francisco, California, U.S.	
60	Win	36–15–9	Billy Adams	TKO	5 (10)	Oct 15, 1926	Dreamland Rink, San Francisco, California, U.S.	
59	Win	35–15–9	Jack Silver	TKO	8 (10)	Sep 28, 1926	Olympic Auditorium, Los Angeles, California, U.S.	
58	Win	34–15–9	Charley Pitts	TKO	8 (10)	Sep 14, 1926	Culver City, California, U.S.	
57	Win	33–15–9	Frankie Tierney	KO	7 (8)	Aug 24, 1926	Civic Auditorium, Fresno, California, U.S.	
56	Win	32–15–9	Wild Bill Farrell	PTS	6	Aug 20, 1926	Lawton Springs Arena, Reno, Nevada, U.S.	
55	Win	31–15–9	Frankie Tierney	PTS	8	Jul 28, 1926	El Rio, California, U.S.	
54	Win	30–15–9	Harry Whybrow	KO	2 (6)	Jul 24, 1926	Ascot Park, Los Angeles, California, U.S.	
53	Win	29–15–9	Joe Allesio	KO	3 (6)	Jun 29, 1926	Coliseum, San Diego, California, U.S.	
52	Win	28–15–9	Billy McCann	TKO	8 (10)	Jun 18, 1926	Coliseum, San Diego, California, U.S.	
51	Win	27–15–9	Bus Bairie	PTS	6	May 28, 1926	Coliseum, San Diego, California, U.S.	
50	Win	26–15–9	Pete Druid	KO	1 (?)	May 25, 1926	Culver City, California, U.S.	
49	Win	25–15–9	Ad Ruiz	PTS	6	May 21, 1926	Coliseum, San Diego, California, U.S.	
48	Loss	24–15–9	Young Corbett III	PTS	6	May 18, 1926	Civic Auditorium, Fresno, California, U.S.	
47	Loss	24–14–9	Young Sam Langford	PTS	6	Mar 31, 1926	Olympic Auditorium, Los Angeles, California, U.S.	
46	Draw	24–13–9	Joe Layman	PTS	6	Mar 9, 1926	Arena, Vernon, California, U.S.	
45	Win	24–13–8	Boby Ertle	TKO	1 (?)	Feb 10, 1926	Auditorium, Oakland, California, U.S.	
44	Win	23–13–8	Baby Pete	PTS	6	Jan 22, 1926	Coliseum, San Diego, California, U.S.	
43	Win	22–13–8	Tarzan Joe Lopez	KO	3 (?)	Jan 14, 1926	Armory, Pasadena, California, U.S.	
42	Draw	21–13–8	Billy Springfield	PTS	6	Dec 22, 1925	Civic Auditorium, Fresno, California, U.S.	
41	Win	21–13–7	Billy Springfield	PTS	10	Oct 30, 1925	River Street Arena, Santa Cruz, California, U.S.	
40	Loss	20–13–7	Harry Scott	PTS	6	Oct 7, 1925	Auditorium, Oakland, California, U.S.	
39	Draw	20–12–7	Young Harry Willis	PTS	10	Jul 24, 1925	Coliseum, San Diego, California, U.S.	
38	Loss	20–12–6	Charlie Feraci	PTS	10	May 1, 1925	Coliseum, San Diego, California, U.S.	
37	Win	20–11–6	John Battling Ward	KO	6 (10)	Apr 13, 1925	Assembly Athletic Club, Los Angeles, California, U.S.	
36	Win	19–11–6	John Battling Ward	PTS	6	Apr 3, 1925	Coliseum, San Diego, California, U.S.	
35	Draw	18–11–6	Kid Bello	PTS	6	Mar 20, 1925	Coliseum, San Diego, California, U.S.	
34	Win	18–11–5	Sailor Joe Carter	KO	1 (6)	Mar 13, 1925	Coliseum, San Diego, California, U.S.	
33	Win	17–11–5	Joe Burns	PTS	10	Mar 11, 1925	Assembly Athletic Club, Los Angeles, California, U.S.	
32	Win	16–11–5	Eddie Sylvester	KO	3 (10)	Feb 18, 1925	Assembly Athletic Club, Los Angeles, California, U.S.	
31	Win	15–11–5	Joe Martinez	TKO	7 (10)	Feb 4, 1925	Assembly Athletic Club, Los Angeles, California, U.S.	
30	Win	14–11–5	Eddie Eagleton	KO	3 (6)	Jan 28, 1925	Assembly Athletic Club, Los Angeles, California, U.S.	
29	Win	13–11–5	Eddie Cortez	KO	1 (6)	Jan 21, 1925	Assembly Athletic Club, Los Angeles, California, U.S.	
28	Win	12–11–5	Jimmy Brown	KO	2 (4)	Dec 17, 1924	Assembly Athletic Club, Los Angeles, California, U.S.	
27	Win	11–11–5	Harry Young Cumpston	PTS	4	Dec 10, 1924	Assembly Athletic Club, Los Angeles, California, U.S.	
26	Win	10–11–5	Garcia	KO	1 (4)	Dec 3, 1924	Assembly Athletic Club, Los Angeles, California, U.S.	
25	Win	9–11–5	Garcia	PTS	4	Nov 26, 1924	Assembly Athletic Club, Los Angeles, California, U.S.	
24	Loss	8–11–5	Dick Hoppe	KO	2 (4)	Nov 20, 1924	Pasadena, California, U.S.	
23	Loss	8–10–5	Tommy O'Leary	PTS	4	Oct 21, 1924	L Street Arena, Sacramento, California, U.S.	
22	Win	8–9–5	Young Riley	PTS	4	Sep 12, 1924	L Street Arena, Sacramento, California, U.S.	
21	Loss	7–9–5	Min Minnich	PTS	4	Aug 19, 1924	East Side Arena, San Jose, California, U.S.	
20	Draw	7–8–5	Henry Falegano	PTS	4	Aug 7, 1924	West Side Arena, San Jose, California, U.S.	
19	Loss	7–8–4	Jack Davis	PTS	4	Jun 29, 1924	Livermore, California, U.S.	
18	Win	7–7–4	Pete Francis	PTS	4	Jun 15, 1924	Livermore, California, U.S.	
17	Draw	6–7–4	Pete Francis	PTS	4	May 29, 1924	San Jose, California, U.S.	
16	Loss	6–7–3	George Spencer	PTS	4	Apr 24, 1924	Floral A.C., San Mateo, California, U.S.	
15	Loss	6–6–3	Young Terry	PTS	4	Apr 22, 1924	Floral A.C., San Mateo, California, U.S.	
14	Loss	6–5–3	George Spencer	PTS	4	Apr 10, 1924	Floral A.C., San Mateo, California, U.S.	
13	Win	6–4–3	Sailor George Brandon	PTS	4	Mar 27, 1924	Floral A.C., San Mateo, California, U.S.	
12	Draw	5–4–3	Young Stanley Ketchell	PTS	4	Jan 30, 1924	Venice, California, U.S.	
11	Draw	5–4–2	Hank Gatton	PTS	4	Jan 17, 1924	Chief Petty Officers Club, San Pedro, California, U.S.	
10	Loss	5–4–1	George Spencer	PTS	4	Jan 10, 1924	East Side Arena, San Jose, California, U.S.	
9	Win	5–3–1	Filipino Kid Martin	KO	2 (4)	Jan 4, 1924	Dreamland Rink, San Francisco, California, U.S.	
8	Win	4–3–1	Manuel Kid Robinson	PTS	4	Dec 20, 1923	East Side Arena, San Jose, California, U.S.	
7	Win	3–3–1	Joe Powell	KO	2 (4)	Dec 6, 1923	San Jose, California, U.S.	
6	Win	2–3–1	Paul Duarte	PTS	4	Oct 23, 1923	Arena, Vernon, California, U.S.	
5	Loss	1–3–1	Hank Gatton	PTS	4	Oct 2, 1923	Arena, Vernon, California, U.S.	
4	Draw	1–2–1	Alfred Ells	PTS	4	Sep 18, 1923	Arena, Vernon, California, U.S.	
3	Loss	1–2	Eddie Morris	KO	2 (4)	Feb 23, 1923	L Street Arena, Sacramento, California, U.S.	
2	Loss	1–1	Billy Springfield	KO	2 (4)	Feb 13, 1923	Arcadia Pavilion, San Francisco, California, U.S.	
1	Win	1–0	Bud Kelly	KO	2 (4)	Nov 29, 1922	Association Club, San Francisco, California, U.S.	

== Titles in boxing ==
=== Major world titles ===
- NYSAC welterweight champion (147 lbs) (2×)
- NBA (WBA) welterweight champion (147 lbs) (2×)

=== The Ring magazine titles ===
- The Ring welterweight champion (147 lbs) (2×)

=== Undisputed titles ===
- Undisputed welterweight champion (2×)

== See also ==
- List of welterweight boxing champions

Achievements
Preceded by Jackie Fields	Welterweight boxing champion May 9, 1930–Sept 5, 1930	Succeeded by Tommy Freeman
Preceded by Tommy Freeman	Welterweight boxing champion April 14, 1931–Oct 23, 1931	Succeeded by Lou Brouillard
