= Georgie Levine =

American boxer (1901–1993)

Personal information
- Nickname: George Lavigne
- Nationality: American
- Born: April 12, 1901 Russia
- Died: December 25, 1993 (aged 92) Los Angeles, California, U.S.
- Height: 5 ft 8 in (1.73 m)
- Weight: Welterweight

Boxing career
- Reach: 5 ft 10 in (1.78 m)
- Stance: Orthodox

Boxing record
- Total fights: 107
- Wins: 59
- Win by KO: 6
- Losses: 29
- Draws: 13
- No contests: 6

Georgie Levine (April 12, 1901 – December 25, 1993) was a Jewish, New York based, top-rated welterweight boxer in the 1920s. He was trained for much of his career by Izzy Sarber.

== Early life and career ==
Levine was born in Russia on April 12, 1901, but grew up with his family on New York's East side near Brooklyn. According to Levine, he first began boxing around sixteen.

In a win that spotlighted his rise as a recognized world welterweight contender, Levine defeated Tommy Milligan on March 3, 1926 in twelve rounds at Brooklyn's Broadway Arena on March 3, 1926. Levine led throughout the battle, punishing his Irish opponent in the late rounds with short jabs from his right. Milligan was forced to take a defensive posture and was unable to land a telling blow in the match.

Highly rated welterweight contender Jack Zivic fell to Levine in a ten round points decision, the main bout at Motor Square Garden in Pittsburgh on April 12, 1926. In one of his most impressive early victories, Levine scored well with straight lefts and rights to the head which slowed Zivic throughout the match. Levine took the first eight rounds convincingly, though Zivic took the final three in a furious rally as Levine tired. Levine nullified Zivic's left hook with effective blocking, and staged a multi-faceted defense, sidestepping many of Zivic's rushes and swiftly countering.

Levine had a match with reigning world welterweight champion Joe Dundee at New York's Madison Square Garden on May 7, 1926 that resulted in a ten round loss by points decision. Levine was a half pound over the welterweight limit, or the bout could have been fought as a world welterweight title match. Dundee took the decision largely through superior infighting and frequent and vicious blows to the body. A blow from Levine dislodged a gold bridge from the mouth of Dundee in the third round. There were no knockdowns in the well matched contest, with both boxers mixing frequently in an action-packed ten rounds.

== Attempt at world welterweight championship, 1926 ==
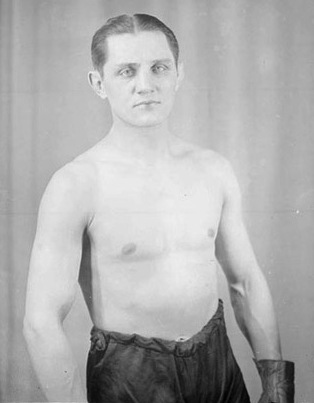
Champion Pete Latzo

On July 9, 1926, Levine challenged reigning champion Pete Latzo for the world welterweight title at New York's famed Polo Grounds. Levine may have been behind on points in the close early rounds, when he landed a low blow on Latzo who sunk to the canvas, causing the referee to abruptly end the bout by disqualification, 1:28 into the fourth round. The call caused some controversy in the crowd. Levine claimed in an interviews years later to have earned $25,000 for the fight, which attracted 22,000, one of his largest audiences. He had previously lost to Latzo in Brooklyn on June 16, 1925 in a ten round points decision. Through 1929, he remained a top rated welterweight contender.

On September 2, 1926, Levine fell to reigning world light welterweight champion Pinky Mitchell in a ten round newspaper decision of the Youngstown Vindicator, in Youngstown, Ohio. Mitchell scored two knockdowns over his Brooklyn-based opponent, who was groggy in the final round from a series of left hooks. In the sixth, Mitchell brought swelling to Levine's left eye, though the match featured give and take from both boxers throughout. The Associated Press wrote that Levine was decisively defeated.

Levine lost to the highly accomplished former world welterweight champion Jack Britton in a ten round points decision on August 29, 1927 at Dexter Park Arena in Woodhaven, Queens, New York. Though he was boxing at the advanced age of 40, Britton's ring experience seemed to prove the deciding factor in attaining his points margin, as he was able to score while still conserving energy. There were no knockdowns in the bout, as both boxers demonstrated an effective defense.

Levine defeated Jewish boxer and Baltimore native Sylvan Bass, a well rated welterweight, on April 23, 1928 in a twelve round points decision at the Armory in Baltimore. Bass appeared sluggish though most of the match but took the eighth with lefts to the stomach and hard rights to the ribs. Levine dominated through most of the bout, driving Bass to the ropes where he landed jabs and flurries of punches, with Bass futilely attempting to block, but rarely able to counter. There were no knockdowns, but the sixth saw Levine punching Bass groggy with lefts and rights both in and out of clinches.

Fighting as welterweights, Izzy Grove defeated Levine on September 10, 1928, in a third round disqualification, at Dexter Park Arena in Queens. Only a month earlier on August 8, Levine had knocked out Grove 1:01 into the ninth round before a large audience at New York's Ebbetts Field, home of the Yankees. At the end of the bout Grove dropped to the canvas and claimed he was fouled, but the referee ruled the blow was fair and counted him out.

== Career ending eye injury, 1928 ==
During a bout around 1928, Levine suffered an eye injury which continued to deteriorate. He secretly had the eye removed, never telling the Boxing Commission and continuing his boxing career. He claimed to have passed the pre-fight physical examinations before each fight by memorizing the eye chart.

He initially retired from boxing after a ten round loss to future welterweight champion Tommy Freeman in a ten round points decision on October 14, 1929 at Motor Square Garden in Pittsburgh. The exceptional Freeman, a rising star, boxed elegantly conserving his energy to last the full ten rounds, and slipped most of the punches of Levine while landing his own with accuracy. He appeared to fight without dealing unnecessary punishment to Levine, whom he easily outpointed.

Levine came out of retirement from competitive boxing on September 24, 1932 to box Charlie Rauch, winning in a six round points decision, the feature bout at Ridgewood Grove Arena in Brooklyn. It was his last known professional match. In a late life interview, he admitted that his previous eye injury was a major determinant in his decision to retire.

== Life outside boxing ==
Levine may have appeared in a few movies around 1924, during his initial stint boxing in Los Angeles and San Francisco. In his career he would fight a total of 39 times in California.

After his retirement from boxing, Levine moved to Los Angeles, and purchased two taverns that he operated continuously for the next thirty years.

At 90, in 1991, he was still active in weekly meetings of the Golden State Boxers and Wrestler's Association in Hollywood, and claimed to exercise daily.

Georgie Levine died on December 25, 1993, of congestive heart failure in Los Angeles. He was survived by two sons, Eugene and Steven, and a daughter, Arlette.
