= Spike Webb =

American boxer (1889–1963)

- At the 1924 Paris Olympics

Personal information
- Born: Hamilton Murrel Webb; April 12, 1889 Baltimore, Maryland USA
- Died: July 2, 1963 (aged 74) Annapolis, Maryland USA
- Height: 5 ft 4.8 in (1.65 m)
- Weight: Featherweight, fought from 125-130 lb

Boxing career
- Stance: Southpaw, left-handed

Boxing record
- Total fights: Pro-boxing Career: 115
- Wins: Naval Academy Coach 1919-54; Undefeated 1921-32; Record 1920-42: 93-14-8; Honors - 6 Inter-collegiate titles US Olympic Coach 1920-32; Honors - Team Title '20, '24, '32; Medals: 7 Gold, 4 Silver, 5 Bronze

Spike Webb, born Hamilton Murrel Webb (April 12, 1889 – July 2, 1963), was an American boxer who became an Olympic boxing coach for four successful American Olympic teams from 1920 to 1932, while simultaneously serving the initial and longest term as head boxing coach for the United States Naval Academy from 1919 to 1954. During his tenure, he was considered by sports historians to be the most successful college and Olympic boxing coach of his era.

== Early life ==
Webb was born on April 2, 1889, to George W. and Mary E. Webb in the Hamden-Woodberry section of Baltimore, Maryland. He began professional boxing at 14, at his city's Eureka Athletic Club. His hometown paper, the Baltimore Sun, wrote that in one of his early fights as a scrawny featherweight he knocked out his opponent "Battling Kennedy" on March 17, 1916, only a few seconds after he had accidentally misplaced a blow and knocked out the referee. One Baltimore source wrote that before the War, he once met future World feather champion Johnny Kilbane in a close non-title match. According to one source, he boxed professionally only six years, retiring in 1910, fighting close to 115 fights and acquiring an impressive record with only a handful of losses, but few reliable records remain of his professional fights.

== Coaching career ==
He received a three-year Polytechnical education at night school, than began his coaching career as the athletic director of Baltimore's Westside Center from 1913 to 1917, where he trained thousands of young men in boxing, wrestling, football, baseball, basketball, soccer, track and field. As a player, he enjoyed football, and pitching baseball.

=== American Expeditionary Force (AEF) team Coach, 1918-19 ===
In Army, 1918

He followed several of the fighters he'd been with into signing with the 29th Division of the Maryland National Guard in 1917 and continued his coaching career in WWI rising to the rank of Sergeant by 1919 coaching National Guard boxers at Camp McClellan, a large army mobilization camp outside Anniston, Alabama. While serving in the Army in France, he fought reigning European featherweight champion, Frenchman Charles Ledoux, in a rugged bout to a six-round draw in an exhibition in an underground canteen in Verdun, France on October 4, 1918. During the same period he had an exhibition with the future French light heavyweight champion Georges Carpentier.

Towards the end of the war, he Captained and trained the highly successful American Expeditionary Force (AEF) boxing team. On January 14, 1919, the Blue and Grey team of the Maryland National Guard 29th Division, coached by Webb, won every bout in a contest arranged for them with French fighters in Paris. In a telegram sent the following morning to the Divisional commander, Webb summed up the day, stating his team had "Nine fights, nine victories, five knockouts." When the Division left Paris, Webb was picked to stay behind and coach the American team in the Paris Inter-Allied Games Competition. Coaching the team to a win in the Inter-Allied Games finals at the Cirque-de-Paris on July 26, 1919, Webb was the subject of strong praise from the American Commander General Pershing, who watched the competition, for steering the team to victory. Webb was known for introducing AEF team member Gene Tunney, future world heavyweight champion, to the inside right hook. A boxer starts the blow with the elbow of the right arm close to the side of the body, than shoots that arm straight out, finally turning the wrist inward just before impact. Outstanding members of the team included Olympian Eddie Eagan and Bob Martin. Tunney, who won the light heavyweight championship for the American AEF team, later said, "Spike Webb ranks as one of the two or three top men in boxing for all time, either professional or amateur. He is an institution. The regard in which boxing holds him is a result of his way of life. He never asked anything for himself. He was always giving to others."

=== US Naval Academy coach, 1919-54 ===
Webb, early career, 1920

Immediately after his service in WWI, he became an associate professor and boxing coach at the United States Naval Academy, Annapolis, Maryland, and served for 35 years until his retirement on June 30, 1954. During his career as a coach, he amassed a record of wins and titles that many boxing historians consider unsurpassed in his era. His Academy teams at Annapolis won a total of six intercollegiate boxing titles, where they were undefeated for 12 seasons from 1921 to 1932, and won 26 individual crowns. His naval team record for the period between 1919 and 1941 was 93 wins, 14 losses, and 8 ties.

With a few interruptions, boxing techniques continued to be taught at the Naval Academy after 1941 but as an intramural and not as a competitive intercollegiate sport and Webb coached many of the intramural teams. Boxing was dropped as an Inter-collegiate sport at Navy in 1941 due to a loss of recruits due to WWII. It became an inter-collegiate sport again in 1983 under Coach Emerson Smith who carefully researched to determine the safest available amateur headgear and gloves for competitions. An Annual Brigade Boxing Championship continues today for Navy Mid-shipman, featuring head gear and three-round matches. The winner receives the Tony Rubino Trophy, named in honor of Webb's replacement as coach in 1954. Considered the "Father of Navy Boxing", the "Spike Webb Outstanding Boxer Award" has been given to the outstanding Navy boxer each year since Webb's retirement in 1954.

In the same year he began coaching the Navy team in 1919, Webb started Boxing Juniors, a boxing club for the children of officers. Ages ranged from 2 to 12, and a Juniors Championship tournament was held each of the 35 years Webb was Navy head coach. Many of these children grew up to be high ranking Admirals and captains. His work with young boxers included coaching several championship teams for the New York Golden Gloves competitions, including New York's 1940 and 1941 Inter-City competitions.

During his career with the Naval Academy, Webb also coached track for the Baltimore Cross Country team, a sport he had coached in his youth in Baltimore.

=== US Olympic coach, 1920-32 ===
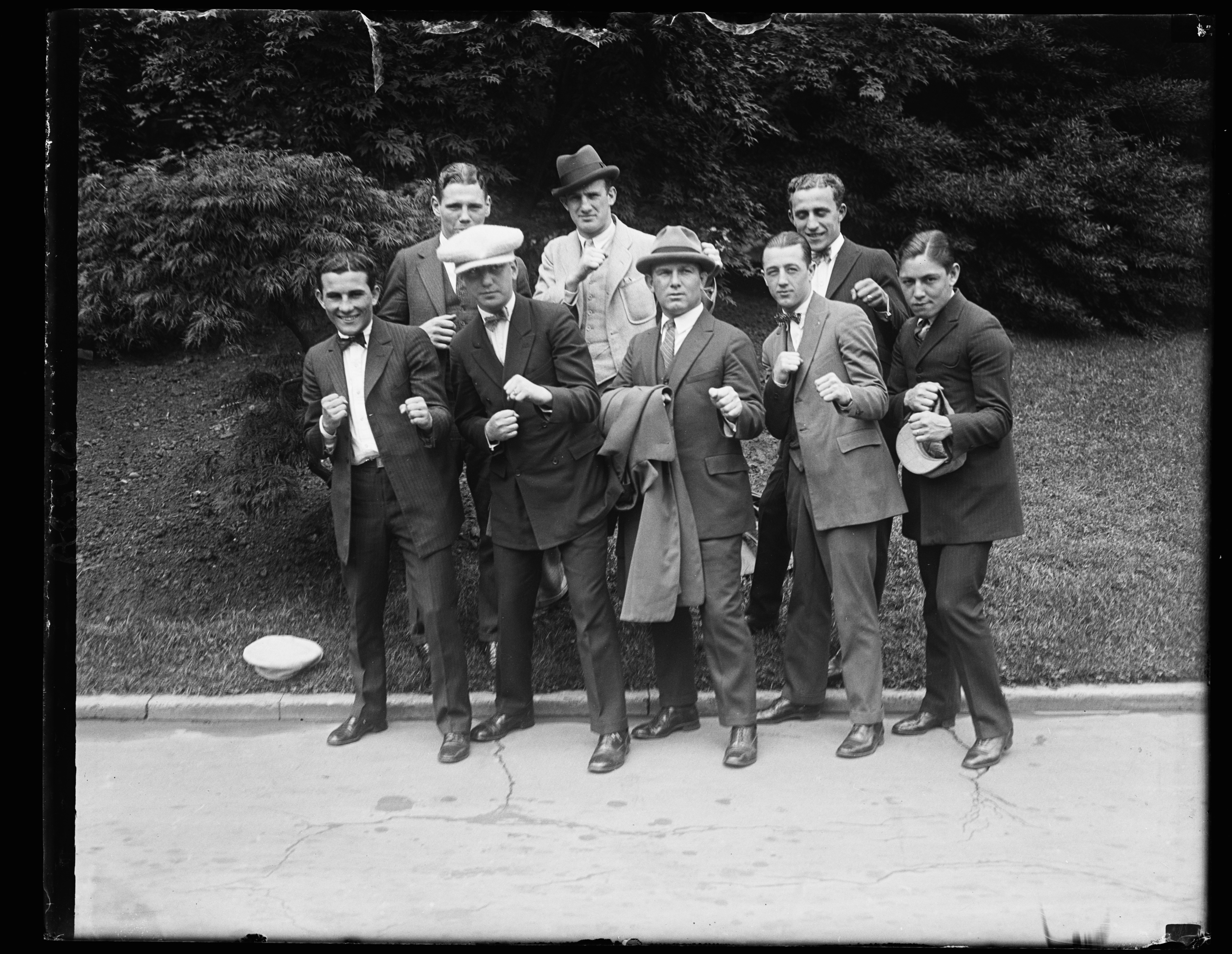
Members of the U.S. 1924 Olympic Boxing Team call at White House before sailing to Europe on June 14. Front row, lft. to rt.- Fidel La Barba, Jack Fields, "Spike" Webb

In 1919, Webb was selected as head coach for the American Olympic boxing team from among 100 candidates. As coach, in 1920, 1924, 1928, and 1932, he led the team to 3 overall team titles, and seven individual gold medals. Finding success in his first year as Olympic Coach at the 1920 Antwerp Summer Olympics, his boxers received 4 medals, with golds won by Frankie Genaro, Samuel Mosberg, and Eddie Eagan. In the 1924 Paris Olympics, Webb said he was proud he had picked Jackie Fields over the protests of other coaches, despite his being beaten in his second Olympic trials elimination round. Proven correct in his evaluation, Fields took the gold medal in Paris, and later became World welterweight champion. Fidel LaBarba, whom Webb considered his most intelligent protege, won the other gold. His 1928 Amsterdam Olympic boxing team was the only one of the four he coached that failed to win the team medal, but won two Silvers and a Bronze. At the 1932 Los Angeles Olympics, the team once again won the team title, taking two gold and three bronze medals.

While they were Olympians, Webb coached future champions Jackie Fields, Fidel LaBarba, and Frankie Genaro. He trained Eddie Saunders at Annapolis, before he became the 1952 Olympic Gold medalist at Helsinki. Web also coached and worked with champions Lou Salica, Ken Overlin, Sugar Ray Robinson, Petey Sarron, and Johnny "Kid" Williams.

After retiring as their boxing coach, he received a pension from the US Naval Academy, and at the bequest of the Israeli government spent six months installing boxing in their Athletic programs and schools, and training their Olympic Boxing team.

He experienced advancing deafness as he aged, which he claimed was the result of both the pounding he received in the ring, and the anti-aircraft shellfire he endured fighting in Verdun, France in WWI. He died after a short illness, possibly a stroke, at the age of 74 at Anne Arundel General Hospital in Annapolis, Maryland, on July 2, 1963. After a service at the Naval Academy Chapel, he was buried in their cemetery, at its highest point atop a hill. Webb was inducted into the Maryland State Hall of Fame, an athletic honor, in 1974.

== See also ==
- Boxing at the 1920 Summer Olympics
- Boxing at the 1924 Summer Olympics
- Boxing at the 1928 Summer Olympics
- Boxing at the 1932 Summer Olympics
