= Vince Dundee =

American boxer (1907–1949)

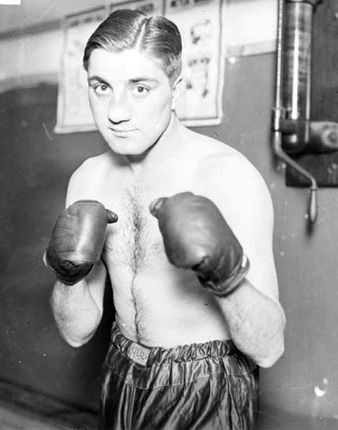

Personal information
- Nationality: American
- Born: Vincenzo Lazzara; October 22, 1907 Palermo, Sicily, Italy
- Died: July 27, 1949 (aged 41) Glendale, California, U.S.
- Height: 5 ft 8 in (1.73 m)
- Weight: Lightweight; Welterweight; Middleweight

Boxing career
- Reach: 71 in (180 cm)
- Stance: Orthodox

Boxing record
- Total fights: 158
- Wins: 122
- Win by KO: 29
- Losses: 21
- Draws: 14
- No contests: 1

Vince Dundee (October 22, 1907 – July 27, 1949), born Vincenzo Lazzara in Sicily, became the New York State Athletic Commission world middleweight champion when he defeated reigning champion Lou Brouillard on October 30, 1933. His title was also recognized by the National Boxing Association (NBA). He was the younger brother of former welterweight world champion of boxing, Joe Dundee.

== Early life ==
The Lazzara family emigrated from Sicily to the United States and lived in Baltimore. Following in the footsteps of his older brother Joe, who was a world welterweight champion, Vince changed his name to Dundee and became a professional boxer. A third brother, Anthony, fought under the name "Battling Dundee", but never contended for a title.

== Professional career ==
Dundee began his formal professional boxing career in 1927. He lived and boxed for a period in Belleville, New Jersey, where he was managed by Max Waxman, who also managed brother Joe. Vince was trained by Benny Benjamin, another Baltimore resident, and later by Heinie Blaustein.

Willie Harmon fell to Dundee on August 1, 1927, in a ten-round points decision in Baltimore.

Dundee first lost to reigning world welterweight champion, the incomparable Jackie Fields on October 2, 1929, in a ten-round points decision before a crowd of 7,000 in Chicago. In a somewhat close and furiously fought contest, Fields employed the cleaner punching and scored a knockdown with a right cross in the sixth to gain the decision of the judges. The remainder of the bout saw a furious and constant exchange of blows as both boxers worked for a knockout. In their second meeting, Fields on January 24, 1930, Fields won more convincingly in a ten-round unanimous decision at Chicago Stadium. Fields floored Dundee four times in the third, the first three times for eight counts, and a brief two count when Dundee was saved by the closing bell. The young Dundee recovered in the fifth round, and appeared to have even taken the tenth. The fighting was constant with rallies in seven of the ten rounds, each ending in exhausted clinches.

During several important boxing bouts in Europe, Marcel Thil, French welterweight champion decisively defeated Dundee on March 12, 1931, in a twelve-round unanimous decision before an impressive crowd of 14,000. After an even first round, the faster Thil took the next three, and held his own gaining additional points in the remaining rounds. Two weeks later, Dundee drew with British welterweight champion Jack Hood in ten rounds in White City, England. The bout was slow and calculated, though Dundee scored occasionally against the mid-section, and Hood connected with long lefts to Dundee's head.

Dundee defeated future NBA world middleweight champion Solly Krieger on October 16, 1931, in an eighth-round technical knockout at Madison Square Garden, though there was no great degree of crowd interest in the semi-final bout.

Dundee drew with Ben Jeby to on March 17, 1933, in his first attempt at the New York State Athletic Commission's (NYSAC) world middleweight title in fifteen rounds before 11,000 at Madison Square Garden. Ed Hughes of the Brooklyn Daily Eagle wrote that Dundee clearly deserved the decision and believed he won eleven of the fifteen rounds, with only three to Jeby, but one judge ruled for Jeby, and the referee ruled for a draw. Hughes wrote that from the third round on, Dundee connected with left jabs with enough frequency to gain the decision, though Jeby likely took the fifth and seventh. In a rough bout, Jeby's face looked badly beaten. The Associated Press, agreeing that Dundee deserved the decision, gave him nine rounds with Jeby four and two even. Dundee blocked so well from the sixth to the final round, that Jeby landed very few solid punches.

=== Taking the world middleweight title, October, 1933 ===
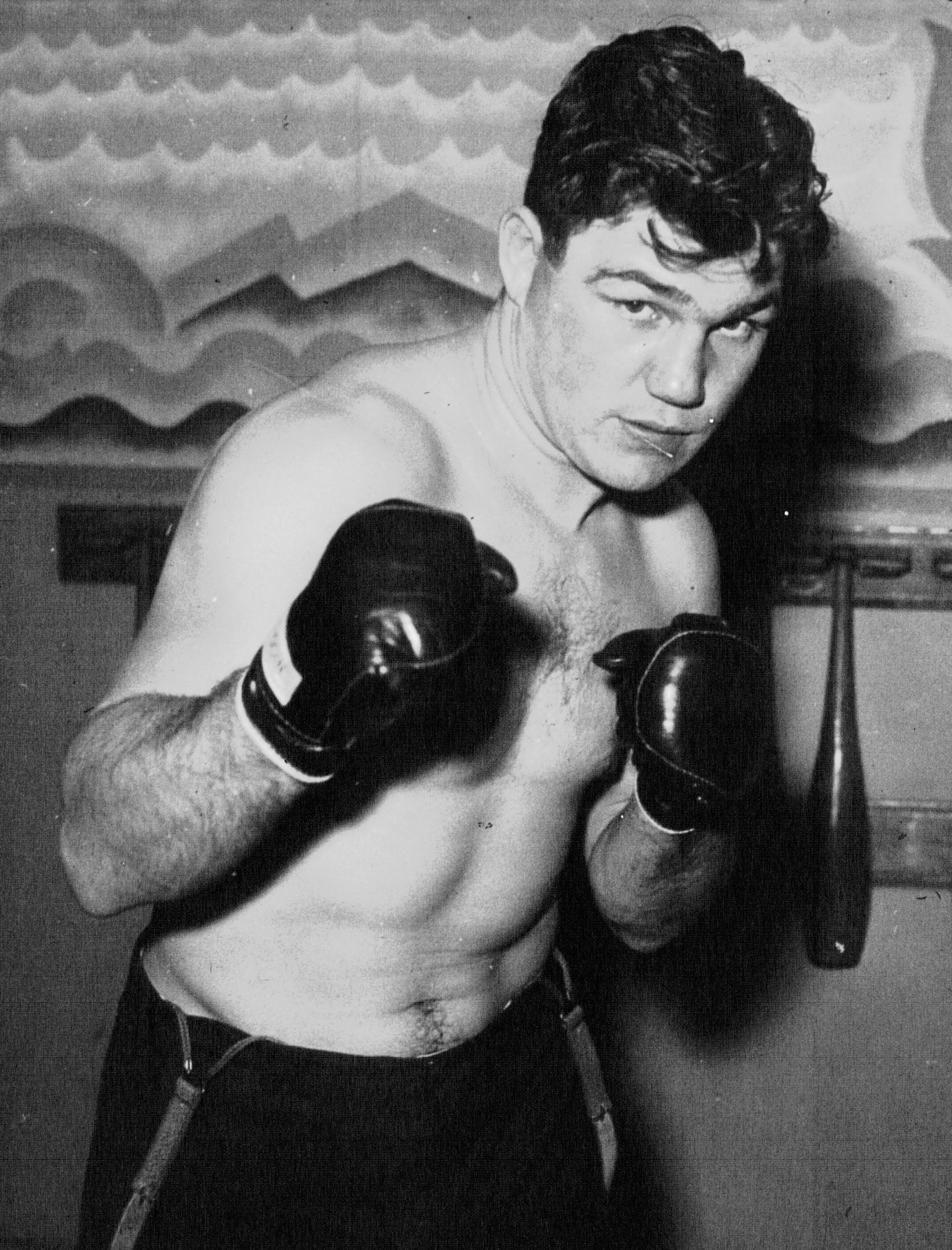
Lou Brouillard

On October 30, 1933, after six years in the professional ring, Dundee defeated Lou Brouillard over 15 rounds before 9,330 in Boston to capture the New York State Athletic Commission's (NYSAC) world middleweight title. Dundee side-stepped most of Brouillard's savage rushes and countered repeatedly with rights to the head, in a close decision. Dundee managed to take eight rounds, but most of his scored points were from calculated blows, and there were no knockdowns in the bout. Brouillard had difficulty penetrating the defenses of Dundee, and could only score consistently with brief attacks to the body. Brouillard, though a 3-1 favorite, had difficulty with the skilled scientific boxing and calculated defense of Dundee. Brouillard claimed fatigue in making the 160 pound weight limit was the cause of his loss, but Dundee opened up well by the last round, and stung Brouillard with both lefts and rights that clinched his scoring margin, and likely had an effect. In the early rounds, Dundee danced for position and strategically landed left jabs to Brouillard's face that piled up points and kept his opponent at a distance.

Dundee defended his world middleweight title on December 8, 1933, against southpaw Andy Callahan, winning in a fifteen-round split decision against Andy Callahan before 11,200 in Boston. Dundee dominated the last five rounds, though Callahan frequently tried to force the fighting which was particularly close in the first ten rounds. The Boston Globe gave Dundee nine rounds with only the first, seventh, eighth, and ninth to Callahan. Dundee fought with both a four-inch height advantage, and a not insignificant advantage in reach. Callahan scored in the first two thirds of the bout with hard rights and harder lefts to the head and body before tiring in the ninth. Callahan landed a few solid blows with his left, which he also led with, but had difficulty connecting with his right.

Dundee defeated French-Canadian boxer Al McCoy on March 22, 1934, in a ten-round unanimous decision in Boston. Dundee won decisively, though he took a beating during a strong display of offense by McCoy in the first three rounds.

Before a crowd of 8,000, Dundee mounted his second successful defense of the world middleweight title against Al Diamond on May 3, 1934, in Paterson, New Jersey, winning in a fifteen-round points decision. The referee gave eleven rounds of the decisive win to Dundee with only the third to Diamond. Aiming for the body and delivering a strong right to Diamond's left side through most of the bout, Dundee hammered away, particularly when the two were close.

=== Losing the world middleweight title, September, 1934 ===
Dundee lost his claim to the middleweight crown when he was outpointed by Teddy Yarosz in a fifteen-round decision on September 11, 1934, before a crowd of 28,000 at Forbes Field in Pittsburgh. The bout was close but somewhat dull due to too much wrestling and clinching, though Yarosz seemed to hold the lead in all but the late rounds when he looked visibly exhausted. Yarosz was awarded eight rounds to Dundee's four, with three even. He scored well with long range blows to the head of Dundee, who seemed to focus more on Yarosz's midsection. Dundee was down three times during the bout, once falling out of the ropes in round three.

Dundee defeated Babe Risko on January 25, 1935, in a close ten round split decision at Madison Square Garden. The fight was originally declared a victory for Sisko, with Judge Sidney Scharlin and referee Jed Gahan voting in favor of Sisko and the other judge, Jack Britton, voting in favor of Dundee. State athletic commissioner John J. Phelan, who was sitting at ringside, immediately performed an inspection of the ballots and found that Britton gave seven to Dundee and three to Risko and Scharlin scored five rounds for Dundee with four to Risko. Phelan, fellow commissioner Bill Brown, and Scharlin conferred and the decision was reversed in favor of Dundee. The Associated Press gave six rounds to Dundee and four to Risko. Risko rallied in the last few rounds, but Dundee's more sustained aggressiveness and frequent blows to the body gave him the decision on points.

Dundee lost to Freddie Steele on July 30, 1935, in a brutal third-round technical knockout. Dundee was down eleven times in the bout, before the referee stopped the match. He was hospitalized at Seattle's Providence Hospital, after sustaining a slight concussion and a jaw broken in three places on the left side. Dundee was down four times in the first, three times in the second, and three times in the third. Only fifty seconds into the first round, Dundee was down for a nine count from a left to the point of his jaw. His second trip to the canvas was also from a blow to the jaw, and also for a count of nine. Steele had lost only four times by decision in his previous 72 fights.

Dundee retired with a record of 118 wins (28 knockouts), 20 losses and 13 draws.

== Life after boxing ==
Dundee survived a collision with a train that hurled his automobile several hundred feet not long after his boxing career ended. He later was stricken with Multiple Sclerosis in 1942.

== Death ==
Dundee died at a Glendale, California sanitarium in 1949 of Multiple Sclerosis, after being diagnosed with the disease five years earlier. He had been confined to the sanitarium for seven years. He was survived by his wife, Connie; son, Vince Jr.; and father, Luigi Lazzara of Baltimore, Maryland.

== Professional boxing record ==
All information in this section is derived from BoxRec, unless otherwise stated.

=== Official record ===
158 fights	118 wins	19 losses
By knockout	29	1
By decision	89	18
Draws	14	
No contests	1	
Newspaper decisions/draws	6	

All newspaper decisions are officially regarded as “no decision” bouts and are not counted in the win/loss/draw column.

No.	Result	Record	Opponent	Type	Round(s)	Date	Location	Notes
158	Loss	118–19–14 (7)	Honeyboy Jones	PTS	10	Jun 15, 1937	Hickey Park, Millvale, Pennsylvania, U.S.	
157	Win	118–18–14 (7)	Thys Menger	PTS	8	May 17, 1937	Laurel Garden, Newark, New Jersey, U.S.	
156	Loss	117–18–14 (7)	Billy Conn	UD	10	May 3, 1937	Duquesne Garden, Pittsburgh, Pennsylvania, U.S.	
155	Win	117–17–14 (7)	Leo Finnegan	KO	3 (8)	Apr 19, 1937	Arena, Trenton, New Jersey, U.S.	
154	Win	116–17–14 (7)	Bill Murphy	KO	3 (8)	Apr 12, 1937	Amusement Academy, Plainfield, New Jersey, U.S.	
153	Win	115–17–14 (7)	Johnny Duca	PTS	10	Apr 2, 1937	Cambria A.C., Philadelphia, Pennsylvania, U.S.	
152	Win	114–17–14 (7)	Joe Duca	PTS	10	Mar 1, 1937	Laurel Garden, Newark, New Jersey, U.S.	
151	Loss	113–17–14 (7)	Freddie Steele	TKO	3 (10)	Jul 30, 1935	Civic Ice Arena, Seattle, Washington, U.S.	
150	Win	113–16–14 (7)	Anson Green	UD	10	May 20, 1935	Hickey Park, Millvale, Pennsylvania, U.S.	
149	Loss	112–16–14 (7)	Joe Smallwood	UD	10	Apr 22, 1935	Maple Grove Field House, Lancaster, Pennsylvania, U.S.	
148	Win	112–15–14 (7)	Eddie Babe Risko	SD	10	Jan 25, 1935	Madison Square Garden, Manhattan, New York City, New York, U.S.	
147	Win	111–15–14 (7)	Paul Pirrone	UD	10	Jan 14, 1935	Arena, Philadelphia, Pennsylvania, U.S.	
146	Win	110–15–14 (7)	Vincenzo Troiano	TKO	5 (10)	Jan 2, 1935	Laurel Garden, Newark, New Jersey, U.S.	
145	Loss	109–15–14 (7)	Teddy Yarosz	SD	15	Sep 11, 1934	Forbes Field, Pittsburgh, Pennsylvania, U.S.	Lost NBA and NYSAC middleweight titles
144	Win	109–14–14 (7)	Tony Brescia	PTS	10	Aug 17, 1934	Fort Hamilton Arena, Brooklyn, New York City, New York, U.S.	
143	Loss	108–14–14 (7)	Tommy Rios	PTS	10	Aug 9, 1934	Delaware County Arena, Leiperville, Pennsylvania, U.S.	
142	Loss	108–13–14 (7)	Young Stuhley	MD	10	Jun 26, 1934	Mills Stadium, Chicago, Illinois, U.S.	
141	Win	108–12–14 (7)	Al Diamond	PTS	15	May 3, 1934	Armory, Paterson, New Jersey, U.S.	Retained NBA and NYSAC middleweight titles
140	Win	107–12–14 (7)	Matt Rice	KO	8 (10)	Apr 10, 1934	Charlton's Hall, Pottsville, Pennsylvania, U.S.	
139	Win	106–12–14 (7)	Al McCoy	UD	10	Mar 22, 1934	Mechanics Building, Boston, Massachusetts, U.S.	
138	Win	105–12–14 (7)	Joe Kaminski	PTS	10	Mar 12, 1934	Valley Arena, Holyoke, Massachusetts, U.S.	
137	Win	104–12–14 (7)	Ben Jeby	MD	10	Feb 16, 1934	Chicago Stadium, Chicago, Illinois, U.S.	
136	Win	103–12–14 (7)	Andy Callahan	SD	15	Dec 8, 1933	Boston Garden, Boston, Massachusetts, U.S.	Retained NBA and NYSAC middleweight titles
135	Win	102–12–14 (7)	Lou Brouillard	UD	15	Oct 30, 1933	Boston Garden, Boston, Massachusetts, U.S.	Won NBA and NYSAC middleweight titles
134	Loss	101–12–14 (7)	Teddy Yarosz	PTS	10	Sep 18, 1933	Dreamland Park, Newark, New Jersey, U.S.	
133	Loss	101–11–14 (7)	Teddy Yarosz	PTS	10	Aug 21, 1933	Forbes Field, Pittsburgh, Pennsylvania, U.S.	For vacant Pennsylvania State middleweight title
132	Win	101–10–14 (7)	Danny Devlin	TKO	5 (10)	Aug 11, 1933	Market Street Arena, Paterson, New Jersey, U.S.	
131	Win	100–10–14 (7)	Frank Goosby	KO	8 (10)	Jun 8, 1933	Northside Arena, Pittsburgh, Pennsylvania, U.S.	
130	Win	99–10–14 (7)	Neil Kilbane	TKO	5 (10)	May 25, 1933	Fort Hamilton Arena, Brooklyn, New York City, New York, U.S.	
129	Draw	98–10–14 (7)	Ben Jeby	PTS	15	Mar 17, 1933	Madison Square Garden, Manhattan, New York City, New York, U.S.	For NYSAC middleweight title
128	Win	98–10–13 (7)	Jimmy Rhodes	TKO	5 (8)	Mar 6, 1933	Waltz Dream Arena, Atlantic City, New Jersey, U.S.	
127	Win	97–10–13 (7)	Franta Nekolny	PTS	10	Jan 2, 1933	St. Nicholas Arena, Manhattan, New York City, New York, U.S.	
126	Win	96–10–13 (7)	Johnny Peppe	PTS	8	Dec 12, 1932	Arena, Trenton, New Jersey, U.S.	
125	Win	95–10–13 (7)	Owen Phelps	PTS	10	Oct 4, 1932	Portner's Arena, Alexandria, Virginia, U.S.	
124	Win	94–10–13 (7)	Tiger Sullivan	PTS	10	Sep 15, 1932	Market Street Arena, Paterson, New Jersey, U.S.	
123	Win	93–10–13 (7)	Billy Angelo	PTS	10	Sep 2, 1932	Beach Casino, Asbury Park, New Jersey, U.S.	
122	Win	92–10–13 (7)	Ken Overlin	PTS	10	Aug 10, 1932	Arena, Virginia Beach, Virginia, U.S.	
121	Win	91–10–13 (7)	Young Terry	SD	10	Jul 18, 1932	Dreamland Park, Newark, New Jersey, U.S.	
120	Win	90–10–13 (7)	Joe Smallwood	PTS	10	Jul 11, 1932	Open Air Arena, Leiperville, Pennsylvania, U.S.	
119	Win	89–10–13 (7)	Abie Bain	PTS	10	Jun 15, 1932	Dreamland Park, Newark, New Jersey, U.S.	
118	Win	88–10–13 (7)	Matt Rice	UD	10	Jun 9, 1932	Kingston Armory, Kingston, Pennsylvania, U.S.	
117	Win	87–10–13 (7)	Thomas Lawless	PTS	10	May 23, 1932	Dreamland Park, Newark, New Jersey, U.S.	
116	Win	86–10–13 (7)	Johnny Oakey	PTS	10	Apr 4, 1932	Arena, Trenton, New Jersey, U.S.	
115	Win	85–10–13 (7)	Young Ketchell	UD	10	Mar 18, 1932	South Main Street Armory, Wilkes-Barre, Pennsylvania, U.S.	
114	Win	84–10–13 (7)	Vincent Forgione	KO	4 (10)	Mar 14, 1932	104th Regiment Armory, Baltimore, Maryland, U.S.	
113	Win	83–10–13 (7)	Billy Angelo	PTS	10	Mar 7, 1932	Arena, Philadelphia, Pennsylvania, U.S.	
112	Win	82–10–13 (7)	Jimmy Smith	PTS	10	Jan 18, 1932	Arena, Philadelphia, Pennsylvania, U.S.	
111	Win	81–10–13 (7)	Ernesto Sagues	TKO	9 (10)	Dec 14, 1931	Cinderella Ballroom, Miami, Florida, U.S.	
110	Win	80–10–13 (7)	Johnny Peppe	PTS	8	Dec 8, 1931	Amusement Academy, Plainfield, New Jersey, U.S.	
109	Win	79–10–13 (7)	Jack Kiernan	KO	2 (10)	Nov 5, 1931	Armory, Paterson, New Jersey, U.S.	
108	Win	78–10–13 (7)	Solly Krieger	TKO	8 (10)	Oct 16, 1931	Madison Square Garden, Manhattan, New York City, New York, U.S.	Krieger broke his left elbow
107	Win	77–10–13 (7)	Johnny Peppe	PTS	10	Oct 12, 1931	Arena, Philadelphia, Pennsylvania, U.S.	
106	Draw	76–10–13 (7)	Jack Hood	PTS	10	Jul 27, 1931	White City Stadium, White City, London, England, United Kingdom	
105	Loss	76–10–12 (7)	Marcel Thil	UD	12	Jul 10, 1931	Stade Roland Garros, Paris, Paris, France	
104	Win	76–9–12 (7)	Ben Jeby	PTS	10	Jun 4, 1931	Madison Square Garden, Manhattan, New York City, New York, U.S.	
103	Win	75–9–12 (7)	Johnny Kerr	TKO	6 (10)	May 7, 1931	Turn Hall, Paterson, New Jersey, U.S.	
102	Win	74–9–12 (7)	Len Harvey	SD	12	Feb 13, 1931	Madison Square Garden, Manhattan, New York City, New York, U.S.	
101	Win	73–9–12 (7)	Len Harvey	UD	12	Jan 9, 1931	Madison Square Garden, Manhattan, New York City, New York, U.S.	
100	Win	72–9–12 (7)	Buck McTiernan	PTS	10	Dec 25, 1930	Motor Square Garden, Pittsburgh, Pennsylvania, U.S.	
99	Win	71–9–12 (7)	Dennis Golden	TKO	7 (10)	Dec 15, 1930	Laurel Garden, Newark, New Jersey, U.S.	
98	Win	70–9–12 (7)	Johnny Peppe	PTS	8	Dec 2, 1930	Armory, Reading, Pennsylvania, U.S.	
97	Win	69–9–12 (7)	Joe Reno	PTS	10	Nov 17, 1930	Laurel Garden, Newark, New Jersey, U.S.	
96	Win	68–9–12 (7)	Abie Bain	PTS	10	Aug 27, 1930	Dreamland Park, Newark, New Jersey, U.S.	
95	Loss	67–9–12 (7)	My Sullivan	NWS	10	Jul 22, 1930	Saint Paul, Minnesota, U.S.	
94	Win	67–9–12 (6)	Young Ketchell	PTS	10	Jun 19, 1930	Open Air Arena, Leiperville, Pennsylvania, U.S.	
93	Win	66–9–12 (6)	Ben Jeby	PTS	10	Apr 4, 1930	Madison Square Garden, Manhattan, New York City, New York, U.S.	
92	Loss	65–9–12 (6)	Johnny Indrisano	UD	10	Mar 21, 1930	Boston Garden, Boston, Massachusetts, U.S.	
91	Win	65–8–12 (6)	Alf Ros	PTS	10	Mar 17, 1930	Laurel Garden, Newark, New Jersey, U.S.	
90	Win	64–8–12 (6)	Thomas Lawless	PTS	10	Feb 21, 1930	Madison Square Garden, Manhattan, New York City, New York, U.S.	
89	Loss	63–8–12 (6)	Jackie Fields	UD	10	Jan 24, 1930	Chicago Stadium, Chicago, Illinois, U.S.	
88	Win	63–7–12 (6)	Billy Leonard	KO	1 (10)	Jan 13, 1930	Laurel Garden, Newark, New Jersey, U.S.	
87	Win	62–7–12 (6)	My Sullivan	PTS	10	Nov 15, 1929	Coliseum, Chicago, Illinois, U.S.	
86	Win	61–7–12 (6)	Young Ketchell	PTS	10	Oct 24, 1929	Armory, Newark, New Jersey, U.S.	
85	Loss	60–7–12 (6)	Jackie Fields	PTS	10	Oct 2, 1929	Coliseum, Chicago, Illinois, U.S.	
84	Draw	60–6–12 (6)	Abie Bain	PTS	10	Sep 16, 1929	Velodrome, Newark, New Jersey, U.S.	
83	Draw	60–6–11 (6)	Abie Bain	PTS	10	Aug 19, 1929	Velodrome, Newark, New Jersey, U.S.	
82	Win	60–6–10 (6)	Freddie Polo	PTS	10	Jul 2, 1929	Velodrome, Newark, New Jersey, U.S.	
81	Win	59–6–10 (6)	Izzy Grove	PTS	10	Jun 10, 1929	Velodrome, Newark, New Jersey, U.S.	
80	Win	58–6–10 (6)	Thomas Lawless	PTS	10	May 28, 1929	Taylor Bowl, Newburgh Heights, Ohio, U.S.	
79	Win	57–6–10 (6)	Pal Silvers	PTS	10	May 22, 1929	Velodrome, Newark, New Jersey, U.S.	
78	Win	56–6–10 (6)	Joey LaGrey	PTS	10	Apr 19, 1929	New York Coliseum, Bronx, New York City, New York, U.S.	
77	Loss	55–6–10 (6)	Izzy Grove	PTS	10	Apr 8, 1929	St. Nicholas Arena, Manhattan, New York City, New York, U.S.	
76	Loss	55–5–10 (6)	Billy Angelo	PTS	10	Feb 18, 1929	Arena, Philadelphia, Pennsylvania, U.S.	
75	Win	55–4–10 (6)	Young Ketchell	PTS	10	Jan 21, 1929	Arena, Philadelphia, Pennsylvania, U.S.	
74	Win	54–4–10 (6)	Billy Angelo	PTS	10	Jan 14, 1929	Arena, Philadelphia, Pennsylvania, U.S.	
73	Loss	53–4–10 (6)	Al Mello	PTS	10	Dec 20, 1928	Boston Garden, Boston, Massachusetts, U.S.	
72	Draw	53–3–10 (6)	Canada Lee	PTS	10	Dec 15, 1928	Olympia Boxing Club, Manhattan, New York City, New York, U.S.	
71	Win	53–3–9 (6)	Izzy Grove	PTS	10	Nov 30, 1928	Madison Square Garden, Manhattan, New York City, New York, U.S.	
70	Win	52–3–9 (6)	Billy Alger	PTS	10	Oct 29, 1928	Newark, New Jersey, U.S.	
69	Win	51–3–9 (6)	Danny Fagan	NWS	10	Aug 13, 1928	Velodrome, Newark, New Jersey, U.S.	
68	Win	51–3–9 (5)	Jimmy Finley	PTS	12	May 21, 1928	104th Regiment Armory, Baltimore, Maryland, U.S.	
67	Loss	50–3–9 (5)	Jackie Fields	PTS	10	Apr 17, 1928	Olympic Auditorium, Los Angeles, California, U.S.	
66	Win	50–2–9 (5)	Pete August	PTS	10	Mar 16, 1928	Legion Stadium, Hollywood, California, U.S.	
65	Win	49–2–9 (5)	Bobby LaSalle	PTS	10	Feb 22, 1928	Wilmington Bowl, Wilmington, California, U.S.	
64	Loss	48–2–9 (5)	Jackie Fields	PTS	10	Feb 14, 1928	Olympic Auditorium, Los Angeles, California, U.S.	
63	Draw	48–1–9 (5)	Joe Vargas	PTS	10	Dec 23, 1927	Golden Gate Arena, San Francisco, California, U.S.	
62	Win	48–1–8 (5)	Tommy O'Brien	PTS	10	Dec 16, 1927	Legion Stadium, Hollywood, California, U.S.	
61	Win	47–1–8 (5)	Baby Joe Gans	PTS	10	Dec 6, 1927	Olympic Auditorium, Los Angeles, California, U.S.	
60	Win	46–1–8 (5)	Eddie Mahoney	KO	2 (10)	Nov 3, 1927	Wrigley Field, Los Angeles, California, U.S.	
59	Loss	45–1–8 (5)	Joe Reno	NWS	10	Oct 3, 1927	Arena, Trenton, New Jersey, U.S.	
58	Win	45–1–8 (4)	Danny Cooney	PTS	10	Sep 22, 1927	Braves Field, Boston, Massachusetts, U.S.	
57	Win	44–1–8 (4)	Joe Marino	TKO	5 (10)	Sep 9, 1927	Ocean Park Casino, Long Branch, New Jersey, U.S.	
56	Win	43–1–8 (4)	Willie Harmon	PTS	10	Aug 1, 1927	Carlin's Park, Baltimore, Maryland, U.S.	
55	Win	42–1–8 (4)	Jack Kiernan	NWS	10	Jul 22, 1927	Ocean Park Casino, Long Branch, New Jersey, U.S.	
54	Win	42–1–8 (3)	Joe Reno	NWS	8	Jul 8, 1927	Ocean Park Casino, Long Branch, New Jersey, U.S.	
53	Win	42–1–8 (2)	Georgie Russell	TKO	3 (10)	Apr 11, 1927	104th Regiment Armory, Baltimore, Maryland, U.S.	
52	Win	41–1–8 (2)	Al Conway	NWS	10	Apr 4, 1927	Laurel Garden, Newark, New Jersey, U.S.	
51	Win	41–1–8 (1)	Eddie Burnbrook	TKO	11 (12)	Mar 7, 1927	104th Regiment Armory, Baltimore, Maryland, U.S.	
50	Win	40–1–8 (1)	Paul Demsky	PTS	12	Feb 14, 1927	104th Regiment Armory, Baltimore, Maryland, U.S.	
49	Win	39–1–8 (1)	Battling Willard	PTS	8	Jan 1, 1927	Convention Hall, Lancaster, Pennsylvania, U.S.	
48	Win	38–1–8 (1)	Oakland Bobby Burns	PTS	8	Dec 4, 1926	Recreation Park, San Francisco, California, U.S.	
47	Loss	37–1–8 (1)	Andy DiVodi	PTS	6	Oct 15, 1926	Madison Square Garden, Manhattan, New York City, New York, U.S.	
46	Win	37–0–8 (1)	Pat Haley	UD	10	Sep 24, 1926	Cambria A.C., Philadelphia, Pennsylvania, U.S.	
45	Win	36–0–8 (1)	Charlie Sapko	PTS	4	Sep 9, 1926	Madison Square Garden, Manhattan, New York City, New York, U.S.	
44	Win	35–0–8 (1)	Alex Hart	PTS	12	Aug 30, 1926	Carlin's Park, Baltimore, Maryland, U.S.	
43	Win	34–0–8 (1)	Battling Willard	TKO	9 (10)	Jul 7, 1926	Ben Franklin Arena, Kenilworth, Maryland, U.S.	
42	Win	33–0–8 (1)	Carl Courtney	PTS	4	Jun 24, 1926	Madison Square Garden, Manhattan, New York City, New York, U.S.	
41	Win	32–0–8 (1)	Willie Wiggins	TKO	5 (12)	Jun 8, 1926	Ben Franklin Arena, Kenilworth, Maryland, U.S.	
40	Win	31–0–8 (1)	Len Mahoney	TKO	4 (8)	Mar 8, 1926	104th Regiment Armory, Baltimore, Maryland, U.S.	
39	NC	30–0–8 (1)	Harry Brown	NC	5 (10)	Feb 8, 1926	104th Regiment Armory, Baltimore, Maryland, U.S.	
38	Win	30–0–8	Johnny Hayes	PTS	8	Dec 5, 1925	Adelphia A.C., Philadelphia, Pennsylvania, U.S.	
37	Win	29–0–8	Frankie Ferro	SD	10	Nov 13, 1925	Cambria A.C., Philadelphia, Pennsylvania, U.S.	
36	Win	28–0–8	Tony Cortez	PTS	8	Oct 12, 1925	104th Regiment Armory, Baltimore, Maryland, U.S.	
35	Win	27–0–8	Pat Haley	PTS	10	Oct 9, 1925	Cambria A.C., Philadelphia, Pennsylvania, U.S.	
34	Win	26–0–8	Tony Cortez	PTS	8	Sep 28, 1925	104th Regiment Armory, Baltimore, Maryland, U.S.	
33	Win	25–0–8	Nick Bass	PTS	10	Aug 3, 1925	Carlin's Park, Baltimore, Maryland, U.S.	
32	Win	24–0–8	Danny Gordon	PTS	6	Jun 8, 1925	Carlin's Park, Baltimore, Maryland, U.S.	
31	Win	23–0–8	Philadelphia Joe Welling	PTS	6	Apr 27, 1925	104th Regiment Armory, Baltimore, Maryland, U.S.	
30	Draw	22–0–8	Danny Gordon	PTS	6	Apr 7, 1925	Folly Theater, Baltimore, Maryland, U.S.	
29	Win	22–0–7	Battling Willard	PTS	6	Mar 18, 1925	Folly Theater, Baltimore, Maryland, U.S.	
28	Win	21–0–7	Tony Cortez	PTS	6	Feb 2, 1925	Folly Theater, Baltimore, Maryland, U.S.	
27	Draw	20–0–7	George Leslie	PTS	6	Dec 29, 1924	Folly Theater, Baltimore, Maryland, U.S.	
26	Win	20–0–6	Young Mickey	KO	1 (6)	Dec 1, 1924	Folly Theater, Baltimore, Maryland, U.S.	
25	Win	19–0–6	Frankie Ferro	PTS	6	Oct 29, 1924	Folly Theater, Baltimore, Maryland, U.S.	
24	Win	18–0–6	Jack Gallagher	PTS	6	Oct 1, 1924	Folly Theater, Baltimore, Maryland, U.S.	
23	Win	17–0–6	Willie Patterson	PTS	8	Sep 3, 1924	Folly Theater, Baltimore, Maryland, U.S.	
22	Win	16–0–6	Jack Buckey	KO	4 (8)	Aug 13, 1924	Maryland Ball Park, Baltimore, Maryland, U.S.	
21	Win	15–0–6	Jack Ryan	PTS	8	Jun 25, 1924	Gayety Theater, Baltimore, Maryland, U.S.	
20	Win	14–0–6	Johnny Conroy	TKO	3 (6)	Jun 13, 1924	Carlin's Park, Baltimore, Maryland, U.S.	
19	Draw	13–0–6	Willie Patterson	PTS	6	Jun 4, 1924	Gayety Theater, Baltimore, Maryland, U.S.	
18	Win	13–0–5	Lou Guglielmini	PTS	6	May 26, 1924	Ben Franklin Arena, Kenilworth, Maryland, U.S.	
17	Win	12–0–5	Charles Barber	TKO	5 (8)	Apr 23, 1924	Gayety Theater, Baltimore, Maryland, U.S.	
16	Draw	11–0–5	Charles Barber	PTS	8	Apr 9, 1924	Gayety Theater, Baltimore, Maryland, U.S.	
15	Draw	11–0–4	Charles Barber	PTS	8	Apr 4, 1924	Folly Theater, Baltimore, Maryland, U.S.	
14	Win	11–0–3	Jack Buckey	PTS	6	Mar 14, 1924	Folly Theater, Baltimore, Maryland, U.S.	
13	Draw	10–0–3	Charles Barber	PTS	6	Feb 27, 1924	Gayety Theater, Baltimore, Maryland, U.S.	
12	Draw	10–0–2	Charles Barber	PTS	6	Feb 15, 1924	Folly Theater, Baltimore, Maryland, U.S.	
11	Win	10–0–1	Lew McCarthy	TKO	3 (6)	Feb 1, 1924	Folly Theater, Baltimore, Maryland, U.S.	
10	Win	9–0–1	Lew McCarthy	PTS	6	Jan 9, 1924	Gayety Theater, Baltimore, Maryland, U.S.	
9	Win	8–0–1	Lew McCarthy	PTS	4	Dec 28, 1923	Folly Theater, Baltimore, Maryland, U.S.	
8	Win	7–0–1	Jimmy Hogan	PTS	4	Dec 14, 1923	Folly Theater, Baltimore, Maryland, U.S.	
7	Win	6–0–1	Young Mickey	KO	2 (6)	Nov 30, 1923	Folly Theater, Baltimore, Maryland, U.S.	
6	Win	5–0–1	Young Kilbane	KO	2 (4)	Nov 21, 1923	Gayety Theater, Baltimore, Maryland, U.S.	
5	Win	4–0–1	Harlem Pete Kelly	PTS	4	Nov 14, 1923	Gayety Theater, Baltimore, Maryland, U.S.	
4	Draw	3–0–1	Dave Rogers	PTS	4	Nov 2, 1923	Folly Theater, Baltimore, Maryland, U.S.	
3	Win	3–0	Phil Herman	PTS	4	Oct 17, 1923	Gayety Theater, Baltimore, Maryland, U.S.	
2	Win	2–0	Harlem Pete Kelly	PTS	4	Sep 26, 1923	Gayety Theater, Baltimore, Maryland, U.S.	
1	Win	1–0	Mickey White	PTS	4	Sep 19, 1923	Gayety Theater, Baltimore, Maryland, U.S.	

=== Unofficial record ===
158 fights	122 wins	21 losses
By knockout	29	1
By decision	93	20
Draws	14	
No contests	1	

Record with the inclusion of newspaper decisions in the win/loss/draw column.

No.	Result	Record	Opponent	Type	Round(s)	Date	Location	Notes
158	Loss	122–21–14 (1)	Honeyboy Jones	PTS	10	Jun 15, 1937	Hickey Park, Millvale, Pennsylvania, U.S.	
157	Win	122–20–14 (1)	Thys Menger	PTS	8	May 17, 1937	Laurel Garden, Newark, New Jersey, U.S.	
156	Loss	121–20–14 (1)	Billy Conn	UD	10	May 3, 1937	Duquesne Garden, Pittsburgh, Pennsylvania, U.S.	
155	Win	121–19–14 (1)	Leo Finnegan	KO	3 (8)	Apr 19, 1937	Arena, Trenton, New Jersey, U.S.	
154	Win	120–19–14 (1)	Bill Murphy	KO	3 (8)	Apr 12, 1937	Amusement Academy, Plainfield, New Jersey, U.S.	
153	Win	119–19–14 (1)	Johnny Duca	PTS	10	Apr 2, 1937	Cambria A.C., Philadelphia, Pennsylvania, U.S.	
152	Win	118–19–14 (1)	Joe Duca	PTS	10	Mar 1, 1937	Laurel Garden, Newark, New Jersey, U.S.	
151	Loss	117–19–14 (1)	Freddie Steele	TKO	3 (10)	Jul 30, 1935	Civic Ice Arena, Seattle, Washington, U.S.	
150	Win	117–18–14 (1)	Anson Green	UD	10	May 20, 1935	Hickey Park, Millvale, Pennsylvania, U.S.	
149	Loss	116–18–14 (1)	Joe Smallwood	UD	10	Apr 22, 1935	Maple Grove Field House, Lancaster, Pennsylvania, U.S.	
148	Win	116–17–14 (1)	Eddie Babe Risko	SD	10	Jan 25, 1935	Madison Square Garden, Manhattan, New York City, New York, U.S.	
147	Win	115–17–14 (1)	Paul Pirrone	UD	10	Jan 14, 1935	Arena, Philadelphia, Pennsylvania, U.S.	
146	Win	114–17–14 (1)	Vincenzo Troiano	TKO	5 (10)	Jan 2, 1935	Laurel Garden, Newark, New Jersey, U.S.	
145	Loss	113–17–14 (1)	Teddy Yarosz	SD	15	Sep 11, 1934	Forbes Field, Pittsburgh, Pennsylvania, U.S.	Lost NBA and NYSAC middleweight titles
144	Win	113–16–14 (1)	Tony Brescia	PTS	10	Aug 17, 1934	Fort Hamilton Arena, Brooklyn, New York City, New York, U.S.	
143	Loss	112–16–14 (1)	Tommy Rios	PTS	10	Aug 9, 1934	Delaware County Arena, Leiperville, Pennsylvania, U.S.	
142	Loss	112–15–14 (1)	Young Stuhley	MD	10	Jun 26, 1934	Mills Stadium, Chicago, Illinois, U.S.	
141	Win	112–14–14 (1)	Al Diamond	PTS	15	May 3, 1934	Armory, Paterson, New Jersey, U.S.	Retained NBA and NYSAC middleweight titles
140	Win	111–14–14 (1)	Matt Rice	KO	8 (10)	Apr 10, 1934	Charlton's Hall, Pottsville, Pennsylvania, U.S.	
139	Win	110–14–14 (1)	Al McCoy	UD	10	Mar 22, 1934	Mechanics Building, Boston, Massachusetts, U.S.	
138	Win	109–14–14 (1)	Joe Kaminski	PTS	10	Mar 12, 1934	Valley Arena, Holyoke, Massachusetts, U.S.	
137	Win	108–14–14 (1)	Ben Jeby	MD	10	Feb 16, 1934	Chicago Stadium, Chicago, Illinois, U.S.	
136	Win	107–14–14 (1)	Andy Callahan	SD	15	Dec 8, 1933	Boston Garden, Boston, Massachusetts, U.S.	Retained NBA and NYSAC middleweight titles
135	Win	106–14–14 (1)	Lou Brouillard	UD	15	Oct 30, 1933	Boston Garden, Boston, Massachusetts, U.S.	Won NBA and NYSAC middleweight titles
134	Loss	105–14–14 (1)	Teddy Yarosz	PTS	10	Sep 18, 1933	Dreamland Park, Newark, New Jersey, U.S.	
133	Loss	105–13–14 (1)	Teddy Yarosz	PTS	10	Aug 21, 1933	Forbes Field, Pittsburgh, Pennsylvania, U.S.	For vacant Pennsylvania State middleweight title
132	Win	105–12–14 (1)	Danny Devlin	TKO	5 (10)	Aug 11, 1933	Market Street Arena, Paterson, New Jersey, U.S.	
131	Win	104–12–14 (1)	Frank Goosby	KO	8 (10)	Jun 8, 1933	Northside Arena, Pittsburgh, Pennsylvania, U.S.	
130	Win	103–12–14 (1)	Neil Kilbane	TKO	5 (10)	May 25, 1933	Fort Hamilton Arena, Brooklyn, New York City, New York, U.S.	
129	Draw	102–12–14 (1)	Ben Jeby	PTS	15	Mar 17, 1933	Madison Square Garden, Manhattan, New York City, New York, U.S.	For NYSAC middleweight title
128	Win	102–12–13 (1)	Jimmy Rhodes	TKO	5 (8)	Mar 6, 1933	Waltz Dream Arena, Atlantic City, New Jersey, U.S.	
127	Win	101–12–13 (1)	Franta Nekolny	PTS	10	Jan 2, 1933	St. Nicholas Arena, Manhattan, New York City, New York, U.S.	
126	Win	100–12–13 (1)	Johnny Peppe	PTS	8	Dec 12, 1932	Arena, Trenton, New Jersey, U.S.	
125	Win	99–12–13 (1)	Owen Phelps	PTS	10	Oct 4, 1932	Portner's Arena, Alexandria, Virginia, U.S.	
124	Win	98–12–13 (1)	Tiger Sullivan	PTS	10	Sep 15, 1932	Market Street Arena, Paterson, New Jersey, U.S.	
123	Win	97–12–13 (1)	Billy Angelo	PTS	10	Sep 2, 1932	Beach Casino, Asbury Park, New Jersey, U.S.	
122	Win	96–12–13 (1)	Ken Overlin	PTS	10	Aug 10, 1932	Arena, Virginia Beach, Virginia, U.S.	
121	Win	95–12–13 (1)	Young Terry	SD	10	Jul 18, 1932	Dreamland Park, Newark, New Jersey, U.S.	
120	Win	94–12–13 (1)	Joe Smallwood	PTS	10	Jul 11, 1932	Open Air Arena, Leiperville, Pennsylvania, U.S.	
119	Win	93–12–13 (1)	Abie Bain	PTS	10	Jun 15, 1932	Dreamland Park, Newark, New Jersey, U.S.	
118	Win	92–12–13 (1)	Matt Rice	UD	10	Jun 9, 1932	Kingston Armory, Kingston, Pennsylvania, U.S.	
117	Win	91–12–13 (1)	Thomas Lawless	PTS	10	May 23, 1932	Dreamland Park, Newark, New Jersey, U.S.	
116	Win	90–12–13 (1)	Johnny Oakey	PTS	10	Apr 4, 1932	Arena, Trenton, New Jersey, U.S.	
115	Win	89–12–13 (1)	Young Ketchell	UD	10	Mar 18, 1932	South Main Street Armory, Wilkes-Barre, Pennsylvania, U.S.	
114	Win	88–12–13 (1)	Vincent Forgione	KO	4 (10)	Mar 14, 1932	104th Regiment Armory, Baltimore, Maryland, U.S.	
113	Win	87–12–13 (1)	Billy Angelo	PTS	10	Mar 7, 1932	Arena, Philadelphia, Pennsylvania, U.S.	
112	Win	86–12–13 (1)	Jimmy Smith	PTS	10	Jan 18, 1932	Arena, Philadelphia, Pennsylvania, U.S.	
111	Win	85–12–13 (1)	Ernesto Sagues	TKO	9 (10)	Dec 14, 1931	Cinderella Ballroom, Miami, Florida, U.S.	
110	Win	84–12–13 (1)	Johnny Peppe	PTS	8	Dec 8, 1931	Amusement Academy, Plainfield, New Jersey, U.S.	
109	Win	83–12–13 (1)	Jack Kiernan	KO	2 (10)	Nov 5, 1931	Armory, Paterson, New Jersey, U.S.	
108	Win	82–12–13 (1)	Solly Krieger	TKO	8 (10)	Oct 16, 1931	Madison Square Garden, Manhattan, New York City, New York, U.S.	Krieger broke his left elbow
107	Win	81–12–13 (1)	Johnny Peppe	PTS	10	Oct 12, 1931	Arena, Philadelphia, Pennsylvania, U.S.	
106	Draw	80–12–13 (1)	Jack Hood	PTS	10	Jul 27, 1931	White City Stadium, White City, London, England, United Kingdom	
105	Loss	80–12–12 (1)	Marcel Thil	UD	12	Jul 10, 1931	Stade Roland Garros, Paris, Paris, France	
104	Win	80–11–12 (1)	Ben Jeby	PTS	10	Jun 4, 1931	Madison Square Garden, Manhattan, New York City, New York, U.S.	
103	Win	79–11–12 (1)	Johnny Kerr	TKO	6 (10)	May 7, 1931	Turn Hall, Paterson, New Jersey, U.S.	
102	Win	78–11–12 (1)	Len Harvey	SD	12	Feb 13, 1931	Madison Square Garden, Manhattan, New York City, New York, U.S.	
101	Win	77–11–12 (1)	Len Harvey	UD	12	Jan 9, 1931	Madison Square Garden, Manhattan, New York City, New York, U.S.	
100	Win	76–11–12 (1)	Buck McTiernan	PTS	10	Dec 25, 1930	Motor Square Garden, Pittsburgh, Pennsylvania, U.S.	
99	Win	75–11–12 (1)	Dennis Golden	TKO	7 (10)	Dec 15, 1930	Laurel Garden, Newark, New Jersey, U.S.	
98	Win	74–11–12 (1)	Johnny Peppe	PTS	8	Dec 2, 1930	Armory, Reading, Pennsylvania, U.S.	
97	Win	73–11–12 (1)	Joe Reno	PTS	10	Nov 17, 1930	Laurel Garden, Newark, New Jersey, U.S.	
96	Win	72–11–12 (1)	Abie Bain	PTS	10	Aug 27, 1930	Dreamland Park, Newark, New Jersey, U.S.	
95	Loss	71–11–12 (1)	My Sullivan	NWS	10	Jul 22, 1930	Saint Paul, Minnesota, U.S.	
94	Win	71–10–12 (1)	Young Ketchell	PTS	10	Jun 19, 1930	Open Air Arena, Leiperville, Pennsylvania, U.S.	
93	Win	70–10–12 (1)	Ben Jeby	PTS	10	Apr 4, 1930	Madison Square Garden, Manhattan, New York City, New York, U.S.	
92	Loss	69–10–12 (1)	Johnny Indrisano	UD	10	Mar 21, 1930	Boston Garden, Boston, Massachusetts, U.S.	
91	Win	69–9–12 (1)	Alf Ros	PTS	10	Mar 17, 1930	Laurel Garden, Newark, New Jersey, U.S.	
90	Win	68–9–12 (1)	Thomas Lawless	PTS	10	Feb 21, 1930	Madison Square Garden, Manhattan, New York City, New York, U.S.	
89	Loss	67–9–12 (1)	Jackie Fields	UD	10	Jan 24, 1930	Chicago Stadium, Chicago, Illinois, U.S.	
88	Win	67–8–12 (1)	Billy Leonard	KO	1 (10)	Jan 13, 1930	Laurel Garden, Newark, New Jersey, U.S.	
87	Win	66–8–12 (1)	My Sullivan	PTS	10	Nov 15, 1929	Coliseum, Chicago, Illinois, U.S.	
86	Win	65–8–12 (1)	Young Ketchell	PTS	10	Oct 24, 1929	Armory, Newark, New Jersey, U.S.	
85	Loss	64–8–12 (1)	Jackie Fields	PTS	10	Oct 2, 1929	Coliseum, Chicago, Illinois, U.S.	
84	Draw	64–7–12 (1)	Abie Bain	PTS	10	Sep 16, 1929	Velodrome, Newark, New Jersey, U.S.	
83	Draw	64–7–11 (1)	Abie Bain	PTS	10	Aug 19, 1929	Velodrome, Newark, New Jersey, U.S.	
82	Win	64–7–10 (1)	Freddie Polo	PTS	10	Jul 2, 1929	Velodrome, Newark, New Jersey, U.S.	
81	Win	63–7–10 (1)	Izzy Grove	PTS	10	Jun 10, 1929	Velodrome, Newark, New Jersey, U.S.	
80	Win	62–7–10 (1)	Thomas Lawless	PTS	10	May 28, 1929	Taylor Bowl, Newburgh Heights, Ohio, U.S.	
79	Win	61–7–10 (1)	Pal Silvers	PTS	10	May 22, 1929	Velodrome, Newark, New Jersey, U.S.	
78	Win	60–7–10 (1)	Joey LaGrey	PTS	10	Apr 19, 1929	New York Coliseum, Bronx, New York City, New York, U.S.	
77	Loss	59–7–10 (1)	Izzy Grove	PTS	10	Apr 8, 1929	St. Nicholas Arena, Manhattan, New York City, New York, U.S.	
76	Loss	59–6–10 (1)	Billy Angelo	PTS	10	Feb 18, 1929	Arena, Philadelphia, Pennsylvania, U.S.	
75	Win	59–5–10 (1)	Young Ketchell	PTS	10	Jan 21, 1929	Arena, Philadelphia, Pennsylvania, U.S.	
74	Win	58–5–10 (1)	Billy Angelo	PTS	10	Jan 14, 1929	Arena, Philadelphia, Pennsylvania, U.S.	
73	Loss	57–5–10 (1)	Al Mello	PTS	10	Dec 20, 1928	Boston Garden, Boston, Massachusetts, U.S.	
72	Draw	57–4–10 (1)	Canada Lee	PTS	10	Dec 15, 1928	Olympia Boxing Club, Manhattan, New York City, New York, U.S.	
71	Win	57–4–9 (1)	Izzy Grove	PTS	10	Nov 30, 1928	Madison Square Garden, Manhattan, New York City, New York, U.S.	
70	Win	56–4–9 (1)	Billy Alger	PTS	10	Oct 29, 1928	Newark, New Jersey, U.S.	
69	Win	55–4–9 (1)	Danny Fagan	NWS	10	Aug 13, 1928	Velodrome, Newark, New Jersey, U.S.	
68	Win	54–4–9 (1)	Jimmy Finley	PTS	12	May 21, 1928	104th Regiment Armory, Baltimore, Maryland, U.S.	
67	Loss	53–4–9 (1)	Jackie Fields	PTS	10	Apr 17, 1928	Olympic Auditorium, Los Angeles, California, U.S.	
66	Win	53–3–9 (1)	Pete August	PTS	10	Mar 16, 1928	Legion Stadium, Hollywood, California, U.S.	
65	Win	52–3–9 (1)	Bobby LaSalle	PTS	10	Feb 22, 1928	Wilmington Bowl, Wilmington, California, U.S.	
64	Loss	51–3–9 (1)	Jackie Fields	PTS	10	Feb 14, 1928	Olympic Auditorium, Los Angeles, California, U.S.	
63	Draw	51–2–9 (1)	Joe Vargas	PTS	10	Dec 23, 1927	Golden Gate Arena, San Francisco, California, U.S.	
62	Win	51–2–8 (1)	Tommy O'Brien	PTS	10	Dec 16, 1927	Legion Stadium, Hollywood, California, U.S.	
61	Win	50–2–8 (1)	Baby Joe Gans	PTS	10	Dec 6, 1927	Olympic Auditorium, Los Angeles, California, U.S.	
60	Win	49–2–8 (1)	Eddie Mahoney	KO	2 (10)	Nov 3, 1927	Wrigley Field, Los Angeles, California, U.S.	
59	Loss	48–2–8 (1)	Joe Reno	NWS	10	Oct 3, 1927	Arena, Trenton, New Jersey, U.S.	
58	Win	48–1–8 (1)	Danny Cooney	PTS	10	Sep 22, 1927	Braves Field, Boston, Massachusetts, U.S.	
57	Win	47–1–8 (1)	Joe Marino	TKO	5 (10)	Sep 9, 1927	Ocean Park Casino, Long Branch, New Jersey, U.S.	
56	Win	46–1–8 (1)	Willie Harmon	PTS	10	Aug 1, 1927	Carlin's Park, Baltimore, Maryland, U.S.	
55	Win	45–1–8 (1)	Jack Kiernan	NWS	10	Jul 22, 1927	Ocean Park Casino, Long Branch, New Jersey, U.S.	
54	Win	44–1–8 (1)	Joe Reno	NWS	8	Jul 8, 1927	Ocean Park Casino, Long Branch, New Jersey, U.S.	
53	Win	43–1–8 (1)	Georgie Russell	TKO	3 (10)	Apr 11, 1927	104th Regiment Armory, Baltimore, Maryland, U.S.	
52	Win	42–1–8 (1)	Al Conway	NWS	10	Apr 4, 1927	Laurel Garden, Newark, New Jersey, U.S.	
51	Win	41–1–8 (1)	Eddie Burnbrook	TKO	11 (12)	Mar 7, 1927	104th Regiment Armory, Baltimore, Maryland, U.S.	
50	Win	40–1–8 (1)	Paul Demsky	PTS	12	Feb 14, 1927	104th Regiment Armory, Baltimore, Maryland, U.S.	
49	Win	39–1–8 (1)	Battling Willard	PTS	8	Jan 1, 1927	Convention Hall, Lancaster, Pennsylvania, U.S.	
48	Win	38–1–8 (1)	Oakland Bobby Burns	PTS	8	Dec 4, 1926	Recreation Park, San Francisco, California, U.S.	
47	Loss	37–1–8 (1)	Andy DiVodi	PTS	6	Oct 15, 1926	Madison Square Garden, Manhattan, New York City, New York, U.S.	
46	Win	37–0–8 (1)	Pat Haley	UD	10	Sep 24, 1926	Cambria A.C., Philadelphia, Pennsylvania, U.S.	
45	Win	36–0–8 (1)	Charlie Sapko	PTS	4	Sep 9, 1926	Madison Square Garden, Manhattan, New York City, New York, U.S.	
44	Win	35–0–8 (1)	Alex Hart	PTS	12	Aug 30, 1926	Carlin's Park, Baltimore, Maryland, U.S.	
43	Win	34–0–8 (1)	Battling Willard	TKO	9 (10)	Jul 7, 1926	Ben Franklin Arena, Kenilworth, Maryland, U.S.	
42	Win	33–0–8 (1)	Carl Courtney	PTS	4	Jun 24, 1926	Madison Square Garden, Manhattan, New York City, New York, U.S.	
41	Win	32–0–8 (1)	Willie Wiggins	TKO	5 (12)	Jun 8, 1926	Ben Franklin Arena, Kenilworth, Maryland, U.S.	
40	Win	31–0–8 (1)	Len Mahoney	TKO	4 (8)	Mar 8, 1926	104th Regiment Armory, Baltimore, Maryland, U.S.	
39	NC	30–0–8 (1)	Harry Brown	NC	5 (10)	Feb 8, 1926	104th Regiment Armory, Baltimore, Maryland, U.S.	
38	Win	30–0–8	Johnny Hayes	PTS	8	Dec 5, 1925	Adelphia A.C., Philadelphia, Pennsylvania, U.S.	
37	Win	29–0–8	Frankie Ferro	SD	10	Nov 13, 1925	Cambria A.C., Philadelphia, Pennsylvania, U.S.	
36	Win	28–0–8	Tony Cortez	PTS	8	Oct 12, 1925	104th Regiment Armory, Baltimore, Maryland, U.S.	
35	Win	27–0–8	Pat Haley	PTS	10	Oct 9, 1925	Cambria A.C., Philadelphia, Pennsylvania, U.S.	
34	Win	26–0–8	Tony Cortez	PTS	8	Sep 28, 1925	104th Regiment Armory, Baltimore, Maryland, U.S.	
33	Win	25–0–8	Nick Bass	PTS	10	Aug 3, 1925	Carlin's Park, Baltimore, Maryland, U.S.	
32	Win	24–0–8	Danny Gordon	PTS	6	Jun 8, 1925	Carlin's Park, Baltimore, Maryland, U.S.	
31	Win	23–0–8	Philadelphia Joe Welling	PTS	6	Apr 27, 1925	104th Regiment Armory, Baltimore, Maryland, U.S.	
30	Draw	22–0–8	Danny Gordon	PTS	6	Apr 7, 1925	Folly Theater, Baltimore, Maryland, U.S.	
29	Win	22–0–7	Battling Willard	PTS	6	Mar 18, 1925	Folly Theater, Baltimore, Maryland, U.S.	
28	Win	21–0–7	Tony Cortez	PTS	6	Feb 2, 1925	Folly Theater, Baltimore, Maryland, U.S.	
27	Draw	20–0–7	George Leslie	PTS	6	Dec 29, 1924	Folly Theater, Baltimore, Maryland, U.S.	
26	Win	20–0–6	Young Mickey	KO	1 (6)	Dec 1, 1924	Folly Theater, Baltimore, Maryland, U.S.	
25	Win	19–0–6	Frankie Ferro	PTS	6	Oct 29, 1924	Folly Theater, Baltimore, Maryland, U.S.	
24	Win	18–0–6	Jack Gallagher	PTS	6	Oct 1, 1924	Folly Theater, Baltimore, Maryland, U.S.	
23	Win	17–0–6	Willie Patterson	PTS	8	Sep 3, 1924	Folly Theater, Baltimore, Maryland, U.S.	
22	Win	16–0–6	Jack Buckey	KO	4 (8)	Aug 13, 1924	Maryland Ball Park, Baltimore, Maryland, U.S.	
21	Win	15–0–6	Jack Ryan	PTS	8	Jun 25, 1924	Gayety Theater, Baltimore, Maryland, U.S.	
20	Win	14–0–6	Johnny Conroy	TKO	3 (6)	Jun 13, 1924	Carlin's Park, Baltimore, Maryland, U.S.	
19	Draw	13–0–6	Willie Patterson	PTS	6	Jun 4, 1924	Gayety Theater, Baltimore, Maryland, U.S.	
18	Win	13–0–5	Lou Guglielmini	PTS	6	May 26, 1924	Ben Franklin Arena, Kenilworth, Maryland, U.S.	
17	Win	12–0–5	Charles Barber	TKO	5 (8)	Apr 23, 1924	Gayety Theater, Baltimore, Maryland, U.S.	
16	Draw	11–0–5	Charles Barber	PTS	8	Apr 9, 1924	Gayety Theater, Baltimore, Maryland, U.S.	
15	Draw	11–0–4	Charles Barber	PTS	8	Apr 4, 1924	Folly Theater, Baltimore, Maryland, U.S.	
14	Win	11–0–3	Jack Buckey	PTS	6	Mar 14, 1924	Folly Theater, Baltimore, Maryland, U.S.	
13	Draw	10–0–3	Charles Barber	PTS	6	Feb 27, 1924	Gayety Theater, Baltimore, Maryland, U.S.	
12	Draw	10–0–2	Charles Barber	PTS	6	Feb 15, 1924	Folly Theater, Baltimore, Maryland, U.S.	
11	Win	10–0–1	Lew McCarthy	TKO	3 (6)	Feb 1, 1924	Folly Theater, Baltimore, Maryland, U.S.	
10	Win	9–0–1	Lew McCarthy	PTS	6	Jan 9, 1924	Gayety Theater, Baltimore, Maryland, U.S.	
9	Win	8–0–1	Lew McCarthy	PTS	4	Dec 28, 1923	Folly Theater, Baltimore, Maryland, U.S.	
8	Win	7–0–1	Jimmy Hogan	PTS	4	Dec 14, 1923	Folly Theater, Baltimore, Maryland, U.S.	
7	Win	6–0–1	Young Mickey	KO	2 (6)	Nov 30, 1923	Folly Theater, Baltimore, Maryland, U.S.	
6	Win	5–0–1	Young Kilbane	KO	2 (4)	Nov 21, 1923	Gayety Theater, Baltimore, Maryland, U.S.	
5	Win	4–0–1	Harlem Pete Kelly	PTS	4	Nov 14, 1923	Gayety Theater, Baltimore, Maryland, U.S.	
4	Draw	3–0–1	Dave Rogers	PTS	4	Nov 2, 1923	Folly Theater, Baltimore, Maryland, U.S.	
3	Win	3–0	Phil Herman	PTS	4	Oct 17, 1923	Gayety Theater, Baltimore, Maryland, U.S.	
2	Win	2–0	Harlem Pete Kelly	PTS	4	Sep 26, 1923	Gayety Theater, Baltimore, Maryland, U.S.	
1	Win	1–0	Mickey White	PTS	4	Sep 19, 1923	Gayety Theater, Baltimore, Maryland, U.S.	

== Titles in boxing ==
=== Major world titles ===
- NYSAC middleweight champion (160 lbs)
- NBA (WBA) middleweight champion (160 lbs)

=== Undisputed titles ===
- Undisputed middleweight champion

Awards and achievements
Preceded by Lou Brouillard	NYSAC World Middleweight Champion; October 30, 1933 – September 11, 1934	Succeeded by Teddy Yarosz
Preceded by Lou Brouillard	NBA World Middleweight Champion; October 30, 1933 – September 11, 1934	Succeeded by Teddy Yarosz
