= Ben Jeby =

American boxer (1909–1985)

Personal information
- Nationality: American
- Born: Benjamin Morris Jebaltowsky; 27 December 1909 Lower East Side, New York
- Died: 5 October 1985 (aged 75) New York, New York
- Height: 5 ft 10 in (1.78 m)
- Weight: Middleweight

Boxing career
- Reach: 5 ft 10 in (1.78 m)
- Stance: Orthodox

Boxing record
- Total fights: 73
- Wins: 54
- Win by KO: 22
- Losses: 14
- Draws: 4
- No contests: 1

Ben Jeby (born Benjamin Morris Jebaltowsky; December 27, 1909 – October 5, 1985), was an American world champion middleweight boxer from the Lower East Side of New York City. He was managed by the legendary Hymie Caplin.

== Early life and career ==
Jeby was born on December 27, 1909, near Clinton and Delancey Streets in New York's teaming Lower East side to Jewish parents.

He turned professional in 1927, at the age of 19.

He defeated Joey LaGrey in an eight-round points decision on August 19, 1930, in at Queensboro Stadium in Long Island. Harry Ebbets fell to Jeby in a ten-round points decision at Madison Square Garden on November 14, 1930. There were no knockdowns in the bout.

He drew in ten rounds with Dave Shade, the division's number one contender, on September 8, 1931, at Queensboro Stadium. In the close bout, Jeby had an edge in the third, fourth, and final three rounds. The following month he lost to Shade in a twelve-round unanimous decision at New York's Madison Square Garden.

Jeby would become one of several Jewish title-holders of the time. On March 20, 1931, weighing 157.5 pounds, he defeated Len Harvey on points over 12 rounds in a unanimous decision at Madison Square Garden in New York City. Jeby fought a rushing, mauling, body punching battle, at close range, for which Harvey had no answer. His attempts to clinch were inadequate to stop the onrush of Jeby.

My Sullivan fell to Jeby from a technical knockout in the ninth at Chicago Stadium before a crowd of 11,000 on February 26, 1932. Sullivan had built a substantial lead in the early rounds, but Jeby got to him with both hands in the later rounds, finally leaving him helpless on the ropes in the ninth.

He had a difficult loss to Frank Battaglia in a first-round knockout at Chicago Stadium on March 18, 1932. The knockout loss, which came 1:30 into the first round, discouraged Jeby, but ultimately did not affect his plans to pursue the World Middleweight title. The two would meet again.

Chick Devlin fell soundly to Jeby in a fifteen-round points decision at New York's St. Nicholas Arena on November 21, 1932. The fifteen-round decision for Jeby upheld his contention hopes for the Middleweight title.

== NYSAC World Middle champion ==
From 1932 to 1933, Jeby was the New York Boxing Commission Middleweight Champion of the World. Jeby defeated Canadian Frankie Battaglia, viewed as one of the world's best middleweights, by TKO at Madison Square Garden in a title fight on January 13, 1933. In the twelfth round, referee Jack Britton stopped the fighting due to a cut on Battaglia's eye. The injury was caused by a left hook from Jeby in the third round. Battaglia was down for a count of nine in the second.

He defeated Paul Pirrone on January 30, 1933, in a sixth-round technical knockout in Cleveland. The quarterfinal match was for the NYSAC's World Middleweight Tournament. A crowd of 8,400 saw Jeby drop Pirrone seven times before the bout was stopped in the sixth.

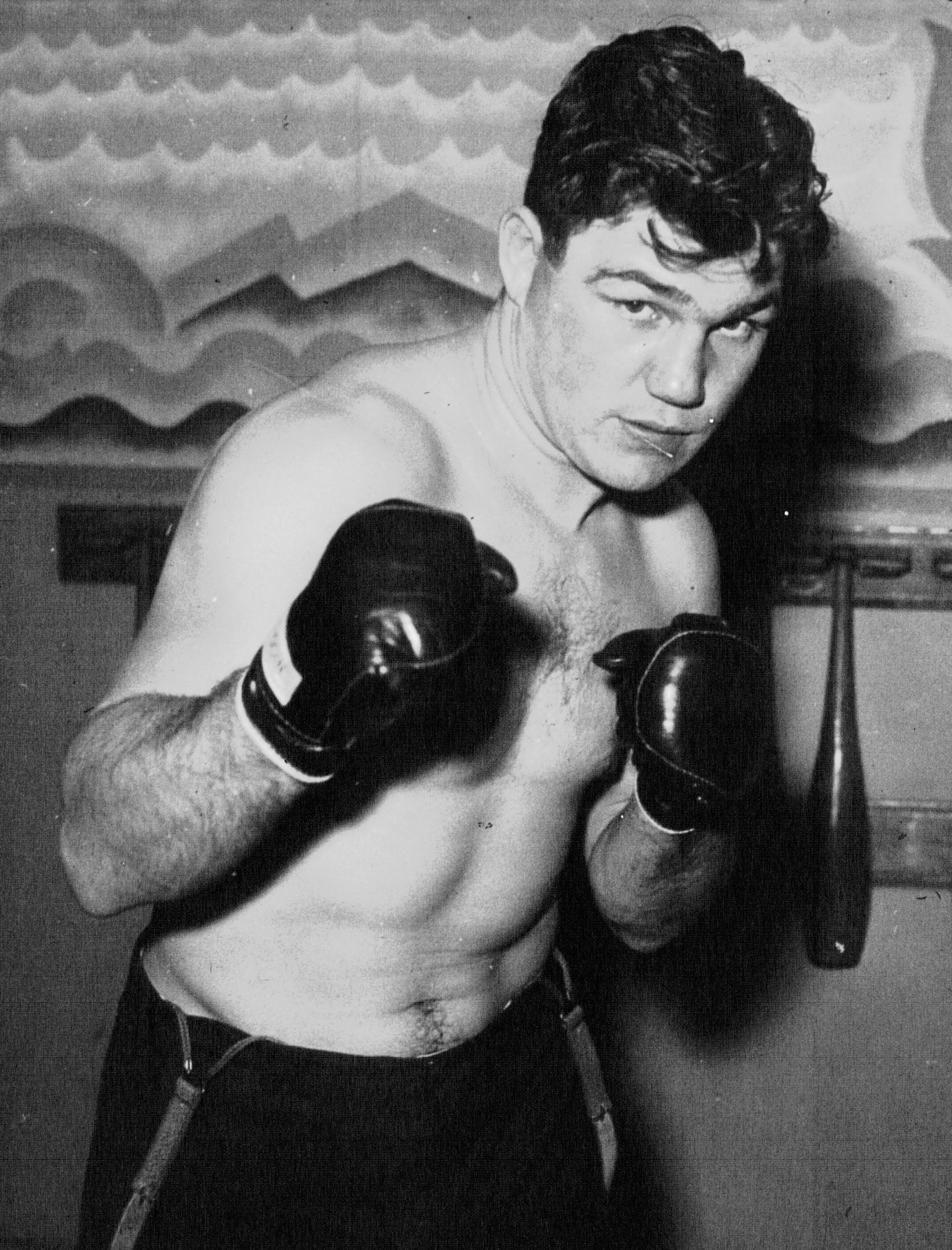
Lou Brouillard circa 1935

Jeby fought Vince Dundee to a draw over 15 rounds, keeping his title, at Madison Square Garden on March 17, 1933. The crowd of 11,000 felt strongly that Dundee had won the bout and reacted with derision to the draw ruling. Jeby, who had twice previously lost to Dundee, looked far worse than his opponent at the end of the bout.

Young Terry fell to Jeby in an NYSAC Middleweight Title bout at Dreamland Park in New Jersey in a fifteen-round points decision on July 10, 1933. Terry mounted a bristling two-fisted attack in the final two rounds that had many in the crowd of 12,052 unhappy with the final decision for Jeby. Jeby won six, Terry five, and four were even.

=== Loss of World middle title, August, 1933 ===
On August 9, 1933, he was knocked out by Lou Brouillard in the seventh round of a scheduled 15-round title fight at the Polo Grounds, surrendering his NYSAC World Middleweight title. Although only twenty-five at the time, Jeby's career began to falter after the loss of his title.

On April 6, 1934, he lost to Teddy Yarosz in a twelve-round points decision in Pittsburgh. The bout was a title match for the Pennsylvania version of the World Middleweight Title. Yarosz's powerful right continually assaulted Jeby with devastating results, but Jeby managed to hold off a knockout. The Pittsburgh Press credited Yarosz with nine rounds, with only one to Jeby.

In 73 bouts, he was 54–14 with 22 knockouts.

== Life after boxing ==
After he retired from the ring, Jeby obtained a plumber's license and worked in that field the rest of his life. He died on October 5, 1985, in New York, and was survived by wife Evelyn Siedman, a former chorus line dancer.

== Professional boxing record ==
73 fights	54 wins	14 losses
By knockout	22	2
By decision	32	12
Draws	4	
No contests	1	

No.	Result	Record	Opponent	Type	Round	Date	Location	Notes
73	Win	54–14–4 (1)	Jackie Aldare	PTS	8	Jul 15, 1934	Coney Island Velodrome, New York City, New York, U.S.	
72	Win	53–14–4 (1)	Al Cocozza	TKO	2 (10)	Jul 1, 1934	Queensboro Arena, Long Island City, New York City, New York, U.S.	
71	Loss	52–14–4 (1)	Swede Berglund	PTS	10	Jun 20, 1934	Civic Auditorium, San Francisco, California, U.S.	
70	Win	52–13–4 (1)	Anson Green	UD	10	Apr 27, 1934	Duquesne Garden, Pittsburgh, Pennsylvania, U.S.	
69	Loss	51–13–4 (1)	Teddy Yarosz	PTS	12	Apr 6, 1934	Duquesne Garden, Pittsburgh, Pennsylvania, U.S.	For Pennsylvania State middleweight title
68	Loss	51–12–4 (1)	Vince Dundee	MD	10	Feb 16, 1934	Chicago Stadium, Chicago, Illinois, U.S.	
67	Loss	51–11–4 (1)	Al Diamond	PTS	10	Feb 8, 1934	Armory, Paterson, New Jersey, U.S.	
66	Loss	51–10–4 (1)	Young Terry	PTS	10	Jan 3, 1934	Arena, Trenton, New Jersey, U.S.	
65	Win	51–9–4 (1)	Joey LaGrey	PTS	10	Nov 17, 1933	Madison Square Garden, New York City, New York, U.S.	
64	Win	50–9–4 (1)	Al Rossi	PTS	10	Nov 9, 1933	Arena, New Haven, Connecticut, U.S.	
63	Win	49–9–4 (1)	Joey LaGrey	PTS	10	Sep 5, 1933	Dreamland Park, Newark, New Jersey, U.S.	
62	Loss	48–9–4 (1)	Lou Brouillard	KO	7 (15)	Aug 9, 1933	Polo Grounds, New York City, New York, U.S.	Lost NYSAC middleweight title
61	Win	48–8–4 (1)	Young Terry	PTS	15	Jul 10, 1933	Dreamland Park, Newark, New Jersey, U.S.	Retained NYSAC middleweight title
60	Win	47–8–4 (1)	Al Rossi	PTS	12	Jun 2, 1933	Fugazy Bowl, New York City, New York, U.S.	
59	NC	46–8–4 (1)	Gorilla Jones	NC	6 (12)	Apr 19, 1933	Public Hall, Cleveland, Ohio, U.S.	The Cleveland Boxing Commissioners ordered Block to halt the fight due to the lack of effort from both fighters
58	Draw	46–8–4	Vince Dundee	PTS	15	Mar 17, 1933	Madison Square Garden, New York City, New York, U.S.	Retained NYSAC middleweight title
57	Win	46–8–3	Paul Pirrone	TKO	6 (12)	Jan 30, 1933	Public Hall, Cleveland, Ohio, U.S.	
56	Win	45–8–3	Frank Battaglia	TKO	12 (15)	Jan 13, 1933	Madison Square Garden, New York City, New York, U.S.	Won vacant NYSAC middleweight title
55	Win	44–8–3	Chick Devlin	PTS	15	Nov 21, 1932	St. Nicholas Arena, New York City, New York, U.S.	
54	Win	43–8–3	Paul Pirrone	TKO	6 (10)	Oct 13, 1932	Madison Square Garden, New York City, New York, U.S.	
53	Win	42–8–3	Nick Palmer	TKO	4 (10)	Aug 19, 1932	Coney Island Stadium, New York City, New York, U.S.	
52	Win	41–8–3	Leo Larrivee	KO	1 (8)	Aug 4, 1932	Yankee Stadium, New York City, New York, U.S.	
51	Win	40–8–3	Roscoe Manning	PTS	10	Jul 21, 1932	Belmont Park, Garfield, New Jersey, U.S.	
50	Win	39–8–3	Billy Kohut	TKO	3 (6)	Jul 15, 1932	Long Beach Stadium, Long Beach, New York, U.S.	
49	Loss	38–8–3	Frank Battaglia	KO	1 (10)	Mar 18, 1932	Chicago Stadium, Chicago, Illinois, U.S.	
48	Win	38–7–3	Babe Marshall	TKO	9 (10)	Feb 26, 1932	Chicago Stadium, Chicago, Illinois, U.S.	
47	Win	37–7–3	Babe Marshall	TKO	4 (10)	Feb 22, 1932	Laurel Garden, Newark, New Jersey, U.S.	
46	Win	36–7–3	Al Lamont	KO	2 (6)	Jan 4, 1932	Jamaica Arena, Jamaica, New York City, New York, U.S.	
45	Win	35–7–3	Eddie Whalen	KO	3 (8)	Dec 29, 1931	Elks Lodge 22, New York City, New York, U.S.	
44	Win	34–7–3	Jackie Aldare	PTS	8	Dec 12, 1931	Ridgewood Grove, New York City, New York, U.S.	
43	Win	33–7–3	Buck McTiernan	TKO	7 (10)	Nov 9, 1931	Motor Square Garden, Pittsburgh, Pennsylvania, U.S.	
42	Win	32–7–3	Charley Horn	KO	6 (6)	Oct 26, 1931	Jamaica Arena, Jamaica, New York City, New York, U.S.	
41	Loss	31–7–3	Dave Shade	UD	12	Oct 2, 1931	Madison Square Garden, New York City, New York, U.S.	
40	Draw	31–6–3	Dave Shade	PTS	10	Sep 8, 1931	Queensboro Stadium, Long Island City, New York City, New York, U.S.	
39	Draw	31–6–2	Pete August	PTS	10	Aug 24, 1931	Dreamland Park, Newark, New Jersey, U.S.	
38	Win	31–6–1	Ignacio Ara	PTS	10	Jul 23, 1931	Queensboro Stadium, Long Island City, New York City, New York, U.S.	
37	Loss	30–6–1	Young Terry	PTS	10	Jun 29, 1931	Dreamland Park, Newark, New Jersey, U.S.	
36	Loss	30–5–1	Vince Dundee	PTS	10	Jun 4, 1931	Madison Square Garden, New York City, New York, U.S.	
35	Win	30–4–1	Johnny Pilc	UD	10	Apr 24, 1931	St. Nicholas Arena, New York City, New York, U.S.	
34	Win	29–4–1	Laddie Lee	KO	5 (10)	Apr 10, 1931	St. Nicholas Arena, New York City, New York, U.S.	
33	Win	28–4–1	Len Harvey	UD	12	Mar 20, 1931	Madison Square Garden, New York City, New York, U.S.	
32	Win	27–4–1	Battling Tracey	PTS	8	Feb 2, 1931	St. Nicholas Arena, New York City, New York, U.S.	
31	Win	26–4–1	Harry Ebbets	PTS	10	Nov 14, 1930	Madison Square Garden, New York City, New York, U.S.	
30	Win	25–4–1	Babe McCorgary	PTS	6	Sep 30, 1930	Broadway Arena, New York City, New York, U.S.	
29	Win	24–4–1	Joe Dundee	PTS	8	Sep 11, 1930	Yankee Stadium, New York City, New York, U.S.	
28	Win	23–4–1	Joey LaGrey	PTS	8	Aug 19, 1930	Queensboro Stadium, Long Island City, New York City, New York, U.S.	
27	Win	22–4–1	Dennis Golden	TKO	6 (6)	Aug 1, 1930	Long Beach Stadium, Long Beach, New York, U.S.	
26	Loss	21–4–1	Vince Dundee	PTS	10	Apr 4, 1930	Madison Square Garden, New York City, New York, U.S.	
25	Win	21–3–1	Floyd Hybert	KO	1 (6)	Mar 22, 1930	Ridgewood Grove, New York City, New York, U.S.	
24	Win	20–3–1	Floyd Hybert	PTS	6	Mar 8, 1930	Ridgewood Grove, New York City, New York, U.S.	
23	Win	19–3–1	Billy Franklin	PTS	10	Feb 17, 1930	St. Nicholas Arena, New York City, New York, U.S.	
22	Win	18–3–1	Joey LaGrey	PTS	6	Dec 30, 1929	St. Nicholas Arena, New York City, New York, U.S.	
21	Win	17–3–1	Tony Vaccarelli	PTS	10	Nov 18, 1929	St. Nicholas Arena, New York City, New York, U.S.	
20	Win	16–3–1	Alf Ros	PTS	10	Oct 11, 1929	Madison Square Garden, New York City, New York, U.S.	
19	Win	15–3–1	Nick Palmer	KO	8 (10)	Sep 18, 1929	Queensboro Stadium, Long Island City, New York City, New York, U.S.	
18	Win	14–3–1	Joe Salino	PTS	10	Aug 13, 1929	Queensboro Stadium, Long Island City, New York City, New York, U.S.	
17	Win	13–3–1	Jackie Horner	PTS	8	Jul 23, 1929	Queensboro Stadium, Long Island City, New York City, New York, U.S.	
16	Win	12–3–1	Charlie Rosen	PTS	10	Jul 2, 1929	Queensboro Stadium, Long Island City, New York City, New York, U.S.	
15	Loss	11–3–1	Alf Ros	PTS	10	Jun 6, 1929	New York Coliseum, New York City, New York, U.S.	
14	Loss	11–2–1	Cecil Harper	PTS	10	Mar 15, 1929	Madison Square Garden, New York City, New York, U.S.	
13	Win	11–1–1	Cecil Harper	TKO	2 (8)	Feb 1, 1929	Madison Square Garden, New York City, New York, U.S.	
12	Win	10–1–1	Cecil Harper	KO	3 (6)	Jan 18, 1929	Madison Square Garden, New York City, New York, U.S.	
11	Win	9–1–1	Elky Miller	KO	2 (6)	Jan 7, 1929	Ridgewood Grove, New York City, New York, U.S.	
10	Win	8–1–1	Justin Hoffman	PTS	4	Dec 22, 1928	Ridgewood Grove, New York City, New York, U.S.	
9	Win	7–1–1	Jack Kiernan	PTS	6	Dec 3, 1928	St. Nicholas Arena, New York City, New York, U.S.	
8	Win	6–1–1	Joe Spatola	KO	4 (6)	Nov 16, 1928	Madison Square Garden, New York City, New York, U.S.	
7	Win	5–1–1	Howard Reddy	PTS	4	Oct 22, 1928	St. Nicholas Arena, New York City, New York, U.S.	
6	Win	4–1–1	Frank Buchanan	PTS	4	Oct 20, 1928	Ridgewood Grove, New York City, New York, U.S.	
5	Win	3–1–1	Benny Bonavita	KO	3 (4)	Oct 6, 1928	Ridgewood Grove, New York City, New York, U.S.	
4	Loss	2–1–1	George Daggett	PTS	4	Oct 4, 1927	St. Nicholas Arena, New York City, New York, U.S.	
3	Draw	2–0–1	Jimmy O'Hara	PTS	4	Sep 29, 1927	Columbus Hall, Yonkers, New York, U.S.	
2	Win	2–0	Frankie Bartels	PTS	4	Sep 24, 1927	Ridgewood Grove, New York City, New York, U.S.	
1	Win	1–0	Sammy Schneider	PTS	4	Sep 3, 1927	Ridgewood Grove, New York City, New York, U.S.	

== See also ==
- List of select Jewish boxers
