= Lou Brouillard =

Canadian boxer (1911–1984)

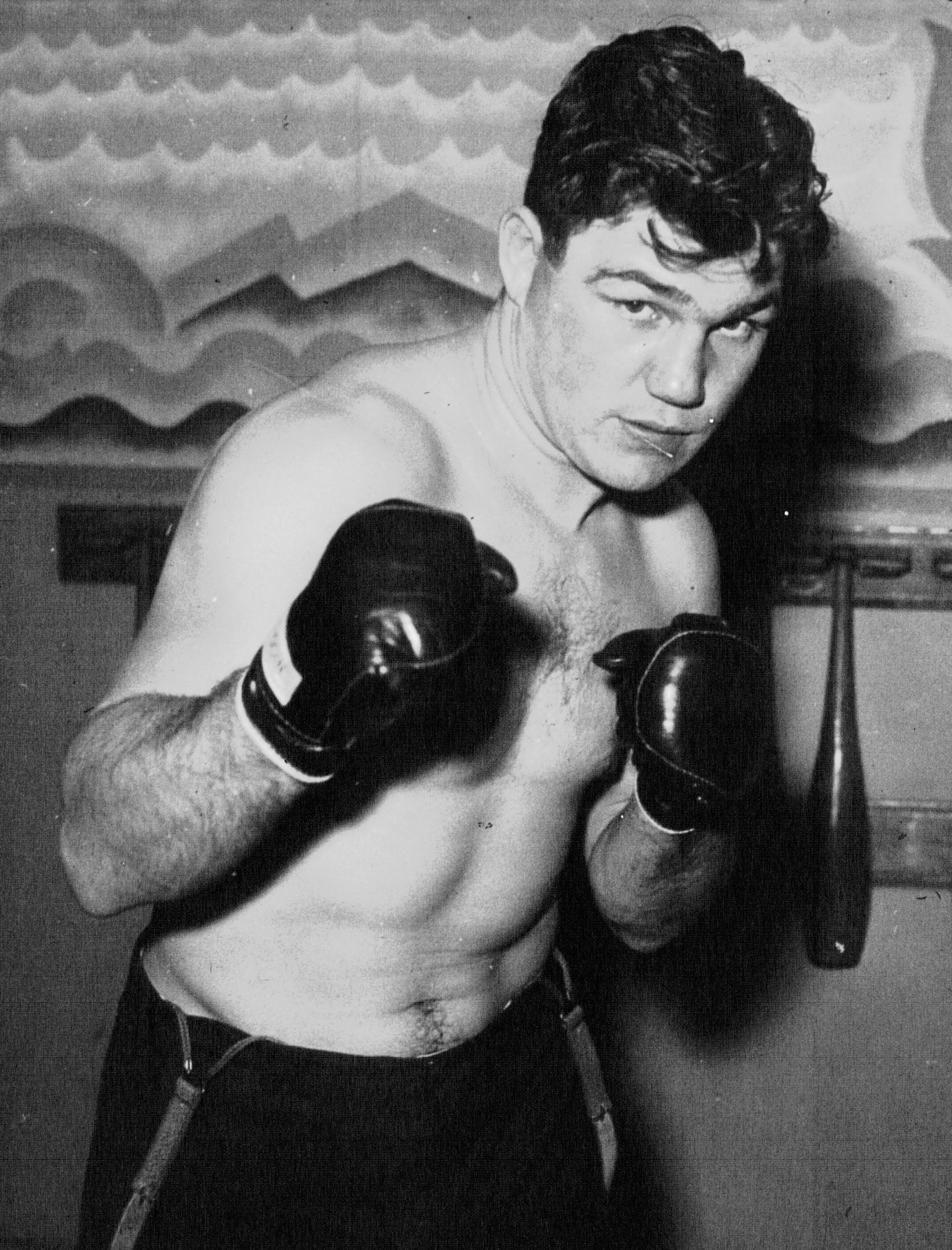

Personal information
- Nationality: Canadian
- Born: Lucien Pierre Brouillard; May 23, 1911 Saint-Eugène, Quebec, Canada
- Died: September 14, 1984 (aged 73)
- Height: 5 ft 7 in (1.70 m)
- Weight: Welterweight; Middleweight

Boxing career
- Reach: 72 in (183 cm)
- Stance: Southpaw

Boxing record
- Total fights: 135
- Wins: 101
- Win by KO: 57
- Losses: 31
- Draws: 3

Lucien Pierre Brouillard, better known as Lou Brouillard (May 23, 1911 – September 14, 1984), was a Canadian professional boxer who held the Undisputed World Welterweight and Undisputed World Middleweight Titles. Statistical boxing website BoxRec ranks Brouillard as the 14th best middleweight of all-time and the 3rd best Canadian boxer ever. During his career he faced the likes of Mickey Walker, Young Corbett III, Jimmy McLarnin, Marcel Thil, and Fred Apostoli. Brouillard was inducted into the World Boxing Hall of Fame in 2000 and the International Boxing Hall of Fame in 2006.

== Boxing career ==
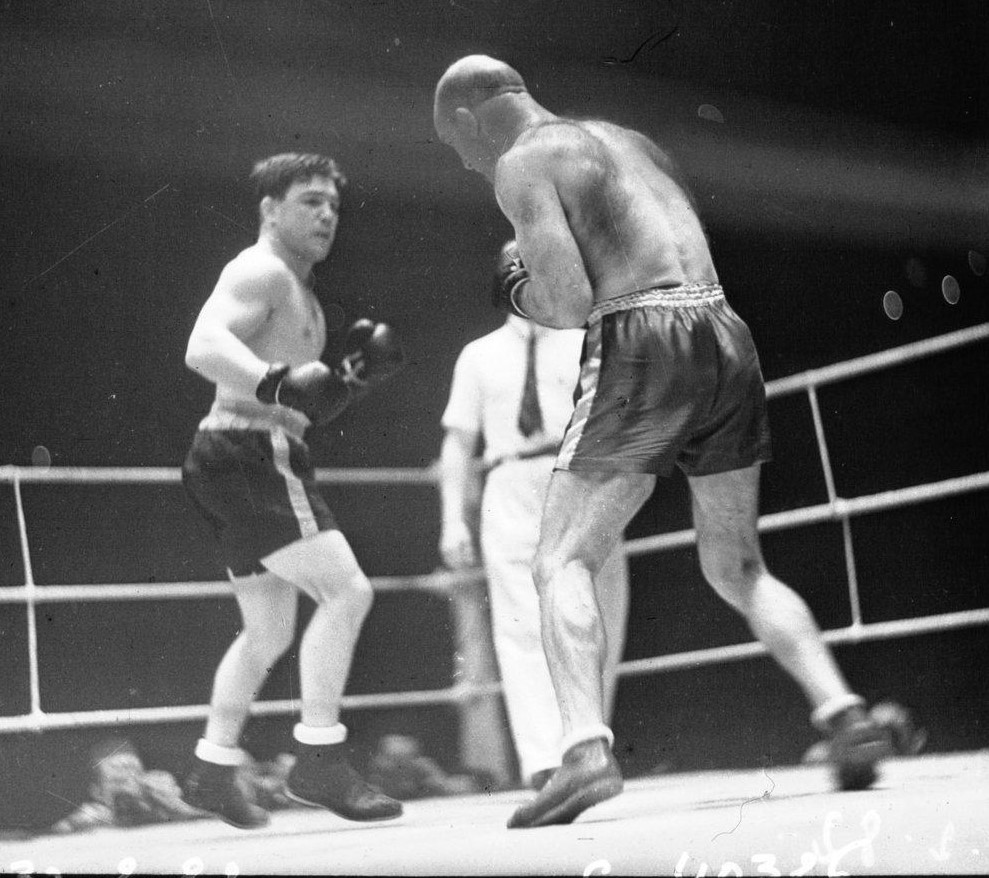
Brouillard (left) during his third bout with Marcel Thil

=== World welterweight champion ===
According to an "Oddities of the Sports World" newspaper column of Sept. 23, 1931, Brouillard started as a right-handed boxer. Early on, however, he broke some rib bones on his right side, hampering his ability to hit with his right hand. He therefore converted to a southpaw.

Brouillard turned pro in 1928 and racked up an impressive 61-7 record before his was given a title shot by Jack Thompson for the World Welterweight title. On October 23, 1931, after knocking down Thompson four times during the course of the bout, Brouillard was awarded the unanimous decision and emerged as the new titleholder. However, he would lose the title during his first defense just a few months later on January 28, 1932 to Jackie Fields.

=== NYSAC middleweight champion ===
On August 4, 1932, Brouillard bested future Hall of Famer Jimmy McLarnin via split decision in a non-title bout. In 1933 he beat another all-time great in Mickey Walker via unanimous decision over 10 rounds.

On August 9, 1933, he won the NYSAC World Middleweight Title by defeating Ben Jeby by KO at the Polo Grounds in New York. After being jointly recognized as champion by the National Boxing Association, he lost the title in his first defense against Vince Dundee via unanimous decision later that year.

=== Later career ===
After beating yet another Hall of Famer in Young Corbett III, Brouillard travelled to France to square of against Marcel Thil on November 25, 1935. Although he lost a 12-round unanimous decision, Brouillard put up a stiff challenge and was given the opportunity to rematch Thil; this time with his IBU Middleweight title on the line. Brouillard faced Thil twice more, each time being disqualified after the reigning champion fell to the ground clutching his groin.

Brouillard fought well past the age of optimal retirement, losing 10 of his last 27 fights. Despite his lack of success, he continued facing world-class opposition; including Teddy Yarosz, Gus Lesnevich, and Lloyd Marshall. Brouillard retired after a 10-round majority decision loss to Henry Chmielewski on January 12, 1940.

He died on 14 September 1984 and is buried in Halifax Town Cemetery in Halifax, Massachusetts.

== Professional boxing record ==
All information in this section is derived from BoxRec, unless otherwise stated.

=== Official Record ===
135 fights	100 wins	31 losses
By knockout	57	1
By decision	42	27
By disqualification	1	3
Draws	2	
Newspaper decisions/draws	2	

All newspaper decisions are officially regarded as “no decision” bouts and are not counted to the win/loss/draw column.

No.	Result	Record	Opponent	Type	Round(s)	Date	Location	Note
135	Loss	100–31–2 (2)	Henry Chmielewski	MD	10	Jan 12, 1940	Mechanics Hall, Worcester, Connecticut, U.S.	
134	Loss	100–30–2 (2)	Lloyd Marshall	UD	10	Dec 6, 1939	Auditorium, Oakland, California, U.S.	
133	Loss	100–29–2 (2)	Frankie Britt	SD	12	Nov 9, 1939	Casino, Fall River, Massachusetts, U.S.	
132	Loss	100–28–2 (2)	Howell King	PTS	10	Sep 29, 1939	Mechanics Hall, Worcester, Connecticut, U.S.	
131	Win	100–27–2 (2)	Al Sinibaldi	NWS	10	Aug 17, 1939	Portland, Maine, U.S.	
130	Draw	100–27–2 (1)	Jackie Elverrillo	NWS	10	Jul 13, 1939	Exposition Building, Portland, Maine, U.S.	
129	Loss	100–27–2	Georgie Abrams	PTS	10	Jun 20, 1939	Griffith Stadium, Washington, D.C., U.S.	
128	Win	100–26–2	Henry Chmielewski	UD	10	Jun 2, 1939	Mechanics Hall, Worcester, Connecticut, U.S.	
127	Loss	99–26–2	Anton Christoforidis	PTS	10	Apr 5, 1939	Palais des Sports, Paris, Paris, France	
126	Draw	99–25–2	Edouard Tenet	PTS	10	Mar 17, 1939	Palais des Sports, Paris, Paris, France	
125	Win	99–25–1	Johnny Rossi	TKO	10 (12)	Dec 30, 1938	Mechanics Hall, Worcester, Connecticut, U.S.	
124	Loss	98–25–1	Ray Miller	PTS	10	Nov 7, 1938	Laurel Garden, Newark, New Jersey, U.S.	
123	Win	98–24–1	Joe Glasgow	KO	6 (10)	Sep 23, 1938	Boston Garden, Boston, Massachusetts, U.S.	
122	Loss	97–24–1	Gus Lesnevich	PTS	10	Mar 23, 1938	Hippodrome, New York City, New York, U.S.	
121	Loss	97–23–1	Tiger Jack Fox	TKO	7 (10)	Feb 18, 1938	Boston Garden, Boston, Massachusetts, U.S.	
120	Win	97–22–1	Dick Maloney	PTS	12	Dec 10, 1937	Boston Garden, Boston, Massachusetts, U.S.	
119	Win	96–22–1	Roy Kelley	UD	12	Oct 22, 1937	Boston Garden, Boston, Massachusetts, U.S.	
118	Win	95–22–1	Tiger Roy Williams	KO	2 (10)	Sep 9, 1937	Exposition Building, Portland, Maine, U.S.	
117	Loss	94–22–1	Teddy Yarosz	PTS	10	Feb 15, 1937	Mechanics Building, Boston, Massachusetts, U.S.	
116	Loss	94–21–1	Marcel Thil	DQ	6 (15)	Feb 15, 1937	Palais des Sports, Paris, Paris, France, Paris, France	For IBU middleweight title
115	Win	94–20–1	Carl Knowles	PTS	10	Dec 4, 1936	Arena, New Haven, Connecticut, U.S.	
114	Loss	93–20–1	Fred Apostoli	PTS	10	Oct 9, 1936	Dreamland Auditorium, San Francisco, California, U.S.	
113	Win	93–19–1	Jack Ennis	KO	8 (15)	Jun 26, 1936	Worcester, Connecticut, U.S.	
112	Loss	92–19–1	Marcel Thil	DQ	4 (15)	Jan 20, 1936	Palais des Sports, Paris, Paris, France, Paris, France	For IBU and The Ring middleweight titles
111	Win	92–18–1	Gustave Roth	SD	15	Dec 20, 1935	Palais des Sports, Paris, Paris, France, Paris, France	
110	Loss	91–18–1	Marcel Thil	UD	12	Nov 25, 1935	Palais des Sports, Paris, Paris, France, Paris, France	
109	Loss	91–17–1	Al McCoy	UD	10	Sep 20, 1935	Boston Garden, Boston, Massachusetts, U.S.	
108	Win	91–16–1	Young Corbett III	PTS	10	Jul 4, 1935	Kezar Stadium, San Francisco, California, U.S.	
107	Win	90–16–1	Marty Simmons	UD	10	Apr 17, 1935	Motor Square Garden, Pittsburgh, Pennsylvania, U.S.	
106	Win	89–16–1	Swede Berglund	PTS	10	Mar 22, 1935	Legion Stadium, Hollywood, California, U.S.	
105	Win	88–16–1	Babe Marino	TKO	7 (10)	Mar 15, 1935	Dreamland Auditorium, San Francisco, California, U.S.	
104	Win	87–16–1	Indian Jimmy Rivers	TKO	4 (10)	Feb 5, 1935	Olympic Auditorium, Los Angeles, California, U.S.	
103	Win	86–16–1	Oscar Rankins	TKO	4 (10)	Jan 29, 1935	Olympic Auditorium, Los Angeles, California, U.S.	
102	Win	85–16–1	Sammy Slaughter	TKO	4 (10)	Dec 25, 1934	Duquesne Garden, Pittsburgh, Pennsylvania, U.S.	
101	Win	84–16–1	Al Gainer	MD	10	Nov 23, 1934	Madison Square Garden, New York City, New York, U.S.	
100	Loss	83–16–1	Tait Littman	PTS	10	Oct 8, 1934	Duquesne Garden, Pittsburgh, Pennsylvania, U.S.	
99	Win	83–15–1	Solly Dukelsky	TKO	7 (10)	Sep 7, 1934	Mills Stadium, Chicago, Illinois, U.S.	
98	Win	82–15–1	Anson Green	TKO	8 (10)	Aug 20, 1934	Hickey Park, Pittsburgh, Pennsylvania, U.S.	
97	Loss	81–15–1	Al Gainer	PTS	10	Jul 12, 1934	Donovan Field, West Haven, Connecticut, U.S.	
96	Win	81–14–1	Henry Firpo	KO	6 (10)	Jun 11, 1934	Providence, Rhode Island, U.S.	
95	Win	80–14–1	Norman Conrad	PTS	10	May 11, 1934	Worcester, Connecticut, U.S.	
94	Win	79–14–1	Bob Olin	PTS	10	Apr 5, 1934	Arena, New Haven, Connecticut, U.S.	
93	Win	78–14–1	Al Gainer	PTS	10	Mar 5, 1934	Arena, New Haven, Connecticut, U.S.	
92	Win	77–14–1	Tommy Rios	KO	5 (10)	Feb 16, 1934	Mechanics Hall, Worcester, Connecticut, U.S.	
91	Win	76–14–1	Bob Olin	SD	10	Jan 19, 1934	Madison Square Garden, New York City, New York, U.S.	
90	Loss	75–14–1	Tony Shucco	MD	10	Nov 24, 1933	Boston Garden, Boston, Massachusetts, U.S.	
89	Loss	75–13–1	Vince Dundee	UD	15	Oct 30, 1933	Boston Garden, Boston, Massachusetts, U.S.	Lost NYSAC and NBA middleweight titles
88	Win	75–12–1	Adolf Hueser	TKO	8 (10)	Sep 22, 1933	Boston Garden, Boston, Massachusetts, U.S.	
87	Win	74–12–1	Ben Jeby	KO	7 (15)	Aug 9, 1933	Polo Grounds, New York City, New York, U.S.	Won NYSAC middleweight title
86	Win	73–12–1	Mickey Walker	PTS	10	Jul 6, 1933	Boston Garden, Boston, Massachusetts, U.S.	
85	Win	72–12–1	Sammy Slaughter	UD	10	May 16, 1933	Arena, Boston, Massachusetts, U.S.	
84	Loss	71–12–1	Johnny Indrisano	MD	10	Feb 24, 1933	Boston Garden, Boston, Massachusetts, U.S.	
83	Win	71–11–1	Horacio Velha	UD	10	Jan 9, 1933	Valley Arena, Holyoke, Massachusetts, U.S.	
82	Loss	70–11–1	Jimmy Smith	PTS	10	Dec 19, 1932	Arena, Philadelphia, Pennsylvania, U.S.	
81	Loss	70–10–1	Andy Callahan	UD	10	Oct 7, 1932	Boston Garden, Boston, Massachusetts, U.S.	
80	Win	70–9–1	Ad Zachow	PTS	10	Sep 9, 1932	Boston Garden, Boston, Massachusetts, U.S.	
79	Win	69–9–1	Jimmy McLarnin	SD	10	Aug 4, 1932	Yankee Stadium, New York City, New York, U.S.	
78	Win	68–9–1	Henry Wallace	KO	2 (10)	Jun 15, 1932	Woonsocket, Rhode Island, U.S.	
77	Loss	67–9–1	Johnny Indrisano	UD	10	Apr 29, 1932	Boston Garden, Boston, Massachusetts, U.S.	
76	Win	67–8–1	Johnny Indrisano	SD	10	Apr 8, 1932	Boston Garden, Boston, Massachusetts, U.S.	
75	Win	66–8–1	George Manolian	PTS	10	May 31, 1932	Foot Guard Hall, Hartford, Connecticut, U.S.	
74	Loss	65–8–1	Jackie Fields	UD	10	Jan 28, 1932	Chicago, Stadium, Chicago, Illinois, U.S.	Lost NYSAC, NBA, and The Ring welterweight titles
73	Draw	65–7–1	Baby Joe Gans	PTS	10	Dec 15, 1931	Forum, Montreal, Quebec, Canada	
72	Win	65–7	Paul Pirrone	DQ	7 (10)	Dec 10, 1931	Public Hall, Cleveland, Ohio, U.S.	
71	Win	64–7	Bucky Lawless	KO	3 (10)	Dec 2, 1931	Boston Garden, Boston, Massachusetts, U.S.	
70	Win	63–7	Young Jack Thompson	UD	15	Oct 23, 1931	Boston Garden, Boston, Massachusetts, U.S.	Won NYSAC, NBA, and The Ring welterweight titles
69	Win	62–7	Jackie Brady	PTS	10	Aug 25, 1931	Cycledrome, Providence, Rhode Island, U.S.	
68	Win	61–7	Young Jack Thompson	UD	10	Jul 23, 1931	Boston Garden, Boston, Massachusetts, U.S.	
67	Win	60–7	Paul Pirrone	KO	8 (10)	Jun 9, 1931	Boston Garden, Boston, Massachusetts, U.S.	
66	Win	59–7	Al Mello	TKO	8 (10)	May 15, 1931	Boston Garden, Boston, Massachusetts, U.S.	Won USA New England middleweight title; Won USA New England welterweight title
65	Win	58–7	Eddie Moore	KO	2 (10)	May 1, 1931	Worcester, Connecticut, U.S.	
64	Win	57–7	Frankie Belanger	KO	1 (10)	Apr 27, 1931	Arena, Quebec City, Quebec, Canada	
63	Win	56–7	Al Koziol	TKO	5 (8)	Apr 17, 1931	Armory, Willimantic, Connecticut, U.S.	
62	Win	55–7	Canada Lee	PTS	10	Mar 27, 1931	Worcester, Connecticut, U.S.	
61	Win	54–7	Baby Joe Gans	PTS	10	Mar 6, 1931	Worcester, Connecticut, U.S.	
60	Win	53–7	Canada Lee	KO	10 (10)	Feb 13, 1931	Worcester, Connecticut, U.S.	
59	Win	52–7	Alf Ross	TKO	6 (8)	Feb 6, 1931	Boston Garden, Boston, Massachusetts, U.S.	
58	Win	51–7	Al Palladino	TKO	7 (10)	Jan 30, 1931	Worcester, Connecticut, U.S.	
57	Win	50–7	Gaby Bagdad	PTS	8	Jan 1, 1931	Arena, Boston, Massachusetts, U.S.	
56	Win	49–7	Larry Brignolia	TKO	3 (6)	Dec 15, 1930	Arena, Boston, Massachusetts, U.S.	
55	Win	48–7	Frank Baldi	TKO	4 (8)	Oct 17, 1930	Worcester, Connecticut, U.S.	
54	Win	47–7	Billy Eskowtiz	KO	2 (8)	Sep 26, 1930	Danielson, Connecticut, U.S.	
53	Loss	46–7	Jimmy McGonnigle	DQ	5 (10)	Sep 25, 1930	Wilson Recreation Park, Keene, New Hampshire, U.S.	
52	Win	46–6	Nick Madonna	PTS	10	Aug 28, 1930	Wilson Recreation Park, Keene, New Hampshire, U.S.	
51	Win	45–6	Tony Travers	TKO	4 (10)	Aug 21, 1930	St. Michael's Arena, Pawcatuck, Connecticut, U.S.	
50	Win	44–6	Bobby Suber	PTS	10	Jul 3, 1930	Wilson Recreation Park, Keene, New Hampshire, U.S.	
49	Win	43–6	Rudy Marshall	PTS	8	Jul 2, 1930	St. Michael's Arena, Pawcatuck, Connecticut, U.S.	
48	Win	42–6	Joe Emmons	KO	4 (8)	Jun 11, 1930	Shymas Hall, Taftville, Connecticut, U.S.	
47	Win	41–6	Clyde Hull	PTS	10	May 9, 1930	Worcester, Connecticut, U.S.	
46	Win	40–6	Tony Magna	KO	3 (8)	Mar 23, 1930	Mechanics Hall, Worcester, Connecticut, U.S.	
45	Win	39–6	Owen Travers	TKO	6 (8)	Mar 4, 1930	Mechanics Hall, Worcester, Connecticut, U.S.	
44	Win	38–6	Mule Brown	PTS	8	Mar 28, 1930	Parish Hall, Taftville, Connecticut, U.S.	
43	Win	37–6	Joe Garvey	TKO	5 (8)	Mar 21, 1930	Mechanics Hall, Worcester, Connecticut, U.S.	
42	Win	36–6	Art Hurd	PTS	8	Mar 14, 1930	Lyceum Theatre, New London, Connecticut, U.S.	
41	Win	35–6	Eddie Reed	PTS	8	Feb 28, 1930	Lyceum Theatre, New London, Connecticut, U.S.	
40	Win	34–6	Billy Carney	TKO	6 (8)	Feb 21, 1930	Danielson, Connecticut, U.S.	
39	Win	33–6	Joe Rossi	KO	2 (8)	Feb 14, 1930	Parish Hall, Taftville, Connecticut, U.S.	
38	Win	32–6	Charlie Phippen	TKO	4 (8)	Feb 7, 1930	Worcester, Connecticut, U.S.	
37	Win	31–6	Stanley Reid	TKO	7 (8)	Jan 31, 1930	Town Hall, Danielson, Connecticut, U.S.	
36	Win	30–6	Artie Lee	PTS	8	Jan 24, 1930	Armory, New London, Connecticut, U.S.	
35	Win	29–6	Joe Russo	KO	3 (8)	Jan 17, 1930	Armory, New London, Connecticut, U.S.	
34	Win	28–6	Stanley Reid	TKO	6 (8)	Jan 1, 1930	Mechanics Hall, Worcester, Connecticut, U.S.	
33	Win	27–6	Joe Russo	KO	5 (8)	Dec 6, 1929	Parish Hall, Taftville, Connecticut, U.S.	
32	Win	26–6	Jimmy Hoag	TKO	6 (8)	Nov 22, 1929	Mechanics Hall, Worcester, Connecticut, U.S.	
31	Loss	25–6	Eddie Moore	PTS	8	Oct 17, 1929	Rakoczi Hall, Bridgeport, Connecticut, U.S.	
30	Win	25–5	Len Smith	TKO	5 (6)	Oct 9, 1929	Forum, Montreal, Quebec, Canada	
29	Loss	24–5	Jack Manley	PTS	10	Oct 3, 1929	State Armory, Keene, New Hampshire, U.S.	
28	Win	24–4	Bob Allison	KO	2 (6)	Sep 25, 1929	Forum, Montreal, Quebec, Canada	
27	Win	23–4	Rudy Marshall	TKO	5 (8)	Sep 19, 1929	Newfield Park, Bridgeport, Connecticut, U.S., Connecticut, U.S.	
26	Win	22–4	Bert Heathfield	KO	2 (6)	Sep 11, 1929	Forum, Montreal, Quebec, Canada	
25	Win	21–4	Jack Dugey	PTS	8	Sep 5, 1929	Ware's Grove Pavilion, Lake Spofford, New Hampshire, U.S.	
24	Win	20–4	Tom Quigley	TKO	5 (8)	Aug 23, 1929	Fairgrounds, Worcester, Connecticut, U.S.	
23	Win	19–4	Eddie Moore	PTS	8	Aug 15, 1929	Newfield Park, Bridgeport, Connecticut, U.S., Connecticut, U.S.	
22	Win	18–4	Harry Lagess	PTS	8	Jun 25, 1929	Ware's Grove Pavilion, Lake Spofford, New Hampshire, U.S.	
21	Win	17–4	Bill Lozeau	TKO	3 (6)	Jun 13, 1929	Summer Street Baseball Park, Fitchburg	
20	Win	16–4	Eddie Desautels	PTS	10	Jun 13, 1929	Lake Spofford, New Hampshire, U.S.	
19	Win	15–4	Al Bergeron	KO	7 (8)	Jun 7, 1929	Fairgrounds, Worcester, Connecticut, U.S.	
18	Win	14–4	Eddie Daley	TKO	4 (8)	May 31, 1929	Ware's Grove Pavilion, Lake Spofford, New Hampshire, U.S.	
17	Win	13–4	Dick Pangraze	TKO	3 (?)	May 24, 1929	Nashua Theatre, Nashua, New Hampshire, U.S.	
16	Win	12–4	Bill Lozeau	TKO	5 (10)	May 7, 1929	Nashua Theatre, Nashua, New Hampshire, U.S.	
15	Win	11–4	Young Johnny Buff	KO	2 (8)	Apr 23, 1929	Nashua Theatre, Nashua, New Hampshire, U.S.	
14	Loss	10–4	Scoops White	PTS	8	Apr 19, 1929	Worcester, Connecticut, U.S.	
13	Loss	10–3	Sam Lucci	PTS	8	Mar 15, 1929	Worcester, Connecticut, U.S.	
12	Win	10–2	Vic Morley	PTS	6	Mar 7, 1929	Foot Guard Hall, Hartford, Connecticut, U.S.	
11	Win	9–2	Al Sacco	KO	2 (6)	Feb 28, 1929	Mechanics Hall, Worcester, Connecticut, U.S.	
10	Loss	8–2	Young Angelo	PTS	6	Feb 21, 1929	Buckingham Hall, Waterbury, Connecticut, U.S.	
9	Win	8–1	Young Gaboury	KO	2 (6)	Feb 15, 1929	Mechanics Hall, Worcester, Connecticut, U.S.	
8	Win	7–1	Billy Rhodes	KO	3 (6)	Jan 18, 1929	Mechanics Hall, Worcester, Connecticut, U.S.	
7	Loss	6–1	George Lawson	PTS	6	Oct 4, 1928	Brassco Park, Waterbury, Connecticut, U.S.	
6	Win	6–0	Sammy Kraft	PTS	4	Sep 21, 1928	Brassco Park, Waterbury, Connecticut, U.S.	
5	Win	5–0	Benny Edwards	KO	4 (6)	Aug 30, 1928	Brassco Park, Waterbury, Connecticut, U.S.	
4	Win	4–0	Zeke Mazer	PTS	4	Aug 27, 1928	Velodrome, Hartford, Connecticut, U.S.	
3	Win	3–0	Mickey Mullins	TKO	5 (6)	Aug 16, 1928	Brassco Park, Waterbury, Connecticut, U.S.	
2	Win	2–0	Mickey Mullins	KO	3 (4)	Jul 12, 1928	Elks Park, Willimantic, Connecticut, U.S.	
1	Win	1–0	Billy Krake	KO	1 (4)	Jun 28, 1928	Elks Park, Willimantic, Connecticut, U.S.	

=== Unofficial record ===
135 fights	101 wins	31 losses
By knockout	57	1
By decision	43	27
By disqualification	1	3
Draws	3	

Record with the inclusion of newspaper decisions to the win/loss/draw column.

No.	Result	Record	Opponent	Type	Round(s)	Date	Location	Note
135	Loss	101–31–3	Henry Chmielewski	MD	10	Jan 12, 1940	Mechanics Hall, Worcester, Connecticut, U.S.	
134	Loss	101–30–3	Lloyd Marshall	UD	10	Dec 6, 1939	Auditorium, Oakland, California, U.S.	
133	Loss	101–29–3	Frankie Britt	SD	12	Nov 9, 1939	Casino, Fall River, Massachusetts, U.S.	
132	Loss	101–28–3	Howell King	PTS	10	Sep 29, 1939	Mechanics Hall, Worcester, Connecticut, U.S.	
131	Win	101–27–3	Al Sinibaldi	NWS	10	Aug 17, 1939	Portland, Maine, U.S.	
130	Draw	100–27–3	Jackie Elverrillo	NWS	10	Jul 13, 1939	Exposition Building, Portland, Maine, U.S.	
129	Loss	100–27–2	Georgie Abrams	PTS	10	Jun 20, 1939	Griffith Stadium, Washington, D.C., U.S.	
128	Win	100–26–2	Henry Chmielewski	UD	10	Jun 2, 1939	Mechanics Hall, Worcester, Connecticut, U.S.	
127	Loss	99–26–2	Anton Christoforidis	PTS	10	Apr 5, 1939	Palais des Sports, Paris, Paris, France	
126	Draw	99–25–2	Edouard Tenet	PTS	10	Mar 17, 1939	Palais des Sports, Paris, Paris, France	
125	Win	99–25–1	Johnny Rossi	TKO	10 (12)	Dec 30, 1938	Mechanics Hall, Worcester, Connecticut, U.S.	
124	Loss	98–25–1	Ray Miller	PTS	10	Nov 7, 1938	Laurel Garden, Newark, New Jersey, U.S.	
123	Win	98–24–1	Joe Glasgow	KO	6 (10)	Sep 23, 1938	Boston Garden, Boston, Massachusetts, U.S.	
122	Loss	97–24–1	Gus Lesnevich	PTS	10	Mar 23, 1938	Hippodrome, New York City, New York, U.S.	
121	Loss	97–23–1	Tiger Jack Fox	TKO	7 (10)	Feb 18, 1938	Boston Garden, Boston, Massachusetts, U.S.	
120	Win	97–22–1	Dick Maloney	PTS	12	Dec 10, 1937	Boston Garden, Boston, Massachusetts, U.S.	
119	Win	96–22–1	Roy Kelley	UD	12	Oct 22, 1937	Boston Garden, Boston, Massachusetts, U.S.	
118	Win	95–22–1	Tiger Roy Williams	KO	2 (10)	Sep 9, 1937	Exposition Building, Portland, Maine, U.S.	
117	Loss	94–22–1	Teddy Yarosz	PTS	10	Feb 15, 1937	Mechanics Building, Boston, Massachusetts, U.S.	
116	Loss	94–21–1	Marcel Thil	DQ	6 (15)	Feb 15, 1937	Palais des Sports, Paris, Paris, France, Paris, France	For IBU middleweight title
115	Win	94–20–1	Carl Knowles	PTS	10	Dec 4, 1936	Arena, New Haven, Connecticut, U.S.	
114	Loss	93–20–1	Fred Apostoli	PTS	10	Oct 9, 1936	Dreamland Auditorium, San Francisco, California, U.S.	
113	Win	93–19–1	Jack Ennis	KO	8 (15)	Jun 26, 1936	Worcester, Connecticut, U.S.	
112	Loss	92–19–1	Marcel Thil	DQ	4 (15)	Jan 20, 1936	Palais des Sports, Paris, Paris, France, Paris, France	For IBU and The Ring middleweight titles
111	Win	92–18–1	Gustave Roth	SD	15	Dec 20, 1935	Palais des Sports, Paris, Paris, France, Paris, France	
110	Loss	91–18–1	Marcel Thil	UD	12	Nov 25, 1935	Palais des Sports, Paris, Paris, France, Paris, France	
109	Loss	91–17–1	Al McCoy	UD	10	Sep 20, 1935	Boston Garden, Boston, Massachusetts, U.S.	
108	Win	91–16–1	Young Corbett III	PTS	10	Jul 4, 1935	Kezar Stadium, San Francisco, California, U.S.	
107	Win	90–16–1	Marty Simmons	UD	10	Apr 17, 1935	Motor Square Garden, Pittsburgh, Pennsylvania, U.S.	
106	Win	89–16–1	Swede Berglund	PTS	10	Mar 22, 1935	Legion Stadium, Hollywood, California, U.S.	
105	Win	88–16–1	Babe Marino	TKO	7 (10)	Mar 15, 1935	Dreamland Auditorium, San Francisco, California, U.S.	
104	Win	87–16–1	Indian Jimmy Rivers	TKO	4 (10)	Feb 5, 1935	Olympic Auditorium, Los Angeles, California, U.S.	
103	Win	86–16–1	Oscar Rankins	TKO	4 (10)	Jan 29, 1935	Olympic Auditorium, Los Angeles, California, U.S.	
102	Win	85–16–1	Sammy Slaughter	TKO	4 (10)	Dec 25, 1934	Duquesne Garden, Pittsburgh, Pennsylvania, U.S.	
101	Win	84–16–1	Al Gainer	MD	10	Nov 23, 1934	Madison Square Garden, New York City, New York, U.S.	
100	Loss	83–16–1	Tait Littman	PTS	10	Oct 8, 1934	Duquesne Garden, Pittsburgh, Pennsylvania, U.S.	
99	Win	83–15–1	Solly Dukelsky	TKO	7 (10)	Sep 7, 1934	Mills Stadium, Chicago, Illinois, U.S.	
98	Win	82–15–1	Anson Green	TKO	8 (10)	Aug 20, 1934	Hickey Park, Pittsburgh, Pennsylvania, U.S.	
97	Loss	81–15–1	Al Gainer	PTS	10	Jul 12, 1934	Donovan Field, West Haven, Connecticut, U.S.	
96	Win	81–14–1	Henry Firpo	KO	6 (10)	Jun 11, 1934	Providence, Rhode Island, U.S.	
95	Win	80–14–1	Norman Conrad	PTS	10	May 11, 1934	Worcester, Connecticut, U.S.	
94	Win	79–14–1	Bob Olin	PTS	10	Apr 5, 1934	Arena, New Haven, Connecticut, U.S.	
93	Win	78–14–1	Al Gainer	PTS	10	Mar 5, 1934	Arena, New Haven, Connecticut, U.S.	
92	Win	77–14–1	Tommy Rios	KO	5 (10)	Feb 16, 1934	Mechanics Hall, Worcester, Connecticut, U.S.	
91	Win	76–14–1	Bob Olin	SD	10	Jan 19, 1934	Madison Square Garden, New York City, New York, U.S.	
90	Loss	75–14–1	Tony Shucco	MD	10	Nov 24, 1933	Boston Garden, Boston, Massachusetts, U.S.	
89	Loss	75–13–1	Vince Dundee	UD	15	Oct 30, 1933	Boston Garden, Boston, Massachusetts, U.S.	Lost NYSAC and NBA middleweight titles
88	Win	75–12–1	Adolf Hueser	TKO	8 (10)	Sep 22, 1933	Boston Garden, Boston, Massachusetts, U.S.	
87	Win	74–12–1	Ben Jeby	KO	7 (15)	Aug 9, 1933	Polo Grounds, New York City, New York, U.S.	Won NYSAC middleweight title
86	Win	73–12–1	Mickey Walker	PTS	10	Jul 6, 1933	Boston Garden, Boston, Massachusetts, U.S.	
85	Win	72–12–1	Sammy Slaughter	UD	10	May 16, 1933	Arena, Boston, Massachusetts, U.S.	
84	Loss	71–12–1	Johnny Indrisano	MD	10	Feb 24, 1933	Boston Garden, Boston, Massachusetts, U.S.	
83	Win	71–11–1	Horacio Velha	UD	10	Jan 9, 1933	Valley Arena, Holyoke, Massachusetts, U.S.	
82	Loss	70–11–1	Jimmy Smith	PTS	10	Dec 19, 1932	Arena, Philadelphia, Pennsylvania, U.S.	
81	Loss	70–10–1	Andy Callahan	UD	10	Oct 7, 1932	Boston Garden, Boston, Massachusetts, U.S.	
80	Win	70–9–1	Ad Zachow	PTS	10	Sep 9, 1932	Boston Garden, Boston, Massachusetts, U.S.	
79	Win	69–9–1	Jimmy McLarnin	SD	10	Aug 4, 1932	Yankee Stadium, New York City, New York, U.S.	
78	Win	68–9–1	Henry Wallace	KO	2 (10)	Jun 15, 1932	Woonsocket, Rhode Island, U.S.	
77	Loss	67–9–1	Johnny Indrisano	UD	10	Apr 29, 1932	Boston Garden, Boston, Massachusetts, U.S.	
76	Win	67–8–1	Johnny Indrisano	SD	10	Apr 8, 1932	Boston Garden, Boston, Massachusetts, U.S.	
75	Win	66–8–1	George Manolian	PTS	10	May 31, 1932	Foot Guard Hall, Hartford, Connecticut, U.S.	
74	Loss	65–8–1	Jackie Fields	UD	10	Jan 28, 1932	Chicago, Stadium, Chicago, Illinois, U.S.	Lost NYSAC, NBA, and The Ring welterweight titles
73	Draw	65–7–1	Baby Joe Gans	PTS	10	Dec 15, 1931	Forum, Montreal, Quebec, Canada	
72	Win	65–7	Paul Pirrone	DQ	7 (10)	Dec 10, 1931	Public Hall, Cleveland, Ohio, U.S.	
71	Win	64–7	Bucky Lawless	KO	3 (10)	Dec 2, 1931	Boston Garden, Boston, Massachusetts, U.S.	
70	Win	63–7	Young Jack Thompson	UD	15	Oct 23, 1931	Boston Garden, Boston, Massachusetts, U.S.	Won NYSAC, NBA, and The Ring welterweight titles
69	Win	62–7	Jackie Brady	PTS	10	Aug 25, 1931	Cycledrome, Providence, Rhode Island, U.S.	
68	Win	61–7	Young Jack Thompson	UD	10	Jul 23, 1931	Boston Garden, Boston, Massachusetts, U.S.	
67	Win	60–7	Paul Pirrone	KO	8 (10)	Jun 9, 1931	Boston Garden, Boston, Massachusetts, U.S.	
66	Win	59–7	Al Mello	TKO	8 (10)	May 15, 1931	Boston Garden, Boston, Massachusetts, U.S.	Won USA New England middleweight title; Won USA New England welterweight title
65	Win	58–7	Eddie Moore	KO	2 (10)	May 1, 1931	Worcester, Connecticut, U.S.	
64	Win	57–7	Frankie Belanger	KO	1 (10)	Apr 27, 1931	Arena, Quebec City, Quebec, Canada	
63	Win	56–7	Al Koziol	TKO	5 (8)	Apr 17, 1931	Armory, Willimantic, Connecticut, U.S.	
62	Win	55–7	Canada Lee	PTS	10	Mar 27, 1931	Worcester, Connecticut, U.S.	
61	Win	54–7	Baby Joe Gans	PTS	10	Mar 6, 1931	Worcester, Connecticut, U.S.	
60	Win	53–7	Canada Lee	KO	10 (10)	Feb 13, 1931	Worcester, Connecticut, U.S.	
59	Win	52–7	Alf Ross	TKO	6 (8)	Feb 6, 1931	Boston Garden, Boston, Massachusetts, U.S.	
58	Win	51–7	Al Palladino	TKO	7 (10)	Jan 30, 1931	Worcester, Connecticut, U.S.	
57	Win	50–7	Gaby Bagdad	PTS	8	Jan 1, 1931	Arena, Boston, Massachusetts, U.S.	
56	Win	49–7	Larry Brignolia	TKO	3 (6)	Dec 15, 1930	Arena, Boston, Massachusetts, U.S.	
55	Win	48–7	Frank Baldi	TKO	4 (8)	Oct 17, 1930	Worcester, Connecticut, U.S.	
54	Win	47–7	Billy Eskowtiz	KO	2 (8)	Sep 26, 1930	Danielson, Connecticut, U.S.	
53	Loss	46–7	Jimmy McGonnigle	DQ	5 (10)	Sep 25, 1930	Wilson Recreation Park, Keene, New Hampshire, U.S.	
52	Win	46–6	Nick Madonna	PTS	10	Aug 28, 1930	Wilson Recreation Park, Keene, New Hampshire, U.S.	
51	Win	45–6	Tony Travers	TKO	4 (10)	Aug 21, 1930	St. Michael's Arena, Pawcatuck, Connecticut, U.S.	
50	Win	44–6	Bobby Suber	PTS	10	Jul 3, 1930	Wilson Recreation Park, Keene, New Hampshire, U.S.	
49	Win	43–6	Rudy Marshall	PTS	8	Jul 2, 1930	St. Michael's Arena, Pawcatuck, Connecticut, U.S.	
48	Win	42–6	Joe Emmons	KO	4 (8)	Jun 11, 1930	Shymas Hall, Taftville, Connecticut, U.S.	
47	Win	41–6	Clyde Hull	PTS	10	May 9, 1930	Worcester, Connecticut, U.S.	
46	Win	40–6	Tony Magna	KO	3 (8)	Mar 23, 1930	Mechanics Hall, Worcester, Connecticut, U.S.	
45	Win	39–6	Owen Travers	TKO	6 (8)	Mar 4, 1930	Mechanics Hall, Worcester, Connecticut, U.S.	
44	Win	38–6	Mule Brown	PTS	8	Mar 28, 1930	Parish Hall, Taftville, Connecticut, U.S.	
43	Win	37–6	Joe Garvey	TKO	5 (8)	Mar 21, 1930	Mechanics Hall, Worcester, Connecticut, U.S.	
42	Win	36–6	Art Hurd	PTS	8	Mar 14, 1930	Lyceum Theatre, New London, Connecticut, U.S.	
41	Win	35–6	Eddie Reed	PTS	8	Feb 28, 1930	Lyceum Theatre, New London, Connecticut, U.S.	
40	Win	34–6	Billy Carney	TKO	6 (8)	Feb 21, 1930	Danielson, Connecticut, U.S.	
39	Win	33–6	Joe Rossi	KO	2 (8)	Feb 14, 1930	Parish Hall, Taftville, Connecticut, U.S.	
38	Win	32–6	Charlie Phippen	TKO	4 (8)	Feb 7, 1930	Worcester, Connecticut, U.S.	
37	Win	31–6	Stanley Reid	TKO	7 (8)	Jan 31, 1930	Town Hall, Danielson, Connecticut, U.S.	
36	Win	30–6	Artie Lee	PTS	8	Jan 24, 1930	Armory, New London, Connecticut, U.S.	
35	Win	29–6	Joe Russo	KO	3 (8)	Jan 17, 1930	Armory, New London, Connecticut, U.S.	
34	Win	28–6	Stanley Reid	TKO	6 (8)	Jan 1, 1930	Mechanics Hall, Worcester, Connecticut, U.S.	
33	Win	27–6	Joe Russo	KO	5 (8)	Dec 6, 1929	Parish Hall, Taftville, Connecticut, U.S.	
32	Win	26–6	Jimmy Hoag	TKO	6 (8)	Nov 22, 1929	Mechanics Hall, Worcester, Connecticut, U.S.	
31	Loss	25–6	Eddie Moore	PTS	8	Oct 17, 1929	Rakoczi Hall, Bridgeport, Connecticut, U.S.	
30	Win	25–5	Len Smith	TKO	5 (6)	Oct 9, 1929	Forum, Montreal, Quebec, Canada	
29	Loss	24–5	Jack Manley	PTS	10	Oct 3, 1929	State Armory, Keene, New Hampshire, U.S.	
28	Win	24–4	Bob Allison	KO	2 (6)	Sep 25, 1929	Forum, Montreal, Quebec, Canada	
27	Win	23–4	Rudy Marshall	TKO	5 (8)	Sep 19, 1929	Newfield Park, Bridgeport, Connecticut, U.S., Connecticut, U.S.	
26	Win	22–4	Bert Heathfield	KO	2 (6)	Sep 11, 1929	Forum, Montreal, Quebec, Canada	
25	Win	21–4	Jack Dugey	PTS	8	Sep 5, 1929	Ware's Grove Pavilion, Lake Spofford, New Hampshire, U.S.	
24	Win	20–4	Tom Quigley	TKO	5 (8)	Aug 23, 1929	Fairgrounds, Worcester, Connecticut, U.S.	
23	Win	19–4	Eddie Moore	PTS	8	Aug 15, 1929	Newfield Park, Bridgeport, Connecticut, U.S., Connecticut, U.S.	
22	Win	18–4	Harry Lagess	PTS	8	Jun 25, 1929	Ware's Grove Pavilion, Lake Spofford, New Hampshire, U.S.	
21	Win	17–4	Bill Lozeau	TKO	3 (6)	Jun 13, 1929	Summer Street Baseball Park, Fitchburg	
20	Win	16–4	Eddie Desautels	PTS	10	Jun 13, 1929	Lake Spofford, New Hampshire, U.S.	
19	Win	15–4	Al Bergeron	KO	7 (8)	Jun 7, 1929	Fairgrounds, Worcester, Connecticut, U.S.	
18	Win	14–4	Eddie Daley	TKO	4 (8)	May 31, 1929	Ware's Grove Pavilion, Lake Spofford, New Hampshire, U.S.	
17	Win	13–4	Dick Pangraze	TKO	3 (?)	May 24, 1929	Nashua Theatre, Nashua, New Hampshire, U.S.	
16	Win	12–4	Bill Lozeau	TKO	5 (10)	May 7, 1929	Nashua Theatre, Nashua, New Hampshire, U.S.	
15	Win	11–4	Young Johnny Buff	KO	2 (8)	Apr 23, 1929	Nashua Theatre, Nashua, New Hampshire, U.S.	
14	Loss	10–4	Scoops White	PTS	8	Apr 19, 1929	Worcester, Connecticut, U.S.	
13	Loss	10–3	Sam Lucci	PTS	8	Mar 15, 1929	Worcester, Connecticut, U.S.	
12	Win	10–2	Vic Morley	PTS	6	Mar 7, 1929	Foot Guard Hall, Hartford, Connecticut, U.S.	
11	Win	9–2	Al Sacco	KO	2 (6)	Feb 28, 1929	Mechanics Hall, Worcester, Connecticut, U.S.	
10	Loss	8–2	Young Angelo	PTS	6	Feb 21, 1929	Buckingham Hall, Waterbury, Connecticut, U.S.	
9	Win	8–1	Young Gaboury	KO	2 (6)	Feb 15, 1929	Mechanics Hall, Worcester, Connecticut, U.S.	
8	Win	7–1	Billy Rhodes	KO	3 (6)	Jan 18, 1929	Mechanics Hall, Worcester, Connecticut, U.S.	
7	Loss	6–1	George Lawson	PTS	6	Oct 4, 1928	Brassco Park, Waterbury, Connecticut, U.S.	
6	Win	6–0	Sammy Kraft	PTS	4	Sep 21, 1928	Brassco Park, Waterbury, Connecticut, U.S.	
5	Win	5–0	Benny Edwards	KO	4 (6)	Aug 30, 1928	Brassco Park, Waterbury, Connecticut, U.S.	
4	Win	4–0	Zeke Mazer	PTS	4	Aug 27, 1928	Velodrome, Hartford, Connecticut, U.S.	
3	Win	3–0	Mickey Mullins	TKO	5 (6)	Aug 16, 1928	Brassco Park, Waterbury, Connecticut, U.S.	
2	Win	2–0	Mickey Mullins	KO	3 (4)	Jul 12, 1928	Elks Park, Willimantic, Connecticut, U.S.	
1	Win	1–0	Billy Krake	KO	1 (4)	Jun 28, 1928	Elks Park, Willimantic, Connecticut, U.S.	

== Titles in boxing ==
=== Major world titles ===
- NYSAC welterweight champion (147 lbs)
- NBA (WBA) welterweight champion (147 lbs)
- NYSAC middleweight champion (160 lbs)
- NBA (WBA) middleweight champion (160 lbs)

=== The Ring magazine titles ===
- The Ring welterweight champion (147 lbs)

=== Regional/International titles ===
- New England welterweight champion (147 lbs)
- New England middleweight champion (160 lbs)

=== Undisputed titles ===
- Undisputed welterweight champion
- Undisputed middleweight champion

== See also ==
- List of welterweight boxing champions
- List of middleweight boxing champions

Awards and achievements
Preceded by Jack Thompson	World Welterweight Champion; October 23, 1931 – January 28, 1932	Succeeded by Jackie Fields
Preceded by Ben Jeby	NYSAC World Middleweight Champion; August 9, 1933 – October 30, 1933	Succeeded by Vince Dundee
