= Abie Bain =

American boxer (1906–1993)

Personal information
- Nationality: American
- Born: August 10, 1906 St. Petersburg, Russia
- Died: April 9, 1993 (aged 86) Ormond Beach, Florida, U.S.
- Weight: Middleweight; Light Heavyweight

Boxing career
- Stance: Orthodox

Boxing record
- Total fights: 108
- Wins: 66
- Win by KO: 24
- Losses: 36
- Draws: 6

Abie Bain (August 10, 1906 – April 9, 1993) was a rated Jewish Middleweight boxer from Newark, New Jersey. In 1930, he moved up a weight class and challenged Maxie Rosenbloom for the Light Heavyweight Championship of the World in Madison Square Garden, though he lost the bout.

During his career as a Middleweight in the 1920s, he was more in his element and competed well against competitive middleweight contenders. In May 1930, Bain was still ranked seventh in the world among Middleweights by Ring Magazine and stayed in the top ten from May to October of that year. After his retirement from boxing, he had a career in Hollywood. Actor Anthony Quinn patterned the raspy voice and mannerisms of his character Mountain Rivera in Columbia Pictures' 1962 movie Requiem for a Heavyweight on Bain who worked on the production as an adviser. The film was considered one of America's greatest boxing movies of that era.

== Early life and boxing career ==
Brought to America as a child, Bain was born in St. Petersburg, Russia on August 10, 1906. Perhaps wary of the political climate of the period, he gave Cambridge, Massachusetts, where he lived as a child, as his birthplace during his boxing career in the 1930s. Bain reputedly started boxing at age 12 as a flyweight and worked his way up. With such an early start to his career, he competed in nearly every weight class at one time. He fought extensively in Newark from 1923 to 1925, garnering an impressive fight record, but gaining little national exposure while fighting few ranked opponents.

== Later boxing career ==
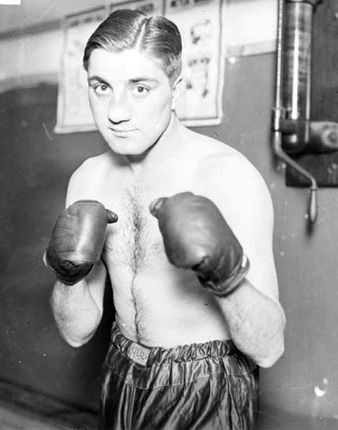
Vince Dundee, 1933-4 Middleweight Champion

Bain fought 1934 World Middleweight Champion Vince Dundee twice, 1927–29 World Welterweight Champion Joe Dundee, and on November 4, 1929, Middleweight contender Phil Krug. He fought highly ranked middleweight contender "KO" Phil Kaplan, losing to him in a fifth-round knockout on February 27, 1928, in Philadelphia.

He met rated black Middleweight Jack McVey on several occasions. Bain beat McVey, the "Pride of Harlem" due to a disqualification by McVey in the fifth round in Laurel Garden, in Newark, New Jersey, on July 12, 1926, though Bain was losing the bout prior to the call. On March 24, 1930, Bain drew with Middleweight McVey, in ten rounds at Laurel Garden in Newark. He had previously defeated McVey on December 17, 1928, in Newark in ten rounds. On March 28, 1930, Bain defeated Brooklyn based Middleweight boxer Pal Silvers in ten rounds in one of his first fights in Madison Square Garden.

=== Bout with Maxie Rosenbloom, October, 1930 ===
In one of his most significant fights, on October 22, 1930, Bain faced Light Heavyweight Champion Maxie Rosenbloom in Madison Square Garden as a legitimate contender for the World Light Heavyweight Championship. The referee was Lou Magnolia. According to the Pittsburgh Post-Gazette, the Light Heavyweight Class did not have a large supply of competitors skillful enough to face Rosenbloom at the time and Bain had little experience moving up from Middleweight. It was one of Bain's few bouts in the Garden before a large audience. After Rosenbloom battered out a technical knockout of Bain in the eleventh round before a crowd of around four thousand, a source noted that Rosenbloom "outclassed the New Jersey youngster from the first round."

He was again an unsuccessful contender for the Light Heavyweight Championship of the World against Dave Maier on January 15, 1932, in Chicago Stadium, when he was TKO'd in the first round. Bain had, however, won his first fight in the elimination tournament against Harry Fuller on December 18, 1931.

== Final boxing years, and move to heavyweight class ==
Bain even fought a few competitive heavyweights in his career, though perhaps it was ill-advised. He fought future World Heavyweight contender Tony Galento, in Dreamland Park on September 30, 1931, losing in a fourth-round TKO. Bain's New Jersey Hall of Fame bio noted that Bain was outweighed by as much as fifty pounds and the fight resulted in hospitalization and injuries that sped Bain's retirement from boxing. Galento would become a Heavyweight World contender fighting Joe Louis on June 28, 1939, in Philadelphia, actually knocking Louis to the mat in the bout, but losing in a fourth-round TKO. It is possible Bain's loss to Galento, which cost him seven weeks of hospitalization, made him a more likely model for Anthony Quinn's character "Mountain" Rivera in Quinn's classic boxing movie Requiem for a Heavyweight. The movie's plot centered on a Heavyweight's tragic loss to a stronger opponent on the poor advice of an ambitious manager.

He fought ex-Middleweight champion Al McCoy for the Montreal Athletic Commission World Light Heavyweight title in Montreal on October 24, 1935. McCoy knocked out Bain in the second round, in what marked Bain's final descent as a top contender.

== Retirement from boxing and partial filmography ==
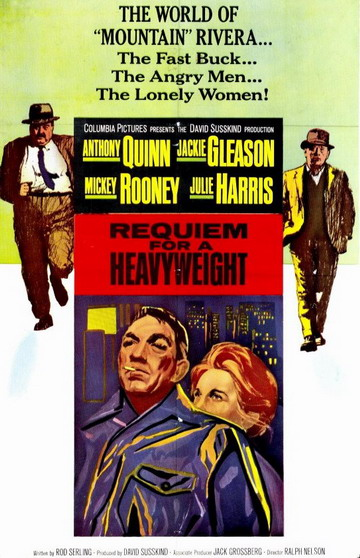

Fully retiring from boxing around 1939, Bain pursued his career in Hollywood full-time.

He found work in Warner Brother's 1937 boxing film Kid Galahad as an adviser, along with dozens of other boxing greats including Joe Glick, Willie and Phil Bloom, Jack Perry, and Bain's old nemesis Maxie Rosenbloom.

Bain was next cast in MGM's successful 1938 boxing movie, The Crowd Roars. The move featured actor Robert Taylor as "Kid McCoy", a boxer who kills an opponent in the ring. Over fifty boxers were called to work in a background gymnasium scene with Taylor in the foreground. The boxers included Larry Williams, fellow Jewish boxers Maxie Rosenbloom, Abe Hollandersky, Phil Bloom and Joe Glick, as well as Jimmy McLarnin, Jack Roper, and Tommy Herman.

Bain appeared in Paramount Studio's 1940 Golden Gloves along with boxers Baby Joe Gans and Joe Glick. He also appeared as an extra in Warner Brother's 1940 Leather Pushers and probably contributed to the authenticity of the boxing scenes in the movie.

In 1941, he was cast in Warner Brothers' Knockout as a boxer with fellow boxers Jack Herrick, Billy Coe, and Joe Gray. Actor Arthur Kennedy played a boxer attempting an ill-advised comeback on the advice of actor Anthony Quinn as an unscrupulous manager. The plot had similarities to Bain's future collaboration with Quinn in Requiem for a Heavyweight.

In Columbia Pictures' 1962 Requiem for a Heavyweight, Anthony Quinn told the press that he modeled his character Mountain Rivera on Bain using the same rough voice and mannerisms. Considered one of the better boxing pictures ever made, Bain worked as a technical adviser and had a small role in the movie as well. The film was based on the Emmy award-winning teleplay written by Rod Serling which debuted on television in October 1956. Serling also did the writing for the 1962 movie.

In later years, he was associated with actor Robert Wagner. He retired to Florida in 1984 and died in Ormond Beach on April 9, 1993. He was 86. His daughter Babette Bain(Born 7 December 1946) was an actress and singer best known for the role of young Miriam in Cecil B. DeMille's 1956, The Ten Commandments when she was 9.5 years old.

== Honors ==
Bain was inducted into the New Jersey Boxing Hall of Fame on October 17, 1976.
