= Johnny Indrisano =

American boxer

- Johnny Indrisano in Alfred Hitchcock Presents 1961
- Born: November 1, 1905
- Died: July 6, 1968 (aged 62)

Johnny Indrisano (November 1, 1905 — July 6, 1968) was an American welterweight boxer whose career spanned the period from 1923 to 1934. He later became a film stunt performer and a film and TV actor.

== Career ==
Indrisano was born in Boston. He defeated two world welterweight champions; Lou Brouillard (in two out of three bouts) and Jackie Fields. However, Indrisano never received a match for the world welterweight title.

Indrisano retired with a record of thirty seven wins (two wins by knockout) and nine defeats.

After his retirement from boxing, Indrisano had a career as a referee, stunt man, and actor in films such as Some Like It Hot and Guys and Dolls. He appeared in The Bowery Boys films (Live Wires, Mr. Hex, and Trouble Makers), a number of Joe Palooka movies, and three Elvis Presley films (Jailhouse Rock, King Creole, and It Happened at the World's Fair). He also worked from as early as 1937 through 1942 as a bodyguard for Mae West. On television, he appeared in a 1964 episode of the situation comedy The New Phil Silvers Show.

He died in Los Angeles, aged 62.

== Personal life and death ==
Indirisano married Mary Vardaro in the early 1930s, with whom he had a daughter, Kathleen. They were divorced in the 1940s. He committed suicide by hanging in his home in the Mount Olympus section of Los Angeles on July 6, 1968, his daughter's birthday, after a long bout of depression.

== Partial filmography ==
- Go West, Young Man (1936) as Chauffeur
- What a Woman! (1943) as Gymnast (uncredited)
- Live Wires (1946) as Second Bouncer
- Mr. Hex (1946) as Referee Joe McGowan
- It's a Wonderful Life (1946) - Man in Fantasy (uncredited)
- Trouble Makers (1948) as Lefty
- The Lady Gambles (1949) as Bert
- The Set-Up (1949) as Corner Man (uncredited) (fight sequence choreography)
- The Yellow Cab Man (1950) as Danny
- Callaway Went Thataway (1951) as Johnny Terrento
- Guys and Dolls (1955) as Liverlips Louie (uncredited)
- Jailhouse Rock (1957) as Convict (uncredited)
- King Creole (1958) as Collector (uncredited)
- Some Like It Hot (1959) as Waiter (uncredited)
- Pillow Talk (1959) as Truck Driver
- Ocean's Eleven (1960) as Texan (uncredited)
- Alfred Hitchcock Presents (1961) (Season 6 Episode 20: "The Throwback") as Joseph the Manservant
- Birdman of Alcatraz (1962) as Inmate (uncredited)
- The Manchurian Candidate (1962) as Reporter (uncredited)
- Who's Got the Action? (1962) as Hood
- It Happened at the World's Fair (1963) as Poker Player (uncredited)
- Hud (1963) as Waiter (uncredited)
- The New Phil Silvers Show (1964) (TV series) (Season 1 Episode 14: "Stop the Factory, I Wanna Get Off") as Ralph
- The Alfred Hitchcock Hour (1965) (Season 3 Episode 19: "Wally the Beard") as Bartender
