= Lee Savold =

American boxer

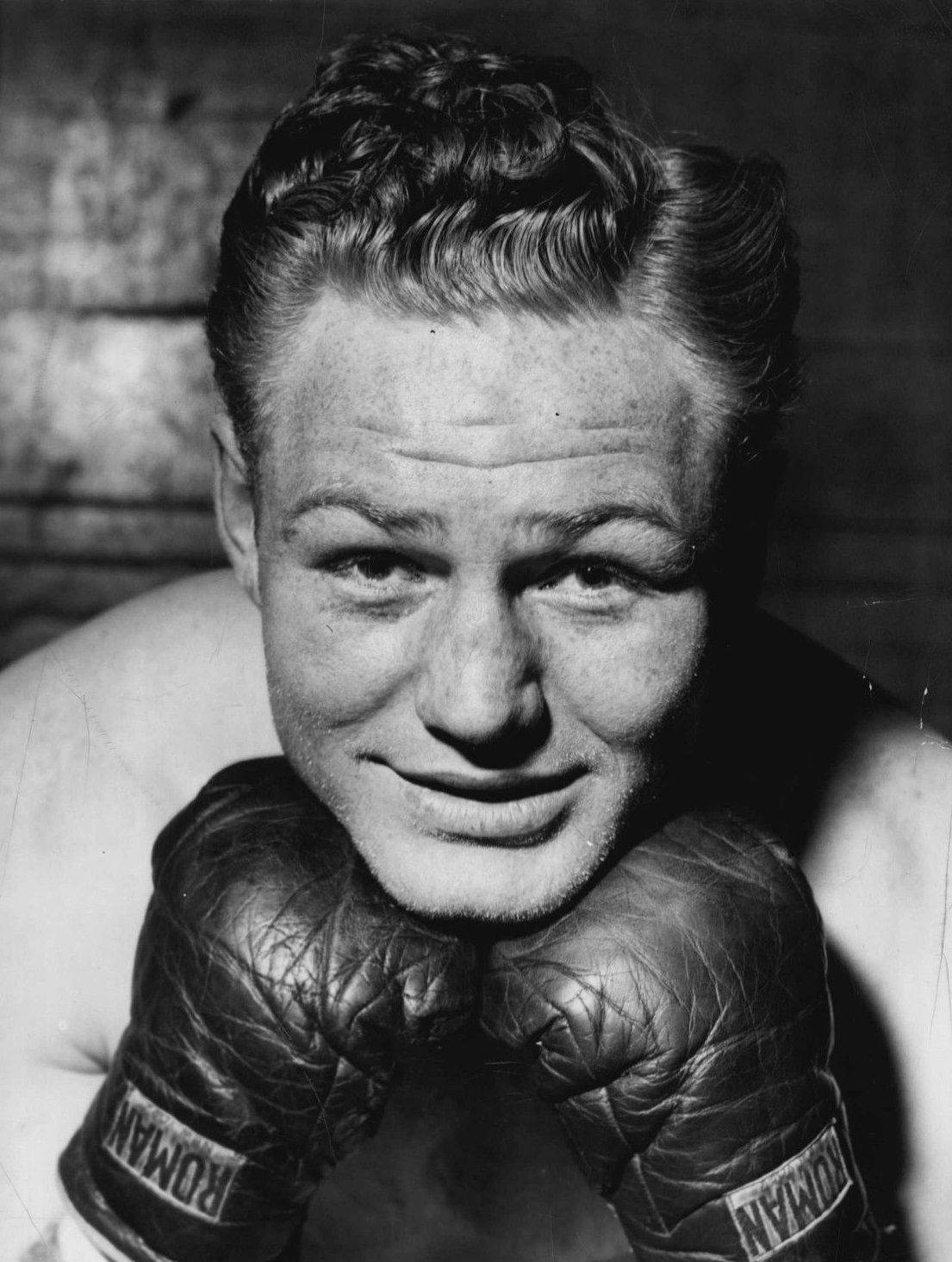
- close-up of Savold (1940)

Personal information
- Nicknames: Kid Savold; Lee Savoldi; The Blond Tiger; The Blond Bomber; Lethal Lee; Savage Savold; Violent Viking
- Born: Lee Hulver Savold; March 22, 1915 Canby, Minnesota, U.S.
- Died: May 14, 1972 (aged 57) Neptune Township, New Jersey, U.S.
- Height: 6 ft 1.5 in (1.87 m)
- Weight: Heavyweight

Boxing career
- Reach: 74.5 in (189 cm)
- Stance: Orthodox

Boxing record
- Total fights: 155; with the inclusion of newspaper decisions
- Wins: 98
- Win by KO: 72
- Losses: 40
- Draws: 3
- No contests: 1

Lee Hulver Savold (March 22, 1915 – May 14, 1972) was an American professional boxer who held the British and European (BBBofC/EBU) versions of the World Heavyweight Championship between 1950 and 1951, and was a leading contender in the 1940s and early 1950s. During his career he fought storied Heavyweight Champions Joe Louis and Rocky Marciano. Savold was inducted into the Minnesota Boxing Hall of Fame in 2012.

Lee Savold's best selling trading card is the 1951 Topps Ringside (No. 52).

According to Professional Sports Authenticator (PSA) records, the highest grade of this card is MINT (PSA 9) and "the second series of cards (No. 49 - No. 96) are somewhat more difficult to obtain than the first series."

== Personal life ==
Lee Hulver Savold was born in Canby, Minnesota (his birth was recorded in the nearby town of Marshall). His parents were farmers and ranchers of Norwegian ancestry. In his youth, he broke horses and herded cattle on his family ranch.

At one time or another, he was a bouncer, bartender, road laborer, and stockyard worker. In 1944, he joined the merchant marine and took part in several convoys to Murmansk, Russia. After retiring from boxing, he worked for Local 825 of the Operating Engineers Union.

- The word "hulver" is believed to be derived from the Old Norse word "hulfr," which also referred to holly, according to etymological sources. Its association with Thor in Norse mythology also connects it with strength and resilience, as holly resists lightning.

== Boxing career ==
According to a Minneapolis newspaper article in 1934, Lee Savoldi, 18 years old, was "managed by battle-scarred veteran Jock Malone, who fought the best of them in his day, and who says in Savoldi he has a proper successor to Mike Gibbons, Billy Miske and Mike O'Dowd."

In 1935, Lee Savold won the Minnesota Class A - Pro heavyweight tournament for a chance to fight future heavyweight champion, Joe Louis.

In January 1937, the California State Athletic Commission (CSAC) ranked Lee Savoldi as the No. 9 heavyweight for the year 1936.

On March 1, 1940, sportswriter Dan Morgan explained to Whitney Martin why Lee Savold is "another Gibbons" and "the best prospect around."

"Look at him. Tommy Gibbons all over again. He feints, he shifts, he holds his hands ready to hit from anywhere. He's liable to knockout Pastor. Maybe he does tire, but Pastor will tire too. All heavyweights tire. You know the first two things a heavyweight does? Eats and sits down. Savold's that rare combination in a heavyweight, a hitter and a boxer. There aren't many of them around now. In fact, just Savold and Louis. Take Pastor, only a boxer. And Nova, and Buddy Baer, and Paychek and Roscoe Toles, all just boxers. Then there's Galento, just a hitter, and Godoy and Campolo, and Abe Simon, all freaks, meaning they're neither boxers nor hitters. I tell you, Savold is the best prospect around."

On April 1, 1940, Lee Savold was featured on the cover of The Ring magazine. He was nicknamed "The Blond Bomber" by sports editor Garner "Sec" Taylor because of his blond hair and comparisons to Joe Louis, "The Brown Bomber." Louis was on the previous cover for March.

On September 16, 1940, Lee Savold knocked out Andy Miller in the first round. Jack Dempsey, former heavyweight champion, who was at ringside, presented the Iowa State Heavyweight Championship trophy to Savold after the bout.

Lee Savold started off the year 1942 by registering three knockout victories in a row, finishing off Neville Beech in four rounds at Washington, D.C., Teddy Wint in nine rounds at the Coliseum in the Bronx, and Wallace Cross in nine rounds at Newark.

On May 25, 1942, Lee Savold stopped Lou Nova in the eighth round of the United States Navy Relief heavyweight bout at Griffith Stadium, Washington, D.C., which was named The Ring magazine Upset of the Year. Savold was unmarked and scored the only knockdown, catching Nova off balance with a left in the second round. There was no count. Nova was forced to surrender because of face cuts.

After fighting professionally for nine of his 25 years and now the third ranked NBA leading heavyweight, Savold wanted a shot at Joe Louis' heavyweight crown. He thought he could give Private Joe Louis a good battle. "I'm in the best condition of my life and hitting better than ever before," Savold said. "This is the chance I've been waiting for, and I'm ready to fight Louis any time, any place." When questioned as to who his next challenger was for Joe Louis, promoter Mike Jacobs said, "It's all up to Uncle Sam. Joe Louis belongs in the army now and it's up to them to say when Joe can fight and whether he can fight."

On July 21, 1942, Lee Savold, one of the country's leading contenders for the heavyweight championship, moved closer to a title bout by virtue of a ninth-round knockout over Bill Poland before more than 15,000 fans, whose dollars went into a "Bomber-for-MacArthur" fund. In the first minute of the knockout round, Savold let go with a left jab to Poland's throat and followed it up with a hard right to the jaw that sent the New Yorker to the canvas, where Referee Jim Braddock counted him out. The bout was sponsored by the American Federation of Labor.

On August 7, 1944, Joe Baksi won a 10-round scrap against Lee Savold in front of 16,135 fans at Wrigley Field, Chicago. The Illinois Athletic Commission sanctioned the bout as for the "World's Duration Heavyweight Championship." Savold made no excuses.

"I was in shape," he said in his dressing room, "but the maritime service took some zip out of me. I can't concentrate too much on my ring wars, especially when I'm training for a bigger battle."

On February 4, 1945, Pfc. Clarence Lasky reported in the Sport Chips section of T-Patch 36th Division News: "The exhibition bout between Jack Johnson and either King Levinsky or Lee Savold was prohibited by the Illinois Athletic Commission. Johnson, who lost the heavyweight championship to Jess Willard in 1915, now 68 years old, failed to pass the physical examination."

On March 19, 1948, Lee Savold set the record for the quickest knockout in a main event bout at Madison Square Garden by knocking out Italy's Gino Buonvino in 54 seconds. He was the underdog, and had been substituted for Joe Baksi, who had injured his ankle, on only 48 hours' notice. According to National Broadcasting Company (NBC) archives, this was the earliest kinescope recorded boxing match on Friday Night Fights (Gillette Cavalcade of Sports). Savold's record stood until Gerry Cooney tied the record by KO'ing Ken Norton in 1981. It was finally broken on March 10, 2007, when Sultan Ibragimov KO'd Javier Mora in 46 seconds. Mora substituted for Shannon Briggs on two weeks notice.

On June 6, 1950, Lee Savold stopped Bruce Woodcock in the fourth round at White City Stadium, London, to win the British and European versions of the World Heavyweight Championship. Nat Fleischer, whose record book is the recognized authority in the United States, said he will list the bout as a fourth-round knockout.

Lee Savold was now recognized by two world sanctioning bodies, the BBBofC and EBU (formerly IBU), as the World Heavyweight Champion. The only official rival at this time was the NBA, who recognized Ezzard Charles as the World Heavyweight Champion.

BoxRec states:

"Once upon a time there were only eight weight divisions, with only one champion per division, for a total of eight boxing world champions at any one time (sometimes fewer, if one boxer was the champion of two or more divisions at a time). A contender became the world champion only by beating the then-World Champion, or by beating other contenders in an elimination tournament for a vacant world title. In those days there were only a handful of world sanctioning bodies-including the National Boxing Association, New York State Athletic Commission, International Boxing Union, British Boxing Board of Control, and a few others."

On September 1, 1950, Lee Savold was featured on the cover of The Ring magazine. Stanley Weston remarked, "As for Savold, his decisive knockout victory over Bruce Woodcock won for him the British version of the world heavyweight championship."

Four days later, Lee Savold participated in an exhibition bout with future middleweight champion, Randolph Turpin, at Vicarage Road (Watford Football Club). The event was promoted by Jack Solomons as the "Grand Boxing Tournament" and featured six pro bouts.

On June 12, 1951, J. Onslow Fane, chairman of the British Boxing Board of Control and president of the European Boxing Union, withheld comment on whether the board would recognize the winner of the Joe Louis-Lee Savold bout as world heavyweight champion. "Despite reports to the contrary, we are not committing ourselves in any shape or form," Fane said. "Our official reaction to all such queries has been 'no comment.'"

On June 15, 1951, the first large scale intercity theater television went online. The Joe Louis-Lee Savold boxing match was carried to intercity theaters from Madison Square Garden, New York, on American Telephone and Telegraph Company (AT&T Corporation) television networks. It was the first professional prizefight to be shown on closed-circuit television. The estimated 81,022 buys record was broken just a few months later in the Ray Robinson-Randolph Turpin rematch (100,000 buys).

"The Louis-Savold fight carried incredible implications for baseball," said Paul Jonas, the chief of sports telecasting for the Mutual Broadcasting System. Mutual already held the TV contract for the World Series, but Jonas envisioned vast additional revenue from theaters. "The major leagues," he said, "are face to face with a pot of gold."

On September 9, 1951, German Boxing Officials announced that "heavyweight Lee Savold has been signed for a 10-round bout with Germany's Heinz Neuhaus. It was disclosed that German promoters Walter Englert and Joachim Goettert arranged the fight with the help of American traveling promoter Fred Kirsch."

On February 14, 1952, The Associated Press (Boxing) reported: "Philadelphia, Rocky Marciano stopped Lee Savold in the seventh round of their scheduled 10-round heavyweight fight."

On January 18, 1954, Kitione Lave, the "Tongan Torpedo," who defeated the former New Zealand heavyweight boxing champion, Don Mullet, was offered a bout with the American, Lee Savold, in Sydney, Australia. J. Phillips, representative of the Australian Boxing Club, said that the winner of this fight would be matched against the winner of the Australian title bout between Ken Brady and Norm Harvey.

== Death ==
Savold died on May 14, 1972, aged 57, at Jersey Shore University Medical Center in Neptune Township, New Jersey. He had been admitted a month earlier after suffering a stroke in his apartment in Spring Lake, New Jersey.

== Professional boxing record ==
All information in this section is derived from BoxRec, unless otherwise stated.

=== Official record ===
155 fights	98 wins	41 losses
By knockout	72	12
By decision	26	28
By disqualification	0	1
Draws	3	
No contests	1	
Newspaper decisions/draws	12	

All newspaper decisions are officially regarded as "no decision" bouts and are not counted in the win/loss/draw column.

No.	Result	Record	Opponent	Type	Round, time	Date	Location	Notes
155	Loss	98–41–3 (13)	Rocky Marciano	RTD	6 (10)	Feb 13, 1952	Convention Hall, Philadelphia, Pennsylvania, US	
154	Loss	98–40–3 (13)	Joe Louis	KO	6 (15), 2:29	Jun 15, 1951	Madison Square Garden, New York City, New York, US	Lost BBBofC world heavyweight title
153	Win	98–39–3 (13)	Bruce Woodcock	RTD	4 (15), 3:00	Jun 6, 1950	White City Stadium, London, England, UK	Won vacant BBBofC world heavyweight title
152	Loss	97–39–3 (13)	Bruce Woodcock	DQ	4 (10), 1:40	Dec 6, 1948	Harringay Arena, London, England, UK	Low blow
151	Win	97–38–3 (13)	Pete Louthis	KO	5 (10)	May 19, 1948	Armory, Akron, Ohio, US	
150	Win	96–38–3 (13)	Buddy Walker	KO	1 (10), 0:44	May 4, 1948	Memorial Auditorium, Buffalo, New York, US	
149	Win	95–38–3 (13)	Gino Buonvino	KO	1 (10), 0:54	Mar 19, 1948	Madison Square Garden, New York City, New York, US	
148	Win	94–38–3 (13)	Alberto Marchione	TKO	8 (8), 1:37	Aug 11, 1947	Croke Park, New York City, New York, US	
147	Draw	93–38–3 (13)	Ted Lowry	PTS	10	Aug 7, 1947	Fall River Stadium, Fall River, Massachusetts, US	
146	Loss	93–38–2 (13)	Phil Muscato	UD	10	Apr 16, 1947	Memorial Auditorium, Buffalo, New York, US	
145	Win	93–37–2 (13)	Duilio Spagnolo	TKO	8 (10)	Mar 28, 1947	Boston Garden, Boston, Massachusetts, US	
144	Loss	92–37–2 (13)	Phil Muscato	SD	10	Mar 11, 1947	Memorial Auditorium, Buffalo, New York, US	
143	Loss	92–36–2 (13)	Fitzie Fitzpatrick	UD	10	Jan 28, 1947	Olympic Auditorium, Los Angeles, California, US	
142	Draw	92–35–2 (13)	Jimmy Richie	SD	10	Jan 20, 1947	Kiel Auditorium, Saint Louis, Missouri, US	
141	Win	92–35–1 (13)	Steve Ketchell	KO	3 (10)	Sep 26, 1946	Casino, Fall River, Massachusetts, US	
140	Win	91–35–1 (13)	Pete Louthis	TKO	5 (10), 2:33	Sep 18, 1946	Arcadia Ballroom, Providence, Rhode Island, US	
139	Loss	90–35–1 (13)	Elmer Ray	KO	2 (10), 1:39	Aug 28, 1946	Ebbets Field, New York City, New York, US	
138	Win	90–34–1 (13)	Johnny White	UD	10	Jul 29, 1946	Coney Island Velodrome, New York City, New York, US	
137	Win	89–34–1 (13)	Jimmy O'Brien	UD	10	Jun 13, 1946	Rubber Bowl, Akron, Ohio, US	
136	Win	88–34–1 (13)	Bob Garner	KO	2 (10)	May 15, 1946	Armory, Akron, Ohio, US	
135	Win	87–34–1 (13)	Lindy Elliott	KO	2 (10), 1:35	May 1, 1946	Armory, Akron, Ohio, US	
134	NC	86–34–1 (13)	Arturo Godoy	NC	8 (10)	Mar 1, 1946	Chicago Stadium, Chicago, Illinois, US	Fight stopped for excessive clinching
133	Loss	86–34–1 (12)	Al Hoosman	UD	10	Jan 7, 1946	Madison Square Garden, New York City, New York, US	
132	Win	86–33–1 (12)	Dixie Oliver	KO	1 (10)	Dec 22, 1945	Ridgewood Grove, New York City, New York, US	
131	Win	85–33–1 (12)	Al Hoosman	UD	10	Dec 3, 1945	St. Nicholas Arena, New York City, New York, US	
130	Win	84–33–1 (12)	Kid Riviera	KO	3 (10)	Nov 7, 1945	Municipal Auditorium, Kansas City, Missouri, US	
129	Win	83–33–1 (12)	Gus Dorazio	UD	10	Dec 15, 1944	Auditorium, Saint Paul, Minnesota, US	
128	Loss	82–33–1 (12)	Joe Baksi	MD	10	Aug 7, 1944	Wrigley Field, Chicago, Illinois, US	
127	Loss	82–32–1 (12)	Joe Baksi	UD	12	May 26, 1944	Madison Square Garden, New York City, New York, US	
126	Win	82–31–1 (12)	Joe Baksi	SD	10	Mar 10, 1944	Madison Square Garden, New York City, New York, US	
125	Loss	81–31–1 (12)	Tami Mauriello	UD	10	Nov 5, 1943	Madison Square Garden, New York City, New York, US	
124	Win	81–30–1 (12)	Eddie Blunt	KO	1 (10), 1:02	Oct 22, 1943	Arena, Cleveland, Ohio, US	
123	Loss	80–30–1 (12)	Eddie Blunt	SD	10	Oct 5, 1943	Armory, Akron, Ohio, US	
122	Win	80–29–1 (12)	Lou Nova	KO	2 (10)	Aug 9, 1943	Wrigley Field, Chicago, Illinois, US	
121	Win	79–29–1 (12)	Lem Franklin	KO	8 (10), 2:55	Apr 16, 1943	Chicago Stadium, Chicago, Illinois, US	
120	Win	78–29–1 (12)	Jack Marshall	KO	2 (10)	Mar 15, 1943	Municipal Auditorium, Kansas City, Missouri, US	
119	Win	77–29–1 (12)	Lem Franklin	KO	10 (10)	Feb 15, 1943	Chicago Stadium, Chicago, Illinois, US	
118	Win	76–29–1 (12)	Nate Bolden	TKO	3 (10)	Jan 22, 1943	Chicago Stadium, Chicago, Illinois, US	
117	Loss	75–29–1 (12)	Jimmy Bivins	UD	10	Nov 27, 1942	Madison Square Garden, New York City, New York, US	
116	Win	75–28–1 (12)	Johnny Kapovich	TKO	2 (10)	Nov 16, 1942	Coliseum, Baltimore, Maryland, US	
115	Loss	74–28–1 (12)	Tami Mauriello	UD	10	Oct 30, 1942	Madison Square Garden, New York City, New York, US	
114	Win	74–27–1 (12)	Johnny Flynn	KO	4 (10), 2:25	Sep 22, 1942	Armory, Akron, Ohio, US	
113	Win	73–27–1 (12)	Tony Musto	UD	10	Sep 17, 1942	Olympia Stadium, Detroit, Michigan, US	
112	Loss	72–27–1 (12)	Tony Musto	SD	10	Aug 21, 1942	Griffith Stadium, Washington, DC, US	
111	Win	72–26–1 (12)	Bill Poland	KO	9 (10)	Jul 21, 1942	Scott Stadium, Toledo, Ohio, US	
110	Win	71–26–1 (12)	Lou Nova	TKO	8 (10)	May 25, 1942	Griffith Stadium, Washington, DC, US	
109	Win	70–26–1 (12)	Jack Marshall	PTS	10	Apr 24, 1942	Toledo, Ohio, US	
108	Win	69–26–1 (12)	Wallace Cross	KO	9 (10)	Mar 23, 1942	Laurel Garden, Newark, New Jersey, US	
107	Win	68–26–1 (12)	Ted Wint	TKO	9 (10)	Mar 18, 1942	New York Coliseum, New York City, New York, US	
106	Win	67–26–1 (12)	Neville Beech	TKO	4 (10)	Feb 2, 1942	Turner's Arena, Washington, DC, US	
105	Win	66–26–1 (12)	Buddy Knox	TKO	5 (10), 3:00	Dec 2, 1941	Armory, Paterson, New Jersey, US	
104	Win	65–26–1 (12)	Jack Marshall	MD	10	Nov 28, 1941	Olympia Stadium, Detroit, Michigan, US	
103	Win	64–26–1 (12)	Tony Degutis	KO	1 (6), 2:08	Oct 31, 1941	Olympia Stadium, Detroit, Michigan, US	
102	Win	63–26–1 (12)	Ralph Kosky	KO	1 (3)	Oct 17, 1941	Olympia Stadium, Detroit, Michigan, US	
101	Win	62–26–1 (12)	Lou Brooks	KO	6 (10)	Sep 17, 1941	Wilmington Park, Wilmington, Delaware, US	
100	Win	61–26–1 (12)	Claudio Villar	KO	4 (10), 2:55	Aug 27, 1941	Griffith Stadium, Washington, DC, US	
99	Loss	60–26–1 (12)	Harry Bobo	KO	2 (10)	Aug 12, 1941	Forbes Field, Pittsburgh, Pennsylvania, US	
98	Win	60–25–1 (12)	Solly Krieger	PTS	10	Jul 22, 1941	Ebbets Field, New York City, New York, US	
97	Win	59–25–1 (12)	Erv Sarlin	UD	10	Jul 14, 1941	Hickey Park, Millvale, Pennsylvania, US	
96	Win	58–25–1 (12)	King Kong	KO	6 (10)	Jun 26, 1941	Municipal Stadium, Baltimore, Maryland, US	
95	Loss	57–25–1 (12)	Harry Bobo	SD	10	May 26, 1941	Forbes Field, Pittsburgh, Pennsylvania, US	
94	Win	57–24–1 (12)	Mike Alfano	TKO	3 (10)	Apr 7, 1941	Atlanta, Georgia, US	
93	Win	56–24–1 (12)	Henry Wacker	KO	2 (10), 1:43	Mar 17, 1941	Auditorium, Saint Paul, Minnesota, US	
92	Win	55–24–1 (12)	Selman Martin	NWS	10	Feb 19, 1941	Coliseum, Des Moines, Iowa, US	
91	Loss	55–24–1 (11)	Billy Conn	UD	12	Nov 29, 1940	Madison Square Garden, New York City, New York, US	
90	Win	55–23–1 (11)	Arne Andersson	TKO	8 (10)	Oct 9, 1940	Auditorium, Saint Paul, Minnesota, US	
89	Win	54–23–1 (11)	Andy Miller	KO	1 (8), 1:43	Sep 16, 1940	Coliseum, Des Moines, Iowa, US	Won vacant USA Iowa heavyweight title
88	Win	53–23–1 (11)	Bob Nestell	KO	3 (10), 0:55	Aug 19, 1940	Riverview Park, Des Moines, Iowa, US	
87	Win	52–23–1 (11)	Domingo Valin	TKO	2 (10)	Aug 5, 1940	Lexington Park, Saint Paul, Minnesota, US	
86	Win	51–23–1 (11)	Billy Miske Jr.	KO	3 (10), 2:24	Jul 15, 1940	Lexington Park, Saint Paul, Minnesota, US	
85	Win	50–23–1 (11)	Johnny Whiters	NWS	8	Jun 24, 1940	Riverview Park, Des Moines, Iowa, US	
84	Win	50–23–1 (10)	Red Bruce	KO	4 (10)	Jun 13, 1940	Electric Park, Waterloo, Iowa, US	
83	Win	49–23–1 (10)	Eddie Boyle	KO	1 (10), 2:50	Apr 11, 1940	Coliseum, Des Moines, Iowa, US	
82	Loss	48–23–1 (10)	Johnny Whiters	MD	10	Mar 28, 1940	Municipal Auditorium, Saint Louis, Missouri, US	
81	Win	48–22–1 (10)	Jim Robinson	TKO	3 (8)	Jan 10, 1940	Madison Square Garden, New York City, New York, US	
80	Win	47–22–1 (10)	Arne Andersson	PTS	8	Dec 29, 1939	City Auditorium, Omaha, Nebraska, US	Not to be confused with Arne Andersson
79	Win	46–22–1 (10)	Eddie Simms	NWS	10	Dec 18, 1939	Coliseum, Des Moines, Iowa, US	
78	Win	46–22–1 (9)	Maurice Strickland	KO	3 (10)	Dec 4, 1939	Coliseum, Des Moines, Iowa, US	
77	Win	45–22–1 (9)	Pal Silvers	KO	3 (10)	Nov 24, 1939	Armory, Mason City, Iowa, US	
76	Loss	44–22–1 (9)	Buddy Baer	NWS	8	Oct 30, 1939	Coliseum, Des Moines, Iowa, US	
75	Win	44–22–1 (8)	Louis Gray	KO	2 (6)	Oct 9, 1939	Riverview Park, Des Moines, Iowa, US	
74	Win	43–22–1 (8)	Jack O'Sullivan	TKO	2 (4), 1:04	Sep 20, 1939	Briggs Stadium, Detroit, Michigan, US	
73	Win	42–22–1 (8)	Lester Miller	KO	1 (6)	Sep 5, 1939	Belmont Park, Garfield, New Jersey, US	
72	Win	41–22–1 (8)	Johnny Sionas	RTD	2 (6)	Sep 1, 1939	Atlantic Stadium, Long Branch, New Jersey, US	
71	Win	40–22–1 (8)	Danny LaMarre	TKO	2 (6)	Aug 8, 1939	Western League Baseball Park, Des Moines, Iowa, US	
70	Win	39–22–1 (8)	Henry Jones	RTD	7 (10)	Jul 28, 1939	Electric Park, Waterloo, Iowa, US	
69	Win	38–22–1 (8)	Johnny Brown	TKO	1 (6)	Jul 24, 1939	Hill Baseball Park, Cedar Rapids, Iowa, US	
68	Loss	37–22–1 (8)	Andy Miller	NWS	8	Jul 17, 1939	Riverview Park, Sioux City, Iowa, US	
67	Win	37–22–1 (7)	Johnny Brown	PTS	6	Mar 22, 1939	Lexington Park, Saint Paul, Minnesota, US	
66	Loss	36–22–1 (7)	Lem Franklin	KO	2 (10)	Mar 20, 1939	Marigold Gardens, Chicago, Illinois, US	
65	Win	36–21–1 (7)	Tom Kenneally	KO	9 (10)	Mar 1, 1939	Auditorium, Saint Paul, Minnesota, US	
64	Loss	35–21–1 (7)	Tom Kenneally	UD	8	Jan 27, 1939	White City Arena, Chicago, Illinois, US	
63	Win	35–20–1 (7)	Webster Epperson	KO	6 (6)	Jan 2, 1939	Palace Theatre, Minneapolis, Minnesota, US	
62	Win	34–20–1 (7)	Frankie Jones	KO	5 (8)	Jul 28, 1938	Riverview Park, Sioux City, Iowa, US	
61	Win	33–20–1 (7)	George Hill	KO	5 (8)	Jul 21, 1938	Riverview Park, Sioux City, Iowa, US	
60	Win	32–20–1 (7)	Tuffy Dial	NWS	6	Jul 7, 1938	Riverview Park, Sioux City, Iowa, US	
59	Loss	32–20–1 (6)	Domingo Valin	KO	6 (10)	May 5, 1937	Auditorium, Oakland, California, US	
58	Loss	32–19–1 (6)	Al Bray	PTS	8	Feb 17, 1937	Dreamland Auditorium, San Francisco, California, US	
57	Loss	32–18–1 (6)	Phil Brubaker	TKO	3 (10), 2:06	Nov 20, 1936	Dreamland Auditorium, San Francisco, California, US	
56	Win	32–17–1 (6)	Charley Coates	PTS	10	Oct 30, 1936	Dreamland Auditorium, San Francisco, California, US	
55	Win	31–17–1 (6)	Carl Walker	KO	6 (10)	Sep 30, 1936	Civic Auditorium, San Francisco, California, US	
54	Win	30–17–1 (6)	Ford Smith	KO	4 (10), 1:55	Sep 11, 1936	Dreamland Auditorium, San Francisco, California, US	
53	Loss	29–17–1 (6)	Sonny Boy Walker	PTS	10	Aug 12, 1936	Civic Auditorium, San Francisco, California, US	
52	Loss	29–16–1 (6)	Sonny Boy Walker	PTS	8	Jul 22, 1936	Civic Auditorium, San Francisco, California, US	
51	Win	29–15–1 (6)	Don Conn	PTS	10	Jul 17, 1936	Coliseum, San Diego, California, US	
50	Win	28–15–1 (6)	Danny Alberts	TKO	4 (10)	Jul 3, 1936	Coliseum, San Diego, California, US	
49	Loss	27–15–1 (6)	Hank Hankinson	PTS	10	Jun 12, 1936	Coliseum, San Diego, California, US	
48	Win	27–14–1 (6)	Blondy Ryan	TKO	6 (10), 1:27	May 22, 1936	Coliseum, San Diego, California, US	
47	Loss	26–14–1 (6)	Alfred Rogers	PTS	10	Apr 17, 1936	Coliseum, San Diego, California, US	
46	Win	26–13–1 (6)	Buster Alexander	KO	3 (6)	Apr 9, 1936	Coliseum, San Diego, California, US	
45	Win	25–13–1 (6)	Coleman Johns	TKO	8 (10)	Apr 3, 1936	Coliseum, San Diego, California, US	
44	Win	24–13–1 (6)	Jack Darcy	TKO	2 (4)	Feb 28, 1936	Legion Stadium, Hollywood, California, US	
43	Win	23–13–1 (6)	Rush Heise	PTS	5	Jan 10, 1936	Chicago Stadium, Chicago, Illinois, US	
42	Win	22–13–1 (6)	Russ Wasser	PTS	5	Dec 27, 1935	Auditorium, Minneapolis, Minnesota, US	
41	Win	21–13–1 (6)	Peter Doss	PTS	3	Dec 27, 1935	Auditorium, Minneapolis, Minnesota, US	
40	Win	20–13–1 (6)	Verne Trickle	PTS	8	Sep 19, 1935	Auditorium, Saint Paul, Minnesota, US	
39	Win	19–13–1 (6)	Eddie Slake	PTS	4	Aug 7, 1935	Comiskey Park, Chicago, Illinois, US	
38	Loss	18–13–1 (6)	Frank Androff	PTS	6	Jun 13, 1935	Auditorium, Minneapolis, Minnesota, US	
37	Loss	18–12–1 (6)	Andy Miller	NWS	6	May 27, 1935	Riverview Park, Sioux City, Iowa, US	
36	Win	18–12–1 (5)	Bill Kemp	KO	2 (4)	May 20, 1935	Armory, Minneapolis, Minnesota, US	
35	Win	17–12–1 (5)	Andy Miller	TKO	2 (6)	May 2, 1935	Auditorium, Saint Paul, Minnesota, US	
34	Draw	16–12–1 (5)	Verne Trickle	NWS	8	Apr 18, 1935	Opera House, Armstrong, Iowa, US	
33	Loss	16–12–1 (4)	Jack Gibbons	PTS	10	Apr 4, 1935	Auditorium, Minneapolis, Minnesota, US	
32	Win	16–11–1 (4)	Verne Trickle	PTS	6	Mar 25, 1935	Eagles' Club, Minneapolis, Minnesota, US	
31	Loss	15–11–1 (4)	Billy Treest	TKO	4 (6)	Mar 15, 1935	Chicago Stadium, Chicago, Illinois, US	
30	Loss	15–10–1 (4)	Frank Androff	PTS	6	Mar 4, 1935	Auditorium, Minneapolis, Minnesota, US	
29	Win	15–9–1 (4)	Jack Charvez	PTS	8	Jan 14, 1935	Auditorium, Minneapolis, Minnesota, US	
28	Win	14–9–1 (4)	Larry Udell	PTS	10	Jan 4, 1935	Auditorium, Minneapolis, Minnesota, US	
27	Win	13–9–1 (4)	Russ Wasser	PTS	6	Dec 28, 1934	Auditorium, Minneapolis, Minnesota, US	
26	Win	12–9–1 (4)	Verne Trickle	PTS	6	Dec 14, 1934	Auditorium, Minneapolis, Minnesota, US	
25	Win	11–9–1 (4)	Ario Soldati	PTS	4	Nov 26, 1934	Minneapolis AC, Minneapolis, Minnesota, US	
24	Loss	10–9–1 (4)	Pat Arnold	PTS	5	Nov 15, 1934	Auditorium, Minneapolis, Minnesota, US	
23	Draw	10–8–1 (4)	Russ Wasser	PTS	6	Oct 30, 1934	Auditorium, Minneapolis, Minnesota, US	
22	Loss	10–8 (4)	Eddie Wenstob	TKO	8 (10)	Oct 19, 1934	Empire Theatre, Edmonton, Alberta, Canada	
21	Win	10–7 (4)	Art McGovern	KO	1 (4)	Sep 21, 1934	Auditorium, Saint Paul, Minnesota, US	
20	Win	9–7 (4)	Freddie Eiler	PTS	6	Aug 16, 1934	Saint Paul, Minnesota, US	
19	Win	8–7 (4)	Johnny Maras	KO	1 (6)	Aug 2, 1934	Auditorium, Saint Paul, Minnesota, US	
18	Loss	7–7 (4)	Jack Charvez	NWS	6	Jul 23, 1934	Riverview Park, Sioux City, Iowa, US	
17	Loss	7–7 (3)	George Fritz	TKO	4 (?)	Jun 29, 1934	Fort Dodge, Iowa, US	
16	Win	7–6 (3)	Verne Trickle	NWS	6	May 16, 1934	Electric Park, Waterloo, Iowa, US	
15	Win	7–6 (2)	Jack Casper	KO	3 (4), 1:33	May 15, 1934	Duluth, Minnesota, US	
14	Win	6–6 (2)	Bill Anderson	KO	2 (4)	May 3, 1934	Auditorium, Saint Paul, Minnesota, US	
13	Loss	5–6 (2)	Dave Maier	KO	1 (6)	Apr 13, 1934	Auditorium, Minneapolis, Minnesota, US	
12	Loss	5–5 (2)	George Eckes	PTS	6	Mar 23, 1934	Shubert Theater, Minneapolis, Minnesota, US	
11	Loss	5–4 (2)	Pat Arnold	PTS	6	Mar 9, 1934	Shubert Theater, Minneapolis, Minnesota, US	
10	Loss	5–3 (2)	Pat Arnold	PTS	6	Mar 6, 1934	Auditorium, Saint Paul, Minnesota, US	
9	Loss	5–2 (2)	Larry Udell	TKO	4 (6)	Feb 19, 1934	Auditorium, Saint Paul, Minnesota, US	
8	Win	5–1 (2)	George Eckes	KO	3 (4)	Feb 1, 1934	Auditorium, Minneapolis, Minnesota, US	
7	Win	4–1 (2)	Barney McLaughlin	KO	1 (4)	Nov 27, 1933	Minneapolis A.C., Minneapolis, Minnesota, US	
6	Win	3–1 (2)	Mike Schwerbach	NWS	4	Nov 1, 1933	Auditorium, Minneapolis, Minnesota, US	
5	Loss	3–1 (1)	Porky McPartlin	NWS	4	Oct 17, 1933	Auditorium, Saint Paul, Minnesota, US	
4	Win	3–1	Barney McLaughlin	KO	2 (4), 1:54	Oct 10, 1933	Auditorium, Minneapolis, Minnesota, US	
3	Win	2–1	Tiger Cy Bielfeldt	KO	5 (6), 0:23	Oct 5, 1933	Fargo Auditorium, Fargo, North Dakota, US	
2	Loss	1–1	Johnny Simpson	PTS	4	Sep 18, 1933	Rochester, New York, US	
1	Win	1–0	Harry Bryan	KO	6 (6)	Sep 7, 1933	Sioux Falls, Iowa, US	

=== Unofficial record ===
155 fights	104 wins	46 losses
By knockout	72	12
By decision	32	33
By disqualification	0	1
Draws	4	
No contests	1	

Record with the inclusion of newspaper decisions in the win/loss/draw column.

No.	Result	Record	Opponent	Type	Round, time	Date	Location	Notes
155	Loss	104–46–4 (1)	Rocky Marciano	RTD	6 (10)	Feb 13, 1952	Convention Hall, Philadelphia, Pennsylvania, US	
154	Loss	104–45–4 (1)	Joe Louis	KO	6 (15), 2:29	Jun 15, 1951	Madison Square Garden, New York City, New York, US	Lost BBBofC world heavyweight title
153	Win	104–44–4 (1)	Bruce Woodcock	RTD	4 (15), 3:00	Jun 6, 1950	White City Stadium, London, England, UK	Won vacant BBBofC world heavyweight title
152	Loss	103–44–4 (1)	Bruce Woodcock	DQ	4 (10), 1:40	Dec 6, 1948	Harringay Arena, London, England, UK	Low blow
151	Win	103–43–4 (1)	Pete Louthis	KO	5 (10)	May 19, 1948	Armory, Akron, Ohio, US	
150	Win	102–43–4 (1)	Buddy Walker	KO	1 (10), 0:44	May 4, 1948	Memorial Auditorium, Buffalo, New York, US	
149	Win	101–43–4 (1)	Gino Buonvino	KO	1 (10), 0:54	Mar 19, 1948	Madison Square Garden, New York City, New York, US	
148	Win	100–43–4 (1)	Alberto Marchione	TKO	8 (8), 1:37	Aug 11, 1947	Croke Park, New York City, New York, US	
147	Draw	99–43–4 (1)	Ted Lowry	PTS	10	Aug 7, 1947	Fall River Stadium, Fall River, Massachusetts, US	
146	Loss	99–43–3 (1)	Phil Muscato	UD	10	Apr 16, 1947	Memorial Auditorium, Buffalo, New York, US	
145	Win	99–42–3 (1)	Duilio Spagnolo	TKO	8 (10)	Mar 28, 1947	Boston Garden, Boston, Massachusetts, US	
144	Loss	98–42–3 (1)	Phil Muscato	SD	10	Mar 11, 1947	Memorial Auditorium, Buffalo, New York, US	
143	Loss	98–41–3 (1)	Fitzie Fitzpatrick	UD	10	Jan 28, 1947	Olympic Auditorium, Los Angeles, California, US	
142	Draw	98–40–3 (1)	Jimmy Richie	SD	10	Jan 20, 1947	Kiel Auditorium, Saint Louis, Missouri, US	
141	Win	98–40–2 (1)	Steve Ketchell	KO	3 (10)	Sep 26, 1946	Casino, Fall River, Massachusetts, US	
140	Win	97–40–2 (1)	Pete Louthis	TKO	5 (10), 2:33	Sep 18, 1946	Arcadia Ballroom, Providence, Rhode Island, US	
139	Loss	96–40–2 (1)	Elmer Ray	KO	2 (10), 1:39	Aug 28, 1946	Ebbets Field, New York City, New York, US	
138	Win	96–39–2 (1)	Johnny White	UD	10	Jul 29, 1946	Coney Island Velodrome, New York City, New York, US	
137	Win	95–39–2 (1)	Jimmy O'Brien	UD	10	Jun 13, 1946	Rubber Bowl, Akron, Ohio, US	
136	Win	94–39–2 (1)	Bob Garner	KO	2 (10)	May 15, 1946	Armory, Akron, Ohio, US	
135	Win	93–39–2 (1)	Lindy Elliott	KO	2 (10), 1:35	May 1, 1946	Armory, Akron, Ohio, US	
134	NC	92–39–2 (1)	Arturo Godoy	NC	8 (10)	Mar 1, 1946	Chicago Stadium, Chicago, Illinois, US	Fight stopped for excessive clinching
133	Loss	92–39–2	Al Hoosman	UD	10	Jan 7, 1946	Madison Square Garden, New York City, New York, US	
132	Win	92–38–2	Dixie Oliver	KO	1 (10)	Dec 22, 1945	Ridgewood Grove, New York City, New York, US	
131	Win	91–38–2	Al Hoosman	UD	10	Dec 3, 1945	St. Nicholas Arena, New York City, New York, US	
130	Win	90–38–2	Kid Riviera	KO	3 (10)	Nov 7, 1945	Municipal Auditorium, Kansas City, Missouri, US	
129	Win	89–38–2	Gus Dorazio	UD	10	Dec 15, 1944	Auditorium, Saint Paul, Minnesota, US	
128	Loss	88–38–2	Joe Baksi	MD	10	Aug 7, 1944	Wrigley Field, Chicago, Illinois, US	
127	Loss	88–37–2	Joe Baksi	UD	12	May 26, 1944	Madison Square Garden, New York City, New York, US	
126	Win	88–36–2	Joe Baksi	SD	10	Mar 10, 1944	Madison Square Garden, New York City, New York, US	
125	Loss	87–36–2	Tami Mauriello	UD	10	Nov 5, 1943	Madison Square Garden, New York City, New York, US	
124	Win	87–35–2	Eddie Blunt	KO	1 (10), 1:02	Oct 22, 1943	Arena, Cleveland, Ohio, US	
123	Loss	86–35–2	Eddie Blunt	SD	10	Oct 5, 1943	Armory, Akron, Ohio, US	
122	Win	86–34–2	Lou Nova	KO	2 (10)	Aug 9, 1943	Wrigley Field, Chicago, Illinois, US	
121	Win	85–34–2	Lem Franklin	KO	8 (10), 2:55	Apr 16, 1943	Chicago Stadium, Chicago, Illinois, US	
120	Win	84–34–2	Jack Marshall	KO	2 (10)	Mar 15, 1943	Municipal Auditorium, Kansas City, Missouri, US	
119	Win	83–34–2	Lem Franklin	KO	10 (10)	Feb 15, 1943	Chicago Stadium, Chicago, Illinois, US	
118	Win	82–34–2	Nate Bolden	TKO	3 (10)	Jan 22, 1943	Chicago Stadium, Chicago, Illinois, US	
117	Loss	81–34–2	Jimmy Bivins	UD	10	Nov 27, 1942	Madison Square Garden, New York City, New York, US	
116	Win	81–33–2	Johnny Kapovich	TKO	2 (10)	Nov 16, 1942	Coliseum, Baltimore, Maryland, US	
115	Loss	80–33–2	Tami Mauriello	UD	10	Oct 30, 1942	Madison Square Garden, New York City, New York, US	
114	Win	80–32–2	Johnny Flynn	KO	4 (10), 2:25	Sep 22, 1942	Armory, Akron, Ohio, US	
113	Win	79–32–2	Tony Musto	UD	10	Sep 17, 1942	Olympia Stadium, Detroit, Michigan, US	
112	Loss	78–32–2	Tony Musto	SD	10	Aug 21, 1942	Griffith Stadium, Washington, DC, US	
111	Win	78–31–2	Bill Poland	KO	9 (10)	Jul 21, 1942	Scott Stadium, Toledo, Ohio, US	
110	Win	77–31–2	Lou Nova	TKO	8 (10)	May 25, 1942	Griffith Stadium, Washington, DC, US	
109	Win	76–31–2	Jack Marshall	PTS	10	Apr 24, 1942	Toledo, Ohio, US	
108	Win	75–31–2	Wallace Cross	KO	9 (10)	Mar 23, 1942	Laurel Garden, Newark, New Jersey, US	
107	Win	74–31–2	Ted Wint	TKO	9 (10)	Mar 18, 1942	New York Coliseum, New York City, New York, US	
106	Win	73–31–2	Neville Beech	TKO	4 (10)	Feb 2, 1942	Turner's Arena, Washington, DC, US	
105	Win	72–31–2	Buddy Knox	TKO	5 (10), 3:00	Dec 2, 1941	Armory, Paterson, New Jersey, US	
104	Win	71–31–2	Jack Marshall	MD	10	Nov 28, 1941	Olympia Stadium, Detroit, Michigan, US	
103	Win	70–31–2	Tony Degutis	KO	1 (6), 2:08	Oct 31, 1941	Olympia Stadium, Detroit, Michigan, US	
102	Win	69–31–2	Ralph Kosky	KO	1 (3)	Oct 17, 1941	Olympia Stadium, Detroit, Michigan, US	
101	Win	68–31–2	Lou Brooks	KO	6 (10)	Sep 17, 1941	Wilmington Park, Wilmington, Delaware, US	
100	Win	67–31–2	Claudio Villar	KO	4 (10), 2:55	Aug 27, 1941	Griffith Stadium, Washington, DC, US	
99	Loss	66–31–2	Harry Bobo	KO	2 (10)	Aug 12, 1941	Forbes Field, Pittsburgh, Pennsylvania, US	
98	Win	66–30–2	Solly Krieger	PTS	10	Jul 22, 1941	Ebbets Field, New York City, New York, US	
97	Win	65–30–2	Erv Sarlin	UD	10	Jul 14, 1941	Hickey Park, Millvale, Pennsylvania, US	
96	Win	64–30–2	King Kong	KO	6 (10)	Jun 26, 1941	Municipal Stadium, Baltimore, Maryland, US	
95	Loss	63–30–2	Harry Bobo	SD	10	May 26, 1941	Forbes Field, Pittsburgh, Pennsylvania, US	
94	Win	63–29–2	Mike Alfano	TKO	3 (10)	Apr 7, 1941	Atlanta, Georgia, US	
93	Win	62–29–2	Henry Wacker	KO	2 (10), 1:43	Mar 17, 1941	Auditorium, Saint Paul, Minnesota, US	
92	Win	61–29–2	Selman Martin	NWS	10	Feb 19, 1941	Coliseum, Des Moines, Iowa, US	
91	Loss	60–29–2	Billy Conn	UD	12	Nov 29, 1940	Madison Square Garden, New York City, New York, US	
90	Win	60–28–2	Arne Andersson	TKO	8 (10)	Oct 9, 1940	Auditorium, Saint Paul, Minnesota, US	
89	Win	59–28–2	Andy Miller	KO	1 (8), 1:43	Sep 16, 1940	Coliseum, Des Moines, Iowa, US	Won vacant USA Iowa heavyweight title
88	Win	58–28–2	Bob Nestell	KO	3 (10), 0:55	Aug 19, 1940	Riverview Park, Des Moines, Iowa, US	
87	Win	57–28–2	Domingo Valin	TKO	2 (10)	Aug 5, 1940	Lexington Park, Saint Paul, Minnesota, US	
86	Win	56–28–2	Billy Miske Jr.	KO	3 (10), 2:24	Jul 15, 1940	Lexington Park, Saint Paul, Minnesota, US	
85	Win	55–28–2	Johnny Whiters	NWS	8	Jun 24, 1940	Riverview Park, Des Moines, Iowa, US	
84	Win	54–28–2	Red Bruce	KO	4 (10)	Jun 13, 1940	Electric Park, Waterloo, Iowa, US	
83	Win	53–28–2	Eddie Boyle	KO	1 (10), 2:50	Apr 11, 1940	Coliseum, Des Moines, Iowa, US	
82	Loss	52–28–2	Johnny Whiters	MD	10	Mar 28, 1940	Municipal Auditorium, Saint Louis, Missouri, US	
81	Win	52–27–2	Jim Robinson	TKO	3 (8)	Jan 10, 1940	Madison Square Garden, New York City, New York, US	
80	Win	51–27–2	Arne Andersson	PTS	8	Dec 29, 1939	City Auditorium, Omaha, Nebraska, US	Not to be confused with Arne Andersson
79	Win	50–27–2	Eddie Simms	NWS	10	Dec 18, 1939	Coliseum, Des Moines, Iowa, US	
78	Win	49–27–2	Maurice Strickland	KO	3 (10)	Dec 4, 1939	Coliseum, Des Moines, Iowa, US	
77	Win	48–27–2	Pal Silvers	KO	3 (10)	Nov 24, 1939	Armory, Mason City, Iowa, US	
76	Loss	47–27–2	Buddy Baer	NWS	8	Oct 30, 1939	Coliseum, Des Moines, Iowa, US	
75	Win	47–26–2	Louis Gray	KO	2 (6)	Oct 9, 1939	Riverview Park, Des Moines, Iowa, US	
74	Win	46–26–2	Jack O'Sullivan	TKO	2 (4), 1:04	Sep 20, 1939	Briggs Stadium, Detroit, Michigan, US	
73	Win	45–26–2	Lester Miller	KO	1 (6)	Sep 5, 1939	Belmont Park, Garfield, New Jersey, US	
72	Win	44–26–2	Johnny Sionas	RTD	2 (6)	Sep 1, 1939	Atlantic Stadium, Long Branch, New Jersey, US	
71	Win	43–26–2	Danny LaMarre	TKO	2 (6)	Aug 8, 1939	Western League Baseball Park, Des Moines, Iowa, US	
70	Win	42–26–2	Henry Jones	RTD	7 (10)	Jul 28, 1939	Electric Park, Waterloo, Iowa, US	
69	Win	41–26–2	Johnny Brown	TKO	1 (6)	Jul 24, 1939	Hill Baseball Park, Cedar Rapids, Iowa, US	
68	Loss	40–26–2	Andy Miller	NWS	8	Jul 17, 1939	Riverview Park, Sioux City, Iowa, US	
67	Win	40–25–2	Johnny Brown	PTS	6	Mar 22, 1939	Lexington Park, Saint Paul, Minnesota, US	
66	Loss	39–25–2	Lem Franklin	KO	2 (10)	Mar 20, 1939	Marigold Gardens, Chicago, Illinois, US	
65	Win	39–24–2	Tom Kenneally	KO	9 (10)	Mar 1, 1939	Auditorium, Saint Paul, Minnesota, US	
64	Loss	38–24–2	Tom Kenneally	UD	8	Jan 27, 1939	White City Arena, Chicago, Illinois, US	
63	Win	38–23–2	Webster Epperson	KO	6 (6)	Jan 2, 1939	Palace Theatre, Minneapolis, Minnesota, US	
62	Win	37–23–2	Frankie Jones	KO	5 (8)	Jul 28, 1938	Riverview Park, Sioux City, Iowa, US	
61	Win	36–23–2	George Hill	KO	5 (8)	Jul 21, 1938	Riverview Park, Sioux City, Iowa, US	
60	Win	35–23–2	Tuffy Dial	NWS	6	Jul 7, 1938	Riverview Park, Sioux City, Iowa, US	
59	Loss	34–23–2	Domingo Valin	KO	6 (10)	May 5, 1937	Auditorium, Oakland, California, US	
58	Loss	34–22–2	Al Bray	PTS	8	Feb 17, 1937	Dreamland Auditorium, San Francisco, California, US	
57	Loss	34–21–2	Phil Brubaker	TKO	3 (10), 2:06	Nov 20, 1936	Dreamland Auditorium, San Francisco, California, US	
56	Win	34–20–2	Charley Coates	PTS	10	Oct 30, 1936	Dreamland Auditorium, San Francisco, California, US	
55	Win	33–20–2	Carl Walker	KO	6 (10)	Sep 30, 1936	Civic Auditorium, San Francisco, California, US	
54	Win	32–20–2	Ford Smith	KO	4 (10), 1:55	Sep 11, 1936	Dreamland Auditorium, San Francisco, California, US	
53	Loss	31–20–2	Sonny Boy Walker	PTS	10	Aug 12, 1936	Civic Auditorium, San Francisco, California, US	
52	Loss	31–19–2	Sonny Boy Walker	PTS	8	Jul 22, 1936	Civic Auditorium, San Francisco, California, US	
51	Win	31–18–2	Don Conn	PTS	10	Jul 17, 1936	Coliseum, San Diego, California, US	
50	Win	30–18–2	Danny Alberts	TKO	4 (10)	Jul 3, 1936	Coliseum, San Diego, California, US	
49	Loss	29–18–2	Hank Hankinson	PTS	10	Jun 12, 1936	Coliseum, San Diego, California, US	
48	Win	29–17–2	Blondy Ryan	TKO	6 (10), 1:27	May 22, 1936	Coliseum, San Diego, California, US	
47	Loss	28–17–2	Alfred Rogers	PTS	10	Apr 17, 1936	Coliseum, San Diego, California, US	
46	Win	28–16–2	Buster Alexander	KO	3 (6)	Apr 9, 1936	Coliseum, San Diego, California, US	
45	Win	27–16–2	Coleman Johns	TKO	8 (10)	Apr 3, 1936	Coliseum, San Diego, California, US	
44	Win	26–16–2	Jack Darcy	TKO	2 (4)	Feb 28, 1936	Legion Stadium, Hollywood, California, US	
43	Win	25–16–2	Rush Heise	PTS	5	Jan 10, 1936	Chicago Stadium, Chicago, Illinois, US	
42	Win	24–16–2	Russ Wasser	PTS	5	Dec 27, 1935	Auditorium, Minneapolis, Minnesota, US	
41	Win	23–16–2	Peter Doss	PTS	3	Dec 27, 1935	Auditorium, Minneapolis, Minnesota, US	
40	Win	22–16–2	Verne Trickle	PTS	8	Sep 19, 1935	Auditorium, Saint Paul, Minnesota, US	
39	Win	21–16–2	Eddie Slake	PTS	4	Aug 7, 1935	Comiskey Park, Chicago, Illinois, US	
38	Loss	20–16–2	Frank Androff	PTS	6	Jun 13, 1935	Auditorium, Minneapolis, Minnesota, US	
37	Loss	20–15–2	Andy Miller	NWS	6	May 27, 1935	Riverview Park, Sioux City, Iowa, US	
36	Win	20–14–2	Bill Kemp	KO	2 (4)	May 20, 1935	Armory, Minneapolis, Minnesota, US	
35	Win	19–14–2	Andy Miller	TKO	2 (6)	May 2, 1935	Auditorium, Saint Paul, Minnesota, US	
34	Draw	18–14–2	Verne Trickle	NWS	8	Apr 18, 1935	Opera House, Armstrong, Iowa, US	
33	Loss	18–14–1	Jack Gibbons	PTS	10	Apr 4, 1935	Auditorium, Minneapolis, Minnesota, US	
32	Win	18–13–1	Verne Trickle	PTS	6	Mar 25, 1935	Eagles' Club, Minneapolis, Minnesota, US	
31	Loss	17–13–1	Billy Treest	TKO	4 (6)	Mar 15, 1935	Chicago Stadium, Chicago, Illinois, US	
30	Loss	17–12–1	Frank Androff	PTS	6	Mar 4, 1935	Auditorium, Minneapolis, Minnesota, US	
29	Win	17–11–1	Jack Charvez	PTS	8	Jan 14, 1935	Auditorium, Minneapolis, Minnesota, US	
28	Win	16–11–1	Larry Udell	PTS	10	Jan 4, 1935	Auditorium, Minneapolis, Minnesota, US	
27	Win	15–11–1	Russ Wasser	PTS	6	Dec 28, 1934	Auditorium, Minneapolis, Minnesota, US	
26	Win	14–11–1	Verne Trickle	PTS	6	Dec 14, 1934	Auditorium, Minneapolis, Minnesota, US	
25	Win	13–11–1	Ario Soldati	PTS	4	Nov 26, 1934	Minneapolis AC, Minneapolis, Minnesota, US	
24	Loss	12–11–1	Pat Arnold	PTS	5	Nov 15, 1934	Auditorium, Minneapolis, Minnesota, US	
23	Draw	12–10–1	Russ Wasser	PTS	6	Oct 30, 1934	Auditorium, Minneapolis, Minnesota, US	
22	Loss	12–10	Eddie Wenstob	TKO	8 (10)	Oct 19, 1934	Empire Theatre, Edmonton, Alberta, Canada	
21	Win	12–9	Art McGovern	KO	1 (4)	Sep 21, 1934	Auditorium, Saint Paul, Minnesota, US	
20	Win	11–9	Freddie Eiler	PTS	6	Aug 16, 1934	Saint Paul, Minnesota, US	
19	Win	10–9	Johnny Maras	KO	1 (6)	Aug 2, 1934	Auditorium, Saint Paul, Minnesota, US	
18	Loss	9–9	Jack Charvez	NWS	6	Jul 23, 1934	Riverview Park, Sioux City, Iowa, US	
17	Loss	9–8	George Fritz	TKO	4 (?)	Jun 29, 1934	Fort Dodge, Iowa, US	
16	Win	9–7	Verne Trickle	NWS	6	May 16, 1934	Electric Park, Waterloo, Iowa, US	
15	Win	8–7	Jack Casper	KO	3 (4), 1:33	May 15, 1934	Duluth, Minnesota, US	
14	Win	7–7	Bill Anderson	KO	2 (4)	May 3, 1934	Auditorium, Saint Paul, Minnesota, US	
13	Loss	6–7	Dave Maier	KO	1 (6)	Apr 13, 1934	Auditorium, Minneapolis, Minnesota, US	
12	Loss	6–6	George Eckes	PTS	6	Mar 23, 1934	Shubert Theater, Minneapolis, Minnesota, US	
11	Loss	6–5	Pat Arnold	PTS	6	Mar 9, 1934	Shubert Theater, Minneapolis, Minnesota, US	
10	Loss	6–4	Pat Arnold	PTS	6	Mar 6, 1934	Auditorium, Saint Paul, Minnesota, US	
9	Loss	6–3	Larry Udell	TKO	4 (6)	Feb 19, 1934	Auditorium, Saint Paul, Minnesota, US	
8	Win	6–2	George Eckes	KO	3 (4)	Feb 1, 1934	Auditorium, Minneapolis, Minnesota, US	
7	Win	5–2	Barney McLaughlin	KO	1 (4)	Nov 27, 1933	Minneapolis A.C., Minneapolis, Minnesota, US	
6	Win	4–2	Mike Schwerbach	NWS	4	Nov 1, 1933	Auditorium, Minneapolis, Minnesota, US	
5	Loss	3–2	Porky McPartlin	NWS	4	Oct 17, 1933	Auditorium, Saint Paul, Minnesota, US	
4	Win	3–1	Barney McLaughlin	KO	2 (4), 1:54	Oct 10, 1933	Auditorium, Minneapolis, Minnesota, US	
3	Win	2–1	Tiger Cy Bielfeldt	KO	5 (6), 0:23	Oct 5, 1933	Fargo Auditorium, Fargo, North Dakota, US	
2	Loss	1–1	Johnny Simpson	PTS	4	Sep 18, 1933	Rochester, New York, US	
1	Win	1–0	Harry Bryan	KO	6 (6)	Sep 7, 1933	Sioux Falls, Iowa, US	

Titles in pretence
World Heavyweight Champion
BBBofC/EBU recognition
June 6, 1950 - February 13, 1952
