= Lou Nova =

American boxer (1913–1991)

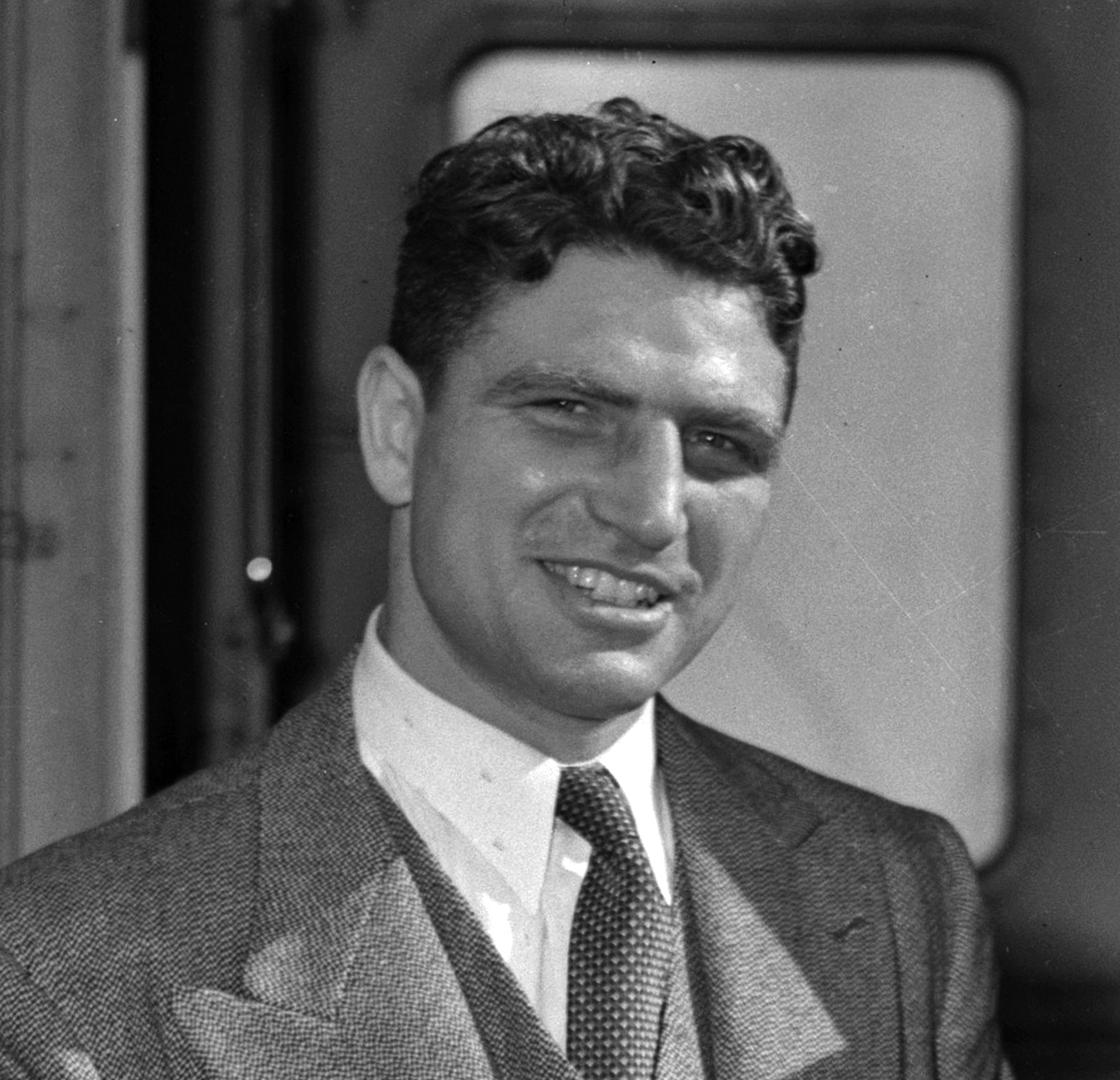

Personal information
- Nickname: The Cosmic Puncher
- Nationality: American
- Born: Jay L. Nova; March 16, 1913 Los Angeles, California
- Died: September 29, 1991 (aged 78) Sacramento, California
- Weight: Heavyweight

Boxing career
- Stance: Orthodox

Boxing record
- Total fights: 63
- Wins: 49
- Win by KO: 31
- Losses: 9
- Draws: 5

Lou Nova (March 16, 1913 – September 29, 1991) also called the Cosmic Puncher was an American boxer and actor. Born in Los Angeles, California, the 6 ft 3 1/2 in (1.92 m) Nova was the U.S. and World Amateur Boxing Champion in 1935. After turning pro, he remained undefeated in his first 22 matches, and won 40 fights in total. He was the first top rated boxer to practice yoga, and reportedly did headstands in the dressing room before his title bout with Joe Louis.

== Boxing career ==
In 1938, Nova gained an upset win over Britain's Tommy Farr in a 15-round decision. Nova had Farr near a knockout in the 14th round when Referee Eddie Josephs started counting as he lay in the ropes. However, Farr resumed the fight after the count reached two. Both men were in a state of exhaustion in the last round. This fight put Nova on the American boxing map as a potential heavyweight title contender.

He went on to defeat Max Baer in the first televised heavyweight prizefight June 1, 1939, on WNBT-TV in New York. The left side of Baer's face was battered out of shape after ten rounds of the most excruciating fighting he had ever undergone, and was bleeding so severely from a severe laceration of the lower lip he could hardly breathe when the referee stopped the bout. Nova beat Baer again in 1941, although Nova was knocked down for a brief one count in the 4th from a Baer right hand. Baer was subsequently knocked down by a right for a nine count. After he got up he was knocked down again by a right hand. Referee Donovan stopped the bout when the count was at two.

Nova was injured badly in a fight with Tony Galento and was treated at a hospital, almost losing an eye.

On September 29, 1941, he fought Joe Louis for the heavyweight title. Nova was knocked down once in the 6th round. Nova made a poor showing. According to Nat Fleischer (The Ring, December 1941, page 4) he didn't win a round and took a terrible beating in the sixth round. The end was somewhat controversial because the fight was stopped with just one second left in the round when Nova arose unsteadily from the knockdown.

Nova went on to box four more years, losing bouts to Lee Savold, Tami Mauriello, Lee Oma, and Joe Baksi.

== Acting career ==
After leaving the fight ring, he became an actor. His motion picture debut was as Kid Mandell in MGM's Swing Fever (1943) starring Kay Kyser and Marilyn Maxwell. Other movie roles include that as Hubert in the 20th Century Fox film noir crime drama Somewhere in the Night (1946) starring John Hodiak, and a cameo in Joe Palooka, Champ the same year.

Nova acted in over 20 movies, including What a Way to Go! (1964) and Blackbeard's Ghost (1968). He appeared in two stage roles, Big Jule in Guys and Dolls (1955), which ran for 16 performances, and O'Malley in the Broadway play The Happiest Millionaire (1956) starring Walter Pidgeon, which ran for 271 performances, in which Nova performed the popular baseball poem Casey at the Bat. Nova's guest spots on TV include Space Patrol, Hopalong Cassidy, ‘’Groucho Marx You Bet Your Life’’, General Electric Theater, 77 Sunset Strip, Shotgun Slade and Get Smart.

== Yoga ==
Nova was a practitioner of yoga and was trained by Pierre Bernard. In 1939, Nova trained for his fight with Max Baer at Bernard's estate in Nyack, New York. Nova claimed to have developed a "cosmic punch", based from his yoga training. The cosmic punch was mocked by Joe Louis who commented that he only received an "Earth Punch" from Nova.

Biographer Richard Bak has noted that "Nova was a student of Far Eastern metaphysics, including yoga, the Hindu theistic philosophy that teaches the suppression of all activity of mind, body, and will in order to liberate the spiritual self." Nova was a vegetarian.

== Retirement ==
He was inducted into World Boxing Hall of Fame in 1991, and into the Sacramento City College Athletic Hall of Fame in 1999.

Lou Nova died from cancer at age 78 in Sacramento, California.
