= Mairtin Thornton =

Irish boxer (died 1984)

Personal information
- Nationality: (Republic of Ireland) Irish
- Born: Spiddal, County Galway, Ireland
- Weight: Heavyweight

Boxing career
- Stance: Orthodox

Boxing record
- Total fights: 22
- Wins: 14
- Win by KO: 50%
- Losses: 8

Mairtin Thornton (died 1984) was an Irish heavyweight boxer in the 1940s. He was nicknamed the "Connemara Crusher".

Thornton was a native of Spiddal, Connemara, County Galway. He became the Irish Heavyweight Boxing champion in 1943. He fought Bruce Woodcock for the British Commonwealth Heavyweight title in 1945.

He boxed from 10 January 1938 until 23 April 1949. He won 14 bouts and lost 8.

When he retired from boxing he ran a pub in Spiddal, County Galway. He died in 1984.
