= Tami Mauriello =

American boxer (1923–1999)

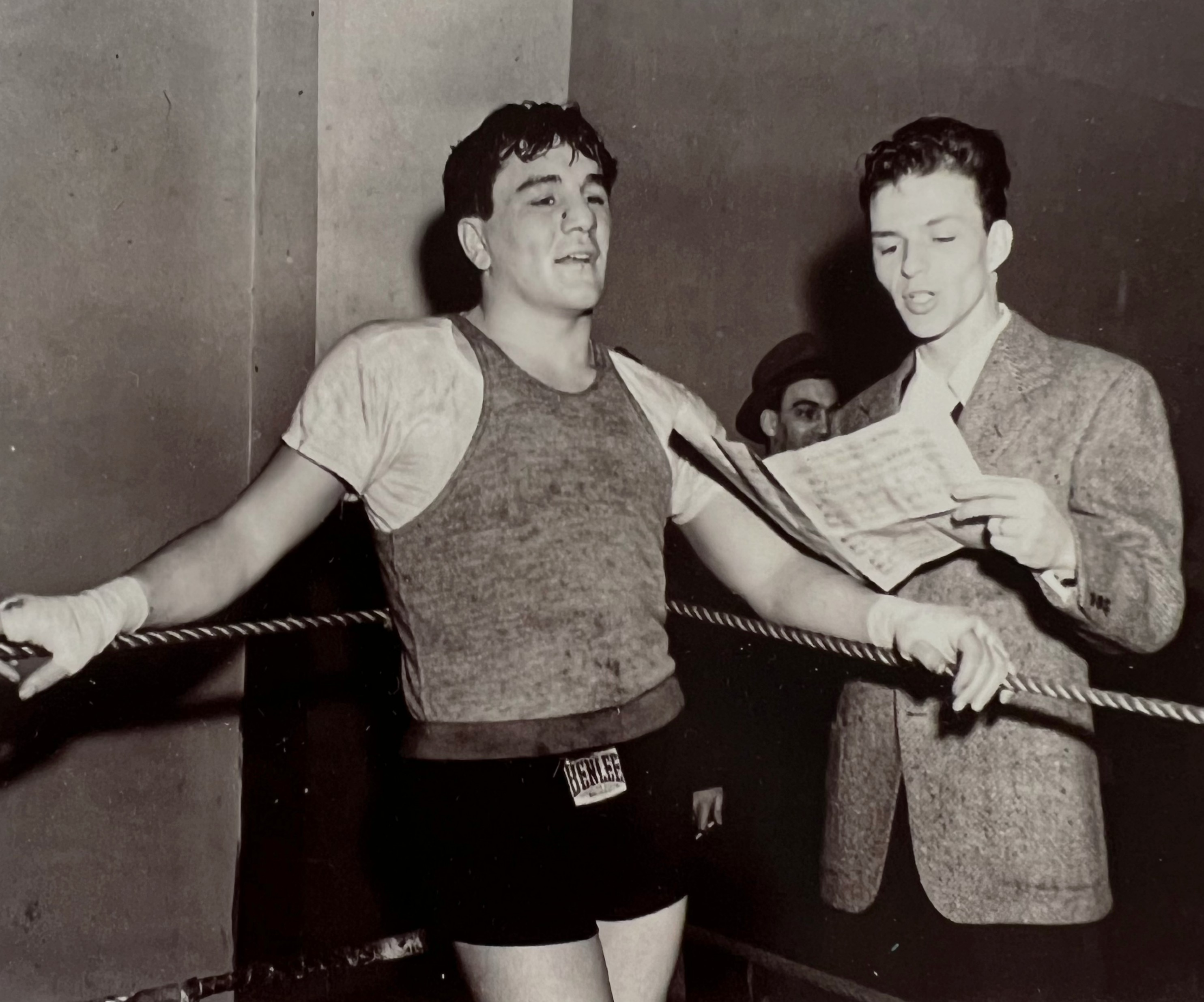
- Mauriello (left) with Frank Sinatra, circa 1946

Personal information
- Nickname: "The Bronx Barkeep"
- Born: Stefano Mauriello; May 24, 1923
- Died: December 3, 1999 (aged 76)
- Height: 5 ft 11.5 in (182 cm)

Boxing career
- Reach: 73 in (185 cm)
- Stance: Orthodox

Boxing record
- Total fights: 96
- Wins: 82
- Win by KO: 60
- Losses: 13
- Draws: 1
- No contests: 0

Stefano "Tami" Mauriello (May 24, 1923 – December 3, 1999) was an American professional boxer and actor of Italian descent who was world ranked in two divisions during the 1940s. He twice challenged for world titles, fighting Gus Lesnevich (twice) and Joe Louis for the world Light-heavyweight and Heavyweight titles, respectively. Mauriello's nickname was "The Bronx Barkeep".

== Professional boxing career ==
Mauriello made his professional boxing debut with a first-round knockout of Gilberto Ramirez Vazquez at Queensboro Arena, Long Island City, Queens, New York. Mauriello went undefeated in his first 24 fights, with 15 knockout wins. He lost his condition as an undefeated prospect when he faced future NYSAC world Middleweight champion Billy Soose, who himself had come off a close split decision victory over Ken Overlin and a unanimous decision victory against Tony Zale. Mauriello-Soose took place on January 3, 1941, at the Madison Square Garden in New York. The event marked the third time that Mauriello boxed as a professional in the arena. Tami Mauriello lost a razor-thin, split decision after ten rounds, one judge scoring the bout 6–4 in rounds for him (Boxing fights in New York were scored on a per-round basis instead of a "must system" as they get scored in modern times) while the other judge and the referee, Frank Fullam, scored the bout for Soose, 6-4 also.

Mauriello proceeded by taking on tough Bill McDowell (119–60–22) barely 5 weeks after the defeat to Soose, on February 11, 1941, at the New York Coliseum in the Bronx. Mauriello won by a sixth-round knockout. By this time, he was becoming known for his powerful right hand punch.

Two fights later, Mauriello fought young veteran (36-5-1 coming in) Steve Belloise on March 14, 1941. Belloise had twice fought Ken Overlin for the NYSAC's version of the world Light-Heavyweight championship and had lost both times by close fifteen-round decisions. Mauriello knocked Belloise out at 2:59 of the first round. Wins over 'Wildcat' O'Connor, Charlie Williams, Jimmy O'Boyne, Tony Cisco and Steve Mamakos followed, setting Mauriello up for his first world title challenge.

== World Light-Heavyweight Championship title fights ==
Mauriello then fought Gus Lesnevich, who was the National Boxing Association's Light-Heavyweight champion of the world, for the NBA's and the vacant NYSAC's version of the championship. The first encounter between Mauriello and Lesnevich was held August 26, 1941 at the Madison Square Garden. It was a close affair thorough, lasting the 15 rounds. In the end, Lesnevich was given a close, somewhat controversial split decision, judge John Potter scoring it 8-7 and judge Bill Healy 8-6-1 in rounds, respectively, for the champion, while referee Eddie Joseph had the fight 10-5 for Mauriello.

The closeness of the fight made a rematch possible; the second Mauriello-Lesnevich contest took place, once again at the Madison Square Garden, on November 14, 1941. This time around Lesnevich outscored Mauriello more comprehensively, with referee Arthur Donovan, judges George Lecron and Sam Austin each scoring the bout for the champion, 9–4–2, 9-5-1 and 10-2-3 in rounds, respectively.

== Move to Heavyweight ==
Mauriello next moved to the Heavyweight division, The New York Times announcing his fight against Jay D. Turner (24–19–2) as his first in that weight. Mauriello dropped Turner twice before the fight was stopped in the first round. He proceeded that by beating Gunnar Barlund, (41–13) by a knockout in 8, and the very experienced Buddy Knox (95–19–6), by a technical knockout when Knox could not come out of his corner to fight round 2. After four more wins, Mauriello met three world ranked Heavyweights in a row: on May 22, 1942, he fought Bob Pastor, (52–6–4) to a 10-round draw (tie); on July 14 of that year, he met Tony Musto (30–14–3), winning on points in 8 rounds; and nine days later, on July 23, he fought Red Burman, (78–20–2), winning by knockout in round 9. Each of these bouts took place in the New York City area; the Pastor and Burman ones at Madison Square Garden, and the Musto one at the New York Coliseum in the Bronx.

== Challenge for the "duration Heavyweight title" ==
After beating trail-horse Italo Collonello, Mauriello next fought Jimmy Bivins. Joe Louis, who had headed to the United States Army to help boost soldier morale during World War II, had symbolically handed Bivins a "duration championship belt", so the fight was billed as for the "duration world Heavyweight championship"-a symbolic title with no official recognition. Nevertheless, when the two boxers met in Cleveland, Ohio, September 15, 1942, Bivins won by a close, split ten-round decision. Mauriello survived a knockdown in round 1.

== Lee Savold, rematch with Bivins, Lee Oma ==
Another win over Collonello followed, and then he faced Lee Savold, another top Heavyweight contender of the era. Savold was 73-24-1 coming into their October 30 fight, and Mauriello beat him by a 10-round decision.

Of the four matches that followed Mauriello's defeat of Savold, two were rematches, with one win over Vince Pimpinella (33–44–9), a ten-round decision win, and one over Lou Nova, whom Mauriello knocked out in six rounds after being knocked down himself in the first round, sandwiched in. These two rematches were against Musto, whom Mauriello knocked out in seven rounds, (the fight's doctor stopped the fight because Musto suffered a dislocated jaw), and Bivins, who once again won a close decision over Mauriello, a majority ten round nod. Once again, Mauriello survived an early knockdown against Bivins, this time in the second round. The second Bivins-Mauriello bout involved no title at stake.

Six months later, Mauriello knocked out Gunnar Barlund in eight rounds in a rematch. Then, on November 5, 1943, Mauriello and Savold rematched; Mauriello went to the floor in round two, but recovered to win by a unanimous decision.

After another win against Buddy Knox, Mauriello met Pennsylvanian fighter, Joe Baksi, in front of 16,015 people at the Madison Square Garden on February 5, 1944. Baksi almost knocked Mauriello out in the first round, sending him to the canvas for a count of nine seconds. Mauriello recovered and gave Baksi a serious test the rest of the way, but Baksi prevailed by a ten-round unanimous decision.

Wins over Pimpinella, Knox and Danny Cox followed, and then a three-fight series with Lee Oma began. In the first bout, Mauriello came in as a substitute for old rival Baksi; on September 22, 1944, he defeated Oma by knockout in round eight. In their second bout, held on December 8 of the same year, Oma gained revenge by winning a ten-round unanimous decision, and in their rubber match, Mauriello outpointed Oma over ten rounds by unanimous vote, March 23, 1945. Each of these fights were held at Madison Square Garden.

The three-fight series against Oma was followed with first-round knockout wins over Steve Dudas and over Nova in another rematch. Mauriello's next seven fights were against boxers of average records, the notable exceptions in that span being a third fight with Barlund, won by a second-round technical knockout at the Coliseum Arena, New Orleans, Louisiana, and a second-round knockout of 14-5 Jerry Berthiaume at Cleveland, Ohio. On March 22, 1946, Mauriello and John Thomas (22–13–1) exchanged knockdowns at the Olympia Stadium in Detroit, Michigan, with Mauriello down in the first round and Thomas floored once in the second and twice in the third before Mauriello won the bout by a third-round knockout.

Mauriello then fought the famous British fighter, Bruce Woodcock, May 17, 1946 at the Madison Square Garden in New York. At stake was a possible title shot at world Heavyweight champion Joe Louis. In front of 14,000 fans, Mauriello stopped Woodcock in round five, earning his third world title shot and first shot at the world's Heavyweight title.

== Challenge of Joe Louis for the world's Heavyweight title ==
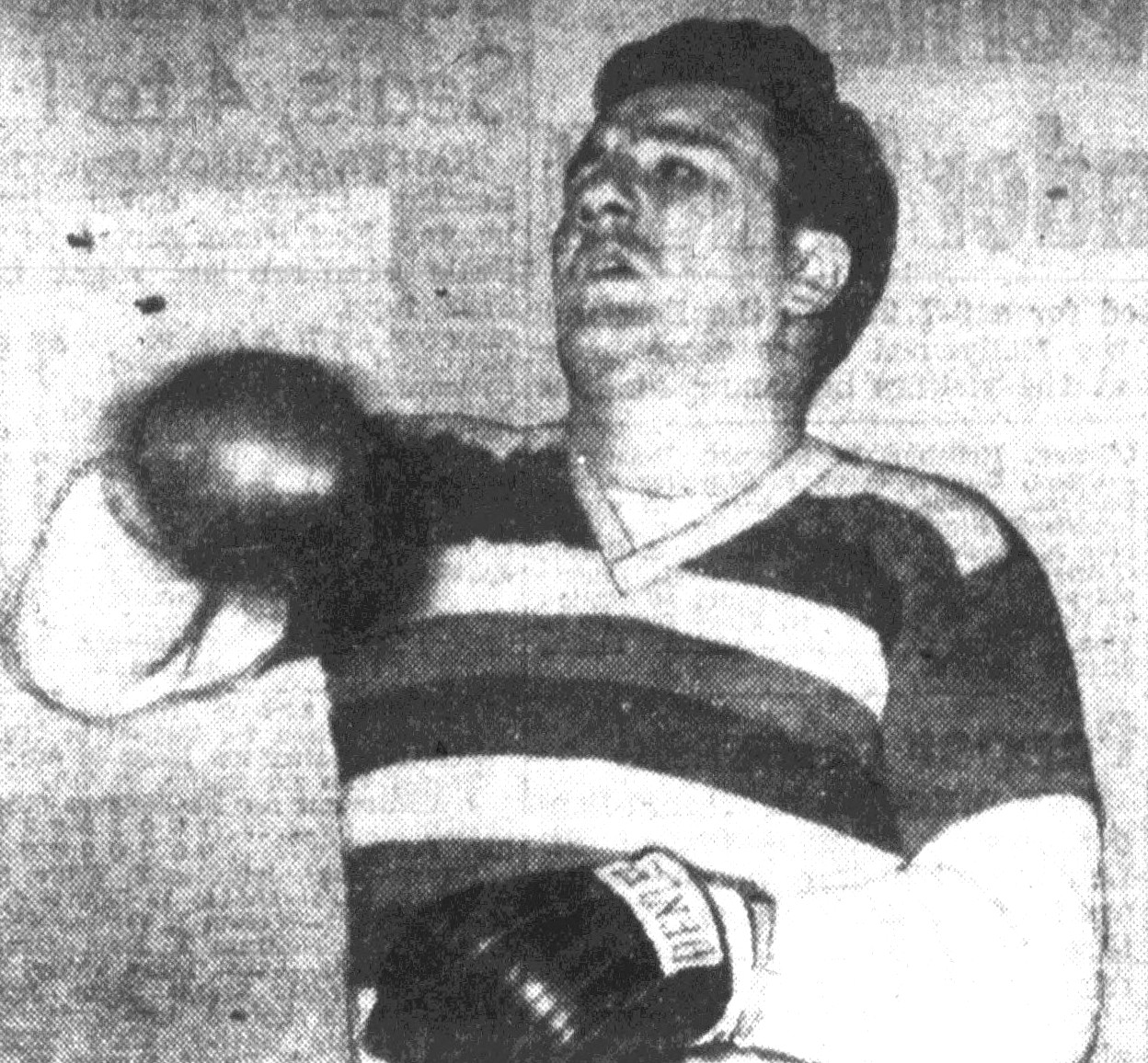
Mauriello, circa 1946

On September 18, 1946, Mauriello received his third world championship shot, and his first try at the world Heavyweight title, when he met Joe Louis at the Bronx's Yankee Stadium. Mauriello figured that because of his right-hand power, combined with Louis' layoff during the war years, and the fact that Louis was now 32 years old, he had a chance against the champion, who was 55-1 coming into their bout. In an action-packed fight, Mauriello staggered Louis with a hard right a few seconds after the beginning of the bout. Louis recovered, however, and ultimately retained the title by knocking down Mauriello twice before the first round ended. Mauriello failed to beat the count after the second knockdown. Mauriello caused controversy after the fight when he told a reporter on live radio, "I guess I'm just an unlucky son of a bitch".

== Career decline ==
Mauriello then fought Jimmy O'Brien January 8, 1947 in Chicago, scoring a first-round knockout. After two more wins, one over up and coming prospect Freddie Schott (41-4-1 coming in), he faced 25-10-1 Johnny Shkor at the Arena in Boston, Massachusetts, and suffered an upset defeat, beaten by a technical knockout in round seven. Angry at the bout's stoppage, Mauriello hit one of the ringside officials and was suspended for his actions. Furthermore, he suffered a cut that required hospitalization and 20 stitches.

Mauriello, despite the suspension, kept active and had a winning effort two months later in Brooklyn, New York against 30-10-2 Jimmy Carrollo, leading to a rematch with old foe, Gus Lesnevich. On July 30, 1947, the pair boxed again at the Madison Square Garden. Following a very close fight, Lesnevich was rewarded with a ten-round unanimous decision win, both the referee and one judge scoring the fight in his favor by one point, and the other judge favoring him by 2 points, thus making Mauriello 0-3 versus Lesnevich.

Two more wins followed, then a fourth face-off with Lesnevich came, this time on Halloween night, 1947. With referee Ruby Goldstein watching over, Lesnevich knocked Mauriello out in seven rounds. Mauriello recovered slightly and built a seven fight winning streak, including one over 26-7 Roy Taylor, and another one, his first fight abroad, against Joe Dominic, 16–7, on July 1, 1949, at the Nova Scotia Sports Centre, Sydney, Nova Scotia, Canada. He defeated Dominic by a sixth-round knockout after downing him four times during the course of this fight.

Back in the United States, Mauriello took on Mike Jacobs, a 13-11 trial horse boxer, on August 9, 1949, at New Bedford, Massachusetts. In what would turn out to be his final victory as a professional boxer, Mauriello took Jacobs out in round eight. A rematch with Dominic followed, in which Mauriello was beaten by unanimous decision in ten rounds, and then, on October 5, 1949, Mauriello had his last fight, at St. Nicholas Arena in New York, when he got knocked out in two rounds by the talented Argentine Cesar Silverio Brion.

Mauriello finished his career with 82 wins, 13 losses and 1 draw in 96 professional boxing matches, with 60 wins coming by knockout and 4 losses also by knockout.

He later went into wrestling, working in New York and New Jersey.

== Acting career ==
Mauriello acted in the boxing-themed film On the Waterfront in 1954, playing "Tillio".

Year	Title	Role	Notes
1954	On the Waterfront	Tillio	
