= Duilio Spagnolo =

Italian boxer

Personal information
- Nationality: Italy
- Born: Duilio Bertolo; November 14, 1922 Vicenza, Veneto, Italy
- Died: April 15, 2005 (aged 82)
- Weight: Heavyweight

Boxing career

Boxing record
- Total fights: 41
- Wins: 27
- Win by KO: 8
- Losses: 11
- Draws: 3

Duilio Spagnolo (November 14, 1922 – April 15, 2005) was the 1947 Italian heavyweight champion, who fought Americans Lee Savold and Roland La Starza. His 1950 bout against Rocky Marciano at Boston Garden was canceled. Spagnolo is No. 1 in the 1946 Cicogna Omnia Sport 55-card set and No. 533 in the 1950-1951 Albosports Didasco 675-card set.

Spagnolo fought in the United States mostly, but he enjoyed more success on the European boxing circuit.

On February 25, 1945, he made his professional boxing debut with an eight-round decision win over Luigi Musina, in Milan. He had his first career defeat in his second bout, when he faced Enrico Bertola on August 12 of that year, in Rome, dropping a ten-round decision. Ten days later, the pair would rematch, in Milan, and Spagnolo avenged the defeat with an eight-round points victory over Bertola.

As soon as his fourth fight, Spagnolo challenged for the Italian Heavyweight title, winning it with a twelve-round decision over Giovanni Martin, in San Remo. His next fight resulted in his first draw (tie) when he and Gino Buonvino fought ten rounds on April 15, 1946, in Milan.

Spagnolo defended his Italian Heavyweight title with a twelve-round decision over Mentore Mazzali in Piacenza on May 19, then lost it in a rematch with Musina, when Spagnolo was disqualified in the fourth round, on July 6, in Milan.

Spagnolo and Musina had an immediate rubber match, with Spagnolo regaining the title by a twelve-round decision on September 8 in Milan.

Spagnolo then abdicated the championship in order to move to the United States, where more famous opponents and the possibility of a world title shot awaited. The first indication that the latter was not going to come came on March 25, 1947, when he made his American debut, against a top ranked heavyweight, Lee Savold, who proceeded to give Spagnolo his first knockout loss, in round eight at Boston's famed Boston Garden.

Spagnolo then won nine fights in a row. He scored his only three career knockout wins during this streak, beating Mike Fisher in five, Louis Clark in three and Jim Lake in five. This pattern of beating almost completely unknown fighters would continue on for the rest of his career, but he managed to also fight with Roland La Starza (who later challenged Marciano for the World Heavyweight title), losing by a ten-round unanimous decision on November 16, 1950, in Brooklyn, New York, Coley Wallace, losing to him by a ten-round decision on December 11 of the same year in Washington, D.C., and Nick Barone (who later challenged Charles for the World Heavyweight title), losing to him by a ten-round unanimous decision on March 15, 1951, in Syracuse, New York.

During one point in his career Spagnolo was scheduled to fight Rocky Marciano. However Marciano's camp cancelled the upcoming bout when Marciano's hand was injured in training.

His fight with Barone was his last one, and he retired with 18 wins, 10 losses and four draws in 32 career bouts, with three knockout wins.
