= Freddie Mills =

British boxer (1919–1965)

- Freddie Mills in the 1952 film The Hundred Hour Hunt

Personal information
- Nicknames: The Bournemouth Bombshell; Fearless Freddie
- Born: Frederick Percival Mills; 26 June 1919 Bournemouth, Hampshire, England
- Died: 25 July 1965 (aged 46) London, England
- Height: 5 ft 10 1/2 in (179 cm)
- Weight: Light-heavyweight; Heavyweight

Boxing career
- Reach: 72 in (183 cm)
- Stance: Orthodox

Boxing record
- Total fights: 101
- Wins: 77
- Win by KO: 55
- Losses: 18
- Draws: 6
- No contests: 0

Frederick Percival Mills (26 June 1919 – 25 July 1965) was an English professional boxer who held the British, European and Commonwealth light heavyweight titles in the 1940s. In 1948, he won the NBA/BBBofC versions of the World Light Heavyweight Championship, which was the first title bout in Europe to be recognized by a New York-based (USA) sanctioning body. Mills was one of Britain's biggest boxing idols of the post-war era and remained a popular media personality after his retirement from the ring.

Once he had retired from boxing, Mills moved into boxing management and promotion, and pursued a career in entertainment, working in radio, television (notably as co-presenter of the early BBC TV music show, Six-Five Special between 1957 and 1958), and on the stage, as well as playing roles in a number of films between 1952 and 1965. He opened a Chinese restaurant in Soho before there was an established Chinatown in the area and also ran his own London nightclub until his mysterious death.

== Early life ==
He was born Frederick Percival Mills in Bournemouth, Hampshire, the youngest of the four children of Thomas James Mills, a totter and marine store dealer, and his wife Lottie Hilda Gray. He received a pair of boxing gloves when he was eleven, and he used to spar with his brother Charlie. He attended St Michael's School in Bournemouth until the age of fourteen, and then became an apprentice gardener and later a milkman's assistant. The milkman in question was Percy Cook, brother of former Welsh lightweight champion Gordon Cook, and Percy helped Mills develop his boxing skills.

== Professional career ==
=== Early career ===
Mills had three bouts in 1936 in a 11 stone novices’ competition, all of which he won by knockout. He subsequently signed professional terms with manager Bob Turner. He began fighting in fairground booths and at venues on the south coast. His first 64 fights, in 3½ years, most fighting as a middleweight, though often against heavier opponents, resulted in 48 wins, 9 losses and 7 draws. By late 1939 he was the Western Area middleweight champion, and in April 1940 he beat Eastern Area champion Ginger Sadd on points. At the time, Mills was ranked 9th best middleweight in Britain, and Sadd 2nd.

In January 1940 he joined the Royal Air Force and went on to become first a corporal physical training instructor and, by the following year, a sergeant, while continuing to box professionally. He fought Jock McAvoy, the British and Commonwealth middleweight champion, the fight made at 12st 9lbs, McAvoy having the previous year unsuccessfully fought Len Harvey for the British and Commonwealth light-heavyweight titles. The fight against McAvoy took place in Liverpool in August 1940 and Mills won a clear decision over ten rounds. Mills subsequent fought mainly at light heavyweight.

In 1941 he was taken on by new manager Ted Broadribb, and began an affair with Broadribb's daughter Chrissie, who was at the time married to South African boxer Don McCorkindale. In September 1941 he was disqualified for a low blow in the third round against Jack Hyams, suffering his first defeat in almost two years.

In November 1941 he stopped heavyweight Jim Wilde in the third round, despite conceding almost two and a half stones to the Welshman. In December 1941, he fought Jack London, a heavyweight who later (in 1944) won the British and Commonwealth heavyweight titles, Mills won on points over ten rounds despite conceding over three stones in weight to London. At this time Mills was nicknamed 'The Bournemouth Bombshell'.

=== British light-heavyweight title ===
Mills was due to fight McAvoy in January 1942 in a final eliminator for the British and Empire (later 'Commonwealth') light-heavyweight title, but withdrew from the fight, stating that wanted to concentrate on fighting at heavyweight and challenge for Len Harvey's title. He beat Tom Reddington at heavyweight later that month, but evidently had a change of heart, and in February 1942 fought McAvoy in a final eliminator for the light-heavyweight titles. The fight, in the Royal Albert Hall, ended after one round when McAvoy was forced to retire with an injured back. The way was open for Mills to challenge Len Harvey for the British and Empire light-heavyweight titles (Harvey at the time also holding the British heavyweight title).

The title fight took place on 20 June 1942, at White Hart Lane, Tottenham, in front of a crowd of 30,000. In the second round Mills caught Harvey with a powerful left hook and put him down for a count of nine. When Harvey got up Mills hit him with a left uppercut, knocking him through the ropes and off the ring canvas, and in doing so he won via a knockout. The fight created a sensation and Mills was talked of as a future challenger for Joe Louis. Mills now had the light-heavyweight titles. Harvey had also been considered world champion by the British Boxing Board of Control (BBBofC), but Mills decided not to accept the title, instead wishing to fight for American Gus Lesnevich's more recognised world title. Mills only fought competitively four times in the next two years, all of them wins inside the distance, although he fought several exhibition fights, including several bouts with McCorkindale. Difficulty in making fights led him to consider relinquishing his titles in 1943, expressing a desire to switch to all-in wrestling.

Len Harvey's retirement in early 1943 left the British and Empire heavyweight titles vacant. Mills and London were nominated to fight for the titles by the BBBofC in April that year, but after the fight was postponed three times, twice due to injuries sustained by London, they eventually met in September 1944. The fight took place at the Kings Hall, Belle Vue, Manchester, with Mills conceding just over three stone (19 kilos) in weight. Both men were at the time serving in the Royal Air Force. Mills showed speed and aggression, but London's superior strength and power were evident in the closing stages and the heavier man was awarded the decision after fifteen rounds.

Mills and London were set to fight again in February 1945, but London's RAF duties made it impossible for him to train. Instead, Mills fought former Scottish amateur heavyweight champion Ken Shaw, stopping him in the seventh round.

=== World title fight ===
In March 1945, Mills was posted to India and Burma as part of a touring party that also included Denis Compton, giving lectures and boxing demonstrations and taking part in exhibition bouts.

Mills returned to the UK and was demobilised in March 1946, and in May 1946 he was given a shot at Lesnevich's world light-heavyweight title. Mills' preparation was interrupted in April when his father died at his home in Bournemouth. The fight took place at Harringay Arena in front of 11,000 fans. Mills was not considered a serious threat to Lesnevich but performed better than many expected in what was described as a "slam-bang, punishing contest". Mills was floored heavily in the second round but recovered strongly and was cheered on by the British crowd. In the ninth round, Mills's aggression appeared to be turning the fight in his favour, and Lesnevich was troubled by cuts above his eyes. In the tenth, however, Lesnevich "exploded" to score two knockdowns and the referee stopped the contest.

Three weeks after losing his fight against Lesnevich, Mills fought British heavyweight Bruce Woodcock, losing a twelve-round fight on points after being knocked down in the fourth.

Mills returned in August 1946 with a first-round knockout of the Swedish heavyweight John Nilsson. In November 1946, Mills fought another heavyweight, American Joe Baksi. Mills suffered two badly cut eyes and retired after six rounds of what was described as a "disappointingly one-sided contest".

=== European title ===
In 1947, Mills again focused on the light-heavyweight division, and had three wins by knockout in the first half of the year (one against Italian champion Enrico Bertola and the third against South African champion Nick Wolmarans in Johannesburg) before losing in June by KO to American Lloyd Marshall.

In September 1947, Mills fought for the vacant European light-heavyweight title against the Belgian, Pol Goffaux, winning after Goffaux retired towards the end of the fourth round. Mills ended the year with a points win over French heavyweight Stephane Olek.

Mills defended the European title in February 1948, against the Spanish champion Paco Bueno, who was subjected to "terrific punishment" before being knocked out in the second round.

In April 1948 he beat the heavyweight Ken Shaw for a second time, in a final eliminator for the British title.

=== World title ===
On 26 July 1948, Mills was matched against Lesnevich for his second attempt at the world light heavyweight title. Mills was in much better shape for this fight, held at the White City Stadium, London in front of a 46,000 crowd. Lesnevich reportedly struggled to make the 175 pound limit, weighing in at 174¾ pounds, whereas Mills came in at 170½.

Lesnevich, who was a 1/3 betting favourite, suffered from cuts over the eyes from the opening round as Mills started strongly. The fight then settled down into a "remarkably dull" affair, which drew boos from the crowd and saw both men warned by the referee Teddy Waltham for the lack of action. In the tenth round, Mills rallied and floored Lesnevich heavily on two occasions. Lesnevich launched a "savage attack" in the twelfth and thirteenth rounds, but Mills responded in the last two sessions and at the end of fifteen rounds, the British boxer was awarded the decision by the referee.

Mills was set to defend his title against Lesnevich in September in New York, but the fight was cancelled due to Mills suffering severe headaches and bouts of dizziness since the July fight. In August medical opinion was sought and he was diagnosed with misaligned vertebrae at the base of the skull; It was decided that after two months rest and spinal treatment he could return to boxing.

In September 1948, Mills was challenged to a fight at light-heavyweight by Sugar Ray Robinson, but it was dismissed as "ridiculous" by promoter Jack Solomons.

Mills beat another heavyweight, Johnny Ralph, in Johannesburg in November 1948 in an eliminator for the Empire heavyweight title. Mills broke a metacarpal in his right hand during the fight.

In early 1949, after a well-received appearance with Arthur Askey on the radio show How Do You Do?, Mills expressed a desire to work in radio after his boxing career ended, stating "I am not going on fighting for ever. I've got some money now. I reckon that being on the radio would just about suit me." In March 1949, Mills signed a promotional contract with Solomons, which made any return fight with Lesnevich more likely to take place in Britain.

In June 1949, Mills challenged Bruce Woodcock for his British, Empire, and European heavyweight titles. The fight was also recognised as an eliminator for the British version of the World Heavyweight Championship. They fought at the White City Stadium, with Mills conceding twenty pounds in weight to his opponent. Mills bloodied the heavyweight's nose but was floored four times before being knocked out in the fourteenth round.

Shortly after the Woodcock fight, Mills expressed a willingness to defend his light-heavyweight title later that year, although he wanted the purse money to be spread over five years, for tax reasons, and to guarantee him an income for several years after retiring from the ring, Mills clearly not intending to keep fighting for much longer.

In September 1949, a contract was signed for Mills to defend his world title against American Joey Maxim. After several dates and venues were proposed, the fight was finally set for 24 January 1950 at Earls Court, London. Mills decided to leave long-time trainer Nat Sellers and train himself for the fight. Mills began strongly but Maxim, who "boxed beautifully", began to overhaul him. Mills, according to press reports, looked for a knockout win, but in the tenth round he was floored by a left right combination. Mills took the count in a sitting position before falling sideways and being counted out. Mills was assisted to his corner and was checked by a doctor before leaving the ring. He had fought the last four rounds with three of his teeth knocked out and one embedded in the gum of his upper jaw. Mills' reign as world champion was over, and the next day Broadribb announced that he had decided to retire, a decision made formal on 15 February when Mills wrote to BBBofC to confirm his retirement and to relinquish his British, European, and Empire light-heavyweight titles, aged 30.

== Personal life ==
On 30 September 1948, Mills married Christine Marie McCorkindale ("Chrissie") (25 December 1913 – 4 November 1994) at Herne Hill Methodist Church. She had a son, Donnie, by former husband Don McCorkindale. They honeymooned in South Africa, where they stayed with McCorkindale, with whom Mills was good friends.

Mills and his wife went on to have two daughters, Susan Marhea (born 17 June 1952) and Amanda Christine Elizabeth (born 12 June 1958). They lived, with Donnie, at Joggi Villa in Denmark Hill in south London from June 1947.

== Retirement and other business interests ==
=== Boxing management and promotion ===
A month after confirming his retirement, Mills was granted a manager's licence by the BBBofC, taking on Brixton heavyweight Terry O'Connor as his first boxer. In June 1950, Mills' autobiography, Twenty Years, was published. In 1951 he gained a promoter's licence and put on many successful events until the mid-1950s.

During the latter stages of his boxing career, Mills suffered from frequent headaches, which continued after his retirement. Mills taught boxing classes at the Streatham Youth Centre in the early 1960s.

In October 1962 his world championship belt was stolen from his car, but it was returned three days later with a note from the thief apologising for stealing it.

=== Entertainment ===
Mills made an appearance on the television show Rooftop Rendezvous in February 1950, earning praise for his comedy skills. In May 1950 he did his first television commentary on the Dennis Powell v. Mel Brown card at Birmingham, broadcast by the BBC, which saw him described as "discovery of the week" by the Daily Herald. In late 1950 he again appeared on radio as a presenter of the programme Calling All Forces. In March 1952 he was given a 12-week Saturday radio show by the BBC. In 1952 he made his first film appearance in Emergency Call, going on to take small rôles in a dozen films.

In September 1954 he was knocked unconscious during a TV sketch after being hit over the head with a real stool rather than the prop that should have been used. He made appearances on several other television and radio shows, and became a presenter on the BBC pop-music programme Six-Five Special from February 1957 until being dropped from the show in March 1958, although he returned for the final show at the end of the year. He went on to perform on stage as part of The Dickie Henderson Show later that year, staying with Henderson until the early 1960s. In 1959 he performed in Dick Whittington in Hulme, playing Idle Jack. In 1961 he appeared in a Summer stage show in Brighton with Alfred Marks.

He was the subject of This Is Your Life, when he was surprised by Eamonn Andrews, having been led into the foyer of London's Earls Court Exhibition Centre by sports journalist Derrick Collier. The episode was broadcast on 2 January 1961.

By 1963, television appearances had become less frequent, although he appeared on variety show Big Night Out in January 1964.

=== Property, restaurant and night club ===
Mills began investing in property in the late 1940s, acquiring several houses and flats. In 1946 he opened the Freddie Mills Chinese Restaurant at 143 Charing Cross Road as a joint venture with Charles Luck and actor Andy Ho. He also briefly jointly owned a café in Peckham with his friend and investment adviser Bill Bavin. By 1963 the Chinese restaurant was no longer profitable, and Mills and Ho converted it to a nightclub ('The Freddie Mills Nite Spot') at a cost of around £12,000, re-opening in May that year. After initially hoping to make the club a family venue, they were pressured into allowing 'hostesses' to work there, unknown to Mills a euphemism for prostitutes. He became friends with the Kray Twins, notorious criminals who frequented his club. In August 1963 Mills and Ho started the Freddie Mills Theatrical Agency, based at the club.

After its initial success his nightclub began to fail and he tried to sell it, without success. He sold off what property he had but was in serious financial difficulty.

== Death ==
On 24 July 1965, Mills was found dead in his car, parked in Goslett Yard, off an alleyway behind his nightclub. A fairground rifle was found in the car with Mills, who had been shot through his right eye. He had told the nightclub staff that he was going for a nap in his car, something that he often did. His body was found at approximately 11:45 p.m. by doorman Robert Deacon. An ambulance was not called until Mills's wife arrived over an hour later. A week or two previously, he had borrowed a 0.22 calibre rifle from May Ronaldson, whom he knew from his boxing booth days, and who ran a shooting gallery. Although the rifle was not in working order when borrowed, it had apparently been repaired and was found in the car alongside him. For whatever reason, still unknown and with no police in attendance, ambulance personnel removed Mills from his car, disturbing a possible crime scene, and transported his body to the Middlesex Hospital where he was pronounced dead.

The investigation into his death initially assumed murder, but within a couple of days, the police had decided not to investigate it as such. The coroner's inquest heard that the angle of the bullet was consistent with a self-inflicted wound, and it ruled his death a suicide.

Mills's funeral took place at St. Giles’ Parish Church, Camberwell, and he was buried in Camberwell New Cemetery in south London. The pallbearers included boxing promoter Jack Solomons, British Heavyweight Champion Henry Cooper, the Secretary of the BBBofC, Teddy Waltham, and entertainer Bruce Forsyth (who also gave the funeral address). His grave has a marble boxing glove on it, beneath which is an urn containing a real boxing glove.

Despite the wealth that Mills had gained from his boxing career (estimated at £100,000), and his property investments that earned him around £3,000 per year, Mills died with a net figure of only £387 to his name. His club had been up for sale since June 1963, but he had been unable to find a buyer. At the time of his death, he was heavily in debt to a crime syndicate, which led him to be both depressed and in fear of his life. He was rumoured to be making a stand against protection racketeers shortly before his death, a theory backed up by gangland enforcer Johnny Bradbury, who gave the name of the man he believed was responsible for killing Mills to the police, but they were unable to find evidence to pursue the matter. Two weeks before his death, Mills and Ho had been fined for liquor and gaming offences committed at the club, and Mills had asked for a catering job at a pub near his home.

A star-studded benefit show, The Freddie Mills Night, was staged in February 1966 to raise money to support his widow and children.

Following his death, several lurid theories sprang up, such as that Mills, married with children, had been arrested in a public toilet and charged with indecency, and that his suicide had been staged by Chinese gangsters who were seeking to take over his club. In 2002, a book about Mills by former journalist Michael Litchfield contained allegations that at the time of his death he was about to be exposed as the serial killer known as "Jack the Stripper", the unidentified person responsible for the eight Hammersmith nude murders in 1964–65. Litchfield also claimed that Mills had had a homosexual relationship with singer Michael Holliday, and possibly also was sexually involved with notorious gangster Ronnie Kray.

Mills's family and friends did not accept the suicide verdict, and according to Bavin, his widow received a phone call some time after his death from a woman who told her who was responsible for killing him. In 1968, Leonard "Nipper" Read began investigating the case again at Chrissie's behest. There were some inconsistencies regarding the death: two shots had been fired in the car, one from a front seat which hit the nearside front door, and the one that had killed Mills while he was sitting on the car's back seat, Mills's body was found with its hands resting on his knees and the gun in a position out of Mills's reach, and there were no fingerprints found on it.

In November 1970, police began investigating again after a constituent had told MP Michael O'Halloran that a man had admitted killing Mills, although the investigation was soon ended.

Phoenix Television produced a documentary about the death of Mills, Murder in Soho: Who Killed Freddie Mills? Directed by Simon Dales, it was first broadcast by the BBC on 1 August 2018. The film explored the possibility that American mobster, Meyer Lansky, colluded in the killing of Mills; Roger Huntman, said his father, Benny Huntman, a boxing manager was involved in the murder.

== Evaluation as a boxer ==
Volunteer editors from the Doncaster-based website BoxRec, rate Mills as the fourteenth-best British boxer of all time, the second-best British boxer of all time in the light-heavyweight division (behind John Conteh), and the thirty-sixth-best light-heavyweight in the history of boxing.

== Selected filmography ==
- Emergency Call (1952) - Tim Mahoney
- One Jump Ahead (1955) - Bert Tarrant
- Fun at St. Fanny's (1955) - Harry The Scar
- Breakaway (1955) - Pat
- Kill Me Tomorrow (1957) - Waxy Lister
- Six-Five Special (1958) - Studio Commissionaire / Lighting Man
- Chain of Events (1958) - Tiny
- Carry On Constable (1960) - Jewel Thief
- Carry On Regardless (1961) - Lefty
- This Is Your Life (1961) S.6 Ed.16
- Saturday Night Out (1964) - Joe
- The Comedy Man (1964) - Indian Chief (uncredited)
- Joey Boy (1965) - Sergeant (uncredited) (final film role)

== Professional boxing record ==
101 fights	77 wins	18 losses
By knockout	55	7
By decision	22	10
By disqualification	0	1
Draws	6	

No.	Result	Record	Opponent	Type	Round	Date	Location	Notes
101	Loss	77–18–6	Joey Maxim	KO	10 (15)	24 Jan 1950	Earls Court Empress Hall, Kensington, London, England	Lost NBA, BBBofC, and The Ring light heavyweight titles
100	Loss	77–17–6	Bruce Woodcock	KO	14 (15)	2 Jun 1949	White City Stadium, White City, London, England	For European, Commonwealth, and British heavyweight titles
99	Win	77–16–6	Johnny Ralph	KO	8 (10)	6 Nov 1948	Wembley Stadium, Johannesburg, Gauteng, South Africa	
98	Win	76–16–6	Gus Lesnevich	PTS	15	26 Jul 1948	White City Stadium, White City, London, England	Won NBA, BBBofC, and The Ring light heavyweight titles
97	Win	75–16–6	Ken Shaw	RTD	1 (12)	20 Apr 1948	Harringay Arena, Harringay, London, England	
96	Win	74–16–6	Pacho Bueno	KO	2 (15)	17 Feb 1948	Harringay Arena, Harringay, London, England	Retained European light heavyweight title
95	Win	73–16–6	Stephane Olek	PTS	10	28 Nov 1947	King's Hall, Belle Vue, Manchester, Lancashire, England	
94	Win	72–16–6	Pol Goffaux	RTD	4 (15)	8 Sep 1947	Harringay Arena, Harringay, London, England	Won vacant European light heavyweight title
93	Loss	71–16–6	Lloyd Marshall	KO	5 (10)	3 Jun 1947	Harringay Arena, Harringay, London, England	
92	Win	71–15–6	Nick Wolmarans	KO	5 (10)	29 Apr 1947	Wembley Stadium, Johannesburg, Gauteng, South Africa	
91	Win	70–15–6	Enrico Bertola	KO	5 (10)	17 Feb 1947	Royal Albert Hall, Kensington, London, England	
90	Win	69–15–6	Willie Quentemeijer	KO	2 (10)	20 Jan 1947	Royal Albert Hall, Kensington, London, England	
89	Loss	68–15–6	Joe Baksi	RTD	6 (10)	5 Nov 1946	Harringay Arena, Harringay, London, England	
88	Win	68–14–6	John Nilsson	KO	1 (10)	13 Aug 1946	Withdean Stadium, Brighton, Sussex, England	
87	Loss	67–14–6	Bruce Woodcock	PTS	12	4 Jun 1946	Harringay Arena, Harringay, London, England	
86	Loss	67–13–6	Gus Lesnevich	TKO	10 (15)	14 May 1946	Harringay Arena, Harringay, London, England	For NYSAC, NBA, and The Ring light heavyweight titles
85	Win	67–12–6	Ken Shaw	TKO	7 (8)	7 Feb 1945	Queensberry Club, Soho, London, England	
84	Loss	66–12–6	Jack London	PTS	15	15 Sep 1944	King's Hall, Belle Vue, Manchester, Lancashire, England	For vacant Commonwealth and British heavyweight titles
83	Win	66–11–6	Al Delaney	KO	5 (10)	25 May 1944	Royal Albert Hall, Kensington, London, England	
82	Win	65–11–6	Bert Gilroy	TKO	8 (10)	16 Feb 1944	Queensberry Club, Soho, London, England	
81	Win	64–11–6	Al Robinson	KO	2 (10)	22 May 1943	Elland Road Football Ground, Leeds, Yorkshire, England	
80	Win	63–11–6	Al Robinson	RTD	6 (10)	23 Oct 1942	King's Hall, Belle Vue, Manchester, Lancashire, England	
79	Win	62–11–6	Len Harvey	KO	2 (15)	20 Jun 1942	White Hart Lane (Tottenham FC), Tottenham, London, England	Won Commonwealth and British light heavyweight titles
78	Win	61–11–6	Jock McAvoy	RTD	1 (12)	23 Feb 1942	Royal Albert Hall, Kensington, London, England	
77	Win	60–11–6	Tom Reddington	TKO	9 (10)	26 Jan 1942	Royal Albert Hall, Kensington, London, England	
76	Win	59–11–6	Jack London	PTS	10	8 Dec 1941	Royal Albert Hall, Kensington, London, England	
75	Loss	58–11–6	Tom Reddington	PTS	10	28 Nov 1941	King's Hall, Belle Vue, Manchester, Lancashire, England	
74	Win	58–10–6	Jim Wilde	KO	3 (8)	3 Nov 1941	Royal Albert Hall, Kensington, London, England	
73	Win	57–10–6	Tommy Martin	TKO	5 (?)	29 Sep 1941	Royal Albert Hall, Kensington, London, England	
72	Loss	56–10–6	Jack Hyams	DQ	3 (8)	1 Sep 1941	Granby Halls, Leicester, Leicestershire, England	
71	Win	56–9–6	Tom Reddington	PTS	10	4 Aug 1941	Filbert Street Football Ground, Leicester, Leicestershire, England	
70	Win	55–9–6	Jack Powell	TKO	1 (10)	30 Jun 1941	Greyhound Stadium, Reading, Berkshire, England	
69	Win	54–9–6	Jack Hyams	TKO	4 (10)	8 Jun 1941	The Stadium, Liverpool, Merseyside, England	
68	Win	53–9–6	Trevor Burt	TKO	2 (10)	31 May 1941	Gess Pavilion, Pontypool, Wales	
67	Win	52–9–6	Arthur Sadd	TKO	9 (10)	26 May 1941	Granby Halls, Leicester, Leicestershire, England	
66	Win	51–9–6	Ernie Simmons	RTD	6 (10)	26 Dec 1940	New St James Hall, Newcastle, Tyne and Wear, England	
65	Win	50–9–6	Jock McAvoy	PTS	12	8 Aug 1940	The Stadium, Liverpool, Merseyside, England	
64	Win	49–9–6	Ben Valentine	TKO	3 (10)	22 May 1940	Winter Gardens, Bournemouth, Dorset, England	
63	Win	48–9–6	Stafford Barton	TKO	7 (10)	18 Apr 1940	Sports Centre, Walthamstow, London, England	
62	Win	47–9–6	Arthur Sadd	PTS	10	10 Apr 1940	Winter Gardens, Eastbourne, Sussex, England	
61	Win	46–9–6	Jim Berry	PTS	10	17 Mar 1940	Arena, Coventry, West Midlands, England	
60	Win	45–9–6	Elfryn Morris	KO	4 (10)	27 Dec 1939	Westover Ice Rink, Bournemouth, Dorset, England	
59	Draw	44–9–6	Eddie Maguire	PTS	10	27 Nov 1939	Sportsdrome, Southampton, Hampshire, England	
58	Win	44–9–5	Dave McCleave	KO	5 (10)	28 Oct 1939	Sportsdrome, Southampton, Hampshire, England	
57	Loss	43–9–5	Eddie Maguire	PTS	10	23 Oct 1939	Ice Rink, Nottingham, Nottinghamshire, England	
56	Win	43–8–5	Charlie Parkin	KO	1 (10)	21 Jul 1939	Millbay Rinkeries, Plymouth, Devon, England	
55	Loss	42–8–5	Arthur Sadd	PTS	10	14 Jun 1939	Winter Gardens, Bournemouth, Dorset, England	
54	Win	42–7–5	Dave McCleave	KO	1 (10)	3 May 1939	Westover Ice Rink, Bournemouth, Dorset, England	
53	Win	41–7–5	Charlie Parkin	PTS	10	26 Apr 1939	Westover Ice Rink, Bournemouth, Dorset, England	
52	Loss	40–7–5	Elfryn Morris	PTS	10	12 Apr 1939	Westover Ice Rink, Bournemouth, Dorset, England	
51	Draw	40–6–5	Nat Franks	PTS	12	13 Mar 1939	Millbay Rinkeries, Plymouth, Devon, England	
50	Win	40–6–4	Eddie Maguire	PTS	10	1 Mar 1939	Westover Ice Rink, Bournemouth, Dorset, England	
49	Loss	39–6–4	Ernie Butcher Gascoigne	PTS	12	20 Feb 1939	Hippodrome, Great Yarmouth, Norfolk, England	
48	Win	39–5–4	Johnny Blake	TKO	6 (12)	1 Feb 1939	Westover Ice Rink, Bournemouth, Dorset, England	
47	Win	38–5–4	Paul Schaeffer	PTS	10	18 Jan 1939	Westover Ice Rink, Bournemouth, Dorset, England	
46	Win	37–5–4	Yorkey Bentley	TKO	7 (12)	4 Jan 1939	Westover Ice Rink, Bournemouth, Dorset, England	
45	Loss	36–5–4	Dave McCleave	PTS	12	14 Dec 1938	Westover Ice Rink, Bournemouth, Dorset, England	
44	Win	36–4–4	Ernie Butcher Gascoigne	PTS	12	7 Dec 1938	Westover Ice Rink, Bournemouth, Dorset, England	
43	Win	35–4–4	Yorkey Bentley	KO	6 (12)	23 Nov 1938	Westover Ice Rink, Bournemouth, Dorset, England	
42	Win	34–4–4	Tom Curran	PTS	10	14 Nov 1938	Aquarium, Brighton, Sussex, England	
41	Win	33–4–4	Seaman Tommy Long	KO	3 (12)	9 Nov 1938	Westover Ice Rink, Bournemouth, Dorset, England	
40	Win	32–4–4	Fred Clements	TKO	6 (10)	27 Oct 1938	Connaught Drill Hall, Portsmouth, Hampshire, England	
39	Win	31–4–4	Moe Moss	KO	5 (10)	1 Aug 1938	Dean Court Football Ground, Bournemouth, Dorset, England	
38	Win	30–4–4	Charlie Parkin	PTS	12	27 Apr 1938	Westover Ice Rink, Bournemouth, Dorset, England	
37	Win	29–4–4	Charlie Parkin	TKO	3 (12)	13 Apr 1938	Westover Ice Rink, Bournemouth, Dorset, England	
36	Win	28–4–4	Jack Lewis	PTS	12	30 Mar 1938	Westover Ice Rink, Bournemouth, Dorset, England	
35	Win	27–4–4	Tommy Taylor	PTS	12	16 Mar 1938	Westover Ice Rink, Bournemouth, Dorset, England	
34	Win	26–4–4	Harry Vine	TKO	9 (12)	2 Mar 1938	Westover Ice Rink, Bournemouth, Dorset, England	
33	Win	25–4–4	Ted Barter	TKO	6 (12)	16 Feb 1938	Westover Ice Rink, Bournemouth, Dorset, England	
32	Win	24–4–4	Billy James	TKO	3 (12)	2 Feb 1938	Westover Ice Rink, Bournemouth, Dorset, England	
31	Win	23–4–4	Jim Greaves	PTS	12	19 Jan 1938	Westover Ice Rink, Bournemouth, Dorset, England	
30	Win	22–4–4	Ginger Dawkins	TKO	8 (12)	5 Jan 1938	Westover Ice Rink, Bournemouth, Dorset, England	
29	Draw	21–4–4	Ginger Dawkins	PTS	12	17 Dec 1937	Adelphi Gardens Pavilion, Paignton, Devon, England	
28	Loss	21–4–3	Jack Lewis	PTS	10	15 Dec 1937	Westover Ice Rink, Bournemouth, Dorset, England	
27	Win	21–3–3	Fred Clements	TKO	6 (12)	1 Dec 1937	Westover Ice Rink, Bournemouth, Dorset, England	
26	Draw	20–3–3	Jim Greaves	PTS	12	17 Nov 1937	Westover Ice Rink, Bournemouth, Dorset, England	
25	Win	20–3–2	Billy Fuller	KO	7 (12)	3 Nov 1937	Westover Ice Rink, Bournemouth, Dorset, England	
24	Loss	19–3–2	George Davis	PTS	12	20 Oct 1937	Westover Ice Rink, Bournemouth, Dorset, England	
23	Win	19–2–2	Harold Anthony	KO	1 (12)	8 Oct 1937	Adelphi Gardens Pavilion, Paignton, Devon, England	
22	Loss	18–2–2	George Davis	KO	10 (10)	14 Aug 1937	Poole Sports Arena, Poole, Dorset, England	
21	Win	18–1–2	Albert Johnson	PTS	12	5 May 1937	Westover Ice Rink, Bournemouth, Dorset, England	
20	Win	17–1–2	Harry Lister	PTS	12	28 Apr 1937	Westover Ice Rink, Bournemouth, Dorset, England	
19	Win	16–1–2	Jack Alder	PTS	12	14 Apr 1937	Westover Ice Rink, Bournemouth, Dorset, England	
18	Win	15–1–2	Jack McKnight	PTS	12	17 Mar 1937	Westover Ice Rink, Bournemouth, Dorset, England	
17	Win	14–1–2	Ernie Red Pullen	PTS	12	3 Mar 1937	Westover Ice Rink, Bournemouth, Dorset, England	
16	Win	13–1–2	Jack McKnight	PTS	12	17 Feb 1937	Westover Ice Rink, Bournemouth, Dorset, England	
15	Win	12–1–2	Harry Frolick	TKO	7 (10)	3 Feb 1937	Westover Ice Rink, Bournemouth, Dorset, England	
14	Win	11–1–2	Terry Warren	KO	2 (8)	20 Jan 1937	Westover Ice Rink, Bournemouth, Dorset, England	
13	Win	10–1–2	Billy Brown	KO	1 (10)	6 Jan 1937	Westover Ice Rink, Bournemouth, Dorset, England	
12	Win	9–1–2	Georges Bradby	KO	1 (10)	9 Dec 1936	Westover Ice Rink, Bournemouth, Dorset, England	
11	Win	8–1–2	Fred Linnington	KO	4 (8)	25 Nov 1936	Westover Ice Rink, Bournemouth, Dorset, England	
10	Win	7–1–2	Slogger Wilson	KO	7 (8)	11 Nov 1936	Westover Ice Rink, Bournemouth, Dorset, England	
9	Win	6–1–2	Stan Nelson	TKO	2 (6)	28 Oct 1936	Westover Ice Rink, Bournemouth, Dorset, England	
8	Win	5–1–2	Jack Scott	KO	1 (6)	14 Oct 1936	Westover Ice Rink, Bournemouth, Dorset, England	Mills had knocked out Scott earlier on this card, leaving the crowd dissatisfied. So, after a couple of other fights were concluded, they met again, with the same result
7	Win	4–1–2	Jack Scott	KO	1 (6)	14 Oct 1936	Westover Ice Rink, Bournemouth, Dorset, England	
6	Draw	3–1–2	George Hesketh	PTS	6	21 May 1936	Weymouth, Dorset, England	
5	Draw	3–1–1	Eddie Gill	PTS	6	20 Apr 1936	Westover Ice Rink, Bournemouth, Dorset, England	
4	Loss	3–1	Eddie Gill	KO	3 (8)	6 Apr 1936	Pannier Market, Barnstaple, Devon, England	
3	Win	3–0	Reg Davis	KO	4 (6)	25 Mar 1936	Westover Ice Rink, Bournemouth, Dorset, England	
2	Win	2–0	Young Barfoot	KO	2 (4)	11 Mar 1936	Westover Ice Rink, Bournemouth, Dorset, England	
1	Win	1–0	Jim Riley	KO	1 (3)	26 Feb 1936	Westover Ice Rink, Bournemouth, Dorset, England	

== Titles in boxing ==
=== Major world titles ===
- NBA (WBA) light heavyweight champion (175 lbs)

=== The Ring magazine titles ===
- The Ring light heavyweight champion (175 lbs)

=== Regional/International titles ===
- Commonwealth light heavyweight champion (175 lbs)
- British light heavyweight champion (175 lbs)
- European light heavyweight champion (175 lbs)

=== Undisputed titles ===
- Undisputed light heavyweight champion

== See also ==
- List of light heavyweight boxing champions
- List of British light-heavyweight boxing champions

== Sources ==
- Bavin, Bill (1975) The Strange Death of Freddie Mills, Howard Baker Press, ISBN 0-7030-0078-0

Achievements
Preceded by Gus Lesnevich	World Light Heavyweight Champion; 26 July 1948 – 24 January 1950	Succeeded by Joey Maxim
Light heavyweight status
Preceded by Gus Lesnevich	Latest born world champion to die 22 July 1965 – 15 December 1971	Succeeded by Dick Tiger
