= Jack Solomons =

British boxing promoter (1900–1979)

Jack Solomons (cropped)

Israel Jacob "Jack" Solomons OBE (10 December 1900 – 9 December 1979) was a British boxing promoter who has been called "one of the greatest boxing promoters in history" and "England's greatest boxing impresario".

Solomons was born in Petticoat Lane in the East End of London. He began promoting boxing in London during the 1930s. He took over operations at the Devonshire Club in Hackney, but that club was destroyed in the Blitz of 1940. Later, his base of operations was his gymnasium located at 41 Great Windmill Street in Soho.

His first great success came when he put together a match between Jack London and Bruce Woodcock for the British heavyweight title. He was involved in many major British boxing promotions involving Woodcock, Freddie Mills, and Randolph Turpin during those years. He promoted the bout between Turpin and Sugar Ray Robinson when Robinson lost his middleweight world title in 1951. He was particularly associated with promoting boxing matches at Harringay Arena in north London. In all, he promoted 26 world title fights. He also promoted Henry Cooper's 1963 bout with Muhammad Ali (but not their 1966 rematch). Solomons was appointed an Officer of the Order of the British Empire in the 1978 New Year Honours for charitable services.

Solomons died in Hove in 1979. He was inducted to the International Boxing Hall of Fame in 1995.
