= Joe Baksi =

American boxer

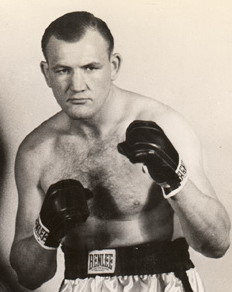
- Baski (circa 1950)

Personal information
- Nicknames: Kulpmont Coal Miner; Pennsylvania Coal Miner
- Nationality: American
- Born: Joseph William Baksi; January 14, 1922 Kulpmont, Pennsylvania
- Died: August 6, 1977 (aged 55) Albany, New York
- Weight: Heavyweight

Boxing career
- Stance: Orthodox

Boxing record
- Total fights: 72
- Wins: 60
- Win by KO: 29
- Losses: 9
- Draws: 3

Joseph William Baksi (January 14, 1922 – August 6, 1977) was an American professional boxer who held the IAC world (duration) heavyweight title in 1944, and top 10 ranking throughout the 1940s and early 1950s. Baksi possessed one of the best iron chins in his weight class. He was only knocked down once, against Bruce Woodcock in 1947. During his prime, the former coal miner defeated fighters such as Tami Mauriello, Lee Savold, Lou Nova, Freddie Mills, and Bruce Woodcock.

== Early life ==
Joe Baksi was a child of the Kulpmont, Pennsylvania, coal mines. His parents were Slovakians who emigrated from Austria-Hungary to Pennsylvania, where his father was a coal miner. He was quoted as saying that he never had any intention of being a boxer, but he saw it "as a ticket to a better way of life, out of the coal mines."

== Boxing career ==
=== Becoming a contender ===
Baksi broke into professional boxing in 1940 at the age of 18. He beat nine boxers that year, including the future movie actor Jack Palance (who fought under the name of Jack Brazzo) at the Westchester County Center in White Plains, New York.

Baksi campaigned over the boxing circuit for a number of years, until he got his first big match with Tami Mauriello on February 25, 1944 at Madison Square Garden. Mauriello was the 5-11 favorite, and the bronx contender for the Heavyweight crown. Mauriello was expected to win, based on his experience. Baski hoped to win by matching punch with punch and using his 210 vs. 196 lb weight advantage to his favor. Mauriello was floored late in the first round with a left hook by Baksi, and was down for a nine count. Mauriello faced a battering and battled back to prevent his first knockout defeat. Baksi won by unanimous decision.

Baksi's upset over Mauriello sprang him to nationwide prominence. He was the favorite to beat Lee Savold two weeks later at the Garden, having the weight advantage and coming off his victory over Mauriello (who had beaten Savold twice before). But Baksi was a tyro compared to Savold. Baksi got off to a slow start, and though he showed advantage in the ninth and tenth rounds Savold boxed his way with left hooks and jabs to win a split decision that night. They had a rematch on March 10, 1944. This time, Savold was the 5-7 favorite.

Baksi was in better shape that night, and fought a careful fight, out "left-handing" Savold, who was thought to have the best southpaw amongst the heavyweight contenders. At the finish Savold's left eye was cut, his nose and mouth bleeding, and his left side looked raw. Baksi's suffered a broken nose. He won a unanimous decision. His victory advanced him to be ranked 4th in the N.B.A rankings, behind champion Joe Louis, and boxers Billy Conn and Jimmy Bivins. Baksi went on to beat Savold again on August 7, 1944.

In his next fight, Baksi defeated Finnish boxer Gunnar Baerlund (GeeBee) and then scheduled a fight with his former sparring partner Lee Oma on January 28, 1945. Oma, unknown six months previously, gained fame by putting up a spirited fight against Mauriello in September. Oma lost that fight but earned a rematch in December, which he won. Still, Baksi was a 1-3 favorite to beat Oma. He had a 25-pound advantage over Oma, and corresponding advantages in height, reach, and punching power. But came in shaking off a cold and wasn't sharp. He made a late comeback in the fight, but lost by a unanimous decision.

Baksi went on to win a unanimous decision against Lou Nova on March 30, flooring Nova in the fourth round with a left hook to the ribs that kept Nova down for a count of nine. Baksi became the second ranked (wartime) heavyweight. He scored easy decisions against Lee Dixie Oliver and Larry Lane, and then fought a thirty-one-year-old Jersey Joe Walcott, six years shy of Walcott winning the combined heavyweight championship. Walcott had lost earlier bouts with world-class professionals, and was an underdog against Baksi. But Walcott won, scoring 6-3-1 on the single referee's scorecard. Walcott's dancing and dodging allowed him to escape Baksi's reach, and he was able to get in enough hooks to make Baksi groggy. Baksi lost his next fight with Jimmy Bell (a split decision in which Baksi was penalized two rounds for a low blow), but then racked up four easy wins before traveling to Europe.

External images
- Baksi in his prime
- Post Card
- Bow Tie Advert

=== Europe and back ===
Baksi left for Europe on October 9, 1946 to fight the two British champions. He first defeated British light heavy weight champion Freddie Mills. Baksi was sluggish in the first round, but Mills (who had chronic eye problems) suffered a cut in his right eye in the second round, and his left eye in the third. After a bad battering, Mills gave up at the end of the sixth round.

Baksi then went on to fight British heavyweight champion Bruce Woodcock on 15 April 1947. Baksi floored Woodcock three times in the first round and twice in the second. Woodcock made a comeback in the fifth, but Baksi was scoring at will when the referee stopped it in the seventh. Woodcock went to the hospital with a broken jaw.

After the contest, he travelled to Prague, Czechoslovakia, to meet relatives. Baksi, a former miner, then returned to Britain to do a promotional tour of coal mines accompanied by Fuel Minister Manny Shinwell. At Hickleton Main Colliery, Baksi was confronted by an angry juvenile, Brian Blessed, who was distraught that the American boxer had defeated his hero, Bruce Woodcock. He also visited Butlin's Holiday Camp at Filey to meet up with Woodcock who was staying there with his wife and they were pictured together. He traveled to Ireland to attend the European Amateur Boxing Championships in Dublin on 13 May. The following day, Baksi travelled on to the Abbey Cinema, Wexford as guest of honour at a 'Grand Boxing Tournament'. He presented the 'Baksi Cup' to Sean Mansfield, the boxer putting up 'the best performance of the evening'.

After defeating Woodcock, Baksi was scheduled to fight Joe Louis for the world heavyweight title. However, Baksi, still in Europe, signed a contract to fight the Swedish champion, Olle Tandberg in Stockholm. Baksi was the 1-5 favorite to beat Tandberg, and 1-3 favorite to knock him out by the seventh round. Baksi was going into the ring with 6 straight victories (five by knockout), while Tandberg had been fighting only since 1943, and only against local fighters. Then, in what the New York Times reported as the greatest upset in years, Baksi lost a split decision. Even Tandberg was surprised, saying after the fight "I didn't believe I had won the fight. I thought I was too much on the defensive in the closing rounds."

After his stunning defeat, Baksi took a year off. He was still the third ranked heavyweight contender, behind Jersey Joe Walcott and Ezzard Charles, and ahead of Lee Savold, when he scheduled a fight with Charles. The winner of that fight would have a title match with Joe Louis. Charles, the 5-14 favorite, defeated Baksi by TKO in the eleventh round.

=== Later career ===
After being beaten by Charles, his status as a contender faded. He went on to beat some obscure and aging boxers, then went into semi-retirement at age 29 in 1951. He made a comeback attempt in 1954, fighting Billy Smith, whom he knocked out in the first round. His second match was with a tougher opponent, Bob "The Grinder" Baker, who was the 7-5 favorite. Baksi had little left, and lost by unanimous decision. Baksi's manager, Leo Feureisen, collapsed during the fight and died in the dressing room a short while after.

Baksi retired for good after the bout. He then became a teamster, and later an ironworker and joined the International Brotherhood of Ironworkers.

== Death ==
Baksi died of a heart attack at Albany Medical Center in August 1977 aged 55.

== In popular culture ==
In the book Trainspotting by Irvine Welsh, several of the characters use the phrase Joe Baksi to refer to a taxi, an example of rhyming slang used frequently throughout the UK.

== Sources ==
- MAURIELLO CHOICE TO VANQUISH BAKSI; Bronx Heavyweight Rated 5-7 Edge in Ten-Round Bout at the Garden Tonight
- Baksi Outpoints Mauriello in 10-Round Upset Before 16,015 Fans at Garden; BRONX BOXER LOSES HEAVYWEIGHT BOUT Baksi Floors Mauriello for 9 in First and Carries On to Unanimous Decision BODY BLOWS WEAKEN TAMI Pennsylvanian Forces Action Throughout Spirited Fight
- BAKSI 1-2 CHOICE TO DEFEAT SAVOLD; Hard-Hitting Heavyweights to Meet in Ten-Rounder at the Garden Tonight
- Savold Beats Baksi in Heavyweight Bout Before 15,947 at Garden; DES MIOS BOXER GETS SPLIT VERDICT Savold Tags Onrushing Baksi With Left Hooks and Jabs to Win 10-Round Fight BOTH LAND HARD PUNCHES But No Knockdowns Result
- SAVOLD 5-7 CHOICE TO VANQUISH BAKSI; Heavyweights to Meet Over 12-Round Route in Return Garden Bout Tonight
- Baksi Decisively Outpoints Savold in 12-Round Heavyweight Bout at Garden; UNANIMOUS VERDICT FOR PENNSYLVANIAN Baksi's Sharp Left Helps Him Reverse Result of Previous Meeting With Savold
- BAKSI PLACED 4TH IN N.B.A. RANKINGS; Conqueror of Savold Is Rated Behind Louis, Conn, Bivins
- BAKSI BEATS SAVOLD ON POINTS IN CHICAGO
- OMA BEATS BAKSI IN BOXING UPSET; THE WINNER FORCING THE FIGHTING
- BAKSI BEATS NOVA WITH LATE RALLY; CALIFORNIA HEAVYWEIGHT ON THE FLOOR
- WALCOTT OUTBOXES BAKSI; Notches Upset in Heavyweight Bout in Camden Ring
- BAKSI STOPS MILLS AT END OF SIXTH; British Boxer Fails to Answer Bell for Seventh as Both Eyes Are Injured
- AMERICAN BATTERS BRITISH CHAMPION; Baksi Drops Woodcock 5 Times in First 2 Rounds -- London Bout Stopped in Seventh VICTOR IN LINE FOR LOUIS Pennsylvanian Qualifies for World Title Fight
- BAKSI TURNS DOWN MATCH WITH LOUIS; Walcott and Bettina Possible Rivals for Heavyweight Champion June 26
- BAKSI CHANGES HIS MIND; Now Says He Wants to Fight Louis in September
- BAKSI 1-5 FAVORITE IN STOCKHOLM BOUT; U.S. Boxer to Meet Tandberg Today -- Winner to Get Match With Louis
- DECISION AWARDED TO SWEDISH BOXER; Verdict for Tandberg Over Baksi Is Called 'Disgrace' by American's Manager SURPRISE TO THE VICTOR Didn't Think He Had Fought So Well -- Result Snarls Plans for Louis Title Bout
- Charles Stops Baksi in Eleventh to Become Leading Contender for Louis' Title; 11,194 SEE REFEREE HALT GARDEN FIGHT Baksi, Blinded by Systematic Beating, Is Stopped in 2:33 of Eleventh by Charles
- A Foe for Joe
- BAKER SETS BACK BAKSI ON POINTS; Loser's Manager Dies After Ringside Collapse
- Joe Baksi Dies at 55; Was a Top Heavyweight; Fought Charles, Walcott
