= Bruce Woodcock (boxer) =

British boxer

Personal information
- Nationality: British
- Born: 18 January 1920 Doncaster, West Riding of Yorkshire, England
- Died: 21 December 1997 (aged 77) Doncaster, England
- Height: 6 ft 0 1/2 in (184 cm)
- Weight: Heavyweight

Boxing career
- Reach: 72 1/2 in (184 cm)
- Stance: Orthodox

Boxing record
- Total fights: 39
- Wins: 35
- Win by KO: 31
- Losses: 4
Medal record
Men's amateur boxing
Representing England
English National Championships
Gold medal – first place	1939 London	Light-heavyweight

Bruce Woodcock (18 January 1920 – 21 December 1997) was an English professional boxer who held the Great Britain, British Empire and European heavyweight titles from 1945 to 1950. He fought unsuccessfully for the BBBofC/EBU versions of the World Heavyweight Championship in 1950. In 2017, Woodcock (1942–1950) was ranked No. 9 on the Top 10 Greatest British Heavyweights of All Time.

Bruce Woodcock used his initials (B.W.) to add "Best Wishes" to autographs for fans. At 6 ft tall and weighing 190 lbs, his physique was shredded like a modern bodybuilder (David Laid). Woodcock was known as a skilled and aggressive boxer with an overhand right knockout punch. He finished with a record of 35 wins (31 KOs/88.57%) and 4 losses.

== Biography ==
=== Early life and amateur career ===
Born in Doncaster, West Riding of Yorkshire, in 1920 and brought up in Balby, Woodcock took up boxing at the age of six, and was a schoolboy champion at the age of 12. He went on to work as a railway fitter in the L.N.E.R. loco sheds, joining the attached amateur boxing club.

He was trained during his early years by his father, a former British Army lightweight champion. In 1938–39, he won the Northern Counties light heavyweight championship, qualifying for the ABA finals at the Royal Albert Hall in 1939, which he also won, beating A. Ford in the final. He represented England at the 1939 European Amateur Boxing Championships in Dublin, losing to Franciszek Szymura of Poland in the semi-final, and to Lajos Szigeti of Hungary in the third place bout.

=== Professional career ===
His railway job being deemed necessary war work, he was not called up during the Second World War, but in the early 1940s was redeployed to Manchester, where he worked as a maintenance engineer in a shell-making plant at Dukinfield. While in Manchester he met Tom Hurst, who became his manager, and he turned professional. He began his professional career in January 1942 with a third-round knockout of Fred Clarke, winning all of his first 20 bouts, 19 by stoppage, including a third-round knockout of Jack Robinson to take the BBBofC Northern Area cruiserweight title in September 1942 and a win over Canadian champion Al Delaney in October 1944. He held the Northern Area title until relinquishing in October 1944.

In July 1945, at White Hart Lane, Tottenham, Woodcock defeated the champion Jack London to take the British and Empire heavyweight tiles. Woodcock won by a knockout in round six after having London down three times in that round.

In September 1945, Woodcock was ranked third in the world by The Ring magazine, behind Tami Mauriello and Jimmy Bivins.

Woodcock won his next four bouts, including a win over Irish champion Martin Thornton, before suffering his first loss, by TKO at the hands of the vastly more experienced Mauriello at Madison Square Garden in May 1946. He bounced back from this by defeating Freddie Mills on points in June, before winning the European title by knocking out Paul Albert Renet in the sixth round in July. Woodcock went on to win his next three fights, stopping Gus Lesnevich in September, before rounding out the year by knocking out French champion Georges Martin in November and stopping Nils Andersson in December.

In March 1947, he successfully defended his European title against Stephane Olek, but a month later suffered his second loss, against Joe Baksi at the Harringay Arena in a fight billed as a final eliminator for the World title. He was floored three times in the first round and twice in the second and yet tried to come back before the referee stopped it in the seventh. He was later found to have suffered a broken jaw during the first round of the fight, requiring a stay of almost two weeks in hospital. Later in the year he spent several weeks in Leeds Infirmary being treated for an eye injury initially claimed to have been sustained while working in a quarry, although a hospital report later confirmed that the injury was a detached retina sustained in the Baksi fight, and he did not return to the ring until September 1948.

In 1949, Bruce was contracted under businessman Leslie T. Salts to train at Gwrych Castle, Abergele. Whilst there, he would attract over 200,000 fans on the site to a sparring in one weekend of May, 1950.

Again, Woodcock bounced back in impressive fashion, scoring wins over Lee Oma and Lee Savold, followed by a third-round knockout of Johnny Ralph in March 1949 to win the British Empire Title (now known as Commonwealth Title) in South Africa.

On 2 June 1949, Woodcock again beat Freddie Mills, retaining the British, European and Empire heavyweight titles by a KO in round 14, in front of 50,000 people at the White City Stadium.

Woodcock was due to meet Lee Savold for the British version of the World Heavyweight Championship (vacant due to the retirement of Joe Louis) in September 1949, but in August suffered head and shoulder injuries, and a concussion after crashing his lorry. The fight was initially rescheduled for May 1950, and as part of his training, Woodcock offered £100 to any sparring partner who could knock him down and £5 to anyone who could stay on their feet for a round in training. Woodcock and Savold eventually met on 6 June 1950 at White City before over 50,000 spectators. This was done under the auspices of the British Boxing Board of Control and EBU, and recognized throughout Europe and the Commonwealth, but not in the USA. In the event, a 15-round contest, Woodcock's left eye sustained a bad cut, and his nose and mouth were bleeding profusely. The fight was stopped in the fourth round. A record 30 million peopled listened on BBC Radio.

On 14 November 1950, Woodcock lost his British and Empire Titles to Jack Gardner by an 11th-round TKO at Earl's Court. The following day he announced his retirement from boxing to avoid further damage to his eyes. In 1951, his autobiography, Two Fists and a Fortune, was published. Woodcock planned to return to boxing, but in March 1952 was refused a licence by the British Boxing Board of Control.

=== Personal life and retirement ===
In December 1946, he married Nora Speight (born 14 July 1922, Doncaster - died 2 July 2008), with whom he had one son, Bruce, and one daughter, Janet. Bruce's brother, Billy, was also a boxer. Woodcock became the licensee of the Angel Hotel in Bolsover in May 1952.

He went on to become a boxing manager, looking after local fighters such as Peter Aldridge and Peter Bates. He later ran the Tumbler Pub in Edlington. Woodcock died on 21 December 1997, aged 77.

In 1971 actor Brian Blessed attempted to make a film about his hero Bruce Woodcock. He enlisted the help of fellow Z-Cars colleagues David Rose and Alan Plater but could not progress to production due to Woodcock's reluctance to be featured.

In 2013, a biography of Woodcock by Bryan Hughes, Battling Bruce: The Story of the Fighting Career and Rise to Fame of Bruce Woodcock, was published, with the author also starting a campaign for a statue of Woodcock to be erected.

== Professional boxing record ==
39 fights	35 wins	4 losses
By knockout	31	4
By decision	3	0
By disqualification	1	0

No.	Result	Record	Opponent	Type	Round, time	Date	Location	Notes
39	Loss	35–4	(United Kingdom) Jack Gardner	RTD	11 (15)	14 Nov 1950	(United Kingdom) Earls Court Arena, London, England	Lost British and Commonwealth heavyweight titles
38	Loss	35–3	(United States) Lee Savold	RTD	4 (15)	6 Jun 1950	(United Kingdom) White City Stadium, London, England	For vacant World heavyweight title recognized by the British Boxing Board of Control
37	Win	35–2	(United Kingdom) Freddie Mills	KO	14 (15)	2 Jun 1949	(United Kingdom) White City Stadium, London, England	Retained British, Commonwealth and European heavyweight titles
36	Win	34–2	(South Africa) Johnny Ralph	KO	3 (15)	26 Mar 1949	Wembley Stadium, Johannesburg, South Africa	Retained Commonwealth heavyweight title
35	Win	33–2	(United States) Lee Savold	DQ	4 (10), 1:40	6 Dec 1948	(United Kingdom) Harringay Arena, London, England	
34	Win	32–2	(United States) Lee Oma	KO	4 (10), 2:05	21 Sep 1948	(United Kingdom) Harringay Arena, London, England	
33	Loss	31–2	(United States) Joe Baksi	TKO	7 (10)	15 Apr 1947	(United Kingdom) Harringay Arena, London, England	
32	Win	31–1	(France) Stephane Olek	PTS	15	17 Mar 1947	(United Kingdom) King's Hall, Manchester, England	Retained European heavyweight title
31	Win	30–1	(Sweden) Nils Andersson	KO	3 (10), 3:00	17 Dec 1946	(United Kingdom) Harringay Arena, London, England	
30	Win	29–1	(France) Georges Martin	KO	3 (10)	14 Nov 1946	(United Kingdom) King's Hall, Manchester, England	
29	Win	28–1	(United States) Gus Lesnevich	KO	8 (10), 1:40	17 Sep 1946	(United Kingdom) Harringay Arena, London, England	
28	Win	27–1	(France) Albert Renet	KO	6 (15)	29 Jul 1946	(United Kingdom) King's Hall, Manchester, England	Won vacant European heavyweight title
27	Win	26–1	(United Kingdom) Freddie Mills	PTS	12	4 Jun 1946	(United Kingdom) Harringay Arena, London, England	
26	Loss	25–1	(United States) Tami Mauriello	KO	5 (10), 2:16	17 May 1946	(United States) Madison Square Garden, New York City, New York, U.S.	
25	Win	25–0	(United Kingdom) Bert Gilroy	TKO	2 (10)	8 Apr 1946	(United Kingdom) King's Hall, Manchester, England	
24	Win	24–0	(United Kingdom) George James	TKO	3 (10)	29 Mar 1946	(United Kingdom) Skating Rink, Kingston upon Hull, England	
23	Win	23–0	(United Kingdom) Jock Porter	TKO	3 (10), 1:10	27 Nov 1945	(United Kingdom) Royal Albert Hall, London, England	
22	Win	22–0	(Republic of Ireland) Mairtin Thornton	RTD	3 (10)	24 Aug 1945	(Republic of Ireland) Theatre Royal, Dublin, Ireland	
21	Win	21–0	(United Kingdom) Jack London	TKO	6 (15)	17 Jul 1945	(United Kingdom) White Hart Lane, London, England	Won British and Commonwealth heavyweight titles
20	Win	20–0	(Canada) Cal Rooney	TKO	3 (8)	2 May 1945	(United Kingdom) Queensberry Club, London, England	
19	Win	19–0	(Canada) Al Delaney	KO	5 (8), 1:50	9 Oct 1944	(United Kingdom) Circus Street Hall, Nottingham, England	
18	Win	18–0	(United Kingdom) George Marwick	TKO	3 (8)	15 Sep 1944	(United Kingdom) King's Hall, Manchester, England	
17	Win	17–0	(United Kingdom) Joe Quigley	TKO	2 (8)	7 Aug 1944	(United Kingdom) City Ground, Nottingham, England	
16	Win	16–0	(United Kingdom) Bert Gilroy	KO	6 (8)	19 Jun 1944	(United Kingdom) Granby Halls, Leicester, England	
15	Win	15–0	(United Kingdom) Ken Shaw	TKO	5 (8)	13 Mar 1944	(United Kingdom) De Montfort Hall, Leicester, England	
14	Win	14–0	(United Kingdom) Tom Reddington	KO	5 (8)	4 Feb 1944	(United Kingdom) King's Hall, Manchester, England	
13	Win	13–0	(United Kingdom) Glen Moody	TKO	6 (8)	27 Dec 1943	(United Kingdom) Circus Street Hall, Nottingham, England	
12	Win	12–0	(Republic of Ireland) Mairtin Thornton	TKO	2 (8)	19 Nov 1943	(United Kingdom) King's Hall, Manchester, England	
11	Win	11–0	(United Kingdom) Glen Moody	TKO	6 (8)	18 Jun 1943	(United Kingdom) King's Hall, Manchester, England	
10	Win	10–0	(New Zealand) George Muir	TKO	4 (8)	19 May 1943	(United Kingdom) Queensberry Club, London, England	
9	Win	9–0	(Canada) Arnold Hayes	TKO	3 (10)	2 Apr 1943	(United Kingdom) King's Hall, Manchester, England	
8	Win	8–0	(United Kingdom) George Hinchcliffe	TKO	7 (8)	29 Oct 1942	(United Kingdom) Heckmondwike, England	
7	Win	7–0	(United Kingdom) Jack Robinson	KO	3 (12)	25 Sep 1942	(United Kingdom) King's Hall, Manchester, England	Won Northern Area light-heavyweight title
6	Win	6–0	(United Kingdom) George Davis	TKO	2 (8)	7 Aug 1942	(United Kingdom) King's Hall, Manchester, England	
5	Win	5–0	(United Kingdom) Don Burton	TKO	2 (6)	30 Jun 1942	(United Kingdom) Olympia Skating Rink, Oldham, England	
4	Win	4–0	(United Kingdom) Len Munden	TKO	2 (6)	20 Jun 1942	(United Kingdom) White Hart Lane, London, England	
3	Win	3–0	(United Kingdom) Tommy Morgan	TKO	3 (6)	21 Apr 1942	(United Kingdom) Watford Town Hall, Watford, London	
2	Win	2–0	(United Kingdom) Charlie Bundy	PTS	6	23 Feb 1942	(United Kingdom) Royal Albert Hall, London, England	
1	Win	1–0	(United Kingdom) Stoker Fred Clark	TKO	3 (6)	26 Jan 1942	(United Kingdom) Royal Albert Hall, London, England	

== See also ==
- List of British heavyweight boxing champions

== Sources ==
- Wharton, Ronnie (2005), Fighting Men of the North, Tempus Publishing Limited, ISBN 0-7524-3551-5
