= Jimmy Bivins =

American boxer (1919–2012)

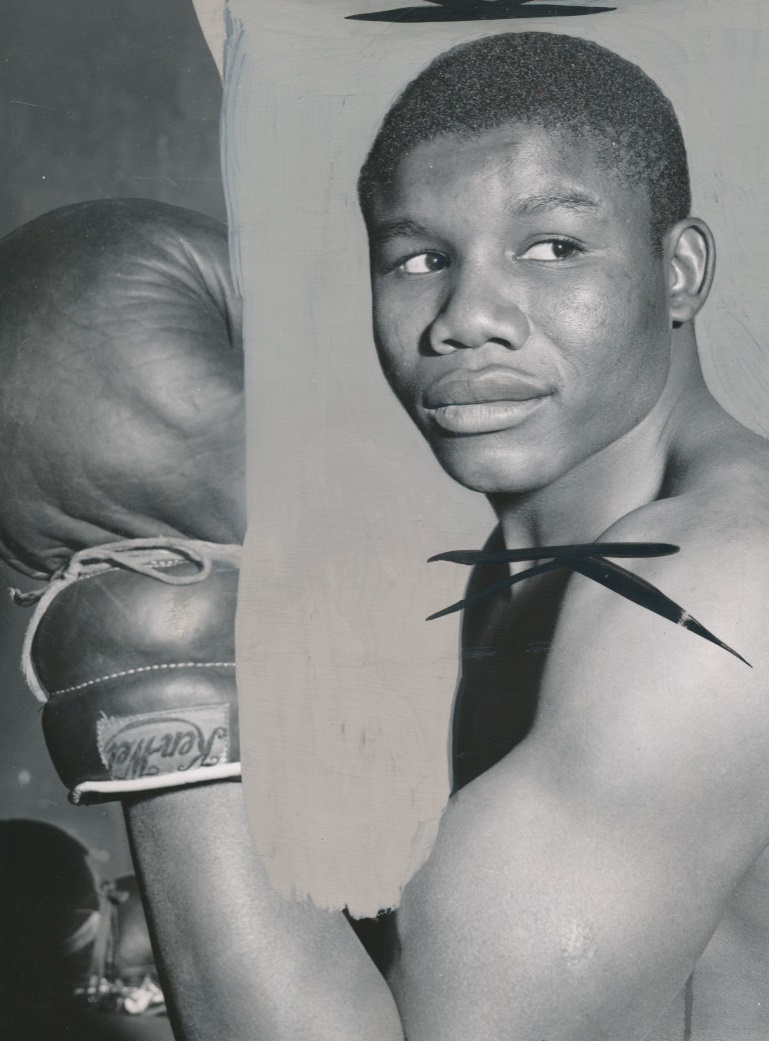
- Bivins in 1942

Personal information
- Born: James Louis Bivins; December 6, 1919 Dry Branch, Georgia, U.S.
- Died: July 4, 2012 (aged 92) Cleveland, Ohio, U.S.
- Weight: Light Heavyweight; Heavyweight

Boxing career
- Stance: Orthodox

Boxing record
- Total fights: 112
- Wins: 86
- Win by KO: 31
- Losses: 26
- Draws: 1

James Louis Bivins (December 6, 1919 – July 4, 2012) was an American boxer whose professional career ran from 1940 to 1955. He was born in Dry Branch, Georgia. Although he was never given the opportunity to fight for a world title, despite at one point being the number one contender in both the light heavyweight and heavyweight divisions, Bivins fought and defeated many of the great fighters of his era and won the "Duration" Light Heavyweight and Heavyweight titles. In recognition of his achievements in the ring - among other things, he defeated eight of the eleven world champions he faced - Bivins was inducted into the International Boxing Hall of Fame in 1999. He was also the one-time husband of Dollree Mapp, the subject of prominent Supreme Court case regarding the rights of search and seizures.

== Boxing career ==
Although he was born in Georgia, Bivins fought out of Cleveland, Ohio for the entirety of his career. He made his professional debut on January 15, 1940, winning by knockout in the first round, and went on to win his first nineteen fights, all fought in 1940, before losing a split decision to Anton Christoforidis, whom he had previously beaten. Bivins won his first four fights of 1941, including contests with Teddy Yarosz and Curtis Sheppard, but lost three of his other four contests that year, which included a points loss to Melio Bettina. He began 1942 with wins against Billy Soose and Gus Lesnevich and a split-decision loss to Bob Pastor. After this loss, Bivins had a twenty-seven fight undefeated streak that lasted for four years; it was during this period that Bivins established himself as one of the great heavyweights of his era - a remarkable achievement given that, at 5' 9", he was often significantly smaller than his opponents.

Bivins first fight after losing to Pastor was a split-decision win against Joey Maxim, a fellow Cleveland fighter who went on to become a member of the hall of fame. Bivins fought four more contests in 1942, including a rematch with Bob Pastor and a bout with Lee Savold, and won them all. He began 1943 with a remarkable win against Ezzard Charles, in which he recorded seven knockdowns against the future heavyweight world champion. On February 23, 1943 he defeated Anton Christoforidis on points for the duration light heavyweight title - as all the world titles had been frozen for the duration of World War II, this was the closest he ever came to holding a world title. In the three years after this fight Bivins went on to defeat Tami Mauriello, Pat Valentino, Lloyd Marshall, Melio Bettina, Curtis Sheppard and Archie Moore, whom he knocked-down six times en route to a knockout victory. Bivins served with the United States Army from March, 1944 until his honorable discharge in November of the same year - during 1944 he fought only one professional fight, a points victory over Lee Q. Murray.

On February 25, 1946 Bivins fought Jersey Joe Walcott at the Cleveland Arena. The fight was Bivins' first loss in four years, the split decision was interesting in that one official had the fight 6-4 to Bivins, the second had it 9-1 to Walcott and the last had it 5-4-1 to Bivins but gave the fight to Walcott because of a third round knockdown in his favour. After losing his long unbeaten streak, Bivins' record as a fighter became somewhat average. After his loss to Walcott, Bivins went on to lose his next two contests, against Lee Q. Murray and Ezzard Charles, before winning the following four. Bivins suffered a knockout loss to Ezzard Charles on March 10, 1947 and went on to lose a further two of his final seven fights that year, to Lee Q. Murray and Archie Moore. He went on to win six of his nine fights in 1948, losing only to Joey Maxim, Ezzard Charles and Archie Moore. In 1949 he won five of his eight fights, but lost to both Archie Moore and Harold Johnson. He only fought twice in 1950, but returned to fighting regularly the following year. In 1951 he defeated Ted Lowry on points, but was once again knocked-out by Archie Moore and lost by unanimous decision to both Joe Louis and the undefeated Bob Baker. Bivins had a further eleven fights after his loss to Baker, and won eight of them. His only big-name opponent during these final fights was Ezzard Charles, who won by decision on November 26, 1952. Bivins retired following a victory over the journeyman Chubby Wright in June 1953, but returned for two final fights, both of which he won, a couple of years later.

== Retirement and later life ==
Following his retirement, Bivins earned a living as a bakery truck driver. In his spare time, he coached young people in boxing. Bivins' first two marriages ended in divorce. His third wife, Elizabeth, died in 1995. In April 1998, Bivins was discovered living in the unheated attic of his daughter and son in law's home in Collinwood, wrapped in a urine and feces caked blanket. The former boxer's weight had dwindled to 110 pounds. Bivins was then moved into his sister's home in Shaker Heights. In 2009, Bivins was moved into MacGregor Home, a care facility for the elderly. He died in 2012 at the age of 92 in Cleveland, Ohio.

== Awards and honors ==
- Entered into Greater Cleveland Sports Hall of Fame in 1978
- Entered into The Canadian Boxing Hall of Fame in 1988
- Entered into The World Boxing Hall of Fame in 1994
- Entered into The International Boxing Hall of Fame (class of 1999)
- Jimmy Bivins Park dedicated in Cleveland (2000)
- Entered into The California Boxing Hall of Fame 2015

== Professional boxing record ==
112 fights	86 wins	25 losses
By knockout	31	5
By decision	55	20
Draws	1	

No.	Result	Record	Opponent	Type	Round	Date	Location	Notes
112	Win	86–25–1	Mike DeJohn	PTS	6	Oct 28, 1953	Arena, Cleveland, Ohio, U.S.	
111	Win	85–25–1	Dan Moray	RTD	3 (8)	Aug 31, 1953	Arena, Cleveland, Ohio, U.S.	
110	Win	84–25–1	Chubby Wright	PTS	10	Jun 9, 1953	Huntington, West Virginia, U.S.	
109	Win	83–25–1	Claude Rolfe	UD	10	Apr 24, 1953	Latin-American Arena, Tampa, Florida, U.S.	
108	Loss	82–25–1	Tommy Harrison	UD	10	Apr 6, 1953	Dinner Key Auditorium, Coconut Grove, Florida, U.S.	
107	Loss	82–24–1	Ezzard Charles	UD	10	Nov 26, 1952	Chicago Stadium, Chicago, Illinois, U.S.	
106	Loss	82–23–1	Tommy Harrison	UD	10	Nov 3, 1952	Rhode Island Auditorium, Providence, Rhode Island, U.S.	
105	Win	82–22–1	Wes Bascom	MD	10	Oct 22, 1952	Arena, Saint Louis, Missouri, U.S.	
104	Win	81–22–1	Coley Wallace	KO	9 (10)	Sep 19, 1952	St. Nicholas Arena, New York City, New York, U.S.	
103	Win	80–22–1	Aaron Wilson	TKO	3 (10)	Mar 31, 1952	Rhode Island Auditorium, Providence, Rhode Island, U.S.	
102	Win	79–22–1	Charley Williams	SD	10	Nov 21, 1951	St. Nicholas Arena, New York City, New York, U.S.	
101	Loss	78–22–1	Bob Baker	UD	10	Nov 5, 1951	Duquesne Gardens, Pittsburgh, Pennsylvania, U.S.	
100	Loss	78–21–1	Joe Louis	UD	10	Aug 15, 1951	Memorial Stadium, Baltimore, Maryland, U.S.	
99	Loss	78–20–1	Clarence Henry	UD	10	Jun 26, 1951	Olympic Auditorium, Los Angeles, California, U.S.	
98	Win	78–19–1	Willie Bean	UD	10	May 29, 1951	Olympic Auditorium, Los Angeles, California, U.S.	
97	Win	77–19–1	Ralph Hooker	PTS	10	May 18, 1951	Madison Square Garden, Phoenix, Arizona, U.S.	
96	Win	76–19–1	Willie Bean	UD	10	May 4, 1951	Legion Stadium, Hollywood, California, U.S.	
95	Loss	75–19–1	Archie Moore	RTD	9 (10)	Feb 21, 1951	St. Nicholas Arena, New York City, New York, U.S.	
94	Win	75–18–1	Ted Lowry	UD	10	Feb 12, 1951	Coliseum, Baltimore, Maryland, U.S.	
93	Win	74–18–1	Young Harry Wills	KO	4 (10)	Jan 22, 1951	Coliseum, Baltimore, Maryland, U.S.	
92	Loss	73–18–1	Sid Peaks	PTS	10	Feb 6, 1950	Laurel Garden, Newark, New Jersey, U.S.	
91	Win	73–17–1	Willis Applegate	UD	10	Feb 1, 1950	Miami Stadium, Miami, Florida, U.S.	
90	Loss	72–17–1	Harold Johnson	UD	10	Oct 26, 1949	Convention Hall, Philadelphia, Pennsylvania, U.S.	
89	Win	72–16–1	Clarence Henry	TKO	8 (10)	Sep 27, 1949	Olympic Auditorium, Los Angeles, California, U.S.	
88	Win	71–16–1	Leonard Morrow	UD	10	Sep 21, 1949	Auditorium, Oakland, California, U.S.	
87	Win	70–16–1	Watson Jones	KO	2 (10)	Jul 15, 1949	Last Frontier Sportsdrome, Las Vegas, Nevada, U.S.	
86	Loss	69–16–1	Leonard Morrow	UD	10	Jul 5, 1949	Olympic Auditorium, Los Angeles, California, U.S.	
85	Win	69–15–1	Willie Bean	UD	10	Jun 20, 1949	Arena, Cleveland, Ohio, U.S.	
84	Loss	68–15–1	Archie Moore	KO	8 (10)	Apr 11, 1949	Sports Arena, Toledo, Ohio, U.S.	
83	Win	68–14–1	Rusty Payne	SD	10	Mar 21, 1949	Aragon Gardens, Pittsburgh, Pennsylvania, U.S.	
82	Loss	67–14–1	Joey Maxim	SD	10	Dec 7, 1948	Arena, Cleveland, Ohio, U.S.	
81	Win	67–13–1	Johnny Flynn	MD	10	Oct 11, 1948	Arena, Philadelphia, Pennsylvania, U.S.	
80	Loss	66–13–1	Ezzard Charles	UD	10	Sep 13, 1948	Griffith Stadium, Washington, D.C., U.S.	
79	Loss	66–12–1	Archie Moore	MD	10	Jun 28, 1948	Coliseum, Baltimore, Maryland, U.S.	
78	Win	66–11–1	Pat Valentino	UD	10	Apr 20, 1948	Arena, Cleveland, Ohio, U.S.	
77	Win	65–11–1	Billy Thompson	TKO	7 (10)	Apr 12, 1948	Arena, Philadelphia, Pennsylvania, U.S.	
76	Win	64–11–1	Turkey Thompson	UD	10	Mar 9, 1948	Olympic Auditorium, Los Angeles, California, U.S.	
75	Win	63–11–1	Johnny Haynes	TKO	4 (10)	Mar 1, 1948	Coliseum, Baltimore, Maryland, U.S.	
74	Win	62–11–1	Johnny Shkor	UD	10	Jan 13, 1948	Memorial Auditorium, Buffalo, New York, U.S.	
73	Win	61–11–1	Sid Peaks	PTS	10	Nov 12, 1947	Chicago Stadium, Chicago, Illinois, U.S.	
72	Loss	60–11–1	Archie Moore	RTD	8 (10)	Sep 8, 1947	5th Regiment Armory, Baltimore, Maryland, U.S.	
71	Win	60–10–1	Bobby Zander	SD	10	Jul 1, 1947	Olympic Auditorium, Los Angeles, California, U.S.	
70	Win	59–10–1	Lee Q Murray	SD	10	Jun 9, 1947	Coliseum, Baltimore, Maryland, U.S.	
69	Win	58–10–1	Omelio Agramonte	TKO	2 (10)	Jun 2, 1947	Coliseum, Baltimore, Maryland, U.S.	
68	Loss	57–10–1	Lee Q Murray	UD	10	May 9, 1947	Olympia Stadium, Detroit, Michigan, U.S.	
67	Win	57–9–1	Curtis Sheppard	UD	10	Apr 21, 1947	Coliseum, Baltimore, Maryland, U.S.	
66	Loss	56–9–1	Ezzard Charles	KO	4 (10)	Mar 10, 1947	Arena, Cleveland, Ohio, U.S.	
65	Win	56–8–1	Curtis Sheppard	UD	10	Feb 17, 1947	Arena, Philadelphia, Pennsylvania, U.S.	
64	Win	55–8–1	Booker Beckwith	KO	4 (10)	Feb 3, 1947	Coliseum, Chicago, Illinois, U.S.	
63	Win	54–8–1	Johnny Flynn	UD	10	Jan 16, 1947	Uline Arena, Washington, D.C., U.S.	
62	Win	53–8–1	Colion Chaney	KO	5 (10)	Dec 5, 1946	Armory, Akron, Ohio, U.S.	
61	Loss	52–8–1	Ezzard Charles	UD	10	Nov 12, 1946	Duquesne Gardens, Pittsburgh, Pennsylvania, U.S.	
60	Loss	52–7–1	Lee Q Murray	UD	10	Jun 10, 1946	Arena, Cleveland, Ohio, U.S.	
59	Loss	52–6–1	Jersey Joe Walcott	SD	10	Feb 25, 1946	Arena, Cleveland, Ohio, U.S.	
58	Win	52–5–1	Yancey Henry	KO	10 (10)	Feb 11, 1946	Coliseum, Baltimore, Maryland, U.S.	
57	Win	51–5–1	Oakland Billy Smith	PTS	10	Jan 30, 1946	Auditorium, Oakland, California, U.S.	
56	Win	50–5–1	Johnny Haynes	KO	2 (10)	Jan 22, 1946	Olympic Auditorium, Los Angeles, California, U.S.	
55	Win	49–5–1	Watson Jones	TKO	6 (10)	Jan 7, 1946	Civic Auditorium, San Francisco, California, U.S.	
54	Win	48–5–1	Yancey Henry	UD	10	Sep 26, 1945	Uline Arena, Washington, D.C., U.S.	
53	Win	47–5–1	Archie Moore	KO	6 (10)	Aug 22, 1945	Lakefront Stadium, Cleveland, Ohio, U.S.	
52	Win	46–5–1	Curtis Sheppard	UD	10	Jul 26, 1945	Forbes Field, Pittsburgh, Pennsylvania, U.S.	
51	Win	45–5–1	Russell Scott	KO	4 (10)	Jun 12, 1945	Griffith Stadium, Washington, D.C., U.S.	
50	Draw	44–5–1	Melio Bettina	PTS	10	Mar 16, 1945	Madison Square Garden, New York City, New York, U.S.	
49	Win	44–5	Johnny Flynn	PTS	10	Feb 27, 1945	Arena, Cleveland, Ohio, U.S.	
48	Win	43–5	Buddy Walker	KO	2 (10)	Feb 19, 1945	Coliseum, Baltimore, Maryland, U.S.	
47	Win	42–5	George Parks	TKO	4 (10)	Feb 5, 1945	Uline Arena, Washington, D.C., U.S.	
46	Win	41–5	Lee Q Murray	PTS	10	Feb 29, 1944	Arena, Cleveland, Ohio, U.S.	
45	Win	40–5	Lee Q Murray	UD	10	Dec 1, 1943	Arena, Cleveland, Ohio, U.S.	
44	Win	39–5	Melio Bettina	UD	10	Sep 15, 1943	Lakefront Stadium, Cleveland, Ohio, U.S.	
43	Win	38–5	Herbert Marshall	KO	6 (10)	Aug 24, 1943	Griffith Stadium, Washington, D.C., U.S.	
42	Win	37–5	Lloyd Marshall	KO	13 (15)	Jun 8, 1943	Lakefront Stadium, Cleveland, Ohio, U.S.	Retained duration light heavyweight title
41	Win	36–5	Pat Valentino	UD	10	Apr 26, 1943	Civic Auditorium, San Francisco, California, U.S.	
40	Win	35–5	Watson Jones	UD	10	Apr 6, 1943	Olympic Auditorium, Los Angeles, California, U.S.	
39	Win	34–5	Tami Mauriello	MD	10	Mar 12, 1943	Madison Square Garden, New York City, New York, U.S.	
38	Win	33–5	Anton Christoforidis	UD	15	Feb 23, 1943	Arena, Cleveland, Ohio, U.S.	Won vacant duration light heavyweight title
37	Win	32–5	Ezzard Charles	UD	10	Jan 7, 1943	Arena, Cleveland, Ohio, U.S.	
36	Win	31–5	Lee Savold	UD	10	Nov 27, 1942	Madison Square Garden, New York City, New York, U.S.	
35	Win	30–5	Bob Pastor	SD	10	Oct 20, 1942	Arena, Cleveland, Ohio, U.S.	
34	Win	29–5	Tami Mauriello	SD	10	Sep 15, 1942	Arena, Cleveland, Ohio, U.S.	Won vacant duration heavyweight title
33	Win	28–5	Joe Muscato	KO	5 (10)	Jul 23, 1942	Arena, Cleveland, Ohio, U.S.	
32	Win	27–5	Joey Maxim	SD	10	Jun 23, 1942	Lakefront Stadium, Cleveland, Ohio, U.S.	
31	Loss	26–5	Bob Pastor	SD	10	Apr 17, 1942	Arena, Cleveland, Ohio, U.S.	
30	Win	26–4	Gus Lesnevich	UD	10	Mar 11, 1942	Arena, Cleveland, Ohio, U.S.	
29	Win	25–4	Billy Soose	UD	10	Jan 13, 1942	Arena, Cleveland, Ohio, U.S.	
28	Loss	24–4	Melio Bettina	UD	10	Nov 17, 1941	Arena, Cleveland, Ohio, U.S.	
27	Win	24–3	Nate Bolden	UD	10	Oct 20, 1941	Marigold Gardens, Chicago, U.S.	
26	Loss	23–3	Tony Musto	SD	10	Sep 10, 1941	Arena, Cleveland, Ohio, U.S.	
25	Loss	23–2	Lem Franklin	TKO	9 (10)	Jul 14, 1941	Marigold Gardens Outdoor Arena, Chicago, Illinois, U.S.	
24	Win	23–1	Curtis Sheppard	PTS	10	Jul 2, 1941	Hickey Park, Millvale, Pennsylvania, U.S.	
23	Win	22–1	Buddy Knox	PTS	10	Apr 2, 1941	Public Hall, Cleveland, Ohio, U.S.	
22	Win	21–1	Teddy Yarosz	PTS	10	Mar 5, 1941	Arena, Cleveland, Ohio, U.S.	
21	Win	20–1	Pete Tamalonis	TKO	1 (10)	Feb 19, 1941	Public Hall, Cleveland, Ohio, U.S.	
20	Loss	19–1	Anton Christoforidis	MD	10	Dec 2, 1940	Arena, Cleveland, Ohio, U.S.	
19	Win	19–0	Anton Christoforidis	UD	10	Nov 15, 1940	Public Hall, Cleveland, Ohio, U.S.	
18	Win	18–0	Vince Pimpinella	UD	10	Oct 22, 1940	Arena, Cleveland, Ohio, U.S.	
17	Win	17–0	Larry Kellum	KO	1 (10)	Sep 23, 1940	Hickey Park, Millvale, Pennsylvania, U.S.	
16	Win	16–0	Johnny Barbara	TKO	7 (8)	Sep 9, 1940	Marigold Gardens Outdoor Arena, Chicago, Illinois, U.S.	
15	Win	15–0	Charley Burley	UD	10	Sep 3, 1940	Hickey Park, Millvale, Pennsylvania, U.S.	
14	Win	14–0	Johnny Barbara	KO	2 (10)	Aug 5, 1940	Marigold Gardens Outdoor Arena, Chicago, Illinois, U.S.	
13	Win	13–0	Paul Frazier	PTS	8	Jul 15, 1940	Marigold Gardens Outdoor Arena, Chicago, Illinois, U.S.	
12	Win	12–0	Mose Brown	PTS	6	Jul 1, 1940	Hickey Park, Millvale, Pennsylvania, U.S.	
11	Win	11–0	Frankie Hughes	PTS	8	Jun 24, 1940	Marigold Gardens Outdoor Arena, Chicago, Illinois, U.S.	
10	Win	10–0	Stoney Jackson	TKO	1 (6)	Jun 13, 1940	Hickey Park, Millvale, Pennsylvania, U.S.	
9	Win	9–0	Paul Frazier	KO	1 (8)	May 13, 1940	Marigold Gardens, Chicago, Illinois, U.S.	
8	Win	8–0	Enzo Iannozzi	KO	1 (8)	Apr 25, 1940	Public Hall, Cleveland, Ohio, U.S.	
7	Win	7–0	Marine Johnny Dean	KO	3 (6)	Apr 15, 1940	Public Hall, Cleveland, Ohio, U.S.	
6	Win	6–0	Nate Bolden	PTS	8	Apr 8, 1940	Marigold Gardens, Chicago, Illinois, U.S.	
5	Win	5–0	Young Flowers	TKO	3 (4)	Mar 27, 1940	Public Hall, Cleveland, Ohio, U.S.	
4	Win	4–0	Joe Sutka	PTS	8	Mar 18, 1940	Marigold Gardens, Chicago, Illinois, U.S.	
3	Win	3–0	Joe Sutka	PTS	8	Feb 26, 1940	Marigold Gardens, Chicago, Illinois, U.S.	
2	Win	2–0	Tito Taylor	PTS	4	Feb 12, 1940	Marigold Gardens, Chicago, Illinois, U.S.	
1	Win	1–0	Emory Morgan	TKO	2 (4)	Jan 15, 1940	Public Hall, Cleveland, Ohio, U.S.	
