= Curtis Sheppard =

Curtis Sheppard (born James Roberts; c. 1919 – c. 1989) was an American professional boxer. Born in Jacksonville, FL, he fought professionally out of Pittsburgh, PA. Standing approximately 5 feet 11 inches tall, Sheppard competed in the light heavyweight and heavyweight divisions. He was famously known as “the Hatchet Man,” due to his legendary punching power and strong chin. Over the course of 88 professional bouts, he compiled a record of 52 wins (34 by knockout and 18 decision victories), 33 losses (28 by decision and 5 by knockout), 1 newspaper decision win, and 2 no contests.

Hall of Fame boxer Archie Moore stated that Curtis Sheppard was the hardest puncher he ever fought, a notable claim given Moore’s heavy-hitting opposition over his career, which included Rocky Marciano, Floyd Patterson, Niño Valdés, and Bob Satterfield. Moore said that getting hit by Sheppard felt like an electric shock, and that Sheppard once missed a punch at a man’s jaw and ended up breaking his collarbone instead. Sheppard’s greatest victory came when he knocked out future World Light Heavyweight Champion and Hall of Fame boxer Joey Maxim in the first round.

== Life ==
Sheppard was from Pittsburgh, Pennsylvania. Sheppard was a popular fighter during the 1930s and 1940s. His nickname was "The Hatchetman."

== Boxing career ==
Sheppard began his career on September 24, 1938, knocking out Larry White in the first round at Madison Square Garden. His first defeat was on November 1 of that year, against Danny Peal, by decision. Sheppard would win four fights in a row, including one against Herbie Katz, who had an immediate rematch, with Sheppard's winning streak stopped at four, when Katz beat him by decision.

In his next fight, November 18, 1939, Sheppard met the future world Heavyweight champion Jersey Joe Walcott. Sheppard lost that fight by an eight-round decision.

After another win and a loss, he met Tony Musto, another fighter of the era who is remembered for fighting many name boxers. Musto beat Sheppard by a ten-round decision, on July 1, 1940.

Sheppard won three and had one no contest in his next four bouts, including a win over Lee Q. Murray. His no-contest bout was against Elza Thompson, on April 17 of 1941, in Pittsburgh. But then he lost again, by decision to Willie Reddish, eleven days after his fight with Thompson.

In June of that year, he beat Q. Murray; then, on August 2, he lost by decision to future Hall of Famer Jimmy Bivins. Sheppard won five of his next seven fights, until on July 27, 1942, he lost to future world Light Heavyweight champion Joey Maxim, by a ten-round decision. He won two of his next four fights. The two fights he did not win during that span included another no-contest, this time against Hubert Hood, in six rounds.

Maxim was the world's #1 challenger in the Light Heavyweight division at the time, and he only needed one more win to earn a world title shot. Because of this, Maxim's management, thinking that Sheppard would be an easy opponent, scheduled a match between Sheppard and Maxim.

Sheppard temporarily spoiled Maxim's plans, knocking him out in round one of their rematch, on March 10. This result, which would be the only knockout loss in Maxim's career, was a surprise to Ring Magazine writers and many boxing fans. Needing to restore his image in order to fight for the world Light Heavyweight title, Maxim signed for an immediate rematch with Sheppard, which would be the third fight between the two boxers. Maxim prevailed this time around, by a ten-round decision.

While Maxim went on and became world champion, Sheppard continued to fight anyone, anytime. Only twenty-six days later, he went into the ring with a fighter who was 12-0 before their fight: Sheppard defeated Clint Conway by a ten-round decision on April 26.

Sheppard won only two of his next five fights, before embarking on a seven-fight win streak. The first three wins were first-round knockouts, including one over Conway, on December 12, 1943. On January 24, 1944, he had one of his best performances when he beat future challenger for the world heavyweight championship Gus Dorazio by a ten-round unanimous decision.

Sheppard's win streak was stopped by Buddy Walker, who defeated Sheppard on February 6, by a ten-round decision.

Sheppard's next fourteen fights were almost all against the elite of the Light Heavyweight division: He beat Buddy Walker by a knockout in eight rounds in a rematch. Then he beat Tony Shucco by knockout in five, before losing to Q. Murray and to future world champion Melio Bettina, both by ten-round decisions. Then he beat Alf Brown, Dan Merritt, and Buddy Walker, all except Walker by decision. Walker was knocked out in nine rounds. Then Sheppard was knocked out in seven rounds by Perk Daniels on April 9, 1945. This was followed by a points loss at the hands of Jimmy Bivins. Sheppard then recorded consecutive victories over Nate Bolden, Johnny Allen, and Perkins in a rematch, before once again facing Jersey Joe Walcott, followed by a bout with Archie Moore. Against Walcott, Sheppard knocked him down in the fourth round. However, Walcott controlled the remainder of the fight, ultimately flooring Sheppard with a right hand to the midsection in the tenth round.

Sheppard would fight twenty three more times, winning fourteen and losing nine. He lost another fight to Moore, but "the king of knockouts" could never knock Sheppard out, as he had to settle for a second decision victory over Sheppard. Sheppard also lost to Bivins, Q. Murray and to Rusty Payne, each of them twice by decision, during that last 23-fight stretch. His second fight with Payne, on January 19, 1949, was his last professional boxing fight.

Sheppard compiled a record of 52 wins and 33 losses, with 2 no-contests, and 34 knockouts.
