= Bob Pastor =

American boxer (1914-1996)

- Born: Robert E. Pasternak; January 26, 1914; New York, New York, U.S.
- Died: January 26, 1996 (aged 82) n/a
- Education: n/a
- Occupations: Boxer, world title challenger

Bob Pastor (January 26, 1914 – January 26, 1996) born Robert E. Pasternak, was a prominent American boxer. He was a top-ranked heavyweight of the 1940s who once challenged for the world title, losing to Joe Louis in 1939.

== Professional boxing career ==
Pastor began his professional boxing career on January 26, 1935, his 21st birthday. In his professional debut he fought Julius Veight, a veteran who had a considerable experience advantage over the rookie boxer, with a record of 10 wins and 20 losses. The fight was held at Ridgewood Grove, Brooklyn, New York, and ended with Pastor outscoring Veight to win a six round points decision.

The fight with Veight was the beginning of an eight fight winning streak that saw Pastor score his first stoppage, a fourth round knockout of another veteran, the 11-29-10 Frank LoBianco, at the Dyckman Oval, in New York City on June 12, 1935. Pastor fought at Yankee Stadium on September 24 of that year, outpointing the 21-20-2 Terry Mitchell over four rounds. On November 1, in a fight featuring two undefeated prospects, Pastor, by then 7-0 with 1 knockout win, faced Max Marek, who had a record of 5-0 with 2 knockouts. This bout marked Pastor's first fight as a professional boxer at the Madison Square Garden. Pastor improved to 8-0 by outpointing Marek over 6 rounds. 28 days later, Pastor received the first blemish on his record, a six round draw against Eddie Sims, who had a record of 23-15-1 coming into their bout.

The fight with Sims was followed by an encounter with ranked contender Steve Dudas, who had a record of 36-7. The fight occurred on January 17, 1936, at the Madison Square Garden. Dudas won the fight by an eight round decision, handing Pastor his first professional defeat. A draw against the 31-5-2 Al Delaney came after that, and then a rematch with Dudas in which Pastor avenged his earlier defeat by outpointing Dudas over 6 rounds on March 13 at the Madison Square Garden.

Pastor's next fight was highly unusual in that his opponent, the 11-12-1 Art Sykes, suffered a nervous breakdown before their bout. Sykes returned to his hotel and had to be persuaded to return to the arena for the fight. Sykes became disinterested in fighting and leapt out of the ring in round six, quitting and officially giving Pastor his second knockout win.

A win over Terry Mitchell in a rematch came after the fight with Sykes, followed by wins against Frankie Sims and a victory over Ralph Barbara in a bout fought at St. Nicholas Arena in New York. These wins were followed by a rubber-match victory by six round decision over Dudas, on June 19, 1936, at Yankee Stadium.

Pastor then took on the 31-15-14 John Andersson, on July 7, 1936. This fight was significant in that it marked the first time Pastor boxed outside New York state as a professional. The bout was held at the Braddock Bowl, Jersey City, New Jersey, and Pastor came out on top with a fourth round technical knockout.

On August 1, 1936, Pastor fought a boxer named Unknown Winston, at the Walnut Beach Stadium in Milford, Connecticut. The October, 1936 issue of Ring Magazine stated that Winston had fought Lou Poster on the day of the fight, not Bob Pastor, and that the fight had been held on August 12 instead first. The magazine later corrected that information in its next issue, clarifying that it was Pastor, not Poster, who faced Winston and that the fight had been held on August 1. Pastor won the fight by a ten round decision.

Pastor followed the victory over Winston with a win over Billy Ketchell, and three wins over mediocre opposition, whose combined records totaled 20 wins, 36 losses and 6 draws, before facing Ray Impelletiere. Impelletiere had an unimpressive record of 10-6, but held the USA New York State's Heavyweight title. Pastor won the regional belt when he dropped Impelletiere twice before stopping him in round seven, on December 18, 1936 at the Madison Square Garden. With that, Pastor was set to face upcoming star Joe Louis, who had a record of 29-1 at the time.

== First fight with Joe Louis ==
Joe Louis was rapidly becoming known as a serious contender with a powerful punch when he and Pastor faced each other January 29, 1937. He had scored 25 knockout wins in 30 fights, his lone defeat so far coming in his first fight with former world heavyweight champion Max Schmeling.

The first encounter between Pastor and Louis was held at the Madison Square Garden with Arthur Donovan Sr. as referee. Despite taking a beating, Pastor was not floored by the young contender and he lasted the ten round distance, losing by unanimous decision.

After that fight, Pastor made his West Coast debut on May 28 when he met the undefeated 12-0 Bob Nestell at the Wrigley Field in Los Angeles, California. Nestell dropped Pastor in round one, and Pastor dropped him in rounds one and three en route to a 10 round points win for Pastor. In his next fight, Pastor lost to the 28-4-3 Nathan Mann by unanimous 10 round decision at the Madison Square Garden, on November 26, 1937.

After a relatively restful 1937, Pastor began 1938 with four fights in less than thirty days, beating Hans Havlicek by technical knockout in 8 on January 17, Buck Tracy by technical knockout in 2 on the 24th, Buck Everett on points in 10 on January 31, and then ranked contender Al Ettore by 10 round unanimous decision on February 7.

Pastor then faced Lou Nova on April 22, in San Francisco, California. Nova entered the fight with an undefeated record of 16-0-3, and emerged with his undefeated streak still intact after the two men fought to a ten round draw. On May 10, back in Los Angeles, Pastor made his Olympic Auditorium debut, defeating contender Lee Ramage by a ninth round technical knockout when Ramage's manager Pop Foster threw in the towel, signifying their surrender.

Pastor knocked out the 24-6-1 Chuck Crowell in the first round and then faced Al McCoy, a hard-punching fighter who had once been recognized as world Light-Heavyweight champion by the Montreal Athletic Commission. Pastor outpointed McCoy over ten rounds on June 20, 1938 and ten days later, he outpointed Freddie Fiducia. On August 5, Pastor fought former world Light-Heavyweight champion Maxie Rosenbloom, whose career was drawing to a close. Rosenbloom and Pastor fought to a ten round draw at Los Angeles' Gilmore Stadium, in Rosenbloom's second to last fight. After wins over Big Bob Brackey and Mickey Duggan, Pastor fought with the 36-4 contender Gus Dorazio, at the Arena in Philadelphia, Pennsylvania, on December 12, losing by a split decision. One judge scored the fight 5-4-1 in rounds for Dorazio, another scored it for Pastor by the same margin, and the third and deciding judge scored it 4-4-2, but had Dorazio ahead on points using a supplemental scoring system.

== Rematch with Louis for world Heavyweight title ==
Pastor built a six fight winning streak after losing to Dorazio. Every victory during that streak was on points over ten rounds, including a rematch with McCoy, a fight against Maurice Strickland in which Pastor's trunks fell to the floor at least twice during round six, and a rematch with Freddie Fiducia.

Louis had already established himself as a dominant world heavyweight champion by the time he faced Pastor for the second time, having won the title from James J. Braddock and successfully defended it with a fifteen round unanimous decision over Tommy Farr, and knockouts of Nathan Mann in the third, Harry Thomas in the fifth, Max Schmeling (in a rematch), John Henry Lewis and Jack Roper (the latter three in the first round) and Tony Galento in the fourth.

32,199 paying ticket holders and a further 1,669 non-paying spectators got to see the fight live, at Detroit's Briggs Stadium on September 20, 1939. Once again, Pastor gave Louis a hard fight, but he was dropped four times in round one and once in the second round before succumbing to the champion via a knockout 38 seconds into the eleventh round.

Pastor returned to the boxing ring on December 15 of that year to face the 42-5-2 Buddy Scott at Dallas, Texas, winning the fight by a ten round decision. He then took six months off before returning on June 28, 1940 to fight the 20-12-5 Charlie Eagle at the Broadway Auditorium in Buffalo, New York, outpointing him, over ten rounds.

== Match with Billy Conn ==
Billy Conn was the National Boxing Association and New York State Athletic Commission's world light heavyweight champion when Pastor faced him on September 6, 1940, in a highly anticipated bout fought at the Madison Square Garden. Pastor was knocked down by Conn, who was making an attempt at obtaining a shot at Louis for the world heavyweight title, as the bell ended round nine, once again in round twelve and was finally counted out by referee Bill Cavanaugh after receiving a left hook to the body in the thirteenth round.

A sixth round technical knockout over mediocre 8-15-2 Mike Alfano was followed by a points victory in ten rounds over the 25-2 Turkey Thompson. On June 16, 1941, Pastor fought a rematch against Buddy Scott, where an audience of only 2,500 paying customers witnessed Pastor once again outpoint Scott over ten rounds at Griffith Stadium, Washington, D.C. Pastor then returned to Los Angeles for a rematch with Turkey Thompson, again prevailing on points with referee and sole judge Abe Roth scoring the bout 7-2-1 in rounds for Pastor.

October 28, 1941, marked the first time Pastor boxed abroad as a professional, facing old rival Al Delaney, whom Pastor had tied with in his eleventh fight as a professional boxer, at the Maple Leaf Gardens in Toronto, Ontario, Canada. This time, he dropped Delaney five times before scoring a sixth round technical knockout.

On November 7 of that year, he met the 16-0 undefeated prospect Booker Beckwith. Pastor almost scored a knockout victory when he dropped Beckwith for a nine-second count in round six, but Beckwith got up and finished the bout on his feet. Pastor nevertheless scored a ten round unanimous decision win. Pastor's next bout was on December 12, against the 31-13-1 Jim Robinson, at the Mechanics Building in Boston. In this fight, Pastor dropped his opponent four times to score a first round knockout. Robinson was a late substitute for Jack Marshall, whose military obligations did not let him face Pastor that night.

On January 30, 1942, Pastor faced world Light-Heavyweight champion Gus Lesnevich, who like Conn, was recognized as light heavyweight champion by the National Boxing Association and the New York State Athletic Commission, and who was also trying his luck as a heavyweight. Pastor defeated Lesnevich over ten rounds by unanimous decision, at the Madison Square Garden. Lesnevich would later gain universal recognition as world Light-heavyweight champion by knocking out British boxer Freddie Mills. A knockout in eight rounds against the 29-5-1 Lem Franklin at the Arena, in Cleveland, Ohio, set Pastor up for a fight with Jimmy Bivins on April 17, also at the Arena in Cleveland. Despite being dropped twice in round one, Pastor recovered and won the fight by a ten round split decision. Then, on May 22, Pastor faced Tami Mauriello, drawing with Mauriello over ten rounds in front of a crowd of 12,000 at the Madison Square Garden. On September 25 he defeated Buddy Scott for a third time, by points after ten rounds, at the Olympia Stadium in Detroit.

== Last fight ==
Pastor's next fight turned out to be his last. On October 20, he faced Jimmy Bivins at the Arena in Cleveland for a second time. This time Pastor lost by split decision, retiring shortly afterwards.

Pastor compiled a record of 53 wins, 7 losses and 5 draws, with 17 wins coming by way of knockouts. He achieved this record in only 7 years of fighting as a professional boxer, a relatively short amount of time in which to accumulate 65 professional bouts.

== Wrong Pastor ==
During a visit to Arizona in 1992 as part of the 1992 United States Presidential campaign, Henry Cisneros, a confessed boxing fan, mistakenly introduced Ed Pastor as "Bob" to a donation-dinner crowd. This was a highly publicized mistake on Cisneros' part.
