= Anton Christoforidis =

Greek boxer (1917–1985)

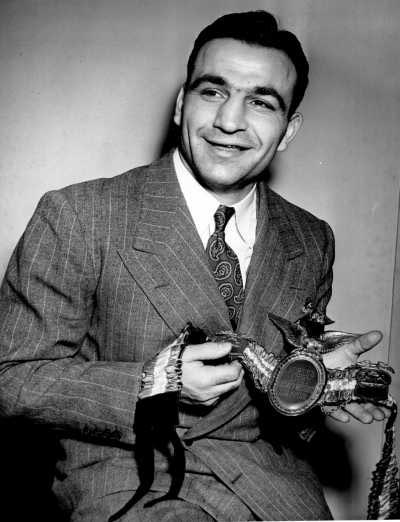
- Christoforidis with the NBA Light Heavyweight Championship

Personal information
- Nationality: Greek
- Born: Antonios Christoforidis; 26 May 1917 Mersin, Ottoman Empire
- Died: 19 October 1985 (aged 68) Athens, Greece
- Height: 5 ft 8 in (1.73 m)
- Weight: Light heavyweight

Boxing career
- Reach: 72 in (183 cm)

Boxing record
- Total fights: 76
- Wins: 53
- Win by KO: 13
- Losses: 15
- Draws: 8

Anton Christoforidis (Greek: Αντώνιος Χριστοφορίδης; 26 May 1917 – 19 October 1985) was a Greek professional light heavyweight boxer. He won the NBA Light Heavyweight Championship in 1941, making him the first Greek to become a world boxing champion.

== Early life ==
Christoforidis was born in Mersin, Ottoman Empire, but lived his first years in Smyrna. In 1922, he came to Athens, Greece as a refugee with his mother and his two sisters. His father and seven other relatives were killed in Asia Minor. His mother died two years after the family came to Athens. He had a very poor childhood, and was working in a hotel when he realized that he was a very strong boy and didn't mind fighting. He started boxing lessons and soon became the Athens champion, although he was only 16 years old. Then he decided to go to Paris where he grew up very soon in the boxing arenas.

Since Christoforidis did not possess heavy hands, having only recorded thirteen knockouts in seventy-six fights (fifty-three wins), he relied on ring savvy and work-rate in his boxing endeavors.

Christoforidis and Joey Maxim were sparring partners.

== Professional career ==
Anton Christoforidis against Bep van Klaveren

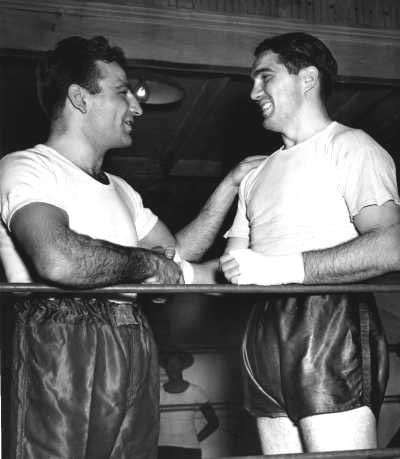
Anton Christoforidis and Joey Maxim.

Christoforidis had most of his early fights in Europe, particularly in France. From 1934 to late 1939, he had 46 fights in Europe, and then went to the United States. His first bout was against Theodore Korenyi in Athens, Greece, which he won by second-round knockout. His last fight in Europe prior to his departure for America was a points win over the legendary Canadian welterweight/middleweight Lou Brouillard in April 1939.

On 8 November 1937, Christoforidis won both the Greek middleweight and Greek light heavyweight titles from Costas Vassis in Athens, Greece.

Christofordis defeated EBU (European) middleweight champion Bep van Klaveren on 14 November 1938 in Rotterdam, Netherlands and won the EBU title. One of the spectators was Adolf Hitler.

His first title defense was against France's Edouard Tenet in Paris, France. Anton was ahead on points going into the eleventh round, but broke his left hand that round and was forced to finish the fight on the defensive. He lost via decision.

He made his United States debut on 5 January 1940 in Madison Square Garden, defeating Willie Pavlovich by decision. At that point, Christoforidis settled in Geneva, Ohio. Anton next built up an eight fight winning streak, which was stopped when future Hall of Famer Jimmy Bivins bested him over 10 rounds. Anton once said, "I won that fight; it was strictly a hometown decision." In a rematch the next month, Christoforidis returned the favor and won a 10-round decision, handing Bivins the first defeat of his career.

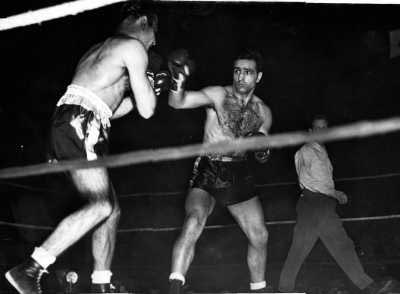
Christoforidis fighting Melio Bettina for the NBA Light Heavyweight Championship.

The Bivins victory and successful results he had against other American opponents earned Christoforidis a bout with Melio Bettina for the vacant National Boxing Association world light heavyweight title. He won the light heavyweight crown on 13 January 1941 in Cleveland, Ohio, by defeating Melio Bettina in a unanimous decision of a fifteen-round bout. Bettina was winning slightly after twelve rounds, but Christofordis finished strong in the final three to win a decision popular with the spectators. The world light heavyweight title was recently stripped from Billy Conn, who failed to defend the belt in six months due to moving up in weight to challenge heavyweight champion Joe Louis.

After knockout wins over Italo Colonello and Johnny 'Bandit' Romero in non-title bouts, Christofordis lost to Gus Lesnevich by unanimous decision on 22 May 1941. Although this was not an NBA title fight, Lesnevich was later awarded the title by the NBA regardless on 24 May 1941.

On 12 January 1942, Christofordis suffered his first knockout loss at the hands of rising contender and future light heavyweight legend Ezzard Charles in Cincinnati, Ohio. Christoforidis was down for "six" and "nine" before the fight was stopped.

Christoforidis fought his last bout on 18 February 1947 against Anton Raadik. He retired with a record of 53 wins (13 by knockout), 15 losses and 8 draws.

== Retirement, death and legacy ==
Christoforidis ran a bar-restaurant in Geneva, Ohio, for several years after retiring from boxing in 1947. He was also fond of the Cleveland area.

In 1961, Christoforidis and his wife got divorced, and in 1968 he sold his interests in Geneva and moved to Florida to retire. In 1971, for the first time he took an extended trip back to Greece for an intended 45 days, but enjoyed it so much, he stayed for 15 years. Christoforidis was treated as a hero in Greece and enjoyed associating the rich and famous on the golf courses and, as he said, "being in shirt sleeves 12 months a year."

Christoforidis died suddenly of a heart attack while being in his car, on 19 October 1985 in Athens, Greece at the age of 67. He has made history by becoming the first Greek professional boxing world champion.

== Professional boxing record ==
76 fights	53 wins	15 losses
By knockout	13	3
By decision	39	12
By disqualification	1	0
Draws	8	

No.	Result	Record	Opponent	Type	Round,time	Date	Age	Location	Notes
76	Loss	53–15–8	Anton Raadik	RTD	7 (10)	Feb 18, 1947	29 years, 268 days	Olympia Stadium, Detroit, Michigan, U.S.	
75	Loss	53–14–8	Steve Belloise	TKO	10 (10), 2:15	Nov 22, 1946	29 years, 180 days	Olympia Stadium, Detroit, Michigan, U.S.	
74	Win	53–13–8	Augie Fleischauer	TKO	7 (10), 0:54	Aug 19, 1946	29 years, 85 days	Lakefront Stadium, Cleveland, Ohio, U.S.	
73	Win	52–13–8	Butch Lynch	KO	3 (10), 0:49	Jul 8, 1946	29 years, 43 days	Lakefront Stadium, Cleveland, Ohio, U.S.	
72	Loss	51–13–8	Lloyd Marshall	UD	10	Apr 21, 1943	25 years, 330 days	Arena, Cleveland, Ohio, U.S.	
71	Loss	51–12–8	Jimmy Bivins	UD	15	Feb 23, 1943	25 years, 273 days	Arena, Cleveland, Ohio, U.S.	For vacant "duration" light heavyweight title
70	Win	51–11–8	Nate Bolden	UD	10	Dec 22, 1942	25 years, 210 days	Arena, Cleveland, Ohio, U.S.	
69	Draw	50–11–8	Nate Bolden	PTS	10	Aug 10, 1942	25 years, 76 days	Marigold Gardens Outdoor Arena, Chicago, Illinois, U.S.	
68	Win	50–11–7	Mose Brown	PTS	10	Jul 27, 1942	25 years, 62 days	Forbes Field, Pittsburgh, Pennsylvania, U.S.	
67	Win	49–11–7	Johnny Colan	PTS	10	Jun 23, 1942	25 years, 28 days	Lakefront Stadium, Cleveland, Ohio, U.S.	
66	Win	48–11–7	Johnny Colan	PTS	10	May 20, 1942	24 years, 359 days	Chicago Stadium, Chicago, Illinois, U.S.	
65	Win	47–11–7	Paulie Mahoney	KO	9 (10)	Apr 29, 1942	24 years, 338 days	Memorial Auditorium, Buffalo, New York, U.S.	
64	Win	46–11–7	Jimmy Reeves	PTS	10	Apr 17, 1942	24 years, 326 days	Arena, Cleveland, Ohio, U.S.	
63	Loss	45–11–7	Ezzard Charles	TKO	3 (10), 2:42	Jan 12, 1942	24 years, 231 days	Music Hall Arena, Cincinnati, Ohio, U.S.	
62	Win	45–10–7	George Burnette	PTS	10	Jan 2, 1942	24 years, 221 days	Fairgrounds Coliseum, Detroit, Michigan, U.S.	
61	Win	44–10–7	Ceferino Garcia	PTS	10	Dec 1, 1941	24 years, 189 days	Arena, Cleveland, Ohio, U.S.	
60	Loss	43–10–7	Gus Lesnevich	UD	15	May 22, 1941	23 years, 361 days	Madison Square Garden, New York City, New York, U.S.	Lost NBA light heavyweight title; Not an NBA Title fight but Lesnevich awarded the title by the NBA on May 24, 1941
59	Win	43–9–7	Johnny "Bandit" Romero	KO	2 (10), 2:31	Apr 30, 1941	23 years, 339 days	Municipal Auditorium, Saint Louis, Missouri, U.S.	
58	Win	42–9–7	Italo Colonello	TKO	5 (10)	Apr 7, 1941	23 years, 316 days	Coliseum, Baltimore, Maryland, U.S.	
57	Win	41–9–7	Melio Bettina	UD	15	Jan 13, 1941	23 years, 232 days	Arena, Cleveland, Ohio, U.S.	Won vacant NBA light heavyweight title
56	Win	40–9–7	Jimmy Bivins	MD	10	Dec 2, 1940	23 years, 190 days	Arena, Cleveland, Ohio, U.S.	
55	Loss	39–9–7	Jimmy Bivins	UD	10	Nov 15, 1940	23 years, 173 days	Public Hall, Cleveland, Ohio, U.S.	
54	Win	39–8–7	Jimmy Reeves	KO	2 (10), 2:44	Oct 22, 1940	23 years, 149 days	Arena, Cleveland, Ohio, U.S.	
53	Win	38–8–7	Tony Bruno	PTS	10	Aug 21, 1940	23 years, 87 days	Mills Stadium, Chicago, Illinois, U.S.	
52	Win	37–8–7	Joe Sutka	PTS	10	Jul 9, 1940	23 years, 44 days	Arena Gardens, Detroit, Michigan, U.S.	
51	Win	36–8–7	Jimmy Burns	TKO	6 (10)	Jun 5, 1940	23 years, 10 days	Coliseum, Chicago, Illinois, U.S.	
50	Win	35–8–7	George Burnette	PTS	8	Apr 5, 1940	22 years, 315 days	Olympia Stadium, Detroit, Michigan, U.S.	
49	Win	34–8–7	Frank Zamaris	PTS	6	Mar 29, 1940	22 years, 308 days	Madison Square Garden, New York City, New York, U.S.	
48	Win	33–8–7	Willie Pavlovich	PTS	8	Jan 5, 1940	22 years, 224 days	Madison Square Garden, New York City, New York, U.S.	
47	Win	32–8–7	Lou Brouillard	PTS	10	Apr 5, 1939	21 years, 314 days	Palais des Sports, Paris, France	
46	Loss	31–8–7	Edouard Tenet	PTS	15	Jan 14, 1939	21 years, 233 days	Palais des Sports, Paris, France	Lost IBU middleweight title
45	Win	31–7–7	Bep van Klaveren	PTS	15	Nov 14, 1938	21 years, 172 days	De Doelen, Rotterdam, Netherlands	Won IBU middleweight title
44	Loss	30–7–7	Bep van Klaveren	PTS	10	May 23, 1938	20 years, 362 days	Nenijtohal, Rotterdam, Netherlands	
43	Draw	30–6–7	Gustav Eder	PTS	12	May 6, 1938	20 years, 345 days	Sportpalast, Schoeneberg, Nazi Germany	
42	Win	30–6–6	Gustav Eder	PTS	12	Jan 14, 1938	20 years, 233 days	Sportpalast, Schoeneberg, Nazi Germany	
41	Win	29–6–6	Costas Vassis	PTS	15	Nov 8, 1937	20 years, 166 days	Athens, Greece	Won Greek light heavyweight title; Won Greek middleweight title
40	Win	28–6–6	Mielu Doculescu	KO	1 (10)	Oct 30, 1937	20 years, 157 days	Athens, Greece	
39	Draw	27–6–6	José Martínez Valero	PTS	10	Aug 22, 1937	20 years, 88 days	Oran, French Algeria	
38	Win	27–6–5	Victor Janas	PTS	10	Aug 8, 1937	20 years, 74 days	Stade Communal de Saint Eugène, Algiers, French Algeria	
37	Loss	26–6–5	Kid Tunero	PTS	10	Jun 13, 1937	20 years, 18 days	Chantilly, France	
36	Draw	26–5–5	José Martínez Valero	PTS	10	Apr 3, 1937	19 years, 312 days	Palais des Sports, Paris, France	
35	Draw	26–5–4	José Martínez Valero	PTS	10	Mar 1, 1937	19 years, 279 days	Palais des Sports, Paris, France	
34	Win	26–5–3	Victor Janas	PTS	10	Feb 4, 1937	19 years, 254 days	Salle Wagram, Paris, France	
33	Draw	25–5–3	Edouard Tenet	PTS	10	Jan 18, 1937	19 years, 237 days	Palais des Sports, Paris, France	
32	Win	25–5–2	Mario Casadei	DQ	10 (10)	Dec 7, 1936	19 years, 195 days	Palais des Sports, Paris, France	
31	Loss	24–5–2	Edouard Tenet	PTS	10	Nov 5, 1936	19 years, 163 days	Salle Wagram, Paris, France	
30	Win	24–4–2	Carmelo Candel	PTS	10	Aug 2, 1936	19 years, 68 days	Arenes d'Eckmühl, Oran, French Algeria	
29	Loss	23–4–2	Victor Janas	MD	10	May 2, 1936	18 years, 342 days	Automobile Hall, Algiers, French Algeria	
28	Win	23–3–2	Carmelo Candel	KO	8 (10)	Apr 19, 1936	18 years, 329 days	Marseille, France	
27	Win	22–3–2	Vilda Jaks	PTS	12	Apr 2, 1936	18 years, 312 days	Salle Wagram, Paris, France	
26	Win	21–3–2	Adrien Anneet	PTS	10	Mar 5, 1936	18 years, 284 days	Salle Wagram, Paris, France	
25	Loss	20–3–2	Carmelo Candel	PTS	10	Feb 7, 1936	18 years, 257 days	Salle Wagram, Paris, France	
24	Loss	20–2–2	Kid Tunero	PTS	10	Jan 6, 1936	18 years, 225 days	Palais des Sports, Paris, France	
23	Win	20–1–2	Victor Janas	PTS	10	Dec 9, 1935	18 years, 197 days	Palais des Sports, Paris, France	
22	Win	19–1–2	Vilda Jaks	PTS	10	Nov 22, 1935	18 years, 180 days	Salle Wagram, Paris, France	
21	Win	18–1–2	Julien Faes	PTS	10	Oct 28, 1935	18 years, 155 days	Velodrome d'Hiver, Paris, France	
20	Win	17–1–2	Marcel Foulon	TKO	6 (10)	Oct 15, 1935	18 years, 142 days	Central Sporting Club, Paris, France	
19	Loss	16–1–2	Vilda Jaks	PTS	10	Sep 20, 1935	18 years, 117 days	Salle Wagram, Paris, France	
18	Draw	16–0–2	Kid Tunero	PTS	10	Sep 3, 1935	18 years, 100 days	Central Sporting Club, Paris, France	
17	Win	16–0–1	Andre Georges Nioche	PTS	10	Aug 20, 1935	18 years, 86 days	Central Sporting Club, Paris, France	
16	Win	15–0–1	Assane Diouf	PTS	10	Aug 6, 1935	18 years, 72 days	Central Sporting Club, Paris, France	
15	Win	14–0–1	Jany Ambreski	PTS	10	Jul 3, 1935	18 years, 38 days	Athens, Greece	Venue needs verification
14	Win	13–0–1	Paul Jeancenelle	PTS	6	May 4, 1935	17 years, 343 days	Palais des Sports, Paris, France	
13	Win	12–0–1	Andre Georges Nioche	PTS	10	Apr 6, 1935	17 years, 315 days	Salle des Îlets, Montluçon, France	
12	Win	11–0–1	Francisco Garcia Lluch	PTS	10	Feb 5, 1935	17 years, 255 days	Central Sporting Club, Paris, France	
11	Win	10–0–1	Andre Georges Nioche	PTS	10	Jan 30, 1935	17 years, 249 days	Paris-Ring, Paris, France	
10	Win	9–0–1	Martinaux	PTS	6	Jan 9, 1935	17 years, 228 days	Paris-Ring, Paris, France	
9	Win	8–0–1	Lucien Hallart	PTS	8	Jan 4, 1935	17 years, 223 days	Élysée Montmartre, Paris, France	
8	Win	7–0–1	Marcel Blaise	PTS	10	Dec 19, 1934	17 years, 207 days	Paris-Ring, Paris, France	
7	Win	6–0–1	Georges Ries	PTS	10	Dec 6, 1934	17 years, 194 days	Ring de Belleville, Paris, France	
6	Win	5–0–1	Marcel Thouvenin	PTS	6	Nov 14, 1934	17 years, 172 days	Paris-Ring, Paris, France	
5	Win	4–0–1	Guillaume Taddei	TKO	4 (10)	Nov 10, 1934	17 years, 168 days	Central Sporting Club, Paris, France	
4	Win	3–0–1	Roger Damagnez	PTS	10	Oct 30, 1934	17 years, 157 days	Paris-Ring, Paris, France	
3	Draw	2–0–1	Paul Jeancenelle	PTS	6	Oct 17, 1934	17 years, 144 days	Paris-Ring, Paris, France	
2	Win	2–0	Curzio Sala	KO	7 (10)	Aug, 1934	N/A	Athens, Greece	Date unavailable
1	Win	1–0	Theodore Korenyi	KO	2 (10)	Jul, 1934	N/A	Athens, Greece	Professional debut Date uncertain

== See also ==
- List of light heavyweight boxing champions

== Notes and references ==
Achievements
Preceded by Billy Conn; Vacated	NBA Light Heavyweight Champion; 13 January 1941 – 22 May 1941	Succeeded by Gus Lesnevich
