= Gus Lesnevich =

American boxer (1915–1947)

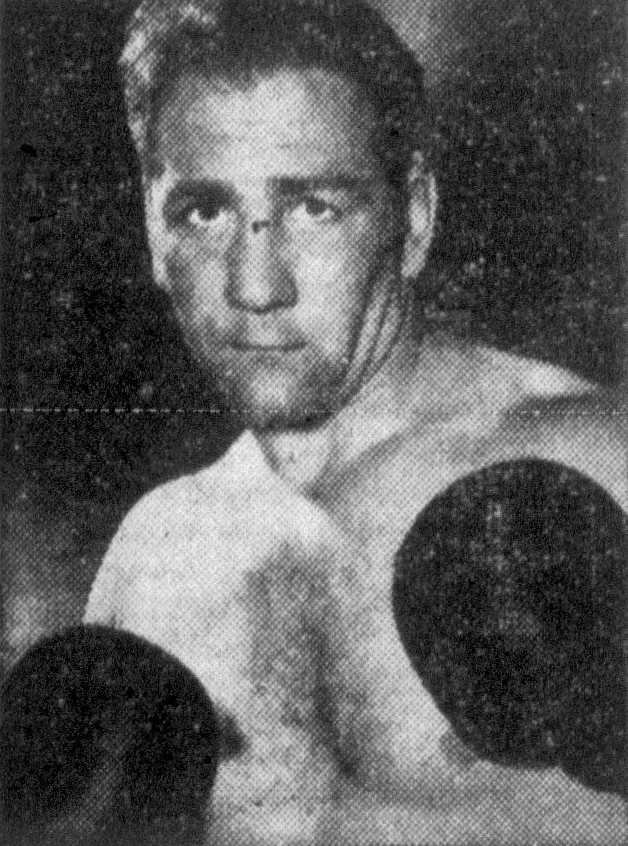
- Lesnevich in 1947

Personal information
- Nickname: The Russian Lion
- Born: February 22, 1915 Cliffside Park, New Jersey, U.S.
- Died: February 28, 1964 (aged 49)
- Height: 5 ft 9 in (1.75 m)
- Weight: Light heavyweight

Boxing career
- Reach: 73 in (185 cm)
- Stance: Orthodox

Boxing record
- Total fights: 80
- Wins: 61
- Win by KO: 23
- Losses: 14
- Draws: 5

Gustav George Lesnevich (February 22, 1915 – February 28, 1964) was an American professional boxer who held the world light-heavyweight championship from 1941 to 1948.

== Boxing career ==
Lesnevich was born and raised in Cliffside Park, New Jersey. He turned pro in 1934 and in 1939 took on World Light Heavyweight champion Billy Conn, but lost a decision.

In 1941, he took on Anton Christoforidis, winning the NBA light heavyweight title by decision. Later that year he defended the title twice against Tami Mauriello, winning both decisions to become the undisputed light heavyweight champion. In 1948, he lost a decision to Freddie Mills along with his title recognition. In 1949, he took on Ezzard Charles, but was TKO'd in the 7th, and retired after the bout. In addition to his various accolades, Lesnevich was named Ring Magazine Fighter of the Year in 1947.

Lesnevich served in the United States Coast Guard from 1943 to 1945.

== Professional boxing record ==
80 fights	61 wins	14 losses
By knockout	23	5
By decision	38	9
Draws	5	

No.	Result	Record	Opponent	Type	Round(s)	Date	Location	Notes
80	Loss	61–14–5	Ezzard Charles	RTD	7 (15)	Aug 10, 1949	Yankee Stadium, Bronx, New York City, New York, U.S.	For NBA heavyweight title
79	Loss	61–13–5	Joey Maxim	UD	15	May 23, 1949	Cincinnati Gardens, Cincinnati, Ohio, U.S.	For vacant NBA American light heavyweight title
78	Win	61–12–5	Eldridge Eatman	KO	1 (10)	Mar 3, 1949	Mosque Theater, Newark, New Jersey, U.S.	
77	Loss	60–12–5	Freddie Mills	PTS	15	Jul 26, 1948	White City Stadium, White City, London, England	Lost NYSAC, NBA, and The Ring light heavyweight titles
76	Win	60–11–5	Billy Fox	KO	1 (15)	Mar 5, 1948	Madison Square Garden, New York City, New York, U.S.	Retained NYSAC, NBA, and The Ring light heavyweight titles
75	Win	59–11–5	Tami Mauriello	TKO	7 (10)	Oct 31, 1947	Madison Square Garden, New York City, New York, U.S.	
74	Win	58–11–5	Tami Mauriello	UD	10	Jul 30, 1947	Ebbets Field, Brooklyn, New York City, New York, U.S.	
73	Win	57–11–5	Melio Bettina	KO	1 (10)	May 23, 1947	Madison Square Garden, New York City, New York, U.S.	
72	Win	56–11–5	Billy Fox	TKO	10 (15)	Feb 28, 1947	Madison Square Garden, New York City, New York, U.S.	Retained NYSAC, NBA, and The Ring light heavyweight titles
71	Loss	55–11–5	Bruce Woodcock	KO	8 (10)	Sep 17, 1946	Harringay Arena, Harringay, London, England	
70	Win	55–10–5	Freddie Mills	TKO	10 (15)	May 14, 1946	Harringay Arena, Harringay, London, England	Retained NYSAC, NBA, and The Ring light heavyweight titles
69	Loss	54–10–5	Lee Oma	TKO	5 (10)	Feb 22, 1946	Madison Square Garden, New York City, New York, U.S.	
68	Win	54–9–5	Joe Kahut	KO	1 (10)	Jan 11, 1946	Auditorium, Portland, Oregon, U.S.	
67	Loss	53–9–5	Jimmy Bivins	UD	10	Mar 11, 1942	Arena, Cleveland, Ohio, U.S.	
66	Loss	53–8–5	Bob Pastor	SD	15	Jan 30, 1942	Madison Square Garden, New York City, New York, U.S.	
65	Win	53–7–5	Tami Mauriello	SD	15	Nov 14, 1941	Madison Square Garden, New York City, New York, U.S.	Retained NYSAC, NBA, and The Ring light heavyweight titles
64	Win	52–7–5	Tami Mauriello	SD	15	Aug 26, 1941	Madison Square Garden, New York City, New York, U.S.	Retained NBA light heavyweight title; Won vacant NYSAC and The Ring light heavyweight titles
63	Win	51–7–5	Anton Christoforidis	UD	15	May 22, 1941	Madison Square Garden, New York City, New York, U.S.	Won NBA light heavyweight title
62	Win	50–7–5	Nathan Mann	UD	10	Feb 27, 1941	Olympia Stadium, Detroit, Michigan, U.S.	
61	Win	49–7–5	Jack Marshall	KO	4 (10)	Dec 16, 1940	Laurel Garden, Newark, New Jersey, U.S.	
60	Loss	48–7–5	Al Delaney	PTS	10	Nov 23, 1940	Ridgewood Grove, Brooklyn, New York City, New York, U.S.	
59	Win	48–6–5	Henry Cooper	RTD	4 (10)	Sep 5, 1940	Belmont Park, Garfield, New Jersey, U.S.	
58	Win	47–6–5	Wally Sears	PTS	10	Jul 22, 1940	Belmont Park, Garfield, New Jersey, U.S.	
57	Loss	46–6–5	Billy Conn	UD	15	Jun 5, 1940	Olympia Stadium, Detroit, Michigan, U.S.	For NYSAC, NBA, and The Ring light heavyweight titles
56	Win	46–5–5	Dave Clark	UD	10	Jan 1, 1940	Fair Grounds Coliseum, Detroit, Michigan, U.S.	
55	Loss	45–5–5	Billy Conn	UD	15	Nov 17, 1939	Madison Square Garden, New York City, New York, U.S.	For NYSAC, NBA, and The Ring light heavyweight titles
54	Win	45–4–5	Dave Clark	KO	1 (10)	Jun 22, 1939	Nutley Velodrome, Nutley, New Jersey, U.S.	
53	Win	44–4–5	Larry Lane	PTS	10	May 15, 1939	Arena, Trenton, New Jersey, U.S.	
52	Win	43–4–5	Bob Olin	PTS	12	Feb 2, 1939	Sydney Sports Ground, Sydney, New South Wales, Australia	
51	Win	42–4–5	Alabama Kid	RTD	9 (12)	Jan 13, 1939	Sydney Sports Ground, Sydney, New South Wales, Australia	
50	Win	41–4–5	Ambrose Palmer	PTS	12	Dec 8, 1938	Sydney Sports Ground, Sydney, New South Wales, Australia	
49	Loss	40–4–5	Ron Richards	PTS	15	Oct 27, 1938	Sydney Sports Ground, Sydney, New South Wales, Australia	
48	Win	40–3–5	Stanley Hasrato	KO	1 (10)	Jun 16, 1938	Miller Stadium, West New York, New Jersey, U.S.	
47	Win	39–3–5	Buddy Ryan	PTS	10	Jun 1, 1938	Miller Stadium, West New York, New Jersey, U.S.	
46	Win	38–3–5	Lou Brouillard	PTS	10	Mar 23, 1938	Hippodrome, New York City, New York, U.S.	
45	Win	37–3–5	Jack Kirkland	KO	1 (10)	Feb 24, 1938	Beach Arena, Miami Beach, Florida, U.S.	
44	Win	36–3–5	Ben Brown	UD	10	Feb 8, 1938	Coliseum, Coral Gables, Florida, U.S.	
43	Draw	35–3–5	Joey Parks	PTS	10	Jan 7, 1938	Coliseum, Saint Louis, Missouri, U.S.	
42	Win	35–3–4	Herbie Katz	PTS	8	Nov 19, 1937	Madison Square Garden, New York City, New York, U.S.	
41	Draw	34–3–4	Allen Matthews	MD	10	Oct 5, 1937	Crystal Pool, Seattle, Washington, U.S.	
40	Win	34–3–3	Alabama Kid	PTS	10	Sep 3, 1937	Dreamland Auditorium, San Francisco, California, U.S.	
39	Win	33–3–3	Atilio Sabatino	PTS	10	Aug 24, 1937	Olympic Auditorium, Los Angeles, California, U.S.	
38	Win	32–3–3	Young Stuhley	PTS	10	Jun 22, 1937	Olympic Auditorium, Los Angeles, California, U.S.	
37	Win	31–3–3	Johnny Romero	KO	7 (10)	May 14, 1937	Legion Stadium, Hollywood, California, U.S.	
36	Loss	30–3–3	Young Corbett III	TKO	5 (10)	Mar 12, 1937	Dreamland Auditorium, San Francisco, California, U.S.	
35	Win	30–2–3	Tony Celli	PTS	8	Feb 20, 1937	Ridgewood Grove, Brooklyn, New York City, New York, U.S.	
34	Loss	29–2–3	Freddie Steele	TKO	2 (10)	Nov 17, 1936	Olympic Auditorium, Los Angeles, California, U.S.	
33	Win	29–1–3	Young Stuhley	KO	9 (10)	Nov 4, 1936	Civic Auditorium, San Francisco, California, U.S.	
32	Draw	28–1–3	Marty Simmons	PTS	10	Oct 23, 1936	Legion Stadium, Hollywood, California, U.S.	
31	Win	28–1–2	Carmen Barth	PTS	10	Oct 9, 1936	Legion Stadium, Hollywood, California, U.S.	
30	Win	27–1–2	Ray Actis	PTS	10	Aug 21, 1936	Legion Stadium, Hollywood, California, U.S.	
29	Win	26–1–2	Louie Rogers	TKO	1 (6)	Jun 19, 1936	Legion Stadium, Hollywood, California, U.S.	
28	Win	25–1–2	Johnny Sikes	TKO	1 (6)	May 29, 1936	Legion Stadium, Hollywood, California, U.S.	
27	Win	24–1–2	Sammy Christian	PTS	4	May 19, 1936	Olympic Auditorium, Los Angeles, California, U.S.	
26	Win	23–1–2	Frankie Caris	PTS	10	Apr 13, 1936	Laurel Garden, Newark, New Jersey, U.S.	
25	Draw	22–1–2	Frankie Caris	PTS	10	Mar 16, 1936	Laurel Garden, Newark, New Jersey, U.S.	
24	Win	22–1–1	Billy Hood	PTS	8	Mar 11, 1936	Beach Arena, Miami Beach, Florida, U.S.	
23	Win	21–1–1	Eddie Whalen	TKO	5 (10)	Feb 4, 1936	Braddock Arena, Jersey City, New Jersey, U.S.	
22	Win	20–1–1	Butch Lynch	PTS	10	Dec 17, 1935	Braddock Arena, Jersey City, New Jersey, U.S.	
21	Win	19–1–1	Frank LoBianco	PTS	8	Dec 14, 1935	Ridgewood Grove, Brooklyn, New York City, New York, U.S.	
20	Win	18–1–1	Tony Celli	PTS	8	May 25, 1935	Ridgewood Grove, Brooklyn, New York City, New York, U.S.	
19	Win	17–1–1	Tom Chester	PTS	8	May 4, 1935	Ridgewood Grove, Brooklyn, New York City, New York, U.S.	
18	Win	16–1–1	Jimmy Varrelli	PTS	8	Apr 13, 1935	Ridgewood Grove, Brooklyn, New York City, New York, U.S.	
17	Draw	15–1–1	John Andersson	PTS	6	Mar 22, 1935	Madison Square Garden, New York City, New York, U.S.	
16	Win	15–1	John Andersson	PTS	8	Mar 2, 1935	Ridgewood Grove, Brooklyn, New York City, New York, U.S.	
15	Win	14–1	Jackie Aldare	PTS	8	Feb 2, 1935	Ridgewood Grove, Brooklyn, New York City, New York, U.S.	
14	Win	13–1	Bucky Lawless	KO	2 (8)	Jan 12, 1935	Ridgewood Grove, Brooklyn, New York City, New York, U.S.	
13	Win	12–1	Jackie Aldare	PTS	8	Dec 29, 1934	Ridgewood Grove, Brooklyn, New York City, New York, U.S.	
12	Win	11–1	Stanley Willardson	PTS	6	Dec 8, 1934	Ridgewood Grove, Brooklyn, New York City, New York, U.S.	
11	Loss	10–1	Jackie Aldare	SD	6	Nov 24, 1934	Ridgewood Grove, Brooklyn, New York City, New York, U.S.	
10	Win	10–0	Tom Chester	PTS	6	Nov 3, 1934	Ridgewood Grove, Brooklyn, New York City, New York, U.S.	
9	Win	9–0	Mark Hough	PTS	6	Oct 13, 1934	Ridgewood Grove, Brooklyn, New York City, New York, U.S.	
8	Win	8–0	Charley Weise	PTS	6	Sep 22, 1934	Ridgewood Grove, Brooklyn, New York City, New York, U.S.	
7	Win	7–0	Nicky Williams	PTS	6	Sep 13, 1934	Teterboro Airdrome, Hasbrouck Heights, New Jersey, U.S.	
6	Win	6–0	Frankie Cal	TKO	2 (6)	Jul 23, 1934	Oakland Outdoor Arena, Jersey City, New Jersey, U.S.	
5	Win	5–0	Roy Frisco	PTS	6	Jun 16, 1934	Ridgewood Grove, Brooklyn, New York City, New York, U.S.	
4	Win	4–0	Willie Kline	PTS	6	Jun 9, 1934	Ridgewood Grove, Brooklyn, New York City, New York, U.S.	
3	Win	3–0	Jimmy Calabrese	KO	1 (6)	May 29, 1934	Kennel Track, Fort Lee, New Jersey, U.S.	
2	Win	2–0	Sid Cohen	TKO	3 (6)	May 19, 1934	Ridgewood Grove, Brooklyn, New York City, New York, U.S.	
1	Win	1–0	Justin Hoffman	TKO	2 (6)	May 5, 1934	Ridgewood Grove, Brooklyn, New York City, New York, U.S.	

== Titles in boxing ==
=== Major world titles ===
- NYSAC light heavyweight champion (175 lbs)
- NBA (WBA) light heavyweight champion (175 lbs)

=== The Ring magazine titles ===
- The Ring light heavyweight champion (175 lbs)

=== Undisputed titles ===
- Undisputed light heavyweight champion

== See also ==
- List of light heavyweight boxing champions

Achievements
Preceded by Anton Christoforidis	NBA Light Heavyweight Champion; May 22, 1941– July 26, 1948	Succeeded by Freddie Mills
Preceded by Billy Conn; Vacated	NYSAC Light Heavyweight Champion; August 26, 1941 – July 26, 1948	Succeeded by Freddie Mills
Preceded by Billy Conn; Vacated	World Light Heavyweight Champion; August 26, 1941 – July 26, 1948	Succeeded by Freddie Mills
