= Joey Maxim =

American boxer (1922–2001)

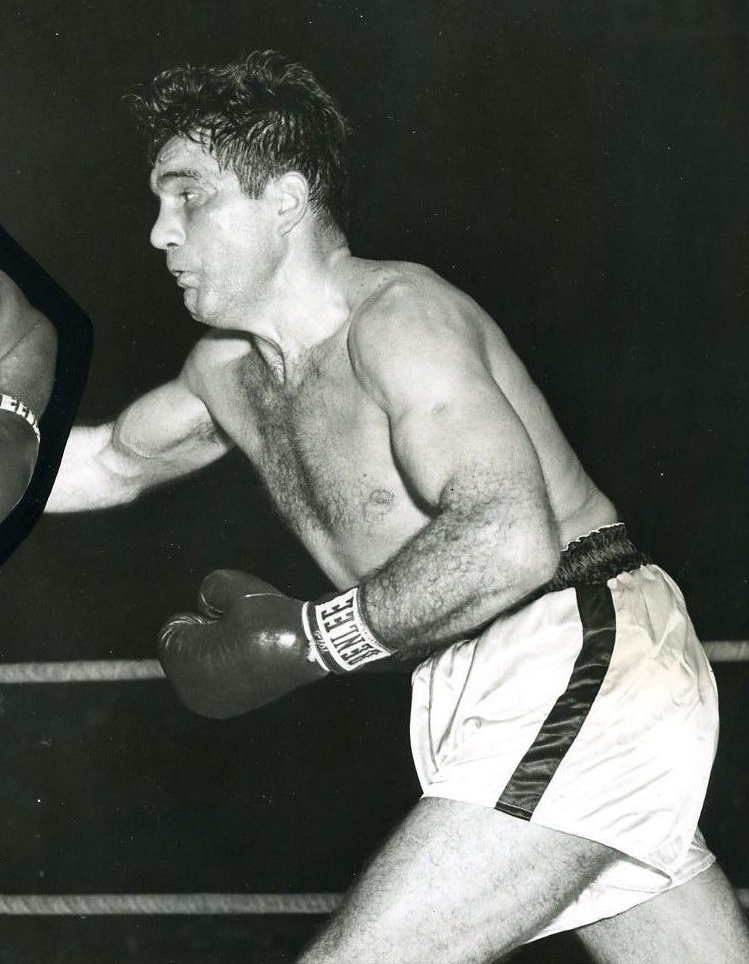
- Maxim in 1952

Personal information
- Born: Giuseppe Antonio Berardinelli; March 28, 1922 Cleveland, Ohio, U.S.
- Died: June 2, 2001 (aged 79) West Palm Beach, Florida, U.S.
- Height: 6 ft 1 in (1.85 m)
- Weight: Light heavyweight
- Spouse: Michelina (died 1977)
- Children: 2

Boxing career
- Reach: 72 1/2 in (184 cm)
- Stance: Orthodox

Boxing record
- Total fights: 116
- Wins: 83
- Win by KO: 22
- Losses: 29
- Draws: 4
- No contests: 0

Giuseppe Antonio Berardinelli (March 28, 1922 – June 2, 2001) was an American professional boxer. He was the World Light Heavyweight Champion from 1950 to 1952. He took the ring name Joey Maxim from the Maxim gun, the first fully automatic machine gun, based on his ability to rapidly throw a large number of left jabs.

== Early life ==
Giuseppe Antonio Berardinelli was born on March 28, 1922, in Collinwood, a neighborhood of Cleveland, Ohio, where he was raised.

== Career ==
=== Early career ===
Maxim learned to box at a very young age. Following a successful amateur career, during which he won the Golden Gloves, he turned professional in 1940. Maxim boxed fairly regularly at exhibitions during the war years while serving as a military police officer at Miami Beach, Florida.

==== Maxim becomes world champion ====
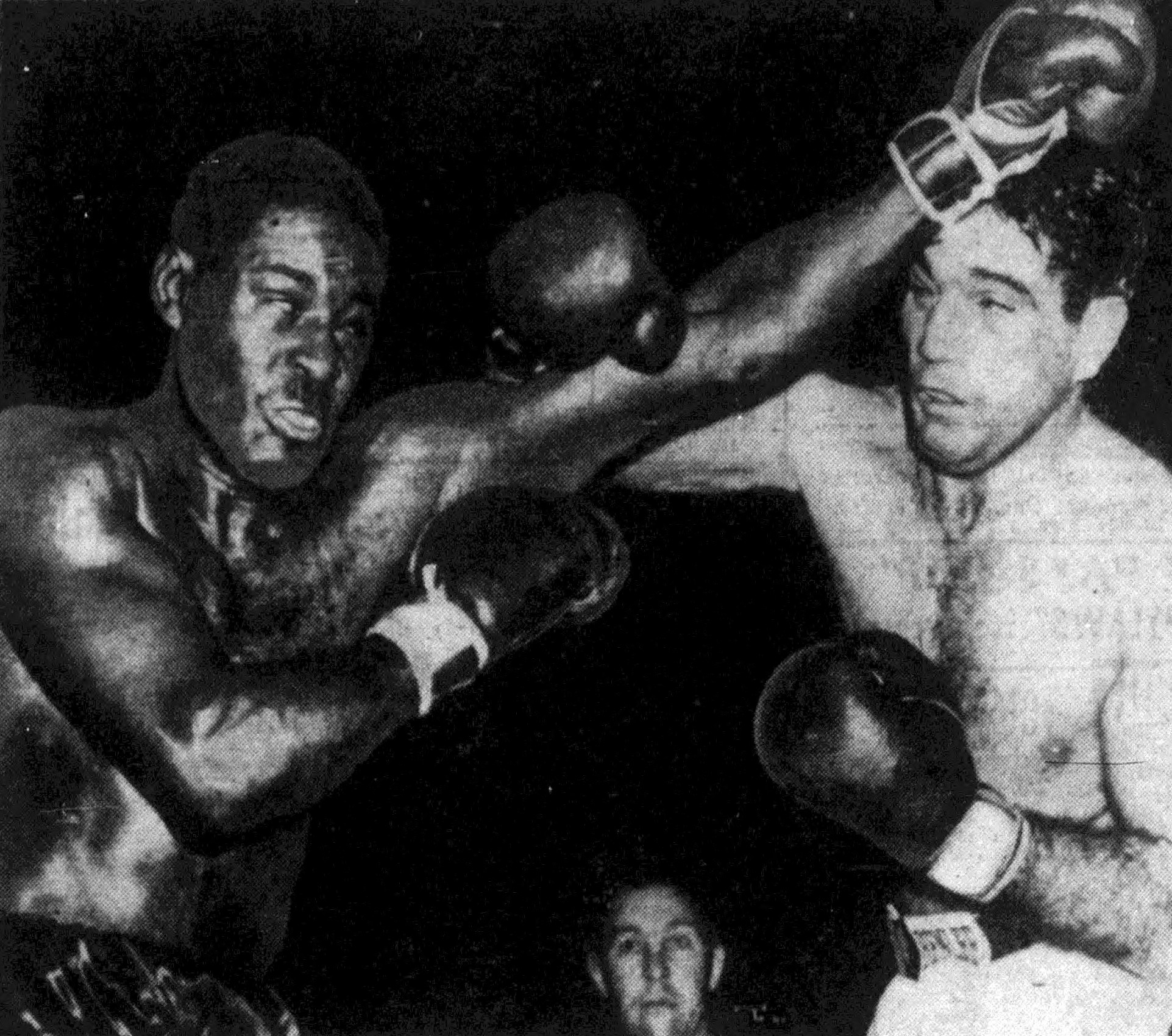
Joey Maxim exchanges blows with Ezzard Charles in 1951

It is somewhat surprising that Maxim had to wait so long for a world title shot, he was 28 and had already fought 87 times as a professional, considering his undoubted ability. His chance came on January 24, 1950, against British boxer Freddie Mills, who was making his first defense, at London's Earl's Court Exhibition Centre. Maxim, very much the underdog against the popular Englishman, won the fight by knockout in the 10th round. After the fight three of Mills's teeth were found embedded in Maxim's left glove, Mills never fought again.

Maxim's next major fight was on May 30, 1951, when he made a bid for Ezzard Charles's world heavyweight title. Maxim was unsuccessful, losing on points.

==== June 25, 1952: Joey Maxim vs. Sugar Ray Robinson ====
The most famous fight of Maxim's career was on June 25, 1952, when he made his second defense of his world light heavyweight crown, against Sugar Ray Robinson at Yankee Stadium. The fight had originally been scheduled for June 23, but was postponed due to torrential rain. By the time the fight took place New York City was in the midst of a record heat wave.

During the fight Robinson built up a large points lead over the champion, although Maxim began to come on later in the fight. Robinson gradually succumbed to hyperthermia and Maxim's harder punches. He collapsed to the canvas at the end of the 13th round, but managed to stagger back to his corner. However, Robinson failed to answer the bell at the start of the 14th, even though he only had to remain on his feet to win the fight and Maxim won by a technical knockout. This was the only time that Robinson was stopped in his 200 fight career.

By this time the original referee, Ruby Goldstein, had himself been forced to retire from the fight after collapsing into the ropes complaining that he could no longer continue. This meant that a substitute referee, Ray Miller, had to be called out to finish the fight. Goldstein and Robinson were not the only people who had to be stretchered from the stadium: several dozen spectators also collapsed during the fight. Between them, the two fighters lost over 20 pounds in weight during the fight.

=== Late career ===
Despite winning, the Robinson fight took a heavy toll on Maxim. He lost his world title six months later to the veteran Archie Moore. Following this loss Maxim, formerly one of the division's most active fighters, fought only 14 fights in the remaining 6 years of his career. These fights included two rematches with "The Old Mongoose" Archie Moore, both of which Maxim lost. Maxim retired in 1958 after losing six consecutive fights.

Maxim retired with a record of 82 wins (21 by KO), 29 losses, and 4 draws; in his 115 fight career, he was knocked out only once. During his career he defeated such legendary figures as Jersey Joe Walcott, Jimmy Bivins, Sugar Ray Robinson, and Floyd Patterson.

== Life after boxing ==
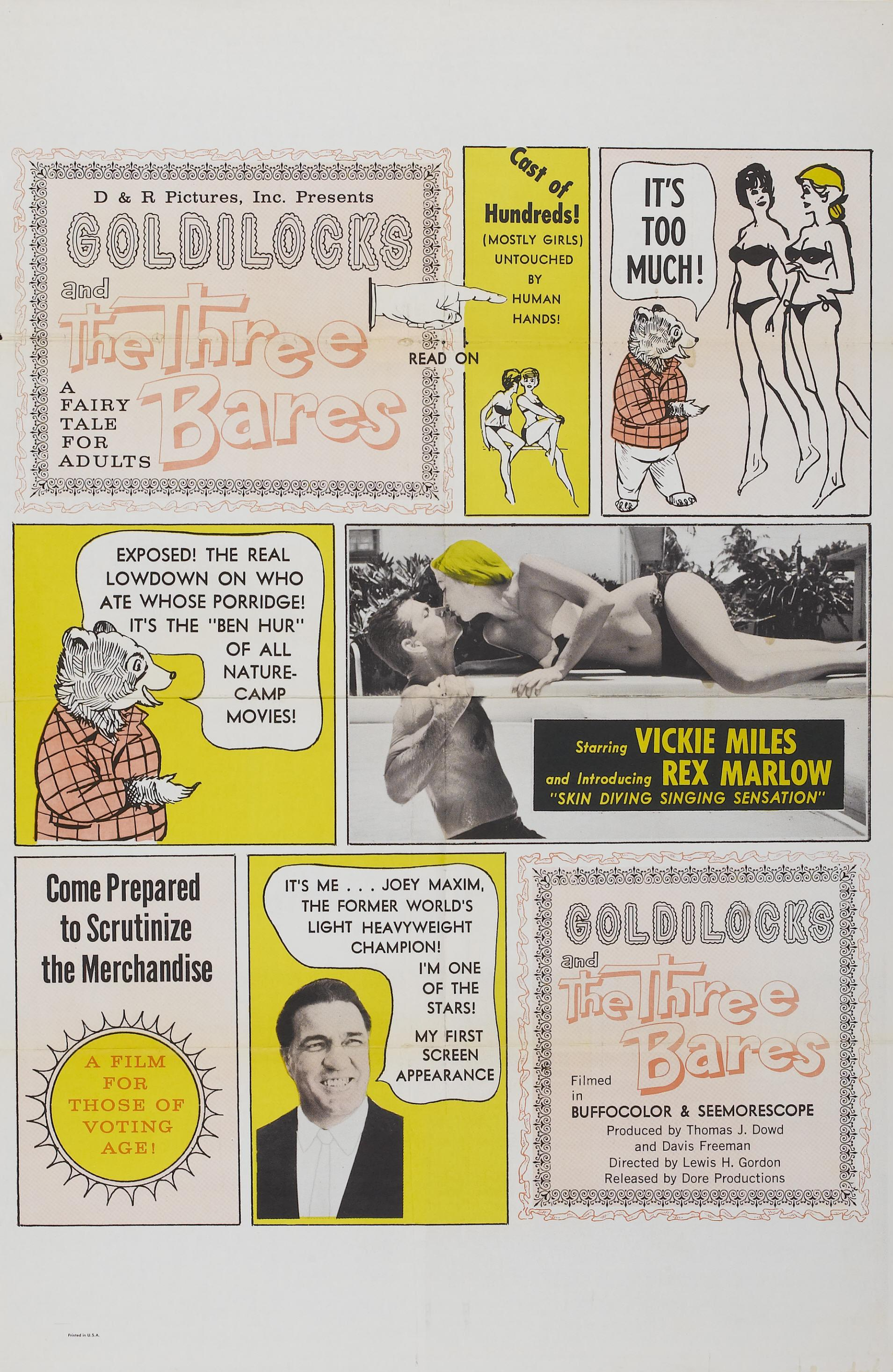
"Goldilocks and the Three Bares" poster

After his retirement Maxim spent time as a stand-up comic, restaurateur, and taxi driver. He also served as a greeter at hotels and casinos located in Las Vegas.

He appeared in Herschell Gordon Lewis's 1963 nudie-cutie Goldilocks and the Three Bares as himself, playing a nightclub owner. The movie was billed as the "first nudist musical." He was prominently featured on the movie poster, with the blurb:

"It's me...Joey Maxim, the former world's light heavyweight champion! I'm one of the stars! My first screen appearance."

The role did not lead to any more motion picture work, though he did appear as an extra in the 1999 film Play It to the Bone.

He was inducted into the International Boxing Hall of Fame in 1994.

Maxim's wife Michelina, with whom he had two daughters, died in 1977.

In February 2001, Maxim suffered a stroke. He died in West Palm Beach, Florida on June 2, 2001. In addition to his daughters, he was survived by his mother, Henrietta Berardinelli, who was 97 years old (died at 101 in 2006), and six great-grandchildren.

== Professional boxing record ==
115 fights	82 wins	29 losses
By knockout	21	1
By decision	61	27
By disqualification	0	1
Draws	4	

No.	Result	Record	Opponent	Type	Round	Date	Location	Notes
115	Loss	83–28–4	Ulli Ritter	PTS	10	May 17, 1958	Eisstadion am Friedrichspark, Mannheim, Baden-Württemberg	
114	Loss	83–27–4	Giacomo Bozzano	PTS	10	Apr 27, 1958	Milan, Lombardy	
113	Loss	83–26–4	Heinz Neuhaus	PTS	10	Apr 12, 1958	Killesbergpark, Stuttgart, Baden-Württemberg	
112	Loss	83–25–4	Bobo Olson	SD	10	Jun 18, 1957	Portland Auditorium, Portland, Oregon	
111	Loss	83–24–4	Eddie Machen	UD	10	May 3, 1957	Freedom Hall, Louisville, Kentucky	
110	Loss	83–23–4	Eddie Machen	UD	10	Jan 25, 1957	Miami Beach Auditorium, Miami Beach, Florida	
109	Win	83–22–4	Edgardo Romero	PTS	10	Sep 29, 1956	Vancouver, British Columbia	
108	Loss	82–22–4	Willie Pastrano	UD	10	Jun 28, 1955	New Orleans Municipal Auditorium, New Orleans, Louisiana	
107	Loss	82–21–4	Bobo Olson	UD	10	Apr 13, 1955	Cow Palace, Daly City, California	
106	Win	82–20–4	Paul Andrews	UD	10	Nov 24, 1954	Chicago Stadium, Chicago, Illinois	
105	Win	81–20–4	Floyd Patterson	UD	8	Jun 7, 1954	Boxing From Eastern Parkway, Brooklyn, New York	
104	Loss	80–20–4	Archie Moore	UD	15	Jan 27, 1954	Miami Orange Bowl, Miami, Florida	For NBA, NYSAC, and The Ring light heavyweight titles
103	Loss	80–19–4	Archie Moore	UD	15	Jun 24, 1953	Ogden Stadium, Ogden, Utah	For NBA, NYSAC, and The Ring light heavyweight titles
102	Win	80–18–4	Danny Nardico	UD	10	Mar 4, 1953	Miami Stadium, Miami, Florida	
101	Loss	79–18–4	Archie Moore	UD	15	Dec 17, 1952	Arena, Saint Louis, Missouri	Lost NBA, NYSAC, and The Ring light heavyweight titles
100	Win	79–17–4	Sugar Ray Robinson	RTD	14	Jun 25, 1952	Yankee Stadium, Bronx, New York	Retained NBA, NYSAC, and The Ring light heavyweight titles
99	Win	78–17–4	Ted Lowry	UD	10	Mar 6, 1952	Saint Paul Auditorium, Saint Paul, Minnesota	
98	Loss	77–17–4	Ezzard Charles	UD	12	Dec 12, 1951	Cow Palace, Daly City, California	
97	Win	77–16–4	Irish Bob Murphy	UD	15	Aug 22, 1951	Madison Square Garden, New York City	Retained NBA, NYSAC, and The Ring light heavyweight titles
96	Loss	76–16–4	Ezzard Charles	UD	15	May 30, 1951	Chicago Stadium, Chicago, Illinois	For NBA, NYSAC, and The Ring heavyweight titles
95	Win	76–15–4	Hubert Hood	KO	3	Jan 27, 1951	Indianapolis Naval Reserve Armory, Indianapolis, Indiana	
94	Win	75–15–4	Dave Whitlock	KO	4	Dec 11, 1950	Winterland Arena, San Francisco, California	
93	Win	74–15–4	Big Boy Brown	UD	10	Nov 22, 1950	Wharton Field House, Moline, Illinois	
92	Win	73–15–4	Bill Petersen	PTS	10	Oct 10, 1950	Fairgrounds Coliseum, Salt Lake City, Utah	
91	Win	72–15–4	Jackie Swanson	KO	3	Sep 25, 1950	Radio Center Arena, Huntington, West Virginia	
90	Win	71–15–4	Bill Petersen	KO	6	May 12, 1950	Memphis, Tennessee	
89	Win	70–15–4	Joe Dawson	KO	2	Apr 19, 1950	Omaha Civic Auditorium, Omaha, Nebraska	
88	Win	69–15–4	Freddie Mills	KO	10	Jan 24, 1950	Empress Hall, Earl's Court, Kensington, London	Won NBA, NYSAC, and The Ring light heavyweight titles
87	Win	68–15–4	Bill Petersen	PTS	10	Dec 9, 1949	Grand Rapids, Michigan	
86	Win	67–15–4	Pat McCafferty	TKO	4	Nov 30, 1949	Wichita, Kansas	
85	Win	66–15–4	Joe Kahut	TKO	5	Oct 25, 1949	Cincinnati Gardens, Cincinnati, Ohio	
84	Win	65–15–4	Gus Lesnevich	UD	15	May 23, 1949	Cincinnati Gardens, Cincinnati, Ohio	Won U.S. light heavyweight title
83	Loss	64–15–4	Ezzard Charles	MD	15	Feb 28, 1949	Cincinnati Gardens, Cincinnati, Ohio	
82	Win	64–14–4	Jimmy Bivins	SD	10	Dec 7, 1948	Cleveland Arena, Cleveland, Ohio	
81	Win	63–14–4	Bob Satterfield	UD	10	Nov 12, 1948	Chicago Stadium, Chicago, Illinois	
80	Loss	62–14–4	Joe Kahut	SD	15	Oct 19, 1948	Auditorium, Portland, Oregon	
79	Win	62–13–4	Bill Petersen	UD	10	Sep 28, 1948	Auditorium, Portland, Oregon	Won Pacific Northwest heavyweight title
78	Win	61–13–4	Bill Petersen	UD	10	Jun 29, 1948	Seattle Ice Arena, Seattle, Washington	
77	Win	60–13–4	Joe Kahut	UD	10	Jun 22, 1948	Auditorium, Portland, Oregon	
76	Draw	59–13–4	Pat Valentino	PTS	10	Jun 7, 1948	San Francisco Civic Auditorium, San Francisco, California	
75	Win	59–13–3	Roy Hawkins	PTS	10	May 27, 1948	Tacoma Ice Palace, Tacoma, Washington	
74	Win	58–13–3	Francisco de la Cruz	PTS	10	May 7, 1948	El Paso County Coliseum, El Paso, Texas	
73	Win	57–13–3	Whitey Berlier	PTS	10	Apr 27, 1948	Houston, Texas	
72	Draw	56–13–3	Pat Valentino	PTS	10	Mar 22, 1948	San Francisco Civic Auditorium, San Francisco, California	
71	Win	56–13–2	Tony Bosnich	UD	10	Feb 13, 1948	San Francisco Civic Auditorium, San Francisco, California	
70	Win	55–13–2	Robert Lee Sikes Jr.	PTS	10	Feb 2, 1948	Barton Coliseum, Little Rock, Arkansas	
69	Win	54–13–2	Olle Tandberg	SD	10	Jan 9, 1948	Madison Square Garden, New York City	
68	Win	53–13–2	Billy "Chicken" Thompson	UD	10	Dec 8, 1947	Philadelphia Arena, Philadelphia, Pennsylvania	
67	Win	52–13–2	Bob Foxworth	SD	10	Nov 12, 1947	Chicago Stadium, Chicago, Illinois	
66	Win	51–13–2	John Thomas	PTS	10	Sep 17, 1947	Cleveland, Ohio	
65	Win	50–13–2	Clarence Jones	KO	5	Sep 8, 1947	Wheeling Island Stadium, Wheeling, West Virginia	
64	Loss	49–13–2	Jersey Joe Walcott	SD	10	Jun 23, 1947	Gilmore Field, Los Angeles, California	
63	Win	49–12–2	Charley Roth	KO	4	May 12, 1947	Louisville, Kentucky	
62	Win	48–12–2	Marty Clark	TKO	7	Jan 28, 1947	Miami Orange Bowl, Miami, Florida	
61	Loss	47–12–2	Jersey Joe Walcott	MD	10	Jan 6, 1947	Philadelphia Convention Center, Cincinnati, Ohio	
60	Win	47–11–2	Jack Marshall	PTS	10	Dec 17, 1946	Houston, Texas	
59	Win	46–11–2	Dolph Quijano	PTS	10	Dec 12, 1946	El Paso County Coliseum, El Paso, Texas	
58	Win	45–11–2	Jimmy Webb	TKO	6	Dec 3, 1946	Houston, Texas	
57	Draw	44–11–2	Jimmy Richie	PTS	10	Nov 12, 1946	Kiel Auditorium, Saint Louis, Missouri	
56	Win	44–11–1	Bearcat Jones	KO	5	Oct 16, 1946	Rollercade, Toledo, Ohio	
55	Win	43–11–1	Clarence Jones	PTS	10	Oct 10, 1946	Akron Armory, Akron, Ohio	
54	Win	42–11–1	Jersey Joe Walcott	PTS	10	Aug 28, 1946	Public Service Ball Park, Camden, New Jersey	
53	Win	41–11–1	Henry Cooper	PTS	10	Aug 14, 1946	Comiskey Park, Chicago, Illinois	
52	Win	40–11–1	Phil Muscato	UD	10	Aug 2, 1946	Red Wing Stadium, Rochester, New York	
51	Win	39–11–1	Phil Muscato	SD	12	May 14, 1946	Buffalo Memorial Auditorium, Buffalo, New York	
50	Draw	38–11–1	Charley Eagle	PTS	10	May 7, 1946	Buffalo Memorial Auditorium, Buffalo, New York	
49	Loss	38–11	Phil Muscato	UD	10	Apr 9, 1946	Buffalo Memorial Auditorium, Buffalo, New York	
48	Win	38–10	Buddy Walker	UD	10	Apr 1, 1946	Baltimore Coliseum, Baltimore, Maryland	
47	Win	37–10	Ralph DeJohn	TKO	1	Mar 27, 1946	Buffalo Memorial Auditorium, Buffalo, New York	DeJohn broke his arm during the fight.
46	Loss	36–10	John Thomas	PTS	10	Mar 11, 1946	St. Nicholas Arena, New York City	
45	Win	36–9	Panther Williams	UD	10	Mar 4, 1946	Arena Gardens, Detroit, Michigan	
44	Win	35–9	Cleo Everett	UD	10	Nov 26, 1945	Arena Gardens, Detroit, Michigan	
43	Win	34–9	Clarence Brown	UD	10	Apr 16, 1945	Arcadia Gardens, Detroit, Michigan	
42	Win	33–9	Johnny Flanagan	PTS	8	Feb 2, 1945	Chicago Coliseum, Chicago, Illinois	
41	Loss	32–9	John Kowalczyk	SD	10	Dec 19, 1944	Cleveland Arena, Cleveland, Ohio	
40	Loss	32–8	Lloyd Marshall	UD	10	Jul 27, 1944	Lakefront Stadium, Cleveland, Ohio	
39	Win	31–8	Frank Androff	PTS	8	Jun 26, 1944	Marigold Gardens, Chicago, Illinois	
38	Win	30–8	Bob Garner	PTS	10	May 29, 1944	Marigold Gardens, Chicago, Illinois	
37	Win	29–8	Buddy Walker	UD	10	Apr 28, 1944	Detroit, Michigan	
36	Win	28–8	George Parks	PTS	10	Jan 31, 1944	Turner's Arena, Washington, District of Columbia	
35	Win	27–8	Claudio Villar	TKO	6	Dec 1, 1943	Cleveland Arena, Cleveland, Ohio	
34	Win	26–8	Buddy Scott	PTS	10	Oct 29, 1943	Chicago Stadium, Chicago, Illinois	
33	Win	25–8	Nate Bolden	PTS	10	Aug 9, 1943	Wrigley Field, Chicago, Illinois	
32	Win	24–8	Al Jordan	PTS	10	Apr 26, 1943	Marigold Gardens, Chicago, Illinois	
31	Win	23–8	Curtis Sheppard	UD	10	Mar 31, 1943	Cleveland Arena, Cleveland, Ohio	
30	Loss	22–8	Curtis Sheppard	KO	1	Mar 10, 1943	Cleveland Arena, Cleveland, Ohio	
29	Win	22–7	Clarence Brown	PTS	10	Feb 15, 1943	Chicago Stadium, Chicago, Illinois	
28	Win	21–7	Clarence Brown	PTS	8	Jan 18, 1943	Marigold Gardens, Chicago, Illinois	
27	Loss	20–7	Ezzard Charles	UD	10	Dec 1, 1942	Cleveland Arena, Cleveland, Ohio	
26	Loss	20–6	Ezzard Charles	UD	10	Oct 27, 1942	Duquesne Gardens, Pittsburgh, Pennsylvania	
25	Win	20–5	Larry Lane	PTS	10	Oct 13, 1942	Akron Armory, Akron, Ohio	
24	Win	19–5	Hubert Hood	UD	10	Oct 5, 1942	Marigold Gardens, Chicago, Illinois	
23	Win	18–5	Shelton Bell	PTS	10	Sep 22, 1942	Hickey Park, Millvale, Pennsylvania	
22	Win	17–5	Jack Marshall	KO	9	Aug 27, 1942	Comiskey Park, Chicago, Illinois	
21	Loss	16–5	Altus Allen	MD	10	Aug 10, 1942	Marigold Gardens, Chicago, Illinois	
20	Win	16–4	Curtis Sheppard	PTS	10	Jul 27, 1942	Forbes Field, Pittsburgh, Pennsylvania	
19	Win	15–4	Lou Brooks	SD	10	Jul 10, 1942	Wilmington Park, Wilmington, Delaware	
18	Loss	14–4	Jimmy Bivins	SD	10	Jun 23, 1942	Lakefront Stadium, Cleveland, Ohio	
17	Win	14–3	Charley Roth	KO	4	Jun 1, 1942	Marigold Gardens, Chicago, Illinois	
16	Loss	13–3	Charley Roth	DQ	2	May 11, 1942	Marigold Gardens, Chicago, Illinois	Maxim disqualified for hitting Roth while he was down.
15	Win	13–2	Frank Greene	KO	2	Apr 20, 1942	Marigold Gardens, Chicago, Illinois	
14	Win	12–2	Lou Brooks	SD	10	Mar 23, 1942	Baltimore Coliseum, Baltimore, Maryland	
13	Win	11–2	Herbie Katz	KO	6	Mar 11, 1942	Cleveland Arena, Cleveland, Ohio	
12	Loss	10–2	Booker Beckwith	UD	10	Jan 16, 1942	Chicago Coliseum, Chicago, Illinois	
11	Win	10–1	Red Burman	PTS	10	Dec 1, 1941	Cleveland Arena, Cleveland, Ohio	
10	Win	9–1	Oliver Shanks	KO	5	Oct 27, 1941	Marigold Gardens, Chicago, Illinois	
9	Win	8–1	Bill Petersen	UD	10	Oct 6, 1941	Marigold Gardens, Chicago, Illinois	
8	Win	7–1	Nate Bolden	UD	10	Sep 15, 1941	Marigold Gardens, Chicago, Illinois	
7	Win	6–1	Lee Oma	PTS	8	Aug 11, 1941	Marigold Gardens, Chicago, Illinois	
6	Win	5–1	Johnny Trotter	PTS	8	Jul 28, 1941	Marigold Gardens, Chicago, Illinois	
5	Win	4–1	Tony Paoli	PTS	10	Jul 11, 1941	Sportsman's Park, Cleveland, Ohio	
4	Win	3–1	Bobby Berry	PTS	6	Apr 29, 1941	Cleveland Arena, Cleveland, Ohio	
3	Loss	2–1	Orlando Trotter	SD	8	Feb 17, 1941	Marigold Gardens, Chicago, Illinois	
2	Win	2–0	Frank McBride	UD	8	Jan 27, 1941	Marigold Gardens, Chicago, Illinois	
1	Win	1–0	Bobby Berry	PTS	4	Jan 13, 1941	Cleveland Arena, Cleveland, Ohio	

== Titles in boxing ==
=== Major world titles ===
- NYSAC light heavyweight champion (175 lbs)
- NBA (WBA) light heavyweight champion (175 lbs)

=== The Ring magazine titles ===
- The Ring light heavyweight champion (175 lbs)

=== Regional/International titles ===
- U.S. light heavyweight champion (175 lbs)
- Pacific Northwest heavyweight champion (200+ lbs)

=== Undisputed titles ===
- Undisputed light heavyweight champion

== See also ==
- List of light heavyweight boxing champions

Achievements
Preceded by Freddie Mills	World Light Heavyweight Champion; January 24, 1950 – December 17, 1952	Succeeded by Archie Moore
