= Joe Louis vs. Billy Conn =

Boxing match

- Date: June 18, 1941
- Venue: Polo Grounds, New York City, New York, U.S.
- Title(s) on the line: NBA, NYSAC, and The Ring undisputed heavyweight championship

Tale of the tape
Boxer	Joe Louis	Billy Conn
Nickname	"The Brown Bomber"	"The Pittsburgh Kid"
Hometown	Detroit, Michigan, U.S.	Pittsburgh, Pennsylvania, U.S.
Pre-fight record	49–1 (41 KO)	59–9–1 (13 KO)
Age	27 years, 1 month	23 years, 8 months
Height	6 ft 1 1/2 in (187 cm)	6 ft 1 1/2 in (187 cm)
Weight	199 1/2 lb (90 kg)	174 lb (79 kg)
Style	Orthodox	Orthodox
Recognition	NBA, NYSAC and The Ring undisputed Heavyweight Champion	NBA; No. 2 Ranked Heavyweight; Former undisputed light heavyweight champion

Result
- Louis defeats Conn by 13th round KO

Joe Louis vs. Billy Conn was a professional boxing match contested on June 18, 1941, for the undisputed heavyweight championship.

== Background ==
Since his first round stoppage of former conqueror Max Schmeling in June 1938, Joe Louis had made a record 13 defences in a 29 month period from January 1939 to May 1941. However despite 5 of the 12 men he faced being ranked inside the top 10 when he fought them (and one being a reigning light heavyweight champion), this run of opponents would be disparagingly referred to as the "Bum of the Month Club", a term first used by New York Daily News sportswriter Jack Miley. In 1939, after Billy Conn won the light heavyweight title, he would write "Not so long ago a skinny middleweight, William David Conn is growing like a weed. Now he's a light-heavyweight, the champion of his class. When he cleans up on those boys-and it won't be long-he will pick on Bob Pastor and any of the heavyweights who stand in his way. They won't hit him enough to hurt him.... By 1941 Louis will be even more jaded from fighting all the bums. And Conn will astound with his fearlessness, his speed. Heigh-ho, it is written in the cards, mates."

On 21 December 1940, Louis signed to face Conn in June 1941 with the date and venue to be confirmed. On 2 May, promoter Mike Jacobs confirmed that the bout would take on 18 June at the Polo Grounds, New York City, as long as Louis defeated Buddy Baer on 23 May, which he did via a disqualification. Conn would vacate the light heavyweight title on 5 June.

A week before the bout, Conn defeated Louis to win The Ring magazine Fighter of the Year, with the magazine's editor/publisher Nat Fleischer presenting the plaque at the challenger's training camp at Pompton Lakes, New Jersey. Speaking about the upcoming bout, Conn and his manager Johnny Ray expressed confidence saying "All right, laugh if you want to, but we're more confident than ever now that Joe won't be around when the bell goes off for the 15th round. There just won't be any bell, because it'll be all over by then. If I didn't think so, what would I be doing way out here in the woods? I don't like It out here. It's too quiet and there's nothing to do. Give me New York or Pittsburgh. I'd rather work in the gym." Conn also say during the build up that he would not gain weight for the bout, instead saying that he would rely on a "hit and run" strategy.

Louis was a 5–2 favourite to win.

== The fight ==
The 54,487 people in the Polo Grounds witnessed a classic puncher vs boxer match up. After a cautious opening couple of rounds, Conn found his rhythm and outboxed the champion, landing frequently with his left hook, with Louis looking unusually slow and lethargic. Louis hurt Conn with a left hook of his own to the jaw in the 5th round but the challenger was able to avoid the champion's follow up attacks. Conn would continue to control the action, with Louis only coming to life in the 10th, landing a hard left to midsection of Conn. Late on in the 12th round, a pair of swinging left hooks to the jaw of Louis, staggered the champion, who fell back on to the ropes as the crowd roared. Despite clearly being ahead in the fight Conn appearing to begin the 13th looking for a knockout. Louis had been told by his trainer Jack Blackburn that he needed a knockout to win. About a minute into the round Louis moved under a left hook to land a left hook followed by a right that hurt Conn. Louis followed up, landing repeated rights before finally dropping Conn late into the round. Conn failed to beat referee Eddie Joseph's count giving Louis a knockout victory.

At the time of the stoppage Conn led on two of three scorecards, 7–5, 7–4–1 with third 6–6. The Associated Press had it 8–4 for Conn.

== Aftermath ==
Speaking in his dressing room after the bout Louis explained that he knew he was "...far behind and had to knock the boy out. I didn't know I had him till I actually knocked him out. He knows how to take care of himself in the ring better'n anyone I ever fought. Then, when he started punchin' me around, I figured he'd start to gamble. And he did. In the 13th, he threw a right and left hook, that way, so I straightened him up with my hook and caught him with the right." In his own dressing Conn told the press "I don't remember any particular wallop in that 13th. All I know is there was a helluva lot of 'em. I wanna meet that guy again."

The two were set for a rematch on 25 June 1942 before Conn broke his left hand. It was rearranged for 12 October, however it was cancelled by the order of Secretary of War Henry L. Stimson on September 25. It was eventually held on June 19, 1946, with Louis again stopping Conn.

Writing in his autobiography, Joe Louis admitted that he underestimated Conn and that he deliberately overtrained to weigh in under 200 Ibs, saying:

"I was upset when I found out that Conn was going to weigh in at less than 175 pounds. At that time I was generally coming in at 200, 202, and I always used to lay off a day before the fight with just a little roadwork to break sweat and a shower and a rubdown-no boxing. Really wanted to break 200 because I didn't want the public saying-"Joe Louis, 202, and Conn, 170." This would make me feel like I was a bully taking advantage of a smaller man. So, the last day I trained like I always did. Chapple was mad as hell. I dieted and drank as little water as possible. Anyway, I'd broken 200 and came in at 199 1/2 pounds. Conn was at 174. But I made it to the weigh-in without any breakfast; I felt like shit. I had no pep, and as soon as I got to 555 Edgecombe Avenue, my chef, Bill Bottoms, had a good meal ready for me. Steak, black-eyed peas, and salad. He knew I needed pumping up.

Conn would later reflect that "I was a wise guy. I had him and I let him get away. If I hadn't hurt him in the twelfth and tried to knock him out in the thirteenth, I'd have beat him. If the bell had saved me in the thirteenth, I'd have wised up and never have let him hit me again. I'd still have won. But I made a mistake and I paid for it" before adding with a laugh "I'm just too Irish and too cocky for my own good.".

The 1996 holiday issue of The Ring selected the bout as the 6th greatest title fight of all time and the 4th greatest heavyweight title bout.

== Undercard ==
Confirmed bouts:

Preceded by vs. Buddy Baer	Joe Louis's bouts 18 June 1941	Succeeded by vs. Lou Nova
Preceded by vs. Buddy Knox	Billy Conn's bouts 18 June 1941	Succeeded by vs. Henry Cooper
