= Billy Conn =

American boxer (1917–1993)

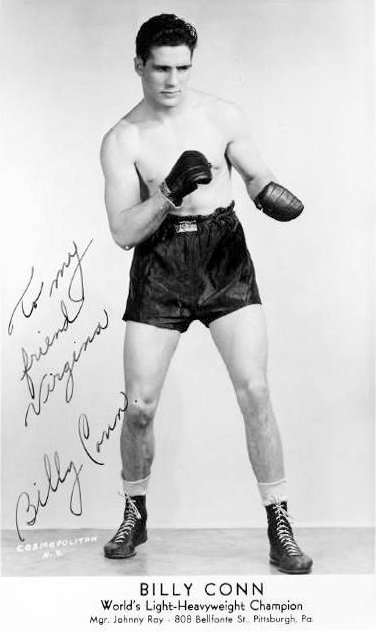

Personal information
- Nickname: The Pittsburgh Kid
- Born: William David Conn; October 8, 1917 Pittsburgh, Pennsylvania, U.S.
- Died: May 29, 1993 (aged 75) Pittsburgh, Pennsylvania, U.S.
- Height: 6 ft 1 1/2 in (187 cm)
- Weight: Light Heavyweight Heavyweight

Boxing career
- Reach: 72 1/2 in (184 cm)
- Stance: Orthodox

Boxing record
- Total fights: 76
- Wins: 64
- Win by KO: 15
- Losses: 11
- Draws: 1

William David Conn (October 8, 1917 – May 29, 1993) was an American professional boxer and Light Heavyweight Champion famed for his fights with Joe Louis. He had a professional boxing record of 63 wins, 11 losses and 1 draw, with 14 wins by knockout. His nickname, throughout most of his career, was "The Pittsburgh Kid." He was inducted into the International Boxing Hall of Fame in the inaugural class of 1990.

== Early career ==
Conn debuted as a professional boxer winning on July 20, 1934, against Johnny Lewis, via a knockout in round three.

Conn built a record of 47 wins, 9 losses and 1 draw (tie), with 7 knockouts, before challenging for the world Light Heavyweight title. Along the way, he beat former or future world champions Fritzie Zivic, Solly Krieger and Fred Apostoli, as well as Teddy Yarosz and Young Corbett III.

On July 13, 1939, he won the world light heavyweight championship by outpointing Melio Bettina in New York. Conn defended his title against Bettina and twice against another World Light Heavyweight Champion, Gus Lesnevich, winning each in 15-round decisions. Conn also beat former World Middleweight Champion Al McCoy and heavyweights Bob Pastor, Lee Savold, Gunnar Barlund and Buddy Knox in non-title bouts during his run as World Light Heavyweight Champion.

== Joe Louis Era ==
In May 1941, Conn gave up his World Light Heavyweight title to challenge World Heavyweight Champion Joe Louis. Conn attempted to become the first World Light Heavyweight Champion in boxing history to win the World Heavyweight Championship when he and Louis met on June 18 of that year, and incredibly, to do so without going up in weight. The fight became part of boxing's lore because Conn held a secure lead on the scorecards leading to round 13. According to many experts and fans who watched the fight, Conn was outmaneuvering Louis up to that point. In a move that Conn would regret for the rest of his life, he tried to go for the knockout in round 13, and instead wound up losing the fight by knockout in that same round himself. Ten minutes after the fight, Conn told reporters, "I lost my head and a million bucks." When asked by a reporter why he went for the knockout, Conn replied famously, "What's the use of being Irish if you can't be thick [i.e. stupid]?" In his long account in Sports Illustrated of the life and boxing career of Conn, sportswriter Frank Deford wrote that afterwards Conn would joke, "I told Joe later, 'Hey, Joe, why didn't you just let me have the title for six months?' All I ever wanted was to be able to go around the corner where the guys are loafing and say, 'Hey, I'm the heavyweight champeen of the world.' "And you know what Joe said back to me? He said, 'I let you have it for twelve rounds, and you couldn't keep it. How could I let you have it for six months?'"

In 1942, Conn beat Tony Zale and had an exhibition with Louis. World War II was at one of its most important moments, however, and both Conn and Louis were called to serve in the Army. Conn went to war and was away from the ring until 1946.

By then, the public was clamoring for a rematch between him and the still World Heavyweight Champion Louis. This happened, and on June 19, 1946, Conn returned into the ring, straight into a World Heavyweight Championship bout. Before that fight, it was suggested to Louis that Conn might outpoint him because of his hand and foot speed. In a line that would be long-remembered, Louis replied: "He can run, but he can't hide." The fight, at Yankee Stadium, was the first televised World Heavyweight Championship bout ever, and 146,000 people watched it on TV, also setting a record for the most seen world heavyweight bout in history. Most people who saw it agreed that both Conn and Louis' abilities had eroded with their time spent serving in the armed forces, but Louis was able to retain the crown by a knockout in round eight. Conn's career was basically over after this fight, but he still fought two more fights, winning both by knockout in round nine. On December 10, 1948, he and Louis met inside a ring for the last time, this time for a public exhibition in Chicago. Conn would never climb into a ring as a fighter again.

== Personal life ==
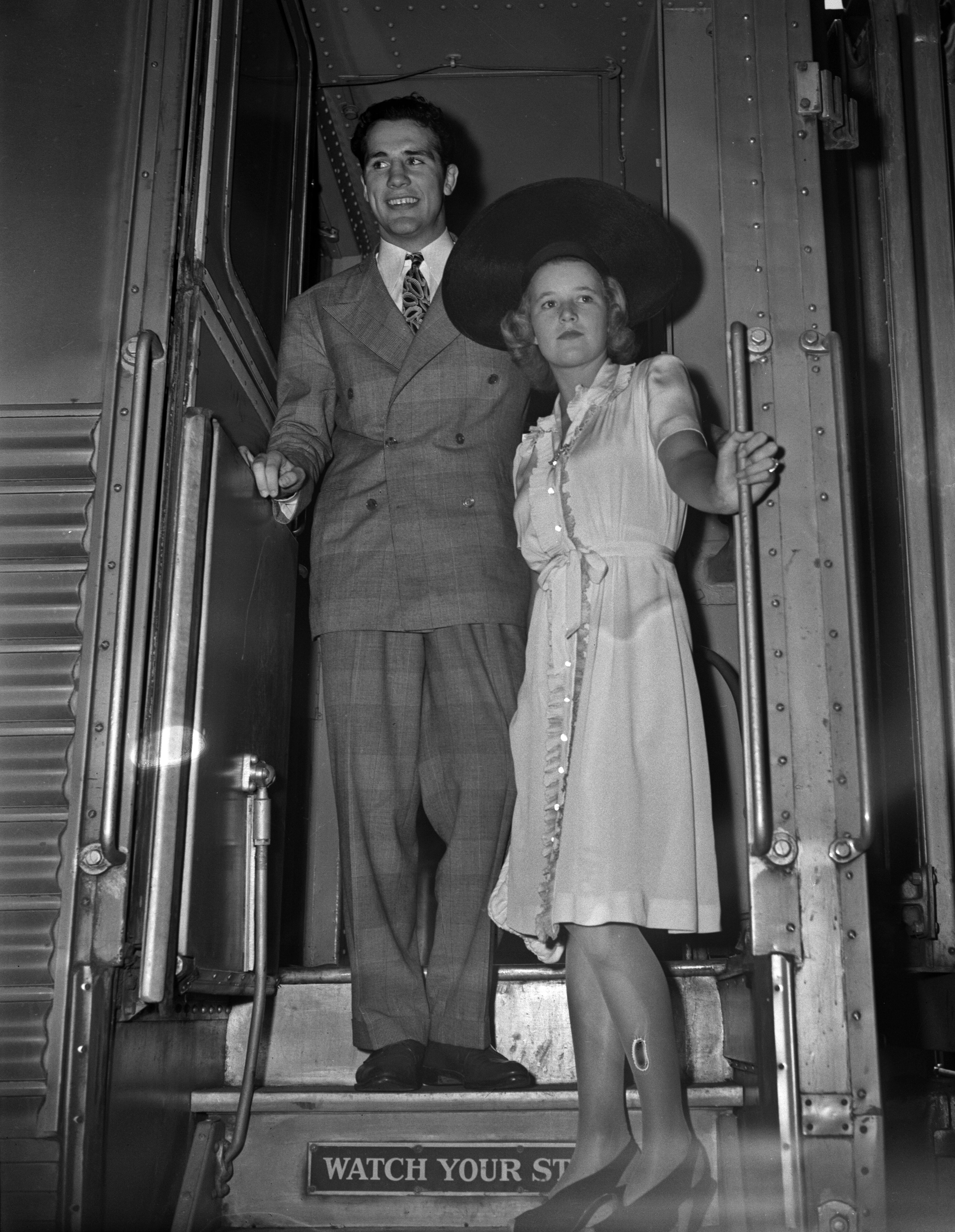
Conn and his wife Mary Louise, 1941

Billy married Mary Louise Smith, also from Pittsburgh. Billy did not get along with Mary's father, former major league baseball player for the Cincinnati Reds, Jimmy "Greenfield Jimmie" Smith. A fight broke out between them and Conn punched his father-in-law in the head and broke his hand, resulting in postponing his rematch with Joe Louis. Frank Deford wrote colorfully about the kitchen brawl in his Sports Illustrated story "The Boxer and the Blonde".

== Retirement ==
Conn appeared in a 1941 movie called The Pittsburgh Kid. He maintained his boxing skills into his later years, and at 73 years old, he stepped into the middle of a robbery at a Pittsburgh convenience store in 1990 after the robber punched the store manager. Conn took a swing at the robber and ended up on the floor of the store, scuffling with him. "You always go with your best punch—straight left," Conn told television station WTAE afterward. "I think I interrupted his plans." The robber managed to get away, but not before Conn pulled off his coat, which contained his name and address, making the arrest an easy one. His wife said jumping into the fray was typical of her husband. "My instinct was to get help," she said at the time. "Billy's instinct was to fight."

Conn was a great friend of Pittsburgh Steelers owner Art Rooney.

As he became an older citizen, he participated in a number of documentaries for HBO and was frequently seen at boxing-related activities until his death in 1993, at the age of 75.

Conn was inducted into the International Boxing Hall of Fame in Canastota, New York.

In April 2017 Mary Louise Conn died, at 94.

== In popular culture ==
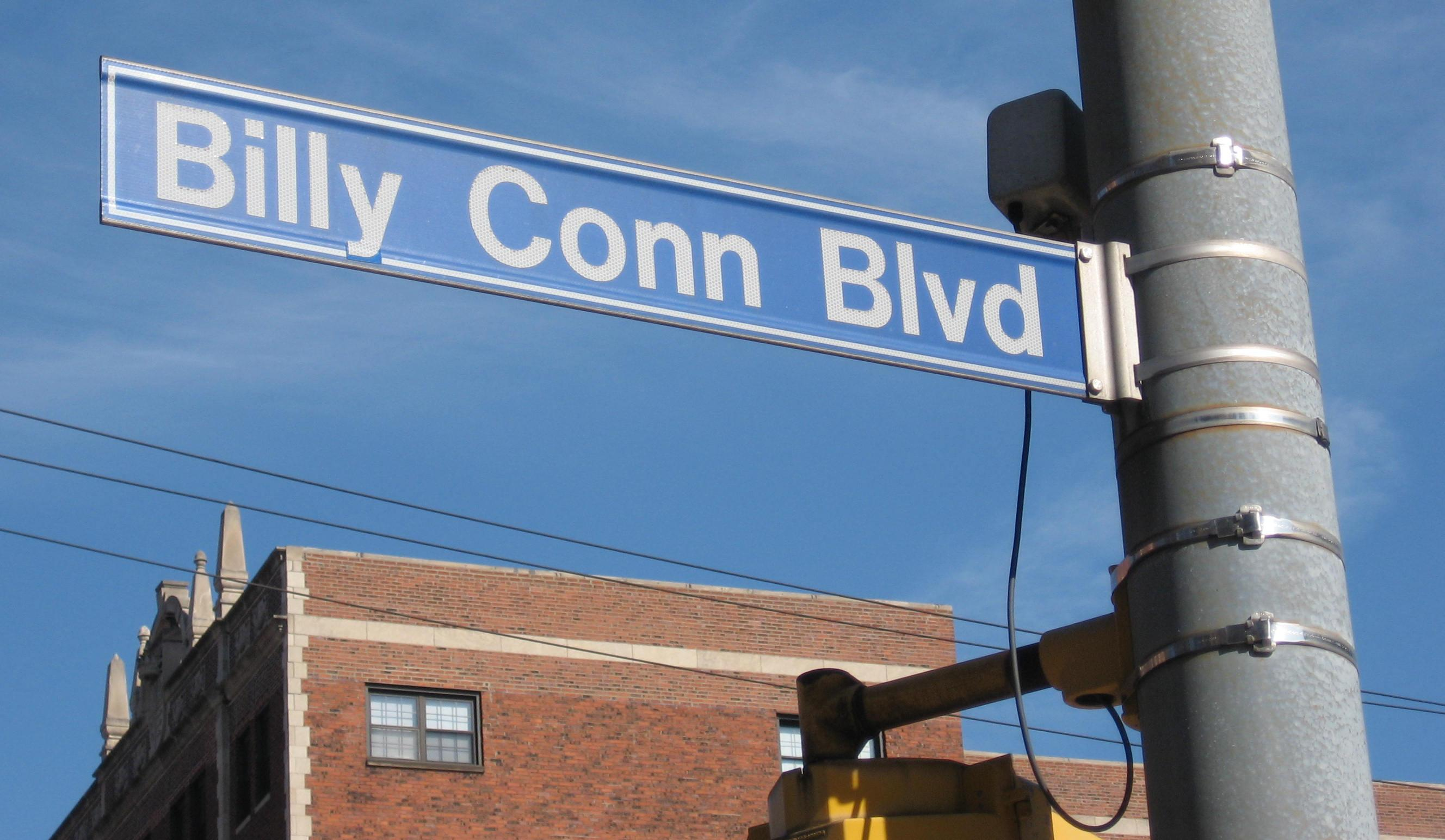
Billy Conn Boulevard in Pittsburgh, PA

- A portion of North Craig Street in the Oakland neighborhood of Pittsburgh is named Billy Conn Boulevard.
- Billy Conn is mentioned in the classic movie On the Waterfront. In the famous scene in the back of the cab—"I could have been a contender." Rod Steiger (playing Marlon Brando's brother) reflects on Brando's character Terry's early promise as a boxer with the words "You could have been another Billy Conn."
- Billy Conn is also mentioned in the 1966 Jack Lemmon and Walter Matthau classic comedy movie The Fortune Cookie. In the apartment scene where Lemmon asks Boom Boom (Ron Rich) "Where'd you learn that? Don't tell me, your father was a Pullman porter", for which Boom Boom replies "He was a fighter, light heavyweight. Once went rounds with Billy Conn."
- Conn played a character named Billy Conn in the 1941 film The Pittsburgh Kid, although it was not a biography.

== Professional boxing record ==
| 76 fights | 64 wins | 11 losses |
|---|---|---|
| By knockout | 15 | 3 |
| By decision | 49 | 8 |
| Draws | 1 | |

| No. | Result | Record | Opponent | Type | Round | Date | Location | Notes |
|---|---|---|---|---|---|---|---|---|
| 76 | Win | 64–11–1 | Jackie Lyons | KO | 9 (10) | Nov 25, 1948 | Sportatorium, Dallas, Texas, U.S. | |
| 75 | Win | 63–11–1 | Mike O'Dowd | TKO | 9 (10) | Nov 15, 1948 | Macon, Georgia, U.S. | |
| 74 | Loss | 62–11–1 | Joe Louis | KO | 8 (15) | Jun 19, 1946 | Yankee Stadium, Bronx, New York City, New York, U.S. | For NYSAC, NBA, and The Ring heavyweight titles |
| 73 | Win | 62–10–1 | Tony Zale | UD | 12 | Feb 13, 1942 | Madison Square Garden, New York City, New York, U.S. | |
| 72 | Win | 61–10–1 | Jay D Turner | UD | 10 | Jan 28, 1942 | Municipal Auditorium, Saint Louis, Missouri, U.S. | |
| 71 | Win | 60–10–1 | Henry Cooper | UD | 12 | Jan 12, 1942 | Polo Grounds, New York City, New York, U.S. | |
| 70 | Loss | 59–10–1 | Joe Louis | KO | 13 (15), 2:58 | Jun 18, 1941 | Polo Grounds, New York City, New York, U.S. | For NYSAC, NBA, and The Ring heavyweight titles |
| 69 | Win | 59–9–1 | Buddy Knox | TKO | 8 (10) | May 26, 1941 | Forbes Field, Pittsburgh, Pennsylvania, U.S. | |
| 68 | Win | 58–9–1 | Gunnar Bärlund | TKO | 8 (10) | April 4, 1941 | Chicago Stadium, Chicago, Illinois, U.S. | |
| 67 | Win | 57–9–1 | Danny Hassett | KO | 5 (15) | Mar 5, 1941 | Uline Arena, Washington, D.C., U.S. | |
| 66 | Win | 56–9–1 | Ira Hughes | TKO | 4 (10) | Feb 27, 1941 | Clarksburg, West Virginia, U.S. | |
| 65 | Win | 55–9–1 | Lee Savold | UD | 10 | Nov 29, 1940 | Madison Square Garden, New York City, New York, U.S. | |
| 64 | Win | 54–9–1 | Al McCoy | UD | 10 | Oct 18, 1940 | Boston Garden, Boston, Massachusetts, U.S. | Not to be confused with Al McCoy |
| 63 | Win | 53–9–1 | Bob Pastor | KO | 13 (15) | Sep 6, 1940 | Madison Square Garden, New York City, New York, U.S. | |
| 62 | Win | 52–9–1 | Gus Lesnevich | UD | 15 | Jun 5, 1940 | Olympia Stadium, Detroit, Michigan, U.S. | Retained NYSAC, NBA, and The Ring light heavyweight titles |
| 61 | Win | 51–9–1 | Henry Cooper | UD | 12 | Jan 10, 1940 | Madison Square Garden, New York City, New York, U.S. | |
| 60 | Win | 50–9–1 | Gus Lesnevich | UD | 15 | Nov 17, 1939 | Madison Square Garden, New York City, New York, U.S. | Retained NYSAC, NBA, and The Ring light heavyweight titles |
| 59 | Win | 49–9–1 | Melio Bettina | UD | 15 | Sep 25, 1939 | Forbes Field, Pittsburgh, Pennsylvania, U.S. | Retained NYSAC, NBA, and The Ring light heavyweight titles |
| 58 | Win | 48–9–1 | Gus Dorazio | TKO | 8 (10) | Aug 14, 1939 | Shibe Park, Philadelphia, Pennsylvania, U.S. | |
| 57 | Win | 47–9–1 | Melio Bettina | UD | 15 | Jul 15, 1939 | Madison Square Garden, New York City, New York, U.S. | Won NYSAC, vacant NBA and The Ring light heavyweight titles |
| 56 | Win | 46–9–1 | Solly Krieger | UD | 12 | May 12, 1939 | Madison Square Garden, New York City, New York, U.S. | |
| 55 | Win | 45–9–1 | Fred Apostoli | UD | 15 | Feb 10, 1939 | Madison Square Garden, New York City, New York, U.S. | |
| 54 | Win | 44–9–1 | Fred Apostoli | UD | 10 | Jan 6, 1939 | Madison Square Garden, New York City, New York, U.S. | |
| 53 | Win | 43–9–1 | Solly Krieger | UD | 12 | Nov 28, 1938 | Duquesne Garden, Pittsburgh, Pennsylvania, U.S. | |
| 52 | Win | 42–9–1 | Honeyboy Jones | PTS | 10 | Oct 27, 1938 | Duquesne Garden, Pittsburgh, Pennsylvania, U.S. | |
| 51 | Win | 41–9–1 | Ray Actis | TKO | 8 (10) | Sep 14, 1938 | Civic Auditorium, San Francisco, California, U.S. | |
| 50 | Loss | 40–9–1 | Teddy Yarosz | UD | 12 | Jul 25, 1938 | Forbes Field, Pittsburgh, Pennsylvania, U.S. | |
| 49 | Win | 40–8–1 | Eric Seelig | MD | 10 | May 10, 1938 | Motor Square Garden, Pittsburgh, Pennsylvania, U.S. | |
| 48 | Win | 39–8–1 | Domenico Ceccarelli | PTS | 10 | April 4, 1938 | Motor Square Garden, Pittsburgh, Pennsylvania, U.S. | |
| 47 | Win | 38–8–1 | Honeyboy Jones | PTS | 12 | Jan 24, 1938 | Motor Square Garden, Pittsburgh, Pennsylvania, U.S. | |
| 46 | Loss | 37–8–1 | Solly Krieger | UD | 12 | Dec 16, 1937 | Duquesne Garden, Pittsburgh, Pennsylvania, U.S. | |
| 45 | Win | 37–7–1 | Young Corbett III | UD | 10 | Nov 8, 1937 | Duquesne Garden, Pittsburgh, Pennsylvania, U.S. | |
| 44 | Win | 36–7–1 | Teddy Yarosz | SD | 15 | Sep 30, 1937 | Duquesne Garden, Pittsburgh, Pennsylvania, U.S. | |
| 43 | Loss | 35–7–1 | Young Corbett III | PTS | 10 | Aug 13, 1937 | Dreamland Auditorium, San Francisco, California, U.S. | |
| 42 | Win | 35–6–1 | Ralph Chong | RTD | 5 (10) | Aug 3, 1937 | Idora Park, Youngstown, Ohio, U.S. | |
| 41 | Win | 34–6–1 | Teddy Yarosz | SD | 12 | Jun 30, 1937 | Forbes Field, Pittsburgh, Pennsylvania, U.S. | |
| 40 | Win | 33–6–1 | Oscar Rankins | SD | 10 | May 27, 1937 | Duquesne Garden, Pittsburgh, Pennsylvania, U.S. | |
| 39 | Win | 32–6–1 | Vince Dundee | UD | 10 | May 3, 1937 | Duquesne Garden, Pittsburgh, Pennsylvania, U.S. | |
| 38 | Win | 31–6–1 | Eddie Babe Risko | UD | 10 | Mar 11, 1937 | Duquesne Garden, Pittsburgh, Pennsylvania, U.S. | |
| 37 | Win | 30–6–1 | Fritzie Zivic | SD | 10 | Dec 28, 1936 | Duquesne Garden, Pittsburgh, Pennsylvania, U.S. | |
| 36 | Win | 29–6–1 | Jimmy Brown | TKO | 9 (10) | Dec 2, 1936 | Motor Square Garden, Pittsburgh, Pennsylvania, U.S. | |
| 35 | Win | 28–6–1 | Ralph Chong | UD | 8 | Oct 22, 1936 | Duquesne Garden, Pittsburgh, Pennsylvania, U.S. | |
| 34 | Win | 27–6–1 | Charley Weise | UD | 10 | Oct 19, 1936 | Islam Grotto, Pittsburgh, Pennsylvania, U.S. | |
| 33 | Win | 26–6–1 | Roscoe Manning | TKO | 5 (10) | Sep 21, 1936 | Forbes Field, Pittsburgh, Pennsylvania, U.S. | |
| 32 | Win | 25–6–1 | Honeyboy Jones | SD | 10 | Sep 8, 1936 | Hickey Park, Millvale, Pennsylvania, U.S. | |
| 31 | Win | 24–6–1 | Teddy Movan | UD | 8 | Aug 10, 1936 | Hickey Park, Millvale, Pennsylvania, U.S. | |
| 30 | Win | 23–6–1 | Teddy Movan | UD | 8 | Jul 30, 1936 | Forbes Field, Pittsburgh, Pennsylvania, U.S. | |
| 29 | Win | 22–6–1 | General Burrows | UD | 8 | Jun 15, 1936 | Hickey Park, Millvale, Pennsylvania, U.S. | |
| 28 | Win | 21–6–1 | Honeyboy Jones | PTS | 10 | Jun 3, 1936 | Greenlee Field, Pittsburgh, Pennsylvania, U.S. | |
| 27 | Win | 20–6–1 | Honeyboy Jones | UD | 8 | May 27, 1936 | Greenlee Field, Pittsburgh, Pennsylvania, U.S. | |
| 26 | Win | 19–6–1 | Dick Ambrose | SD | 6 | May 19, 1936 | Hickey Park, Millvale, Pennsylvania, U.S. | |
| 25 | Win | 18–6–1 | General Burrows | PTS | 6 | April 27, 1936 | Moose Lodge, Pittsburgh, Pennsylvania, U.S. | |
| 24 | Win | 17–6–1 | Steve Nickleash | UD | 6 | April 13, 1936 | Moose Lodge, Pittsburgh, Pennsylvania, U.S. | |
| 23 | Win | 16–6–1 | Steve Nickleash | UD | 6 | Mar 16, 1936 | Northside Arena, Pittsburgh, Pennsylvania, U.S. | |
| 22 | Win | 15–6–1 | Louis Cook | UD | 8 | Feb 17, 1936 | Northside Arena, Pittsburgh, Pennsylvania, U.S. | |
| 21 | Win | 14–6–1 | Louis Cook | UD | 6 | Feb 3, 1936 | Northside Arena, Pittsburgh, Pennsylvania, U.S. | |
| 20 | Win | 13–6–1 | Johnny Yurcini | TKO | 4 (6) | Jan 27, 1936 | Northside Arena, Pittsburgh, Pennsylvania, U.S. | |
| 19 | Win | 12–6–1 | Steve Walters | PTS | 6 | Nov 18, 1935 | Northside Arena, Pittsburgh, Pennsylvania, U.S. | |
| 18 | Draw | 11–6–1 | Teddy Movan | PTS | 6 | Oct 14, 1935 | Motor Square Garden, Pittsburgh, Pennsylvania, U.S. | |
| 17 | Win | 11–6 | Johnny Yurcini | PTS | 6 | Oct 7, 1935 | Johnstown, Pennsylvania, U.S. | |
| 16 | Win | 10–6 | Johnny Yurcini | PTS | 6 | Sep 10, 1935 | Washington, Pennsylvania, U.S. | |
| 15 | Win | 9–6 | George Liggins | UD | 4 | Sep 9, 1935 | Duquesne Garden, Pittsburgh, Pennsylvania, U.S. | |
| 14 | Loss | 8–6 | Teddy Movan | SD | 4 | Aug 19, 1935 | Hickey Park, Millvale, Pennsylvania, U.S. | |
| 13 | Win | 8–5 | Ray Eberle | UD | 5 | Jul 29, 1935 | Hickey Park, Millvale, Pennsylvania, U.S. | |
| 12 | Loss | 7–5 | Teddy Movan | PTS | 4 | Jul 9, 1935 | Hickey Park, Millvale, Pennsylvania, U.S. | |
| 11 | Loss | 7–4 | Ralph Gizzy | PTS | 6 | Jun 10, 1935 | Hickey Park, Millvale, Pennsylvania, U.S. | |
| 10 | Win | 7–3 | Ray Eberle | SD | 6 | Jun 3, 1935 | Hickey Park, Millvale, Pennsylvania, U.S. | |
| 9 | Loss | 6–3 | Ralph Gizzy | UD | 4 | April 25, 1935 | Motor Square Garden, Pittsburgh, Pennsylvania, U.S. | |
| 8 | Win | 6–2 | George Schlie | KO | 2 (6) | April 8, 1935 | Moose Lodge, Pittsburgh, Pennsylvania, U.S. | |
| 7 | Win | 5–2 | Stanley Nagy | PTS | 4 | Mar 13, 1935 | Wheeling, West Virginia, U.S. | |
| 6 | Loss | 4–2 | Ray Eberle | PTS | 6 | Feb 25, 1935 | Moose Lodge, Pittsburgh, Pennsylvania, U.S. | |
| 5 | Win | 4–1 | Johnny Birek | SD | 6 | Jan 29, 1935 | Motor Square Garden, Pittsburgh, Pennsylvania, U.S. | |
| 4 | Loss | 3–1 | Pete Leone | RTD | 3 (6) | Nov 12, 1934 | Wheeling, West Virginia, U.S. | |
| 3 | Win | 3–0 | Paddy Gray | PTS | 4 | Sep 27, 1934 | Northside Arena, Pittsburgh, Pennsylvania, U.S. | |
| 2 | Win | 2–0 | Bob Dorman | PTS | 6 | Aug 30, 1934 | Parkersburg, West Virginia, U.S. | |
| 1 | Win | 1–0 | Johnny Lewis | KO | 3 (6) | Jul 20, 1934 | Valley Bell Park, Charleston, West Virginia, U.S. | |

== Titles in boxing ==
=== Major world titles ===
- NYSAC light heavyweight champion (175 lbs)
- NBA (WBA) light heavyweight champion (175 lbs)

=== The Ring magazine titles ===
- The Ring light heavyweight champion (175 lbs)

=== Undisputed titles ===
- Undisputed light heavyweight champion

== See also ==
- List of light heavyweight boxing champions

Achievements
| Vacant Title last held by John Henry Lewis | NBA Light Heavyweight Champion; July 13, 1939 – June 5, 1940; Vacated | Succeeded by Anton Christoforidis |
| Vacant Title last held by John Henry Lewis | World Light Heavyweight Champion; July 13, 1939 – June 5, 1940; Vacated | Succeeded by Gus Lesnevich |
| Preceded by Melio Bettina | NYSAC Light Heavyweight Champion; July 13, 1939 - June 5, 1940; Vacated | Succeeded by Gus Lesnevich |
