= Mechanics Building =

- Mechanics Building/Masonic Building
- U.S. National Register of Historic Places

- Location within Colorado Location within the United States
- Location: 207-211 N. Main St., Pueblo, Colorado
- Coordinates: 38°16′9″N 104°36′30″W
- Area: 0.1 acres (0.040 ha)
- Built: 1891
- Architect: Francis W. Cooper
- Architectural style: Late Victorian
- NRHP reference No.: 83001330
- Added to NRHP: June 16, 1983

The Mechanics Building (also known as the Masonic Building) in Pueblo, Colorado was built in 1891 in Late Victorian style. It was listed on the National Register of Historic Places in 1983.

== Description and history ==
The building was originally constructed 1890-91 as a commercial office building, with the Mechanics Savings Bank as its main tenant. It was purchased in 1910 by a local Masonic Lodge. The lodge converted some of the space as a meeting hall, and continued to rent the rest as commercial space. The Masons sold the building to The American Furniture Company in 1946, who have been its primary tenant since.
