= Russell Scott (boxer) =

Professional boxer

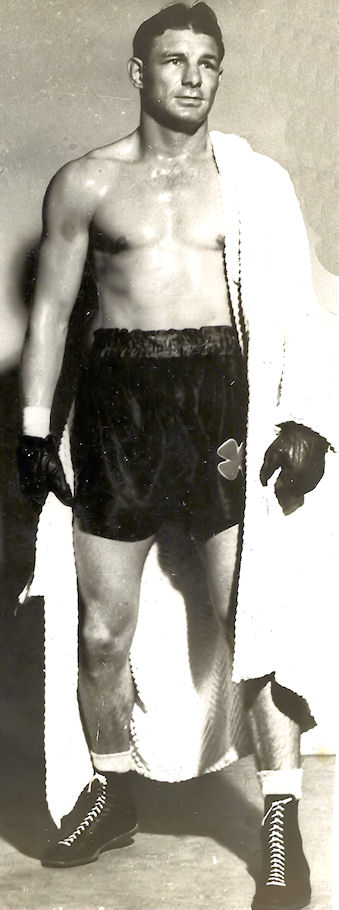
Buddy Scott

Russell Scott (March 27, 1917 – January 20, 1980), better known as Buddy Scott, was an American heavyweight professional boxer.

Russell Scott was born on March 27, 1917, in Electra, Texas. He was 5 feet, 11 inches tall and weighed 180 lbs. His boxing record is won 114 (KO 61) + lost 31 (KO 6) and drawn 6 = 151 rounds boxed 1112 KO% 40.4. Russell Scott is the younger brother of lightweight boxer Howard Scott. Most of Russell Scott's losses were at the end of his career. His death came on January 20, 1980, about 28 years after he retired from boxing. He was married three times, first to Geraldine Nichols, and then to Helen Green and last to Betty Brown. Russell had three daughters and one son. He went to George Washington University on an American football scholarship.
