= Melio Bettina =

American boxer (1916–1996)

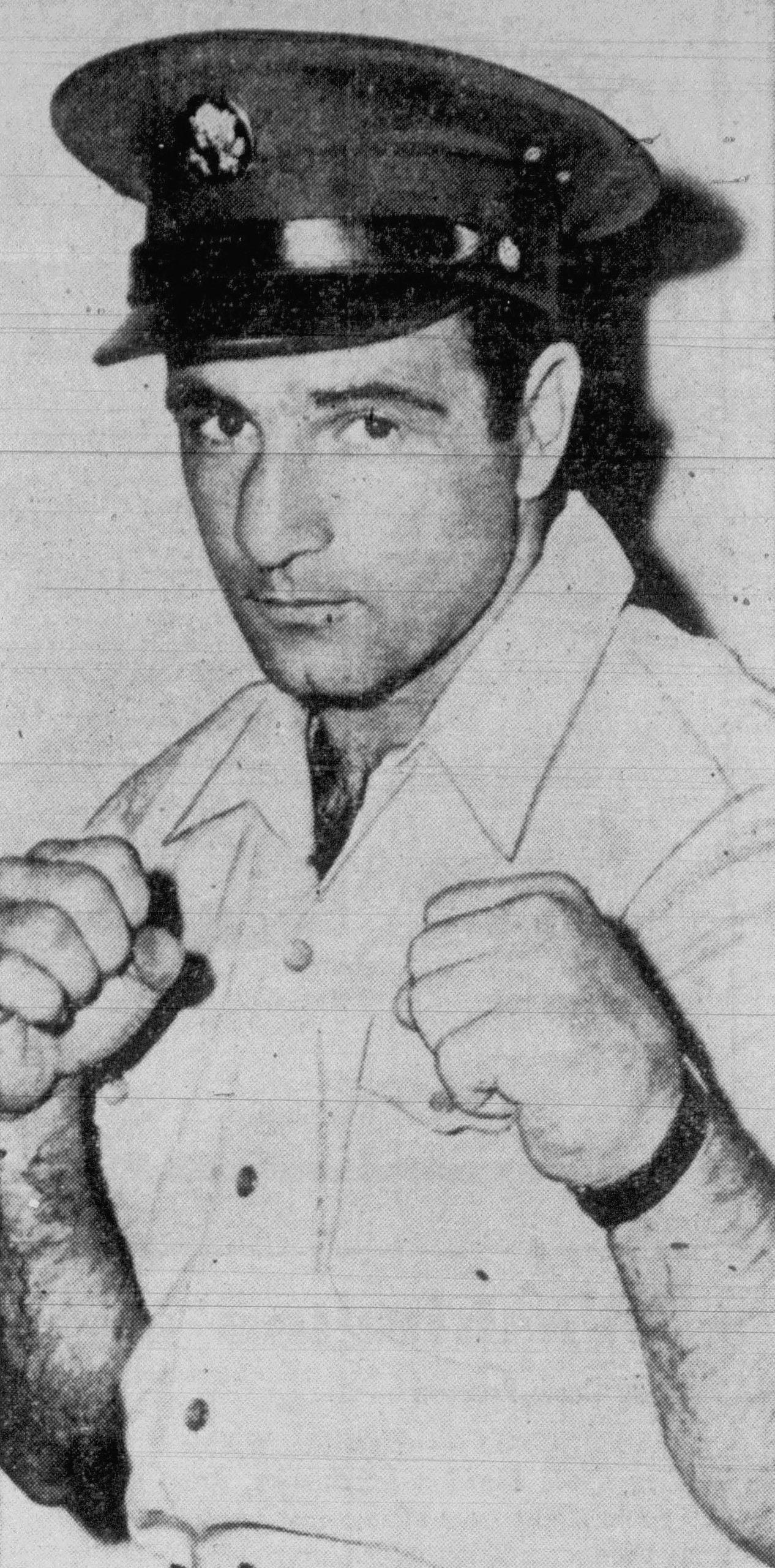
Bettina, circa 1942

Melio Bettina (November 18, 1916 – December 20, 1996) was an American boxer who was the Light Heavyweight World Champion.

== Amateur career ==
Bettina won the 1934 Intercity Golden Gloves at light-heavyweight (2nd Div.) by decision over Tony Zale.

== Pro career ==
According to local legend Melio changed to a southpaw stance after he couldn't find any amateur challengers. Bettina was recognized as World Light Heavyweight champion by the New York State Athletic Commission in 1939. Bettina won the title on February 3, 1939, when he scored a 9th-round TKO over favorite Tiger Jack Fox at Madison Square Garden in New York. Bettina lost the title in his first defense, when he lost a unanimous decision to National Boxing Association champion Billy Conn on July 13. Later that same year, on September 25, he lost another unanimous decision to Conn at Pittsburgh's Forbes Field.

In 1940, he lost a decision to Middleweight champion Fred Apostoli, which he would revenge by stopping Apostoli in the 12th round. Other highlights in 1940 included a loss to Al McCoy, and wins over Solly Krieger and Gunnar Barlund. On January 14, 1941, Bettina faced Anton Christoforidis for the vacant National Boxing Association Light Heavyweight title in Cleveland, Ohio. Christoforidis won a unanimous decision.

== Legacy ==
In 1996, Bettina was inducted into the World Boxing Hall Of Fame in Los Angeles. In 1998, he was inducted into the High School Athletic Hall of Fame in his hometown of Beacon, New York.

Achievements
Preceded by John Henry Lewis; Vacated	NYSAC light heavyweight champion February 03, 1939 – July 13, 1939	Succeeded by Billy Conn
