= Babe Culnan =

American boxing and wrestling promoter (1910-1984)

- Born: Thomas Joseph Culnan; 1897; Albany, New York, U.S.
- Died: November 11, 1962 (aged 64–65); Belleville, New Jersey, U.S.
- Other name: "Babe"
- Occupations: Sports promoter Boxing manager Matchmaker

Thomas Joseph "Babe" Culnan (1897 – November 11, 1962) was an American boxing and wrestling promoter for more than four decades, operating largely out of Newark, New Jersey.

== Early life ==
Born in the late 1890s, Thomas Joseph Culnan was raised in Albany, New York, United States.

== Career ==
Culnan entered the fight business in his hometown of Albany. He relocated to New Jersey in 1917, around the time the Frawley Law was repealed in New York.

After arriving in Newark, Culnan joined the "National Sportsmen's Club," formed to promote fights in the city, including the Newark Armory, during the "golden twenties." His partners, J. Frank Black, Harry Blaufuss, and Nick Kline, were called the Four Horsemen by the sports editor Francis Albertanti. Babe Culnan served as the matchmaker.

He promoted Luis Firpo's first fight in America in 1922 in Newark. He also promoted Firpo's last fight in the country against Charley Weinert, whom he had earlier managed in a bout with Gene Tunney.

Babe Culnan outmaneuvered Tex Rickard to take control of the 1924 Young Stribling–Mike McTigue rematch and hosted it in Newark. He notably matched Jack Dempsey and Harry Wills who signed contracts for a heavyweight title fight in September 1925 that never materialized.

In 1927, Culnan also worked as a matchmaker at the Halsey Street Arena, located between Court and Marshall streets in Newark.

He joined forces with Willie Gilzenberg in 1932. Their first success was taking over management of Red Cochrane and guiding him to the welterweight championship. Culnan and Gilzenberg wore the hats of matchmakers, managers, promoters, and even publicists. Their main venues were the Laurel Garden Arena and Dreamland Park. Culnan briefly served as a matchmaker at the Nutley Velodrome and Market St. Arena in 1935.

In 1938, Culnan, Gilzenberg, and Bill Patterson became partners in the Meadowbrook Bowl Corp. and built Meadowbrook Bowl to supplement their indoor arena at Laurel Garden. Culnan's last championship fight promotion was the 1941 Red Cochrane vs. Fritzie Zivic welterweight bout.

He managed or co-managed more than 400 boxers, including champions Freddie Cochrane,Vince Dundee, and Tony Galento. He had also managed or was associated with Charley Weinert, Tommy Farr, Don McCorkindale, Mickey Walker, and Harry Greb.

He was Tommy Farr's manager for American appearances throughout the 1930s, organizing Farr's tour of the U.S. and Canada. He was the only American in Farr's corner when he fought Joe Louis.

After Culnan and Gilzenberg's boxing ventures fell on hard times, they switched to organizing wrestling matches throughout the state of New Jersey. By 1951, he staged wrestling shows every Friday night at Laurel Garden in the winter and the Meadowbrook Bowl in the summer.

In 1960, the Newark promoter received a plaque from the New Jersey Boxing Writers' Association for meritorious service to boxing over a long period of years. He later collapsed from a heart attack at the NJBWA awards dinner and was rushed to the Muhlenberg Hospital in Plainfield. He was hospitalized for two weeks.

== Personal life ==
Babe Culnan was married to then-vaudeville star Alice Morley. After co-starring in Hit the Deck at the Hippodrome, London, she returned to the U.S., and the couple moved to Belleville, New Jersey in 1927.

== Death ==
Babe Culnan died at age 65 on November 11, 1962. He died from a heart attack suffered at his home in Belleville, New Jersey.

== Legacy ==
He was honored by the New Jersey Boxing Managers' Guild in May 1952 following 35 years as a boxing manager and promoter.

At the time of his death in 1962, he was the oldest active promoter in the country. His last show took place at the Jersey City Armory on November 10, 1962.

He was named in Charley Rose's "All-Time Greatest" list for promoters in September 1968.
