= Tony Galento =

American professional boxer and wrestler (1910–1979)

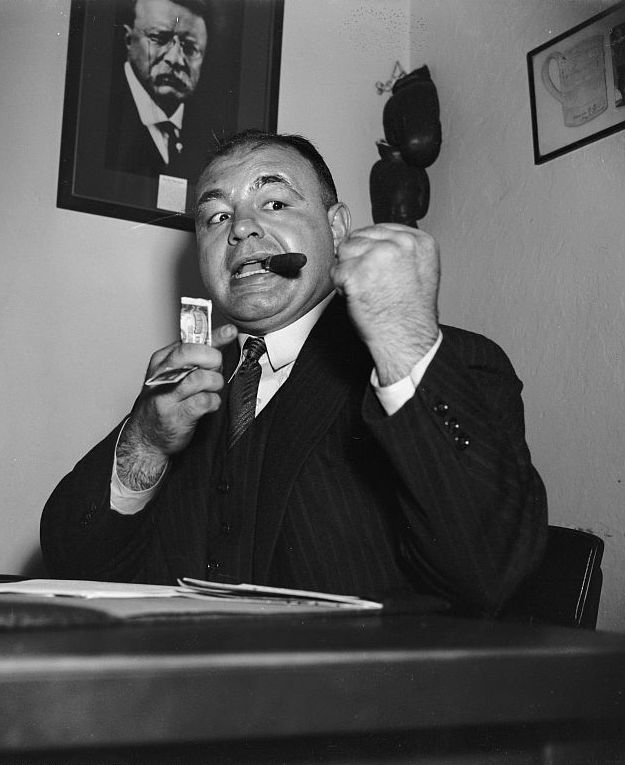
- Galento in 1938

Personal information
- Nickname: Two Ton Tony
- Nationality: American
- Born: Dominick Anthony Galento; March 12, 1910 Orange, New Jersey, U.S.
- Died: July 22, 1979 (aged 69) Orange, New Jersey, U.S.
- Height: 5 ft 8 in (1.73 m) or 5 ft 9 in (1.75 m)
- Weight: Heavyweight

Boxing career
- Reach: 183 cm (72 in)
- Stance: Orthodox

Boxing record
- Total fights: 112
- Wins: 79
- Win by KO: 57
- Losses: 26
- Draws: 6
- No contests: 1

Dominick Anthony Galento (March 12, 1910 – July 22, 1979) was an American heavyweight boxer. He is best remembered for scoring a third-round knockdown against Joe Louis in a world title stoppage loss in June 1939. Active from the late 1920s to the early 1940s, he compiled a record of 79 wins, 26 losses, and 6 draws. Besides Louis, Galento fought against several other prominent heavyweights of his era—including Al Ettore, Arturo Godoy, Lou Nova, and Max and Buddy Baer. Though assumed by some sportswriters to have been a reference to his "pulchritude" or physical appearance, Galento's nickname, "Two Ton", was apparently derived from his work as an iceman: a job he pursued in tandem with his pugilistic career. On one occasion, as a result of his ice-lugging commitments, Galento was reportedly upbraided by his cornerman for being late for a bout. "Take it easy", the New Jersey-born slugger reputedly replied to his colleague's complaint, "I had two tons of ice to deliver on my way here. I'll be right up." In addition to "Two Ton", Galento was also known as the "Jersey Nightstick", the "TNT Kid", the "One-Man Riot", the "Orange Orangutan", and the "beer barrel that walks like a man". The boxing historian Bert Sugar called him a "human butcher block".

Galento is widely regarded as having been one of boxing's most colorful characters. According to Chris Mead, a biographer of Joe Louis, he "was a press agent's dream." Anecdotes, some of which may be apocryphal, pertaining to his outlandish behavior and unschooled wit are common. On learning about Gene Tunney's predilection for reading George Bernard Shaw, Samuel Butler, and William Shakespeare while in training camp, Galento is said to have remarked, in characteristic fashion, "Shakespeare? I ain't never hearda him. He must be one of dem European bums[.] Sure as hell I'll moider dat bum." An alternative rendering of Galento's commentary on Shakespeare runs as follows: "Never hoid of him... What's he, one of those foreign heavyweights? I'll moida da bum." To Galento, all his potential opponents and competitors, even Joe Louis and the Bard of Avon, were "bums". In fact, to Galento, nearly everyone was a "bum".

== Early life ==
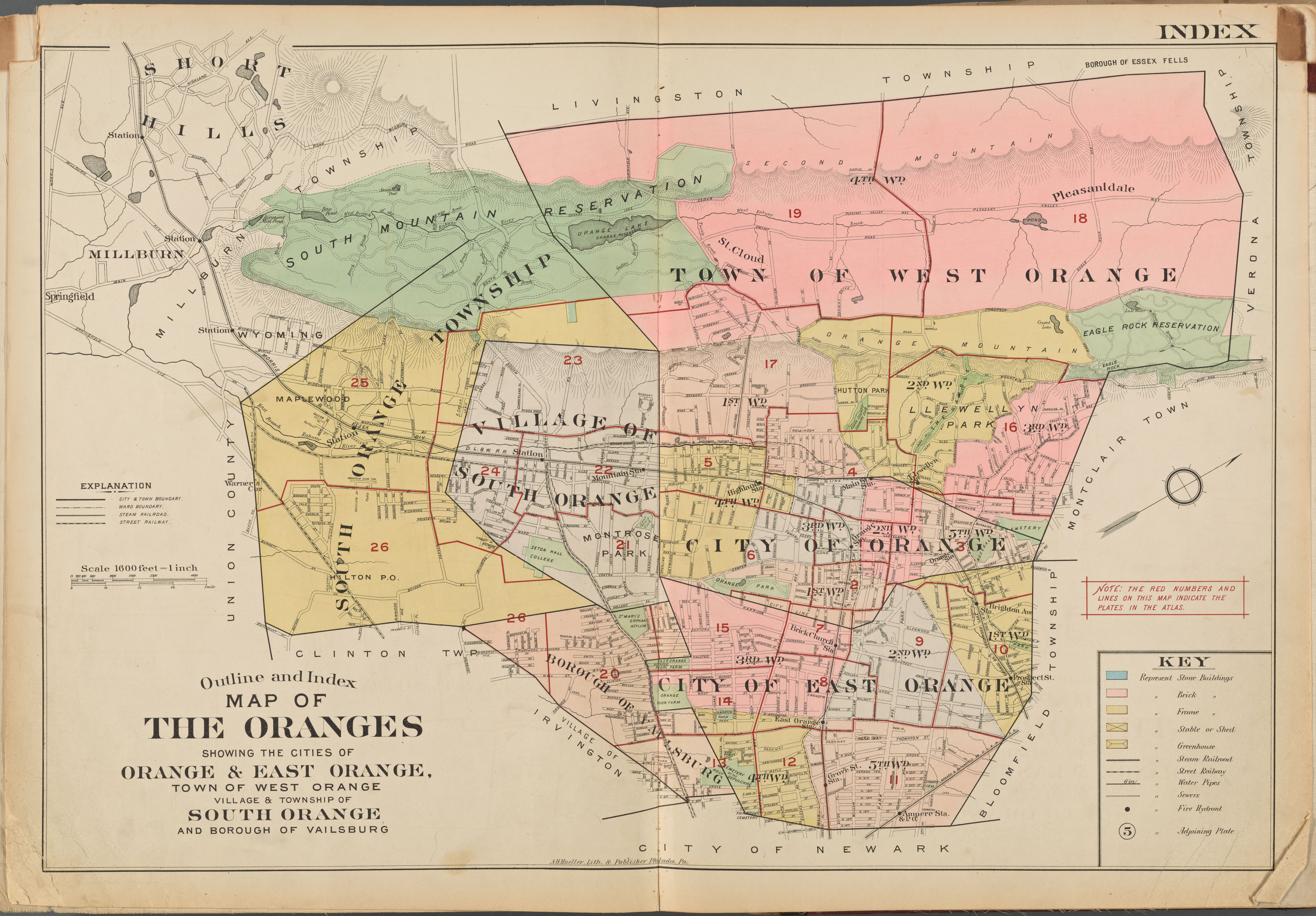
A 1904 map of the Oranges, New Jersey. Galento was born in Orange in 1910.

Galento's parents hailed from near Naples in southern Italy. His father was a quarry worker. After immigrating to the United States, Galento's father got a job in the Edison factory in West Orange, New Jersey. Galento was born in Orange, New Jersey on March 12, 1910. He grew up in an Irish neighborhood and attended the Park Avenue school in Orange until the fifth or sixth grade. At school, he was involved in various violent incidents. "The kids used to call me to lick other kids", Galento reminisced, "and if I couldn't beat 'em I'd use a club. The kids would bring me apples and oranges." On one occasion, in revenge for a kick to the stomach, Galento assaulted an older youth with a homemade pick handle: busting his head and shoulder. On another occasion, Galento broke the ribs of a "guy named Moe" with a "house brick". Robert F. Fernandez Sr., a "highly recognized" collector of boxing memorabilia, states that Galento "quit school early for the simple reason that he hated it."

After leaving school, Galento worked for Mike Cirrillo, a local iceman. He also shined shoes on Sunday mornings. When he was fifteen, Galento had his own ice wagon and horse. At age sixteen, encouraged by his friend and future trainer Jimmy Frain, Galento started boxing at the Orange YMCA. When he was twenty, during prohibition and the Great Depression, Galento was involved in the running of a speakeasy. Later on, from the mid-1930s onwards, Galento owned and ran a saloon on Day Street in Orange.

Discussing his early years in 1969, Galento elaborated on the role of violence in his childhood and adolescence:

I was rotten when I was 12 and I was drinking when I was 15... The foist time I fought pro was in the schoolyard in Joisey. See, I come from a big family and all I ever got to eat at home was eggs and onions. So I started selling protection. S'pose some kid swiped your marbles, or kicked ya kid sister. Ya come to me and we make a deal. For a piece of pie, I beat the guy up. For a nickle, I bust him up. I was pretty mean then, at 12. If I couldn't beat a guy up one day, I'd come back the next day with a baseball bat. When I was 15, I chased a guy named Eddie Ryan for four months. I finally caught him in a diner at 4 a.m. and knocked him through a window. Took 'em an hour an' a half to bring him around.

== Style ==
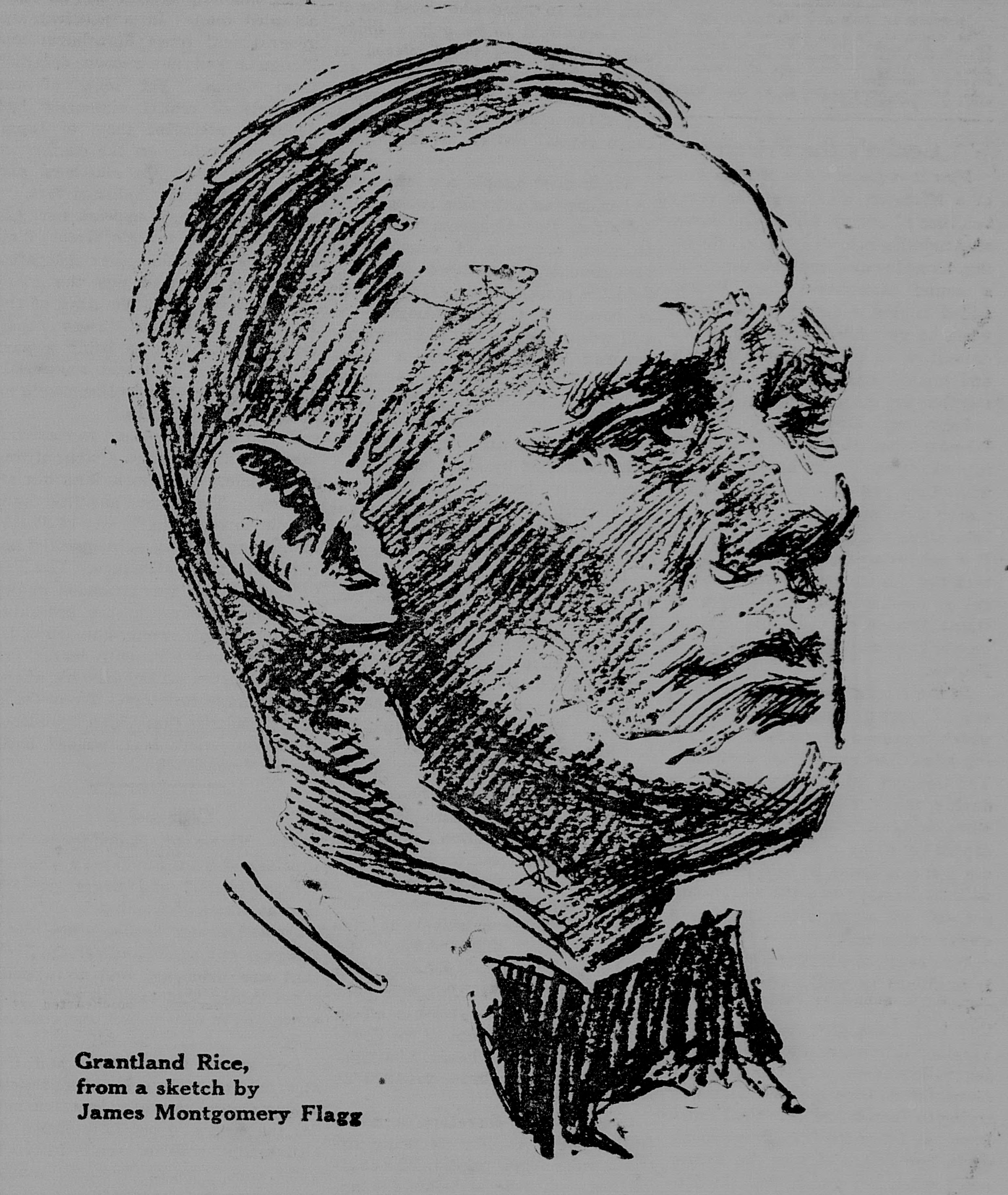
Sportswriter Grantland Rice wrote that Galento absorbed punches "like open buds absorb the dew"

Galento was a "slow and undisciplined fighter" with a short reach. Time magazine described him as a "throwback to Stone-Age man" and disparaged his defence, which, it declared, took "care of itself." According to the boxing writer Bob Mee, he had "all the finesse of a charging rhino". The journalist Lew Freedman has written that if boxing as practiced by Joe Louis was indeed the "Sweet Science", as "practiced by Galento it might as well have been a different sport." Despite his reputation for stylistic crudity, Galento had several quality attributes. He could fight out of a crouch and had a formidable, and unpredictable, leaping left hook. He was also physically strong, durable, and fearless. The licensed boxing judge and combat sports commentator David L. Hudson Jr. writes that Galento "had two characteristics that made him a tough opponent: He could absorb massive amounts of punishment, and he could punch." In a preview of his fight with Max Baer, the sportswriter Grantland Rice wrote that Galento "expects to take his share of punches as part of the game. He absorbs them like open buds absorb the dew." In 1933, the promoter James J. Johnston and the matchmaker Sam McQuade named Galento, alongside Salvatore Ruggirello and Otto von Porat, as one of the hardest "one-punch hitters" in heavyweight boxing.

Regarding his allegedly unsportsmanlike conduct in the ring, Galento is reported to have said: "Y’know, they usta call me a dirty fighter. Heck, I trained hard, maybe drank a little beer, took three showers a day and dose newspaper bums said I was a dirty fighter, da bums." Lou Nova, whom Galento defeated in a poorly officiated and bloody encounter in September 1939, called him a "worm" and intimated that the "New Jersey jellyroll" made illicit use of his thumbs. "Baer may get rough, but he doesn't deliberately try to maim a guy", Nova declared. "I don't mind saying that there is one fighter I don't like. That's Galento. He is... a worm!"

In the first of a series of four articles written for The People, "a populist Sunday paper" with a wide circulation, the journalist A. W. Helliwell argued that, "despite his lack of skill and ringcraft", Galento's “tremendous strength and crushing punch" made "his rough-house tactics dangerous." Introducing Galento to a British audience prior to his title clash with Louis, Helliwell portrayed Galento as a pugilistic anachronism, a fighter out of time:

‘Two-Ton’ Tony was born more than a century too late. He and his antics belong to the roystering bare-knuckle era, to the picturesque days of Bold Bendigo, Deaf Burke and the Game Chicken. His eccentricities, queer methods of training and grotesque physique would have made him a worthy challenger to those colourful hammer-fisted champions of the past.

== Training ==
=== Physique ===
Sources differ regarding Galento's height. He may have been 5'8" or he may have been 5'9". One early news feature, in which Galento is described as a "fistic curio" and a "low-chassised New Jersey youth", claims that he was only 5'6". Surveying his bodily dimensions, the Hall of Fame boxing referee Arthur Mercante Sr. drolly remarked that "Galento stood maybe five foot eight inches tall; but he seemed five foot eight whichever way you looked at him." Whatever Galento would have measured, what seems certain is that he was on the shorter side for a heavyweight. As to weight, however, he was on the heavier side. Contrasting his physique with that of Joe Louis, who was a "trim six-footer at 200 pounds", Joseph Monninger records that Galento "stood a mere 5'8" and weighed a flabby 240 pounds." A contemporary news item concerning their title fight states that Galento weighed in at 233^{1}/_{4} lb versus Louis's 200^{1}/_{4} lb. Fernandez attributes Galento's weight to "his love of pasta and beer." According to Fernandez, the teenage Galento, at the start of his professional career in 1928, weighed in at around 165 lb—under the limit of the modern super middleweight division. By 1929, however, he tipped the scales at 200 lb. During his stint as a wrestler, Galento weighed as much as 275 lb.

Prior to his scheduled bout with John Henry Lewis in 1938 (which was cancelled), sportswriter John Lardner gave the following comic description of Galento's physical shape:

The training grind has put Tony into a new kind of shape, unknown to science. Mathematicians are thinking of calling it the Galentoid. It is somewhere between a sphere and an ellipsis [sic], with overtones of parabola. It is covered with hair, and holds two gallons of Budweiser. The difference between Tony standing up and Tony lying on his right side is hard to detect with the naked eye, but, when he has a cigar in his mouth, you can tell which is north, and the rest is easy.

=== Preparation ===
Various accounts of Galento's approach to training and preparation suggest that it was anything but orthodox. Monninger relates that Galento once wagered ten dollars that he could eat fifty hot dogs before taking part in a bout. Though he apparently consumed two hot dogs in excess of his bet (for a total of fifty-two), and consequently was so bloated as to be unable to fit comfortably into his trunks, Galento dispatched his "hapless" nemesis, the 6'4" "country puncher" Arthur De Kuh, in the third or fourth round: bloodying his nose and sending him crashing to the canvas. As told by Mee, Galento's conception of exercise was highly unusual: "his idea of roadwork was to sit in a car smoking a fat cigar while his sparring partners got themselves in shape by plodding alongside." Mead concurs. Galento, he avows, "did no roadwork and let his considerable appetite run free." In 1937, Eddie Brietz, a sportswriter with the Associated Press, noted that "[u]sually reliable sources" swore that the night before he "kayoed Al Ettore in Philly" Galento "made away with 24 hot dogs, six shots of booze and... a dozen beers". A Sunday Star photograph of Galento in the run-up to his April 1941 "10-round tiff" with Buddy Baer portrays him scoffing a hot dog beside a plate of dozens more. "Beer makes a guy strong", Helliwell quoted Galento as saying.

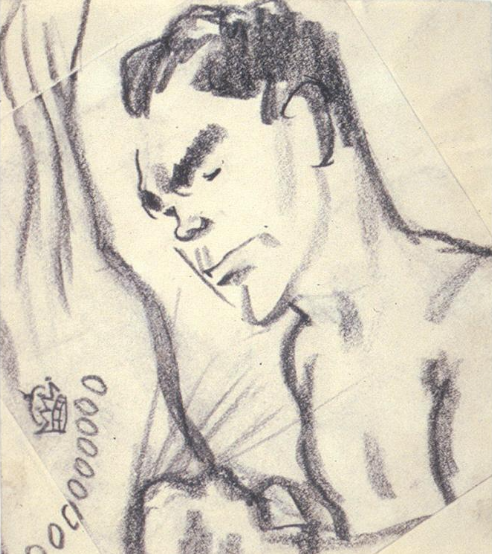
Former heavyweight champion and 1920s cultural icon Jack Dempsey, pictured here in a pencil sketch by the Hungarian-born caricaturist Henry Major, reputedly gave a young Galento a thorough shellacking in Stillman's Gym in New York City.

The legendary boxing trainer Ray Arcel, whose charges over a long and distinguished career included Roberto Durán and Larry Holmes, was not a fan of Galento. Tasked with training him by Jack Dempsey in 1933, Arcel believed that "[t]rying to get Galento fit was a farce", that he "was just bone lazy", and that working with him was a "waste of time and money". Dempsey himself, though he had seen great potential in the young Galento—potential enough to become his manager—came to agree. As Donald Dewey relays in his 2012 biography of Arcel (drawing on a "floridly ghosted" column that appeared under Arcel's byline in the New York Journal-American in 1948), Dempsey's disillusionment with Galento culminated in the 'Manassa Mauler' humiliating the "New Jersey Fat Boy" in the ring at Stillman's Gym in New York City:

Dempsey strolled quietly into the gymnasium and walked up to the balcony while Galento was going through the motions of 'working out.' He was fatter than ever, hopelessly out of condition, and quite obviously doing nothing about it... He didn't see Dempsey and continued waddling around the ring, clowning and wisecracking as he fooled with his sparring partners. After watching a couple of rounds, Dempsey came down to ringside. He was wearing a beautifully cut light gray suit, tan and white shoes, and white silk shirt. When Tony caught sight of him, he gave him a big hello. 'You look like a million bucks dis afternoon,' he says to him. 'Never mind how I look, you big bum,' Dempsey answers. 'Let's see you do some work.'

...

He [Dempsey] took off his coat and stripped right down to his white silk monogrammed underpants and vaulted into the ring: 'Now, Tony,' he told him. 'It's you and me. I'll show you how we used to do it.' He began humming a little tune—an old Dempsey mannerism—and then, as Galento backed away, he flashed into action. Jack was turned forty but his body was as lean and hard and tanned as ever, and for three memorable minutes we saw the old Dempsey, the murderous, tear-away Manassa Mauler... What he did to Galento in those three minutes was nobody's business. He ripped punches into the pudgy torso from all angles, split his lips with a terrific left, and sent the blood squirting from his nose with a right.

...

[Dempsey chased after Galento], throwing punches until I [Arcel] called time. Still breathing easily, Dempsey ducked under the ropes and began to dress while Galento stood shaking his head in a semi-daze and trying to wipe the blood from his face with the backs of his gloves. When he [Dempsey] was dressed, he threw Galento a contemptuous look. 'That's how we used to fight, Galento,' he said. 'Now I'm through with you. You can find yourself another manager.' Then he turned to me and said, 'You were right, Ray. It's a waste of time trying to make a champ out of that chump.'

Comparing Galento to Joe Louis in terms of their professionalism, the sportswriter Henry McLemore wrote that whereas Louis "shuns alcohol, tobacco, [and] late hours", "Galento drinks, smokes, and stays up later than an owl with insomnia." "Louis believes in the outdoor life and healthful exercises", McLemore continued, but "Galento likes to train in a nice dark, smoke-filled poolhall, where the terrific racket made by songbirds, bees and rippling brooks doesn't interfere with his concentration."

=== Retrospect ===
In an interview with Hubert 'Hu' Blonk of the Wenatchee World in 1969, the aging Galento cast a retrospectively critical eye on the nature of his training. Galento told Blonk that he "used to work out two or three hours every day for a fight and run six miles", and then, after his exercise, decamp "across the street" and drink ten or so bottles of beer. "You can't", Galento informed Blonk, "be an athlete and drink."

=== Insult ===
On account of his relative corpulence, Galento's name, inclusive of "Two Ton", was at times used as a childish insult or taunt. The prominent American literary critic Henry Louis Gates Jr. recounts in his memoir Colored People that during his childhood his father and brother would call him "Two-Ton Tony Galento" due to his being overweight.

== Heavyweight championship fight ==
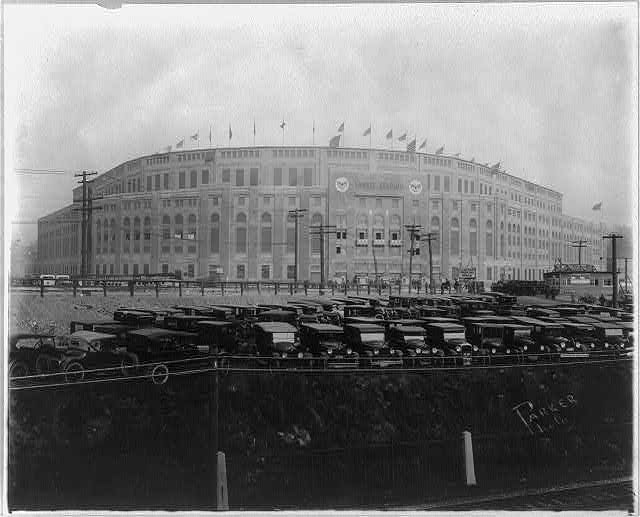
Yankee Stadium circa 1925: the venue of Galento versus Louis in 1939

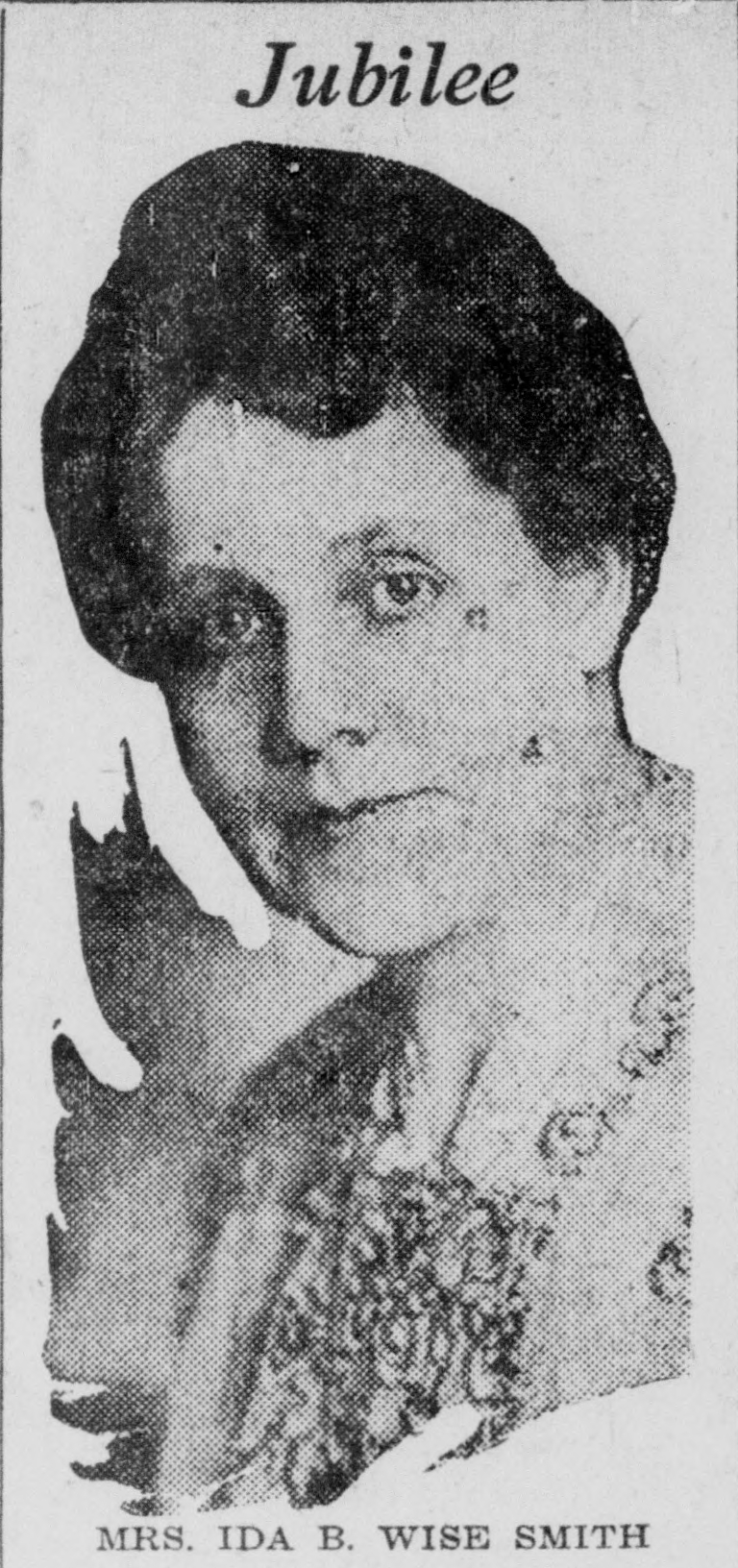
Ida B. Wise Smith, president of the Woman's Christian Temperance Union from 1933 to 1944. The night before Galento versus Louis, Smith sent a telegram to Louis in which she made plain her organization's preference for "clean-charactered young men to users of alcohol."

=== Build-up and event ===
On June 28, 1939 in Yankee Stadium in the Bronx in New York City, Galento fought for the heavyweight championship of the world against the 'Brown Bomber' Joe Louis. Louis was a heavy favorite and "1 to 8 in the betting". In a prefight poll conducted by the Associated Press, only three sportswriters picked Galento to win. 34,852 attended and the gate amounted to $333,308. Famous and otherwise notable attendees included Tyrone Power, Gene Tunney, Jack Benny, Mary Livingstone, Andy Devine, New York Governor Herbert H. Lehman, and "head G-Man" John Edgar Hoover. NBC broadcast the bout and crowds gathered around radios all across the United States. Galento secured his title shot via a run of good form—a string of eleven straight victories—and the promotional skills of his manager Joe Jacobs: a "ballyhoo wizard." Fernandez writes that Galento "looked and sounded like a Damon Runyon character", and Jacobs—who had Galento pose for the press "smoking cigars while punching the bag", "downing full pitchers of beer", and "carrying kegs of beer to 'enhance his training'", all the while repeating "I'll moider da bum" in his "thick New Joicey accent"—"made him even more so." With his "carefully built picture of a fat, lazy man who never trained except on endless cigars and gallons of beer", the Derry Journal's "Roundabout in Sport" recollected in 1963, "Galento climbed the contenders' ladder more because he was the best publicity man in the business than because he was the best fighter." In light of Galento's well-publicized antics, the Woman's Christian Temperance Union, though it regarded prize fighting as "anti-social", indicated its preference for the "clean-living Louis creed as opposed to the self indulgence of Galento and his beer kegs."

In the weeks leading up to the fight, in order to gain a competitive advantage and arouse still further interest, Galento and Jacobs attempted to unsettle and "psych" Louis. Jacobs accused Louis of having "held a metal bar inside his right glove the night he knocked out Max Schmeling", and Galento, without warning or invitation, took to "call[ing] the champion on the phone, insult[ing] him, and predict[ing] a knockout victory." Donald Dewey alleges that Galento, during his "late night calls" to Louis, would "whisper threats and shriek racial epithets". Monninger writes that Galento "embraced the racist stereotypes of his day", and, in his telephone calls to Louis, "questioned his manhood, talked about his race, [and] made sexual references about Marva, Louis's wife." Looking back on his fight with Galento on the PBS sports nostalgia show The Way It Was on January 29, 1976, an episode on which Galento was also a guest, Louis alluded to Galento's prefight behavior. In response to a question from the veteran broadcaster Don Dunphy about whether he was ever "really mad" at an opponent, Louis curtly dismissed the suggestion of Schmeling, laughed, and said:

That's not so. I wasn't mad at Schmeling. That was all newspaper stuff. Schmeling and I were good friends... But that little fellow [Galento]... he really got me mad. All those mean things he said about me while training for our fight. He got me mad, all right. So I decided to carry him for a while in the fight and punish him for those nasty things. But when he knocked me down in the third round, I decided I better not fool around. He hit too hard. So I knocked him out as quickly as I could.

In later years, Galento apologized for his conduct. Louis entertained no hard feelings. He concluded that Galento, despite his gruff exterior and exuberant—even sometimes bigoted—braggadocio, had "no harm in him" and was "just full of wind, like the barber's cat."

Joe Louis circa 1935

In the first round, Galento—"his body crouched, his hands at the sides of his head as if prepared to lock his thumbs in his ears like a pretend bull"—started brightly. He opened with his left: twice swatting at Louis, who, stepping to the side, evaded his attack. Galento persisted and swatted again: stunning Louis with a "full-bore left hook" that drove the champion to the ropes. Galento tried to capitalize on Louis's discomfort with a "hacking" right cross. Louis, however, calmly took it on his gloves. Louis returned to the center of the ring, fended off Galento's "galumphing" advances, and started to land his jab almost at will: "jar[ring] Galento's head back onto his shoulders". Expert opinion granted Galento the first round. He had landed the biggest blow.

In the second round, Louis began to settle into his rhythm. He worked off of his jab and hit Galento with multiple combinations. Galento's face reddened and blood started to flow from his nose and his brow. Lacking other options, given his lackadaisical training and "inattention to technique", Galento continued to trundle forward, looking to land his left. With seconds to go in the round, Louis, following up a successful straight right, caught Galento with a "crisp left on the point of the chin" that put 'Two Ton' down on the seat of his pants. Galento quickly jumped to his feet. He had never been dropped before in his professional career.

In the third round, Louis circled and angled, while Galento, "frog-hopping", followed. Louis landed jabs and crosses. Still in a crouch, "Galento bobbed and moved and took Louis's fists." In the middle of the round, Galento beat Louis to the punch: sending the champion to the canvas with a sharp left hook. Galento's moment of glory, the highpoint of his career, didn't last long. "Louis stayed down only a moment" and Galento failed to press his advantage. Louis closed the round on the front foot. "In the last seconds of round three, Louis connected with a right, a left to the body, another right. Galento waded through the punches, trying to ignore them, trying to find the punch that had lifted Louis, but the cumulative weight of the Bomber's blows began to sag him." Louis's clouts had an enervating effect.

In the fourth round, Louis went on as he had finished the third: "pelting Galento, hitting him with solid punches while Galento's hooks scraped air." Galento was running out of gas. A minute, "or thirty punches", into the round, a round in which the 'Nightstick' landed little of significance, Louis knocked Galento sideways with a "perfect right to the chin". "Louis followed up smoothly" and encountered no resistance. Galento's defence, such as it was, was absent without leave. Louis continued to attack: Galento slumped towards the ropes and fell to his knees. At 2 minutes, 29 seconds of the fourth round, referee Arthur Donovan stopped the fight. Louis retained his heavyweight crown. By the lights of the sports columnist John A. Cluney, the fourth round, on account of its one-sidedness, "was nothing short of modified murder."

=== Post-fight opinions ===
In the wake of the fight, sportswriters expressed a variety of opinions. In his "Win, Lose or Draw" column, Francis E. Stan averred that Galento "did more damage and produced more thrills than more illustrious opponents of Louis such as Primo Carnera, King Levinsky, Max Baer, Paulino Uzcudun, Jack Sharkey and Nathan Mann." John Lardner surmised that "Tony had the chance to consummate the weirdest and wildest upset of this generation of cauliflowers. But he couldn't." The Washingtonian Elliott Metcalf was singularly unimpressed with the bout and offhandedly referred to it as a "disgusting heavyweight thing". Grantland Rice praised Galento as a "game, stout-hearted opponent", but was under no illusions as to the doughty and vociferous Jerseyan's fistic inferiority. Riffing on a quote from Lord Byron, Rice wrote that "[a]ll that happened to brave Tony in the Yankee Stadium last night was a violent and bloody mixture of lashing, laceration, mayhem, face-lifting assault with two dangerous weapons and a touch of TNT." Alongside depreciating Louis's ability to take a punch and Galento's ability to give one, the New York Daily Mirror's Dan Parker approvingly characterized the fight as a "glorious throwback to Stone Age brawling" and a "spine-tingling brawl". Holding forth on what provided his "greatest thrill in sports", United Press newsman Jack Cuddy wrote in 1943 that "[a]mid the electrifying incidents and heroic performances that have stood out like sharply-etched mountain peaks through the years, the Louis-Galento fight to me was the most prominent of all."

Though in the end he was soundly beaten, Galento maintained that victory could have been his if those around him had allowed him to fight his own fight: that is, if they had allowed him to foul and roughhouse Louis. "If I had the right manager", Galento divulged to the journalist W. C. Heinz, "he woulda said: 'Go out and hit him low.' I woulda butted and thumbed him. I coulda been champion of the world." The celebrated Whitey Bimstein, Galento's cutman for the fight, distinctly disagreed. If Galento had simply kept to his instructions, Bimstein believed, he could very well have won:

I still think Tony Galento would have licked him if he obeyed orders. We had Tony bobbing and weaving in the first two rounds, and he had Louis dizzy. He even knocked Louis down. Then he thought he was John L. Sullivan and came up straight to slug, and you can't just do that with Louis. If Tony had fought the way he was told, he might have got in another shot that would have kept Louis down for keeps—and I don't think Tony was the greatest fighter in the world, either.

As for the champion's evaluation of the fight, Louis purportedly described it as one of the toughest he ever had. "Dat white boy hits like hell", he supposedly exclaimed. "Joe said he had to hit him [Galento] a dozen times as hard as he ever hit a man", the Associated Press sportswriter Gayle Talbot informed his readers, "before Tony finally fell into the referee's arms, groping for the ropes in a desperate effort to keep his feet." Asked by Bob Cahn of the Tacoma Times if Galento could hit hard, Louis replied: "Hard enough to knock me down." In 1948, 59 fights into his professional career, Louis ranked Galento as his tenth toughest foe: behind Conn, Braddock, Baer, Farr, Schmeling, Walcott, Godoy, Pastor, and Sharkey.

Commenting on the fight in a letter to his son, Patrick, Ernest Hemingway amusedly mused that "Galento certainly came very close to knocking Louis out and if he can do that on beer I wonder what he could do on Frozen Daiquiris?"

== Other fights ==
=== Lou Nova ===
Among Galento's other notable fights were his contests with the former champion Max Baer and the contender Lou Nova. The Nova fight—held in Philadelphia on September 15, 1939—enjoys a reputation as one of the dirtiest and bloodiest ever fought: earning its "venue the name of Filthydelphia among sportswriters". Galento "used his head as a battering ram, his thumbs to gouge Nova's eyes, and the laces of his gloves to rake Nova's face." "Rabbit punches, kidney punches, and low blows were followed by verbal abuse." The clean-cut Nova, albeit with limited success, attempted to respond in kind. "The only thing that 'Two-Ton' Tony didn't do to Nova, when he had him temporarily on his heels", the Connecticut journalist Jim Morcaldi alleged, "was... bite him." Lewis Atchison, a staff correspondent at the Washington Evening Star, wrote that "Tony used everything but a blunt instrument on his dazed and bloody opponent". The newspaperman and author Sid Feder reckoned the fight to have been as "gory and bloody a spectacle as any slaughterhouse ever witnessed"—Galento and Nova "slugged and mauled, rushed in and clinched, but mostly they just fired left hands and watched the blood spurt." Referee George Blake stopped the bout at 2 minutes, 44 seconds of the 14th round. Nova suffered four knockdowns and Galento won by technical knockout. Gayle Talbot, who characterized Galento's performance as a "surprising and amazing exhibition of hard punching and endurance", proclaimed that "[b]oth fighters appeared as if they had been hit by trucks at the finish". After the fight, Nova said that if Galento wanted to win dirty "it's all right, but he won't go to heaven." Galento, for his part, paid tribute to Nova's toughness, but claimed to have been unbothered by the Californian's power: "Naw, he didn't hurt me. Here, gimme my pants, I wanna go home." Both men were hospitalized and sustained detached retinas. Nova received eleven stitches: five above and six below his right eye. In a retrospective account of Galento versus Nova published in 1951, the Australian boxing writer John Murphy christened the bout the "grisliest knock-em-down and drag-em-out since the days of the last century bully boys."

=== Max Baer ===
Derisively referred to by some newsmen as the "Battle of the Bums", Galento's fight with Max Baer was hosted in Jersey City on July 2, 1940. The bout was originally scheduled for May 28, but was postponed following the death of Joe Jacobs, Galento's manager, on April 24. Though he ended up the bookies' favorite, Fernandez writes that Galento "wanted no part of Max" as he knew Baer "could really bang and could box well if he so desired." Odds on Galento to best Baer shortened further when it came to light that Galento had "thought up an eleventh-hour epithet"—a "mystery adjective"—which he intended to hurl at Baer, and thereby presumably discomfit him, just prior to the fight's commencement. During the build-up to the match various choice words were swapped between the opposing camps. Galento "scornfully" called Baer "Peanut Heart" and Baer called Galento "pig eye". According to Ray Arcel, Galento was perhaps the only fighter whom Baer "couldn't stomach". The attendance was 22,711 and Baer won by technical knockout. Galento failed to answer the bell for the start of the eighth round. Reflecting on the nature of Galento's defeat, Henry McLemore likened the 'Jersey Nightstick' to the ill-fated 'Little Caesar': "Watching Galento grope towards his helpers at the close of the seventh round I could not help but remember the finish of the book Little Caesar, in which the gangster, after years of high rolling, found himself in the gutter, dying of bullets. 'Is this the end?' he cried. 'Is this the end of Little Caesar?.' Tony must have felt like crying 'Is this the end of the Great Galento?.'" Much more so than 'Madcap Maxie', Galento shipped a lot of punishment over the course of their encounter. Bill Fitzgerald, a Transradio sportswriter, opined that Baer had given Galento "one of the most merciless beatings in the history of boxing". "For seven rounds Baer made faces at Galento", Fitzgerald quipped, "and made Galento's face look like a comic strip version of the man from Mars." Gayle Talbot shared similar thoughts. Baer "took his time, dodged Galento's mighty lunges, and steadily punched the fat man into a state bordering on helplessness." Though the effect it had on the bout's outcome may not have been decisive, Galento's preparation for the fight was far from ideal. As Whitey Bimstein recalled:

What a guy... The first time I was called upon to take charge of him [Galento], I watched him work out, then we went back to his tavern for dinner. And what do you think he ate? A big platter of meatballs and spaghetti! Two days before he fought Max Baer. And two days before the fight they called me and told me he had a fight with his brother and that his brother shoved a broken glass in Tony's face and split his lip. We fixed that up and the day of the fight, at three o'clock in the afternoon, he ate more meatballs and spaghetti and drank a dozen bottles of beer. Baer walked right out, smacked him with a right in the mouth and dug a left hook into his stomach. After that was repeated a few times, Tony was through.

=== Ernie Schaaf ===
A lesser known Galento contest—his June 7, 1932 battle with Ernie Schaaf in Newark—may have been a particularly consequential one. As recorded by Joseph G. Donovan in his 1939 Galento the Great, a terse and laudatory biographical tome that was published to coincide with Galento's shot at fame and fortune (his world title fight with Joe Louis), certain Newark "fight writers" attributed Schaaf's death following his fight with Primo Carnera in 1933 to damage inflicted in his tussle with Galento. Whatever truth, if any, there may be to the idea, at least one contemporary press account pronounced that Schaaf had "won an easy ten round decision". Though Galento very occasionally managed to land a hard right to Schaaf's head, and, in the second and third rounds, shook Schaaf with "left hooks to the jaw", Schaaf was apparently the superior infighter and "administered a terrific battering to Galento in the fifth round, opening cuts on his cheek, mouth and left eyebrow." "The fair-haired Boston boxer had an easy time with his opponent", it was reported, "but was unable to knock out the rugged ice man."

Following a post-mortem examination, performed in the aftermath of his fight with Carnera, Dr Charles Norris, the chief medical examiner of New York City, determined that "[i]nflammation of the brain, probably due to an attack of influenza, was the primary cause" of Schaaf's death. Nevertheless, the possibility that Galento was in part responsible for Schaaf's demise was again rehearsed in Ring magazine in 1972.

== Life after boxing ==
=== Wrestling and acting ===
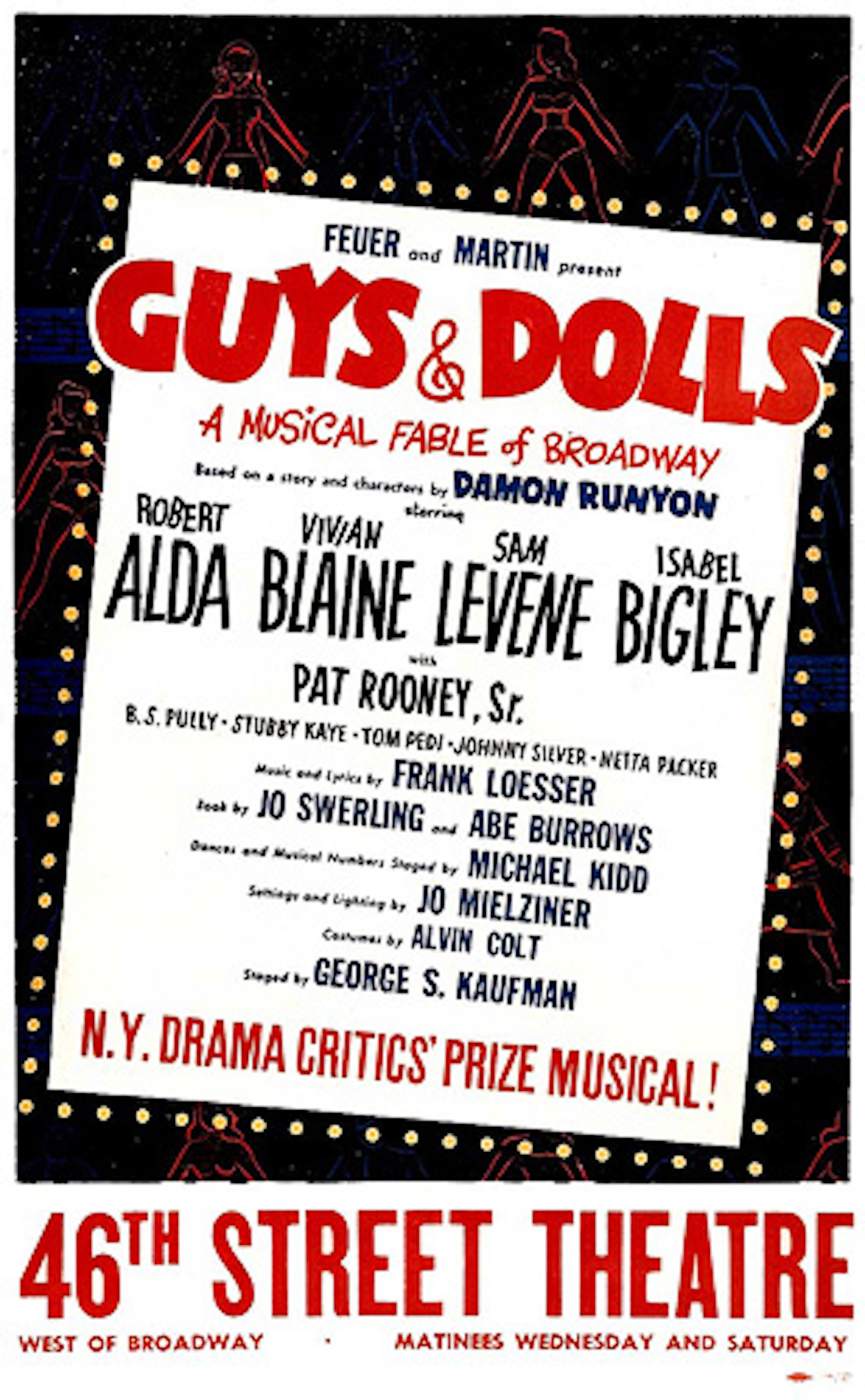
A theatrical poster for the original 1950 Broadway production of Guys and Dolls. Galento, in an uncredited part, appeared in the 1955 MGM film adaptation. In a 1955 stage production that was mounted in a tent near Valley Forge, Pennsylvania, he played the role of 'Big Jule'.

After retiring as a boxer, Galento turned his hand to professional wrestling in 1948. He squared off against fellow ex-heavyweight contender Primo Carnera, grappled an octopus in a giant fish tank in Seattle, fought a 550 lb bear in a cage in Newark, and boxed a kangaroo in Atlantic City. Among Galento's human adversaries in the wrestling ring, other than Carnera, were Man Mountain Dean, Kola Kwariani, and "Nature Boy" Buddy Rogers. The boxing and wrestling promoter Babe Culnan told W. C. Heinz that Kwariani—who had shared a ring with such wrestling luminaries as Strangler Lewis, Gus Sonnenberg, and Stanislaus Zbyszko—called Galento the "strongest man I've ever been in with." As well as tangling in the squared circle himself, Galento refereed numerous matches. He retired from wrestling in 1959. In 1963, for example, he officiated a meeting between Bobo Brazil and Gorilla Monsoon at an "all-star" show in the Washington Coliseum that was promoted by Vince McMahon.

In retirement, Galento also took to acting. On the silver screen, he appeared in On the Waterfront (1954), Guys and Dolls (1955), The Best Things in Life Are Free (1956), and Wind Across the Everglades (1958). On the boards, he played the role of 'Big Jule'—a part most associated with the nightclub comedian B. S. Pully—in a 1955 production of Guys and Dolls that was staged in a tent near Valley Forge, Pennsylvania. Regarding his transition from sportsperson to thespian, Galento said that, in light of his wrestling experience, acting wasn't really new to him as he had been "hammin' all over the joint for the last 12 years."

In a conversation with the academic William Baer, the screenwriter and producer Budd Schulberg said of Galento that he was a "natural actor, and I think he was terrific, except he couldn't remember his lines."

=== Legal difficulties ===
Post-boxing, Galento experienced various legal difficulties. In 1943, following an altercation with a motorcycle patrolman named James Meehan, he faced charges of "assault and battery, disorderly conduct and refusal to put a nickel in a parking meter." "Police Judge Philip Singer found Galento [guilty] on assault and battery charges and fined him $65." In 1946, Galento was arrested on a gambling charge. In 1954, James J. Venere of Newark, a former tenant in an apartment owned by Galento, brought a suit against the "rotund former prize fighter" that alleged that Galento had illegally impounded "$1,400 worth" of his possessions in lieu of the payment of rent. In court, Galento grimaced and affected incredulity: "I'm no lawyer... All I know is this guy owes me $200 rent and HE'S suing ME!" In 1959, Galento and his wife, Mary, were convicted of gambling offences. Galento was fined $25, and Mary, for "maintaining a gambling house", was fined $125.

In 1957, it was reported in certain African American newspapers that "Mr. and Mrs. Joe Louis filed a $250,000 slander suit" against Galento, "charging defamation of character." The suit resulted from remarks Galento allegedly made about Louis on an episode of Mike Wallace's Night Beat television program. Galento reportedly claimed that Louis was a "pushover" whom he would have handily "licked" if he, Galento, who had a battle with pneumonia in the summer of 1938, hadn't been pressured into taking the fight earlier than scheduled. Galento was reported to have impugned Louis's integrity by asserting that he "wouldn't be surprised if Louis himself didn't have something to do with arranging that premature fight." In the African American news and entertainment magazine Jet, it was reported that Louis's second wife, the businesswoman and beautician Rose Morgan, had initiated legal proceedings against Galento, Mike Wallace, and the American Broadcasting Company. Jet didn't indicate whether Louis himself was involved in the action. Writing in Newsweek, John Lardner assured "Mrs. Louis" that she needn't be worried about the "kind of history dispensed by Tony Galento". Young people, if they cared, need only look at the record book to see that, whatever Galento had to say, Joe Louis was no 'bum'.

=== Later heavyweights ===
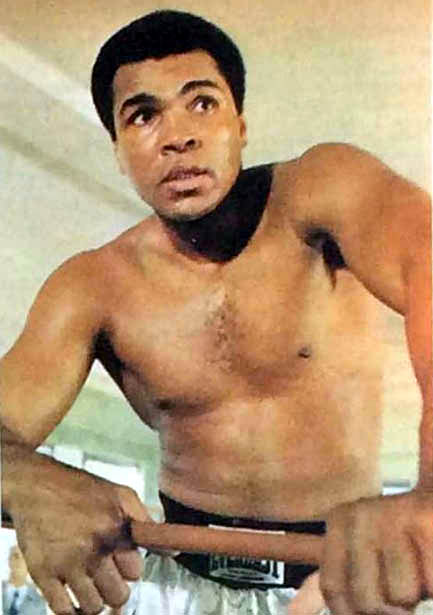
"I'da knocked the bum out in three" Galento said of Muhammad Ali

Commenting on the heavyweight scene of the 1970s, a decade that some fight fans remember as a 'golden age', Galento sounded a disapproving note. "They're all a bunch of bums", he unsurprisingly declared. George Foreman, he said, was a "strong fella, but if he don't hit'cha, he's lost". Muhammad Ali, Galento believed, "should have a clothes-pin on his mouth." "I'da knocked the bum out in three", Galento later said of Ali. "Rope-a-dope with me? If I hit him on the arms he'd have his arms in splints". In 1972, the sixty-two-year-old Galento offered advice to the heavyweight contender Ron Stander, the 'Bluffs Butcher', on how to beat Joe Frazier. "When Joe sticks a thumb in your eye, stick two thumbs in his eye", Galento suggested. "When Joe comes in with his head low, get your head lower and then suddenly bring your head to an upright position. Of course, with his head in the way, you knock out a few teeth. Step back politely and say, 'I'm sorry'." Despite Galento's instruction in the dark arts of rule bending and rule breaking, Frazier stopped Stander in the fifth round of their heavyweight title contest on May 25. A few years prior to Frazier's victory over Stander, Galento stated that 'Smokin' Joe', of the "current crop of heavyweights", was the "best of 'em". Incidentally, Frazier later recalled Stander as a "beer-guzzling knockabout character—a kind of midwestern Tony Galento."

The Canadian heavyweight George Chuvalo, who twice went the distance against Muhammad Ali, details in his autobiography that Galento taught him "how to follow a [head]butt with a short right hand, making it look like the punch caused the damage."

Galento reportedly offered to coach his fellow Jerseyan Chuck Wepner in the run-up to the latter's 1975 fight against Ali.

=== Charitable causes ===
In his later years, Galento was a representative of the Max Baer Heart Fund, the Eagle Cancer Fund, and the Jimmy Durante Children's Fund. All three funds were run by the Fraternal Order of Eagles, a fraternal organization of which Galento was a member and a "travelling ambassador". In honor of Galento, the Eagles started a Tony Galento Diabetes Fund.

=== Encounters ===
A wall in Galento's home was reportedly decorated with blown-up photographs depicting his knockdown of Joe Louis. According to the New York Post gossip columnist and anecdotalist Leonard Lyons, the Manhattan restaurateur Toots Shor on seeing the wall inquired: "Where's the real picture—the one showing Joe Louis standing over you after the knockout?" "That picture's on Joe Louis'[s] wall", a shrugging Galento supposedly replied. In his unofficial role as a go-between between celebrities, Lyons introduced Galento to the playwright Noël Coward.

Galento, when an "old man", was once encountered by the palaeontologist Stephen Jay Gould in a bar in upstate New York. For Gould, Galento was not a figure of fun, but of pity—the perfect picture of an also-ran: "still cadging drinks in exchange for the true story of his moment of glory: when he knocked Joe Louis down before losing their fight for the heavyweight championship."

== Death ==
Following complications caused by diabetes, Galento died of a heart attack in July 1979. In the period immediately prior to his death, he underwent two significant surgeries. The week before he died, his right leg was amputated. Two years earlier, in 1977, his left leg was "amputated at mid-calf at Beth Israel Hospital." Galento was buried from the Roman Catholic Our Lady of Mount Carmel Church in Orange, New Jersey—the church in which he was married in 1935. Galento's funeral mass was attended by Jersey Joe Walcott and Tippy Larkin. Though he had become friends with Galento, Joe Louis, owing to his "ailing" state, was unable to attend his funeral. Louis did, however, attend a "Galento testimonial" in Newark in 1978.

Galento's death was adverted to by the Democratic Party politician Joseph Minish in the United States House of Representatives.

== Professional boxing record ==
112 fights	79 wins	26 losses
By knockout	57	6
By decision	21	18
By disqualification	1	2
Draws	6	
No contests	1	

No.	Result	Record	Opponent	Type	Round,time	Date	Age	Location	Notes
112	Win	79–26–6 (1)	Jack Conley	KO	3 (10)	Dec 4, 1943	33 years, 267 days	Forum, Wichita, Kansas, U.S.	
111	Win	78–26–6 (1)	Fred Blassie	KO	2 (10), 0:25	Jun 21, 1943	33 years, 101 days	Caswell Park, Knoxville, Tennessee, U.S.	
110	Win	77–26–6 (1)	Herbie Katz	KO	1 (10), 0:25	Jun 1, 1943	33 years, 81 days	Phillips Field, Tampa, Florida, U.S.	
109	Loss	76–26–6 (1)	Buddy Baer	TKO	7 (10)	Apr 8, 1941	31 years, 27 days	Uline Arena, Washington, D.C., U.S.	
108	Loss	76–25–6 (1)	Max Baer	RTD	7 (15)	Jul 2, 1940	30 years, 112 days	Roosevelt Stadium, Jersey City, New Jersey, U.S.	
107	Win	76–24–6 (1)	Lou Nova	TKO	14 (15), 2:44	Sep 15, 1939	29 years, 187 days	Municipal Stadium, Philadelphia, Pennsylvania, U.S.	
106	Loss	75–24–6 (1)	Joe Louis	TKO	4 (15), 2:29	Jun 28, 1939	29 years, 108 days	Yankee Stadium, New York City, New York, U.S.	For NYSAC, NBA, and The Ring heavyweight titles
105	Win	75–23–6 (1)	Abe Feldman	TKO	3 (10), 0:31	Feb 23, 1939	28 years, 348 days	Orange Bowl, Miami, Florida, U.S.	
104	Win	74–23–6 (1)	Natie Brown	KO	4 (10), 1:13	Feb 3, 1939	28 years, 328 days	Olympia Stadium, Detroit, Michigan, U.S.	
103	Win	73–23–6 (1)	Jorge Brescia	KO	1 (10), 1:41	Jan 19, 1939	28 years, 313 days	Armory, Newark, New Jersey, U.S.	
102	Win	72–23–6 (1)	Dick Daniels	KO	3 (4)	Dec 16, 1938	28 years, 279 days	Armory, Minneapolis, Minnesota, U.S.	
101	Win	71–23–6 (1)	Otis Thomas	KO	9 (12), 1:35	Dec 7, 1938	28 years, 270 days	Arena, Saint Louis, Missouri, U.S.	
100	Win	70–23–6 (1)	Harry Thomas	TKO	3 (10)	Nov 14, 1938	28 years, 247 days	Convention Hall, Philadelphia, Pennsylvania, U.S.	
99	Win	69–23–6 (1)	Nathan Mann	KO	2 (10), 2:04	May 13, 1938	28 years, 62 days	Madison Square Garden, New York City, New York, U.S.	
98	Win	68–23–6 (1)	Charley Massera	KO	3 (10)	Jan 5, 1938	27 years, 299 days	Armory, Orange, New Jersey, U.S.	
97	Win	67–23–6 (1)	Leroy Haynes	TKO	3 (10)	Nov 18, 1937	27 years, 251 days	Convention Hall, Philadelphia, Pennsylvania, U.S.	
96	Win	66–23–6 (1)	Lorenzo Pack	KO	6 (10)	Sep 28, 1937	27 years, 200 days	Convention Hall, Philadelphia, Pennsylvania, U.S.	
95	Win	65–23–6 (1)	Al Ettore	TKO	8 (10), 2:55	Jul 27, 1937	27 years, 137 days	Nutley Velodrome, Nutley, New Jersey, U.S.	
94	Loss	64–23–6 (1)	Arturo Godoy	PTS	6	Jun 22, 1937	27 years, 102 days	Comiskey Park, Chicago, Illinois, U.S.	
93	Draw	64–22–6 (1)	Eddie Mader	PTS	10	Jun 14, 1937	27 years, 94 days	Ollemar Field, Irvington, New Jersey, U.S.	
92	Loss	64–22–5 (1)	Arturo Godoy	PTS	10	Apr 28, 1937	27 years, 47 days	Hippodrome, New York City, New York, U.S.	
91	Win	64–21–5 (1)	Don Petrin	PTS	10	Mar 8, 1937	26 years, 361 days	Armory, Newark, New Jersey, U.S.	
90	Win	63–21–5 (1)	Jack Moran	KO	2 (10), 1:51	Feb 15, 1937	26 years, 340 days	Laurel Garden, Newark, New Jersey, U.S.	
89	Draw	62–21–5 (1)	Don Petrin	PTS	10	Jan 18, 1937	26 years, 312 days	Laurel Garden, Newark, New Jersey, U.S.	
88	Win	62–21–4 (1)	Terry Mitchell	KO	3 (10)	Dec 3, 1936	26 years, 266 days	Armory, Newark, New Jersey, U.S.	
87	Win	61–21–4 (1)	Roy Lazer	TKO	6 (10)	Nov 9, 1936	26 years, 242 days	Laurel Garden, Newark, New Jersey, U.S.	
86	Win	60–21–4 (1)	Izzy Singer	KO	8 (10)	Oct 12, 1936	26 years, 214 days	Laurel Garden, Newark, New Jersey, U.S.	
85	Win	59–21–4 (1)	Izzy Singer	PTS	10	Sep 14, 1936	26 years, 186 days	Meadowbrook Field, Newark, New Jersey, U.S.	
84	Win	58–21–4 (1)	Freddie Fiducia	KO	2 (10)	Aug 24, 1936	26 years, 165 days	Meadowbrook Field, Newark, New Jersey, U.S.	
83	Win	57–21–4 (1)	James J. Taylor	KO	1 (10)	Jul 28, 1936	26 years, 138 days	Meadowbrook Field, Newark, New Jersey, U.S.	
82	Loss	56–21–4 (1)	Al Gainer	TKO	4 (10), 1:04	Jun 19, 1936	26 years, 99 days	Yankee Stadium, New York City, New York, U.S.	
81	Draw	56–20–4 (1)	Al Delaney	PTS	8	May 11, 1936	26 years, 60 days	Laurel Garden, Newark, New Jersey, U.S.	
80	Win	56–20–3 (1)	Eddie Blunt	PTS	10	Apr 6, 1936	26 years, 25 days	Laurel Garden, Newark, New Jersey, U.S.	
79	Loss	55–20–3 (1)	Al Delaney	PTS	6	Feb 29, 1936	26 years, 17 days	Ridgewood Grove, New York City, New York, U.S.	
78	Loss	55–19–3 (1)	Eddie Mader	PTS	6	Nov 1, 1935	25 years, 234 days	Madison Square Garden, New York City, New York, U.S.	
77	Win	55–18–3 (1)	Al Boros	KO	10 (10)	Sep 10, 1935	25 years, 182 days	Meadowbrook Field, Newark, New Jersey, U.S.	
76	Win	54–18–3 (1)	Willie McGee	PTS	6	Aug 29, 1935	25 years, 170 days	Madison Square Garden, New York City, New York, U.S.	
75	Win	53–18–3 (1)	Gene Mickens	PTS	10	Jul 29, 1935	25 years, 139 days	Meadowbrook Field, Newark, New Jersey, U.S.	
74	Win	52–18–3 (1)	Anthony Ashrut	KO	1 (6)	Jun 13, 1935	25 years, 93 days	Madison Square Garden Bowl, New York City, New York, U.S.	
73	Win	51–18–3 (1)	Larry Johnson	KO	5 (6)	Mar 5, 1935	24 years, 358 days	Scott Hall, Elizabeth, New Jersey, U.S.	
72	Win	50–18–3 (1)	Eddie Karolak	TKO	4 (10)	Feb 4, 1935	24 years, 329 days	Laurel Garden, Newark, New Jersey, U.S.	
71	Win	49–18–3 (1)	Bob Tow	PTS	10	Nov 26, 1934	24 years, 259 days	Laurel Garden, Newark, New Jersey, U.S.	
70	Loss	48–18–3 (1)	Patsy Perroni	PTS	10	Oct 22, 1934	24 years, 224 days	Laurel Garden, Newark, New Jersey, U.S.	
69	Loss	48–17–3 (1)	Marty Gallagher	TKO	13 (15)	Sep 4, 1934	24 years, 176 days	Griffith Stadium, Washington, D.C., U.S.	
68	Loss	48–16–3 (1)	Bob Tow	UD	10	Jun 16, 1934	24 years, 96 days	Griffith Stadium, Washington, D.C., U.S.	
67	Win	48–15–3 (1)	Marty Gallagher	PTS	10	Jun 15, 1934	24 years, 95 days	Griffith Stadium, Washington, D.C., U.S.	
66	Win	47–15–3 (1)	"Italian" Jack Herman	KO	2 (10), 1:55	May 25, 1934	24 years, 74 days	Portner's Arena, Alexandria, Virginia, U.S.	
65	Win	46–15–3 (1)	Battling Bozo	DQ	1 (10)	Apr 2, 1934	24 years, 21 days	Laurel Garden, Newark, New Jersey, U.S.	
64	Win	45–15–3 (1)	Owen Flynn	KO	2 (10)	Mar 5, 1934	23 years, 358 days	Laurel Garden, Newark, New Jersey, U.S.	
63	Win	44–15–3 (1)	Larry Johnson	KO	7 (10), 1:34	Feb 5, 1934	23 years, 330 days	Laurel Garden, Newark, New Jersey, U.S.	
62	Loss	43–15–3 (1)	Edward "Unknown" Winston	PTS	10	Aug 28, 1933	23 years, 169 days	Dreamland Park, Newark, New Jersey, U.S.	
61	Draw	43–14–3 (1)	Don Petrin	PTS	8	Aug 14, 1933	23 years, 155 days	Park View Arena, Newark, New Jersey, U.S.	
60	Win	43–14–2 (1)	Don "Red" Barry	KO	1 (10), 2:23	Jun 8, 1933	23 years, 88 days	Yankee Stadium, New York City, New York, U.S.	Not to be confused with the actor Don "Red" Barry
59	Loss	42–14–2 (1)	Obie Walker	PTS	10	Apr 17, 1933	23 years, 36 days	Arena, Philadelphia, Pennsylvania, U.S.	
58	Win	42–13–2 (1)	Roy Clark	KO	2 (10)	Apr 7, 1933	23 years, 26 days	Orange, New Jersey, U.S.	
57	Win	41–13–2 (1)	Harold Mays	PTS	10	Feb 20, 1933	22 years, 345 days	Laurel Garden, Newark, New Jersey, U.S.	
56	Loss	40–13–2 (1)	Jack Gagnon	DQ	3 (10)	Dec 12, 1932	22 years, 275 days	Arena, Philadelphia, Pennsylvania, U.S.	
55	Win	40–12–2 (1)	Natie Brown	KO	1 (10), 1:42	Oct 17, 1932	22 years, 219 days	Laurel Garden, Newark, New Jersey, U.S.	
54	Win	39–12–2 (1)	Otis Gardner	KO	1 (6)	Sep 14, 1932	22 years, 186 days	Central Park Arena, Orange, New Jersey, U.S.	
53	Win	38–12–2 (1)	Charley Boyette	TKO	4 (10)	Jul 28, 1932	22 years, 138 days	Playgrounds Stadium, West New York, New Jersey, U.S.	
52	Loss	37–12–2 (1)	Ernie Schaaf	PTS	10	Jun 7, 1932	22 years, 87 days	Dreamland Park, Newark, New Jersey, U.S.	
51	Win	37–11–2 (1)	Johnny Freeman	KO	6 (10)	May 2, 1932	22 years, 51 days	Laurel Garden, Newark, New Jersey, U.S.	
50	Win	36–11–2 (1)	Arthur De Kuh	TKO	4 (10), 2:04	Apr 11, 1932	22 years, 30 days	Laurel Garden, Newark, New Jersey, U.S.	
49	Win	35–11–2 (1)	Ted Sandwina	PTS	10	Mar 14, 1932	22 years, 2 days	Laurel Garden, Newark, New Jersey, U.S.	
48	Loss	34–11–2 (1)	Natie Brown	PTS	10	Feb 8, 1932	21 years, 333 days	Motor Square Garden, Pittsburgh, Pennsylvania, U.S.	
47	Win	34–10–2 (1)	George Panka	KO	1 (10), 0:14	Nov 23, 1931	21 years, 256 days	Motor Square Garden, Pittsburgh, Pennsylvania, U.S.	
46	Win	33–10–2 (1)	Leonard Dixon	KO	3 (10)	Nov 9, 1931	21 years, 242 days	Arena, Philadelphia, Pennsylvania, U.S.	
45	Win	32–10–2 (1)	Mike Sankowitz	TKO	3 (10)	Oct 12, 1931	21 years, 214 days	Arena, Philadelphia, Pennsylvania, U.S.	
44	Win	31–10–2 (1)	Abie Bain	TKO	4 (10)	Sep 30, 1931	21 years, 202 days	Dreamland Park, Newark, New Jersey, U.S.	
43	Loss	30–10–2 (1)	Johnny Risko	PTS	8	Jul 3, 1931	21 years, 113 days	Municipal Stadium, Cleveland, Ohio, U.S.	
42	Loss	30–9–2 (1)	Harold Mays	PTS	10	Jun 19, 1931	21 years, 99 days	Playgrounds Stadium, West New York, New Jersey, U.S.	
41	Win	30–8–2 (1)	Meyer K.O. Christner	KO	8 (10)	Jun 10, 1931	21 years, 90 days	Olympia Stadium, Detroit, Michigan, U.S.	
40	Loss	29–8–2 (1)	Jack Dorval	PTS	10	May 22, 1931	21 years, 71 days	Olympia Stadium, Detroit, Michigan, U.S.	
39	Loss	29–7–2 (1)	Paul Cavalier	PTS	10	May 15, 1931	21 years, 64 days	Madison Square Garden, New York City, New York, U.S.	
38	Win	29–6–2 (1)	Paul Thurman	PTS	3	May 1, 1931	21 years, 50 days	Olympia Stadium, Detroit, Michigan, U.S.	Third of three fights on this day
37	Win	28–6–2 (1)	Frankie Kitts	KO	1 (3)	May 1, 1931	21 years, 50 days	Olympia Stadium, Detroit, Michigan, U.S.	Second of three fights on this day
36	Win	27–6–2 (1)	Joe Brian	KO	1 (3)	May 1, 1931	21 years, 50 days	Olympia Stadium, Detroit, Michigan, U.S.	First of three fights on this day
35	Win	26–6–2 (1)	Leo Dillon	KO	1 (10)	Apr 8, 1931	21 years, 27 days	Armory, Hagerstown, Maryland, U.S.	
34	Win	25–6–2 (1)	Frankie Wine	TKO	1 (6)	Jan 23, 1931	20 years, 317 days	Madison Square Garden, New York City, New York, U.S.	
33	Win	24–6–2 (1)	Phil Mercurio	KO	2 (6), 1:51	Jan 2, 1931	20 years, 296 days	Madison Square Garden, New York City, New York, U.S.	
32	Win	23–6–2 (1)	Armando De Carolis	KO	8 (10)	Dec 15, 1930	20 years, 278 days	Laurel Garden, Newark, New Jersey, U.S.	
31	Win	22–6–2 (1)	Ted Sandwina	KO	2 (10), 0:50	Nov 10, 1930	20 years, 243 days	Laurel Garden, Newark, New Jersey, U.S.	
30	Win	21–6–2 (1)	George LaRocco	TKO	2 (10)	Oct 17, 1930	20 years, 219 days	Llewellyn Hall, Orange, New Jersey, U.S.	
29	Win	20–6–2 (1)	Jack Marsling	KO	1 (10)	Sep 19, 1930	20 years, 191 days	Llewellyn Hall, Orange, New Jersey, U.S.	
28	Win	19–6–2 (1)	Frank Montagna	KO	3 (10)	Sep 10, 1930	20 years, 182 days	Dreamland Park, Newark, New Jersey, U.S.	
27	Win	18–6–2 (1)	Pietro Corri	KO	6 (10)	Jul 21, 1930	20 years, 131 days	Velodrome, Newark, New Jersey, U.S.	
26	Win	17–6–2 (1)	Will Matthews	TKO	1 (10)	Jun 25, 1930	20 years, 105 days	Dreamland Park, Newark, New Jersey, U.S.	
25	Win	16–6–2 (1)	Ted Sandwina	PTS	10	Jun 2, 1930	20 years, 82 days	Velodrome, Newark, New Jersey, U.S.	
24	Loss	15–6–2 (1)	Bud Gorman	PTS	10	Apr 21, 1930	20 years, 40 days	Laurel Garden, Newark, New Jersey, U.S.	
23	Win	15–5–2 (1)	Mike Sullivan	KO	2 (10)	Apr 7, 1930	20 years, 26 days	Laurel Garden, Newark, New Jersey, U.S.	
22	Win	14–5–2 (1)	Tom Kirby	PTS	10	Mar 10, 1930	19 years, 363 days	Buckingham Hall, Waterbury, Connecticut, U.S.	
21	Loss	13–5–2 (1)	Al Friedman	PTS	10	Feb 3, 1930	19 years, 328 days	Laurel Garden, Newark, New Jersey, U.S.	
20	NC	13–4–2 (1)	Tom Kirby	NC	7 (10)	Jan 23, 1930	19 years, 317 days	Foot Guard Hall, Hartford, Connecticut, U.S.	
19	Loss	13–4–2	Neil Clisby	TKO	7 (8)	Dec 20, 1929	19 years, 283 days	Boston Garden, Boston, Massachusetts, U.S.	
18	Win	13–3–2	Cuban Bobby Brown	PTS	10	Oct 14, 1929	19 years, 216 days	Laurel Garden, Newark, New Jersey, U.S.	
17	Win	12–3–2	Al Friedman	PTS	10	Aug 13, 1929	19 years, 154 days	Velodrome, Newark, New Jersey, U.S.	
16	Loss	11–3–2	Harold Mays	PTS	10	Jul 26, 1929	19 years, 136 days	Lakewood Arena, Waterbury, Connecticut, U.S.	
15	Win	11–2–2	George Hoffman	PTS	10	Jun 20, 1929	19 years, 100 days	Lakewood Arena, Waterbury, Connecticut, U.S.	
14	Win	10–2–2	Murray Gitlitz	PTS	10	May 20, 1929	19 years, 69 days	Laurel Garden, Newark, New Jersey, U.S.	
13	Draw	9–2–2	Ad Stone	PTS	8	May 10, 1929	19 years, 59 days	Llewellyn Boxing Club, Orange, New Jersey, U.S.	
12	Win	9–2–1	George Neron	PTS	8	Apr 26, 1929	19 years, 45 days	Llewellyn Boxing Club, Orange, New Jersey, U.S.	
11	Win	8–2–1	Pietro Corri	PTS	8	Apr 12, 1929	19 years, 31 days	Llewellyn Boxing Club, Orange, New Jersey, U.S.	
10	Win	7–2–1	Jack Shaw	PTS	8	Mar 7, 1929	18 years, 360 days	Llewellyn Boxing Club, Orange, New Jersey, U.S.	
9	Draw	6–2–1	George Hoffman	PTS	8	Feb 22, 1929	18 years, 347 days	Llewellyn Boxing Club, Orange, New Jersey, U.S.	
8	Win	6–2	Jack Smith	PTS	6	Nov 21, 1928	18 years, 254 days	Armory, Newark, New Jersey, U.S.	
7	Win	5–2	Nick Fadil	TKO	1 (6), 2:46	Nov 5, 1928	18 years, 238 days	Laurel Garden, Newark, New Jersey, U.S.	
6	Loss	4–2	James Jay Lawless	DQ	5 (10)	Aug 27, 1928	18 years, 168 days	McGuigan's Arena, Harrison, New Jersey, U.S.	Galento was Disqualified for butting
5	Win	4–1	Rosaire Boutot	PTS	8	Jul 13, 1928	18 years, 123 days	Boardwalk Arena, Long Branch, New Jersey, U.S.	
4	Win	3–1	Joe Steiney	KO	4 (6)	Jun 11, 1928	18 years, 91 days	Laurel Garden, Newark, New Jersey, U.S.	
3	Loss	2–1	Johnny Alberts	PTS	8	May 7, 1928	18 years, 56 days	Laurel Garden, Newark, New Jersey, U.S.	
2	Win	2–0	Andy Schimala	KO	4 (8)	Apr 16, 1928	18 years, 35 days	Laurel Garden, Newark, New Jersey, U.S.	
1	Win	1–0	Floyd Shimalla	KO	3 (6)	Mar 12, 1928	18 years, 0 days	Laurel Garden, Newark, New Jersey, U.S.	

== Filmography ==
Year	Title	Role	Notes
1954	On the Waterfront	Truck	
1955	Guys and Dolls	Spectator at Hot Box Club	Uncredited
1956	The Best Things in Life Are Free	Fingers	
1958	Wind Across the Everglades	Beef	(final film role)
