= Laurel Garden Arena =

Former arena in Newark, New Jersey

- "Laurel Garden"
- Location within New Jersey
- Address: 457 Springfield Avenue
- Location: Newark, New Jersey, U.S.
- Coordinates: 40.73195°N 74.21082°W
- Capacity: 3,000
- Type: Boxing arena; Wrestling arena

Construction
- Opened: 1922
- Closed: 1953

Laurel Garden Arena was an indoor arena located in Newark, New Jersey. It opened in 1922, and had a seating capacity of 3,000 for boxing and wrestling.

== History ==
Laurel Garden Arena was situated in Central Ward, Newark at 457 Springfield Avenue, near the intersection of 18th Avenue and South 10th Street.

Originally a beer hall, it transformed into an arena for wrestling and boxing matches during the 1920s. The seating capacity of Laurel Garden Arena was 3,000. Its sister venue, Meadowbrook Bowl, was an open-air arena. Due to the lack of air-conditioning at Laurel Garden, the weekly fighter cards took place there in the winter and at Meadowbrook Bowl in the spring and summer.

== Boxing ==
The arena, which opened in 1922, was one of the city's main entertainment centers until its closure in the mid-1950s.

Over the years, fighters like James J. Braddock, Tony Canzoneri, Max Schmeling, Mickey Walker, Billy Petrolle, and Harry Greb were among the champions who fought there.

=== Kline-era ===
In the 1920s, Nick Kline, president of the National Sportsmen's Club, opened Laurel Garden Arena and operated it for four years. He promoted some of the top fights of the century between 1922 and 1926. Argentine boxer Luis Ángel Firpo participated in his first fight in America at the venue when he came from Argentina in 1922.

Kline resumed promoting at Laurel Garden in 1928 before leaving boxing entirely after seven years.

"Two-Ton" Tony Galento, one of New Jersey's top heavyweights, got his start in both boxing and wrestling at the sports arena. Kline staged a 10-round heavyweight bout between Galento and Bud Gorman at Lauren Garden Arena in April 1930.

In January 1931, Nick Kline brought in Jack Dempsey, former world heavyweight champion, for his New Jersey debut as a referee.

Under Kline, the venue also hosted fighters like Benny Leonard, Marty Goldman, Motee "Kid" Singh, Frankie Petrolle (brother of Billy Petrolle), and Jimmie Phillips.

=== Glizenberg-Culnan-era ===
Willie "The Beard" Gilzenberg, a Newark boxing manager, had arranged a card at Laurel Garden as a matchmaker as early as March 1932. He soon joined forces with Thomas J. "Babe" Culnan, a top matchmaker and leading promoter in New Jersey, to put on boxing and wrestling cards. Babe Culnan had managed fighters and became a matchmaker at East Newark's Clarke Field Boxing Club in May 1931. He attended the Monday night fights at Laurel Garden Arena in early 1932 while managing Freddie Polo. That December, Culnan became matchmaker for Laurel Garden and the Newark Armory, with his first event planned for January 9, 1933.

Under the banner of Laurel Sports Activities, Inc., Culnan and Willie Gilzenberg revitalized professional boxing in the City of Newark. Willie oversaw wrestling events at Laurel Garden. Organizing two exhibitions each week, the promoters held boxing matches on Monday and wrestling on Friday. As a promoter of both the arena and its sister venue, Willie managed fighters, handling Freddie Cochrane's career. He also managed the "Bernardsville Bomber," Jimmy Phillips, who had become a national attraction.

Culnan, the chief boxing impresario, put on exhibitions at the opening of the arena's 1933 season, showcasing fighters like Jimmy Phillips, the Petrolle Brothers, Eddie Ran, and Paulie Walker. He also staged bouts featuring Eddie Babe Risko, Young Terry "the Trenton Buzzsaw", Freddie "Red" Cochrane, Vince Dundee, among others.

In March 1934, the State Athletic Commission suspended the fight club for featuring Tony Galento against an imposter posing as his opponent, Owen Flynn, requiring the return of $1,500 in ticket sales.

By October 1935, Culnan was credited with making more big time matches than any other promoter in the state of New Jersey. One of Culnan's cards in May 1936 marked the 37th consecutive weekly promotion, setting an all-time record for the arena. The Laurel Garden ring saw 38-2 Tippy Larkin face his first major competition, Freddie Cochrane, in 1937. Jersey Joe Walcott vs. New York's Abe Simon was staged at the Laurel Garden Arena on February 12, 1940. Simon fought Eddie Blunt in the main event at the arena on April 8, 1940, with 1,800 attending despite the rain.

On August 15, 1941, Willie Gilzenberg stepped down from his role at Laurel Sports Activities, Inc., the organization behind boxing and wrestling at Laurel Garden and Meadowbrook Bowl. His decision allowed him to focus entirely on managing welterweight champion Freddie Cochrane.

A fire damaged the Newark arena on January 12, 1946. Due to the extent of the damage, promoter Babe Culnan had to relocate the Saturday night fights to Orange, New Jersey, delaying it by three nights. 3000 fans later witnessed Joey LaMotta upset Tony Riccio at Laurel Garden on March 18, 1946.

Stanley Kubrick's Day of the Fight featured a scene set in the boxing arena's dressing rooms. Filmed live during a card on April 17, 1950, the Bronx's Walter Cartier was set to box Bobby James.

Around 1950, Duke Stefano joined the co-promoters as matchmaker of four and six round bouts at Laurel Garden.

After many years of boxing shows in N.J., the availability of free boxing broadcasts contributed to reduced attendance at paid boxing venues. Willie Gilzenberg reported that in 1951, Laurel Sports Activities, Inc. organized 45 events at Laurel Garden and Meadowbrook Bowl, with 35 operating at a loss. Gate receipts were showing an upward trend in November 1952.

Laurel Garden Arena regularly hosted Tuesday boxing bouts in 1952. That December, the arena introduced a nationally developed thirty-inch dial boxing clock, produced with the assistance of Colonel Harry Henshel, president of the Bulova Watch Company. Insured for $10,000, the clock used color-coded lights, a bell siren, and a warning buzzer to signal rounds and rest periods, earning praise from Commissioner Abe J. Greene.

Following a feud with the Boxing Managers' Guild of New Jersey, Duke Stefano resigned as matchmaker on October 15, 1953. Gilzenberg brought in Moe Fleischer, who had made matches at the Ridgewood Grove.

One of the final major boxing matches at Laurel Garden Arena was held on May 30, 1953, where Brooklyn's Joey Giardello secured a victory over Hurley Sandler.

== Wrestling ==
Laurel Garden was the host of many wrestling cards in Newark throughout the 1930s.

Ray and Frank Hanly helped promote wrestling at the venue during its early days as a mix of football, boxing, and vaudeville. Promoter Ray Hanly staged the Dusek family's "Rowdy" Rudy Dusek against Italian grappler Alfonse Bisignano in the first show of the 1935 season. A card featuring Ernie Dusek vs. Sándor Szabó and Joe Dusek vs. Mayes McLain was held in May 1935.

Wrestling promoter Jack Pfefer succeeded his rival, Fiddler Fabiani, at Laurel Garden in September 1937. Pfefer was replaced in December 1938 by American wrestler and promoter Joe "Toots" Mondt. "Toots" Mondt had taken over the wrestling rights at Laurel Garden. Musty Musgrave, a protégé of Mondt, promoted pro-wrestling at the venue as early as 1933.

Going by "The Golden Terror," Pete Doherty headlined the Laurel Garden in a match against Dick Lever in February 1939. Hans Steinke and "Jumping" Joe Savoldi were also featured on the card.

Before 1,800 fans at Laurel Garden in 1950, Galento took on a Russian bear in a two-round exhibition. The match was part of the Canadian Legion's weekly wrestling program.

Willie Gilzenberg was a major force behind the early television broadcasts of boxing and wrestling. Television's growing influence led to weekly wrestling broadcasts from Laurel Garden, with Fred Sayles as the announcer. Sayles was a well-known television personality who produced programs for Channel 13 as the sports director for WATV (now WNET). In the 1950s, main events like German wrestler Dick Shikat vs Chuck Morgan were aired on WATV in Newark.

== Music Venue ==
Laurel Garden was also an important music venue.

The arena closed in 1953 and the building was demolished in the mid-1950s.

== See also ==
- Sports in Newark, New Jersey
- Boyle's Thirty Acres
