= Marty Servo =

American boxer (1919–1969)

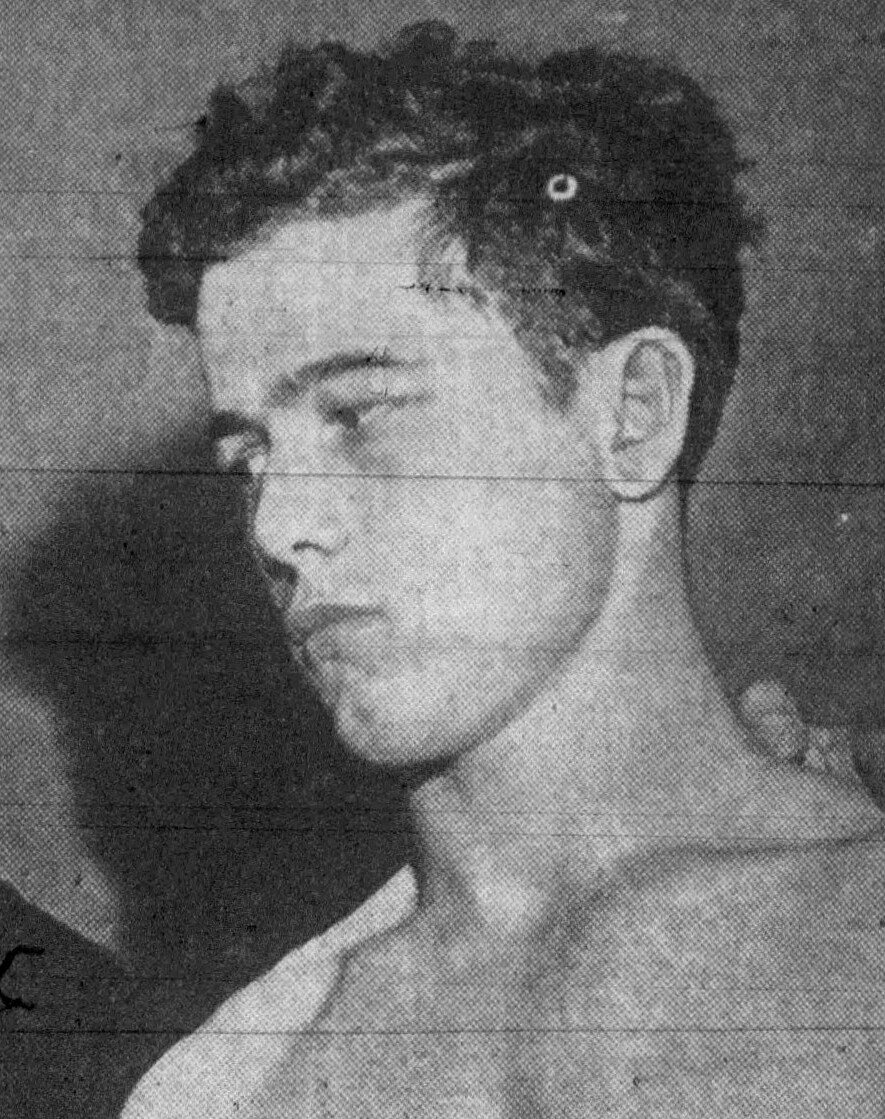
- Servo, circa 1942

Personal information
- Nationality: American
- Born: Mario Severino; November 3, 1919 Schenectady, New York
- Died: February 9, 1969 (aged 49) Pueblo, Colorado
- Height: 5 ft 7 in (170 cm)
- Weight: Welterweight

Boxing career
- Stance: Orthodox

Boxing record
- Total fights: 53
- Wins: 47
- Win by KO: 14
- Losses: 4
- Draws: 2

Mario "Marty" Severino (November 3, 1919 – February 9, 1969) was a professional boxer who held the undisputed world welterweight championship being the NBA, NYSAC, and The Ring welterweight titles. Servo began boxing in the mid-1930s. He became a professional boxer in 1938 and was inducted into the World Boxing Hall of Fame in 1989.

== Amateur career ==
Servo had an impressive amateur career. He captured the Golden Gloves and Diamond Belt Featherweight titles, and ended his career with an impressive record of 91-4.

== Professional career ==
He turned professional as a lightweight and, in his first three years as a professional boxer, managed a 42–0–2 record. As a welterweight he lost two close decisions to the legendary Sugar Ray Robinson.

Servo’s boxing career was interrupted by service in the United States Coast Guard during World War II. He resumed his career after the War and won the World Welterweight Title by knocking out Freddie "Red" Cochrane in the fourth round on February 1, 1946.

Servo and his manager, Al Weill, then made a bad career decision. He agreed to fight the middleweight contender Rocky Graziano in a non-title match. Graziano was a big favorite in New York City and the bout was seen as a big money fight. The two fought on March 29, 1946. This bout effectively finished Servo as a top-line fighter. The heavier and stronger Graziano knocked Servo out and severely injured his nose. Servo never recovered from the injuries and he was forced to relinquish his title and retire. His final ring record, including a knockout loss suffered in an ill-advised comeback attempt, was 48 wins (15 knockouts), 4 losses and 2 draws.

== Illness and Death ==
Servo moved with his family to Pueblo, Colorado after his boxing career. By the early 1960s he was stricken with spinal cancer; the treatment for which confined him to a wheelchair. He died from the disease, 6 years after diagnosis, aged 49.

== Professional boxing record ==
53 fights	47 wins	4 losses
By knockout	14	2
By decision	33	2
Draws	2	

No.	Result	Record	Opponent	Type	Round	Date	Location	Notes
53	Loss	47–4–2	Joe DiMartino	KO	1 (10)	Aug 5, 1946	Candlelite Stadium, Bridgeport, Connecticut, U.S.	
52	Win	47–3–2	Benny Singleton	KO	2 (10)	Jul 21, 1946	Hawkins Stadium, Albany, New York, U.S.	
51	Loss	46–3–2	Rocky Graziano	TKO	2 (10)	Mar 29, 1946	Madison Square Garden, New York City, New York, U.S.	
50	Win	46–2–2	Freddie Cochrane	KO	4 (15)	Feb 1, 1946	Madison Square Garden, New York City, New York, U.S.	Won NBA, NYSAC, and The Ring welterweight titles
49	Win	45–2–2	Stanley Sims	UD	10	Jan 10, 1946	Royal Roller Rink, Schenectady, New York, U.S.	
48	Win	44–2–2	Freddie Camuso	KO	5 (10)	Dec 10, 1945	Rhode Island Auditorium, Providence, Rhode Island, U.S.	
47	Loss	43–2–2	Sugar Ray Robinson	SD	10	May 28, 1942	Madison Square Garden, New York City, New York, U.S.	
46	Win	43–1–2	Lew Jenkins	UD	10	Feb 17, 1942	Arena, Philadelphia, Pennsylvania, U.S.	
45	Loss	42–1–2	Sugar Ray Robinson	UD	10	Sep 25, 1941	Convention Hall, Philadelphia, Pennsylvania, U.S.	
44	Win	42–0–2	Bobby Britton	PTS	10	Jul 15, 1941	Bulkeley Stadium, Hartford, Connecticut, U.S.	
43	Win	41–0–2	Wishy Jones	PTS	10	Jun 17, 1941	Belmont Park, Garfield, New Jersey, U.S.	
42	Win	40–0–2	Billy Davis	PTS	10	May 19, 1941	Arena, Philadelphia, Pennsylvania, U.S.	
41	Win	39–0–2	Billy Duffy	PTS	8	Apr 22, 1941	Foot Guard Hall, Hartford, Connecticut, U.S.	
40	Win	38–0–2	Danny Falco	PTS	8	Apr 14, 1941	Arena, Philadelphia, Pennsylvania, U.S.	
39	Win	37–0–2	Billy Bullock	TKO	4 (10)	Mar 3, 1941	Arena, Philadelphia, Pennsylvania, U.S.	
38	Win	36–0–2	Freddie Archer	PTS	6	Feb 28, 1941	Madison Square Garden, New York City, New York, U.S.	
37	Win	35–0–2	Mitsos Grispos	PTS	10	Feb 14, 1941	State Armory, Hartford, Connecticut, U.S.	
36	Win	34–0–2	Billy Maher	PTS	10	Oct 21, 1940	Arena, Philadelphia, Pennsylvania, U.S.	
35	Win	33–0–2	Lou Fortuna	PTS	8	Sep 16, 1940	Shibe Park, Philadelphia, Pennsylvania, U.S.	
34	Win	32–0–2	Eddie Zivic	TKO	6 (10)	Jul 25, 1940	Bulkeley Stadium, Hartford, Connecticut, U.S.	
33	Win	31–0–2	Maurice Arnault	PTS	6	May 10, 1940	Madison Square Garden, New York City, New York, U.S.	
32	Win	30–0–2	Dominic DeCiantis	PTS	6	Apr 26, 1940	Boston Garden, Boston, Massachusetts, U.S.	
31	Win	29–0–2	Willie Andrews	UD	8	Apr 15, 1940	Valley Arena, Holyoke, Massachusetts, U.S.	
30	Draw	28–0–2	Lenny Mancini	PTS	6	Jan 24, 1940	Madison Square Garden, New York City, New York, U.S.	
29	Win	28–0–1	Joe Marciente	KO	3 (8)	Jan 16, 1940	Foot Guard Hall, Hartford, Connecticut, U.S.	
28	Draw	27–0–1	Joe De Jesus	PTS	6	Dec 1, 1939	Madison Square Garden, New York City, New York, U.S.	
27	Win	27–0	Jerry Zullo	PTS	8	Oct 10, 1939	Foot Guard Hall, Hartford, Connecticut, U.S.	
26	Win	26–0	Bobby Ivy	PTS	8	Sep 12, 1939	Capitol Park Arena, Hartford, Connecticut, U.S.	
25	Win	25–0	Martin Riley	PTS	8	Aug 15, 1939	Capitol Park Arena, Hartford, Connecticut, U.S.	
24	Win	24–0	George Salamone	PTS	8	Aug 8, 1939	Capitol Park Arena, Hartford, Connecticut, U.S.	
23	Win	23–0	Young Chappie	PTS	8	Jul 25, 1939	Capitol Park Arena, Hartford, Connecticut, U.S.	
22	Win	22–0	George Brown	PTS	6	Jul 11, 1939	Capitol Park Arena, Hartford, Connecticut, U.S.	
21	Win	21–0	Larry Esposito	PTS	6	Jul 7, 1939	Municipal Auditorium, Kingston, New York, U.S.	
20	Win	20–0	Mike Angieri	TKO	5 (6)	May 16, 1939	Foot Guard Hall, Hartford, Connecticut, U.S.	
19	Win	19–0	Frankie Rao	PTS	6	May 8, 1939	Ridgewood Grove, Brooklyn, New York City, New York, U.S.	
18	Win	18–0	Al Gillette	TKO	2 (8)	May 2, 1939	Foot Guard Hall, Hartford, Connecticut, U.S.	
17	Win	17–0	Lloyd Lasky	PTS	6	Apr 25, 1939	New York Coliseum, Bronx, New York City, New York, U.S.	
16	Win	16–0	Lloyd Lasky	KO	1 (6)	Apr 20, 1939	Queen's Boulevard Arena, Elmhurst, Queens, New York City, New York, U.S.	
15	Win	15–0	Tony Giello	PTS	6	Mar 24, 1939	Hippodrome, New York City, New York, U.S.	
14	Win	14–0	Ray Garvey	PTS	6	Mar 14, 1939	New York Coliseum, Bronx, New York City, New York, U.S.	
13	Win	13–0	Frankie Parchia	PTS	6	Feb 21, 1939	Queen's Boulevard Arena, Elmhurst, Queens, New York City, New York, U.S.	
12	Win	12–0	Tommy Fontana	PTS	6	Feb 14, 1939	New York Coliseum, Bronx, New York City, New York, U.S.	
11	Win	11–0	Martin Riley	PTS	6	Feb 6, 1939	Rhode Island Auditorium, Providence, Rhode Island, U.S.	
10	Win	10–0	Joey Sole	TKO	4 (6)	Jan 16, 1939	Turner's Arena, Washington, D.C., U.S.	
9	Win	9–0	Eddie Barton	PTS	6	Jan 10, 1939	Westchester County Center, White Plains, New York, U.S.	
8	Win	8–0	Vince DeMarco	KO	3 (6)	Jan 3, 1939	New York Coliseum, Bronx, New York City, New York, U.S.	
7	Win	7–0	Tommy Fontana	PTS	6	Dec 20, 1938	Westchester County Center, White Plains, New York, U.S.	
6	Win	6–0	Eddie Voccia	KO	1 (6)	Dec 13, 1938	New York Coliseum, Bronx, New York City, New York, U.S.	
5	Win	5–0	Al Ragone	PTS	6	Nov 8, 1938	New York Coliseum, Bronx, New York City, New York, U.S.	
4	Win	4–0	Eddie Voccia	TKO	4 (6)	Oct 25, 1938	Broadway Arena, Brooklyn, New York City, New York, U.S.	
3	Win	3–0	Monty Pignatore	PTS	6	Oct 17, 1938	St. Nicholas Arena, New York City, New York, U.S.	
2	Win	2–0	Joe Coskey	TKO	2 (6)	Sep 15, 1938	Lanzi's Arena, Amsterdam, New York, U.S.	
1	Win	1–0	Jerry Hall	PTS	6	Aug 29, 1938	Griffith Stadium, Washington, D.C., U.S.	

== Titles in boxing ==
=== Major world titles ===
- NYSAC welterweight champion (147 lbs)
- NBA (WBA) welterweight champion (147 lbs)

=== The Ring magazine titles ===
- The Ring welterweight champion (147 lbs)

=== Undisputed titles ===
- Undisputed welterweight champion

== See also ==
- List of welterweight boxing champions

Sporting positions
World boxing titles
Preceded by Freddie Cochrane	NYSAC welterweight champion February 1, 1946 – September 25, 1946; Retired	Vacant Title next held by Sugar Ray Robinson
Preceded by Freddie Cochrane	NBA welterweight champion February 1, 1946 – September 25, 1946; Retired	Vacant Title next held by Sugar Ray Robinson
Preceded by Freddie Cochrane	The Ring welterweight champion February 1, 1946 – September 25, 1946; Retired	Vacant Title next held by Sugar Ray Robinson
Preceded by Freddie Cochrane	Undisputed welterweight champion February 1, 1946 – September 25, 1946; Retired	Vacant Title next held by Sugar Ray Robinson
