= Fred Cochrane =

American boxer

Freddie Cochrane
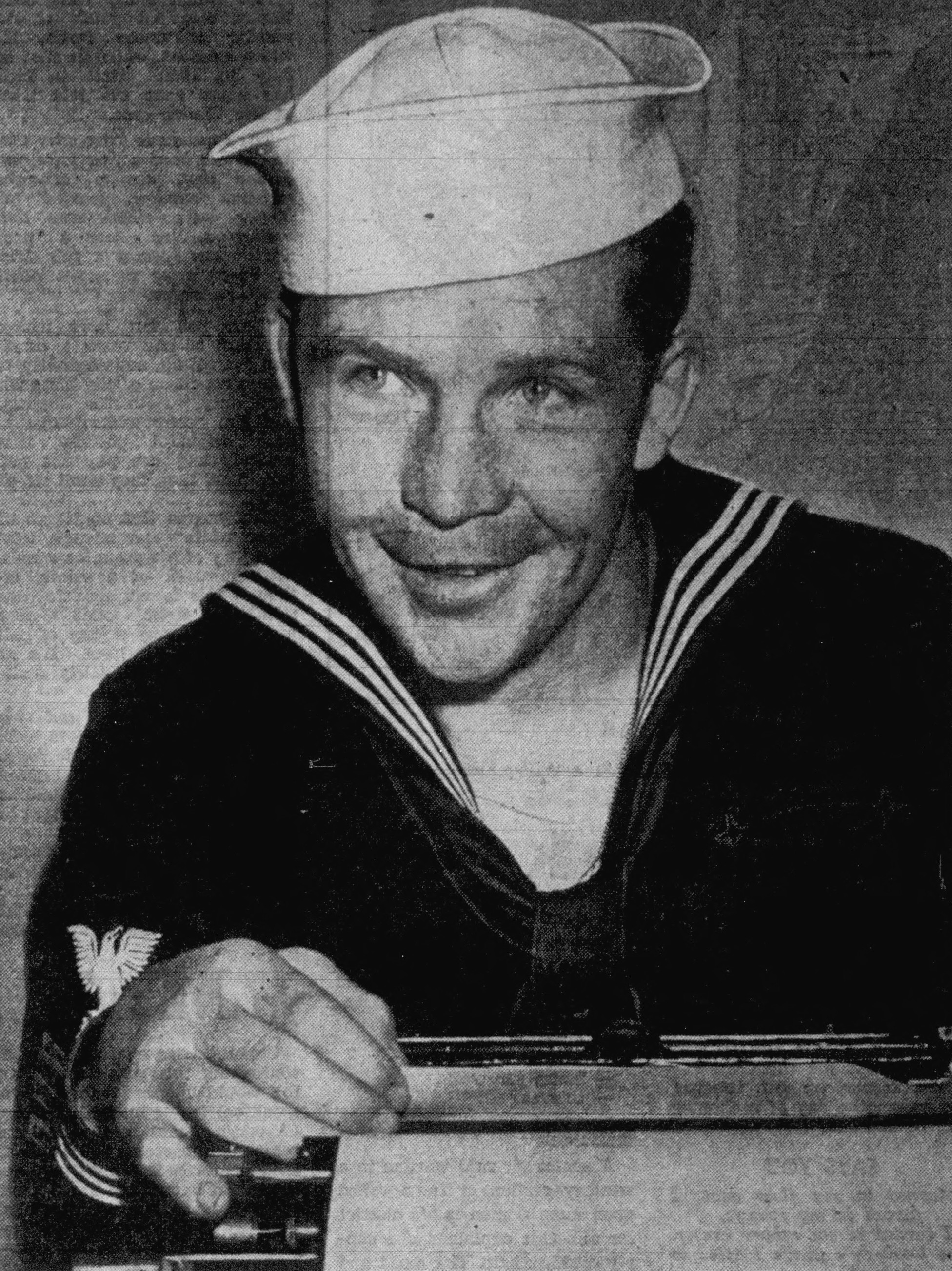
- Cochrane, circa 1942

Personal information
- Nickname: Red Cochrane
- Nationality: American
- Born: May 6, 1915 Elizabeth, New Jersey, USA
- Died: January 16, 1993 (aged 77)
- Height: 5 ft 7 1/2 in (171 cm)
- Weight: Welterweight

Boxing career
- Reach: 67 in (170 cm)
- Stance: Orthodox

Boxing record
- Total fights: 117
- Wins: 72
- Win by KO: 26
- Losses: 37
- Draws: 8
- No contests: 5

Freddie 'Red' Cochrane (born May 6, 1915 in Elizabeth, New Jersey, United States, and died January 1, 1993), was a professional boxer who held the Undisputed World Welterweight Championship from 1941 until 1946. Cochrane was a resident of Union, New Jersey at the time of his death.

== Professional boxing career ==
Cochrane turned pro in 1933 and was considered the World Welterweight champion in 1941 after beating Fritzie Zivic. Although he technically held the title for more than four years, he did not successfully defend it once due to World War II. In 1945 he fought a war with the legendary Rocky Graziano in what was proclaimed 1945 Fight of the Year by Ring Magazine. Graziano was outboxed in the first eight rounds, but knocked down Cochrane in the 9th but the bell momentarily saved Cochrane from a KO. Cochrane was dropped again in the 10th for the full count. The Paid attendance for the bout was 18,071. Two months later he rematched Graziano and again was KO'd in the 10th round. Cochrane knocked down for seven nine counts before he took the full count in the tenth. The paid attendance for the bout was 18,071 with a gate of $100,469. With this bout, Graziano became the latest "Million Dollar Baby".

In 1946, Cochrane took on Marty Servo for the World Welterweight Title and lost via 4th-round KO. Servo would relinquish the crown in September due to "an aching nose". Sugar Ray Robinson would then win the vacant title in December.

== Professional boxing record ==
All information in this section is derived from BoxRec, unless otherwise stated.

=== Official record ===
117 fights	68 wins	36 losses
By knockout	26	5
By decision	42	31
Draws	8	
Newspaper decisions/draws	5	

All newspaper decisions are officially regarded as “no decision” bouts and are not counted in the win/loss/draw column.

No.	Result	Record	Opponent	Type	Round	Date	Location	Notes
117	Loss	68–36–8 (5)	Marty Servo	KO	4 (15)	Feb 1, 1946	Madison Square Garden, New York City, New York, U.S.	Lost NYSAC, NBA, and The Ring welterweight titles
116	Loss	68–35–8 (5)	Rocky Graziano	KO	10 (10)	Aug 24, 1945	Madison Square Garden, New York City, New York, U.S.	
115	Win	68–34–8 (5)	Lou Miller	KO	3 (10)	Jul 17, 1945	Lyric Theater, Knoxville, Tennessee, U.S.	
114	Loss	67–34–8 (5)	Rocky Graziano	KO	10 (10)	Jun 29, 1945	Madison Square Garden, New York City, New York, U.S.	
113	Win	67–33–8 (5)	Alex Doyle	TKO	2 (10)	Jun 13, 1945	Blue Hen Arena, Wilmington, Delaware, U.S.	
112	Win	66–33–8 (5)	Eddie Miller	KO	2 (10)	Jun 11, 1945	City Auditorium, Atlanta, Georgia, U.S.	
111	Win	65–33–8 (5)	Al Stanley	KO	2 (?)	Jun 9, 1945	Municipal Auditorium, Aiken, South Carolina, U.S.	
110	Win	64–33–8 (5)	Jimmy Mazzio	KO	2 (10)	Jun 8, 1945	Jacksonville, North Carolina, U.S.	
109	Win	63–33–8 (5)	Pete Lello	KO	2 (10)	Jun 1, 1945	Jacksonville, Florida, U.S.	
108	Loss	62–33–8 (5)	Fritzie Zivic	UD	10	Sep 10, 1942	Madison Square Garden, New York City, New York, U.S.	
107	Loss	62–32–8 (5)	Garvey Young	SD	10	May 8, 1942	Boston Garden, Boston, Massachusetts, U.S.	
106	Win	62–31–8 (5)	Bobby Britton	SD	10	Dec 19, 1941	Biscayne Fronton, Miami, Florida, U.S.	
105	Win	61–31–8 (5)	Lew Jenkins	UD	10	Oct 6, 1941	Madison Square Garden, New York City, New York, U.S.	
104	Win	60–31–8 (5)	Fritzie Zivic	PTS	15	Jun 29, 1941	Ruppert Stadium, Newark, New Jersey, U.S.	Won NYSAC, NBA, and The Ring welterweight titles
103	Win	59–31–8 (5)	Frank Fariello	KO	3 (10)	Jun 27, 1941	Municipal Stadium, Long Branch, New Jersey, U.S.	
102	Win	58–31–8 (5)	Rego Dell	PTS	8	Apr 23, 1941	Raritan Auditorium, Perth Amboy, New Jersey, U.S.	
101	Win	57–31–8 (5)	Oscar Poindexter	KO	2 (8)	Mar 20, 1941	Waltz Dream Arena, Atlantic City, New Jersey, U.S.	
100	Win	56–31–8 (5)	Joe De Jesus	KO	1 (8)	Mar 5, 1941	Raritan Auditorium, Perth Amboy, New Jersey, U.S.	
99	Win	55–31–8 (5)	Ray Powell	TKO	3 (8)	Feb 27, 1941	Waltz Dream Arena, Atlantic City, New Jersey, U.S.	
98	Win	54–31–8 (5)	Norman Rubio	PTS	8	Feb 5, 1941	Raritan Auditorium, Perth Amboy, New Jersey, U.S.	
97	Win	53–31–8 (5)	Norman Rubio	PTS	10	Jan 13, 1941	Laurel Garden, Newark, New Jersey, U.S.	
96	Win	52–31–8 (5)	Joe De Jesus	PTS	8	Dec 30, 1940	Laurel Garden, Newark, New Jersey, U.S.	
95	Win	51–31–8 (5)	Vince Delia	KO	3 (8)	Dec 16, 1940	Arena, Trenton, New Jersey, U.S.	
94	Loss	50–31–8 (5)	Norman Rubio	PTS	10	Nov 25, 1940	Laurel Garden, Newark, New Jersey, U.S.	
93	Win	50–30–8 (5)	Norman Rubio	PTS	10	Oct 21, 1940	Laurel Garden, Newark, New Jersey, U.S.	
92	Win	49–30–8 (5)	Bobby Masters	KO	5 (10)	Sep 16, 1940	Meadowbrook Bowl, Newark, New Jersey, U.S.	
91	Win	48–30–8 (5)	Mickey Makar	KO	4 (12)	Jul 8, 1940	Meadowbrook Bowl, Newark, New Jersey, U.S.	
90	Win	47–30–8 (5)	Maurice Arnault	TKO	5 (10)	Jun 25, 1940	Meadowbrook Bowl, Newark, New Jersey, U.S.	
89	Win	46–30–8 (5)	Dave Chacon	PTS	10	May 23, 1940	Armory, Elizabeth, New Jersey, U.S.	
88	Win	45–30–8 (5)	Dave Chacon	PTS	10	Apr 12, 1940	Armory, Elizabeth, New Jersey, U.S.	
87	Draw	44–30–8 (5)	Billy Beauhuld	PTS	10	Mar 18, 1940	Laurel Garden, Newark, New Jersey, U.S.	
86	Win	44–30–7 (5)	Larry Mangine	TKO	3 (10)	Mar 11, 1940	Arena, Trenton, New Jersey, U.S.	
85	Loss	43–30–7 (5)	Mike Kaplan	PTS	8	Feb 23, 1940	Madison Square Garden, New York City, New York, U.S.	
84	Win	43–29–7 (5)	Norman Hurdman	PTS	8	Jan 18, 1940	Coliseum, Baltimore, Maryland, U.S.	
83	Win	42–29–7 (5)	Julio Gonzales	PTS	10	Oct 9, 1939	Laurel Garden, Newark, New Jersey, U.S.	
82	Win	41–29–7 (5)	Tony Martin	PTS	10	Jul 31, 1939	Meadowbrook Bowl, Newark, New Jersey, U.S.	
81	Win	40–29–7 (5)	Lou Fortuna	PTS	10	Nov 26, 1939	Meadowbrook Bowl, Newark, New Jersey, U.S.	
80	Win	39–29–7 (5)	Lou Fortuna	PTS	8	May 8, 1939	Laurel Garden, Newark, New Jersey, U.S.	
79	Win	38–29–7 (5)	Eddie Brink	PTS	10	Apr 24, 1939	Laurel Garden, Newark, New Jersey, U.S.	
78	Loss	37–29–7 (5)	Mike Piskin	PTS	10	Apr 10, 1939	Laurel Garden, Newark, New Jersey, U.S.	
77	Win	37–28–7 (5)	Tony Maglione	PTS	8	Mar 27, 1939	Arena, Trenton, New Jersey, U.S.	
76	Loss	36–28–7 (5)	Billy Beauhuld	PTS	10	Feb 27, 1939	Laurel Garden, Newark, New Jersey, U.S.	
75	Win	36–27–7 (5)	Ray Napolitano	TKO	4 (10)	Feb 6, 1939	Laurel Garden, Newark, New Jersey, U.S.	
74	Win	35–27–7 (5)	Lou Lombardi	PTS	8	Dec 26, 1938	Laurel Garden, Newark, New Jersey, U.S.	
73	Loss	34–27–7 (5)	Paulie Walker	TKO	5 (10)	Oct 10, 1938	Arena, Trenton, New Jersey, U.S.	
72	Loss	34–26–7 (5)	Tippy Larkin	PTS	15	Aug 29, 1938	Meadowbrook Bowl, Newark, New Jersey, U.S.	
71	Win	34–25–7 (5)	Pete Mascia	TKO	3 (8)	Aug 23, 1938	Elizabeth, New Jersey, U.S.	Mascia suffered a dislocated shoulder
70	Win	33–25–7 (5)	Phil Baker	PTS	8	Aug 9, 1938	Meadowbrook Bowl, Newark, New Jersey, U.S.	
69	Win	32–25–7 (5)	Jack Kid Berg	PTS	10	Jul 25, 1938	Meadowbrook Bowl, Newark, New Jersey, U.S.	
68	Loss	31–25–7 (5)	Tippy Larkin	PTS	10	Jul 5, 1938	Meadowbrook Bowl, Newark, New Jersey, U.S.	
67	Win	31–24–7 (5)	Larry Mangine	KO	1 (10)	Jun 6, 1938	Arena, Trenton, New Jersey, U.S.	
66	Draw	30–24–7 (5)	Eddie Alzek	PTS	8	May 9, 1938	Belmont Park, Garfield, New Jersey, U.S.	
65	Win	30–24–6 (5)	Stumpy Jacobs	PTS	10	Apr 8, 1938	Auditorium, Wilmington, Delaware, U.S.	
64	Win	29–24–6 (5)	Maxie Fisher	PTS	8	Apr 4, 1938	Laurel Garden, Newark, New Jersey, U.S.	
63	Win	28–24–6 (5)	Mickey Duca	MD	10	Mar 3, 1938	Auditorium, Wilmington, Delaware, U.S.	
62	Win	27–24–6 (5)	Johnny Rohrig	PTS	8	Feb 24, 1938	Armory, Passaic, New Jersey, U.S.	
61	Draw	26–24–6 (5)	Mickey Duca	PTS	8	Feb 17, 1938	Auditorium, Wilmington, Delaware, U.S.	
60	Win	26–24–5 (5)	Tommy Speigal	PTS	10	Nov 30, 1937	Coliseum, Coral Gables, Florida, U.S.	
59	Loss	25–24–5 (5)	Mike Piskin	PTS	10	Nov 22, 1937	Laurel Garden, Newark, New Jersey, U.S.	
58	Loss	25–23–5 (5)	Norment Quarles	PTS	10	Nov 8, 1937	City Auditorium, Richmond, Virginia, U.S.	
57	Win	25–22–5 (5)	Tommy Speigal	PTS	10	Oct 25, 1937	City Auditorium, Richmond, Virginia, U.S.	
56	Draw	24–22–5 (5)	Tommy Speigal	PTS	10	Oct 4, 1937	City Auditorium, Richmond, Virginia, U.S.	
55	Win	24–22–4 (5)	Bucky Keyes	KO	2 (?)	Sep 21, 1937	Elizabeth, New Jersey, U.S.	
54	Loss	23–22–4 (5)	Pedro Montañez	KO	2 (10)	Aug 16, 1937	Braddock Bowl, Jersey City, New Jersey, U.S.	
53	Loss	23–21–4 (5)	Ralph Vona	NWS	6	Aug 10, 1937	East Broad Street Arena, Elizabeth, New Jersey, U.S.	
52	Win	23–21–4 (4)	Ralph Vona	PTS	6	Aug 3, 1937	East Broad Street Arena, Elizabeth, New Jersey, U.S.	
51	Loss	22–21–4 (4)	Tippy Larkin	PTS	10	Jul 2, 1937	Ocean View A.A., Long Branch, New Jersey, U.S.	
50	Loss	22–20–4 (4)	Tony Morgano	PTS	10	Jun 28, 1937	Arena Stadium, Philadelphia, Pennsylvania, U.S.	
49	Win	22–19–4 (4)	Johnny Alba	KO	3 (?)	Jun 15, 1937	Elizabeth, New Jersey, U.S.	
48	Loss	21–19–4 (4)	Freddie Miller	PTS	8	Jun 7, 1937	Dexter Park Arena, Woodhaven, Queens, New York City, New York, U.S.	
47	Loss	21–18–4 (4)	Tippy Larkin	PTS	10	May 24, 1937	Ollemar Field, Irvington, New Jersey, U.S.	
46	Loss	21–17–4 (4)	Irving Eldridge	PTS	8	May 18, 1937	New York Coliseum, Bronx, New York City, New York, U.S.	
45	Loss	21–16–4 (4)	Tippy Larkin	PTS	9	Mar 22, 1937	Laurel Garden, Newark, New Jersey, U.S.	
44	Loss	21–15–4 (4)	Eddie Cool	PTS	10	Feb 19, 1937	Cambria A.C., Philadelphia, Pennsylvania, U.S.	
43	Loss	21–14–4 (4)	Benny Bass	PTS	10	Jan 22, 1937	Cambria A.C., Philadelphia, Pennsylvania, U.S.	
42	Loss	21–13–4 (4)	Irving Eldridge	PTS	10	Dec 3, 1936	Armory, Newark, New Jersey, U.S.	
41	Loss	21–12–4 (4)	Charley Gomer	PTS	8	Nov 3, 1936	New York Coliseum, Bronx, New York City, New York, U.S.	
40	Win	21–11–4 (4)	Pete Mascia	PTS	10	Oct 19, 1936	Laurel Garden, Newark, New Jersey, U.S.	
39	Loss	20–11–4 (4)	Phil Baker	PTS	10	Sep 29, 1936	Braddock Bowl, Jersey City, New Jersey, U.S.	
38	Loss	20–10–4 (4)	Enrico Venturi	PTS	10	Sep 1, 1936	Braddock Bowl, Jersey City, New Jersey, U.S.	
37	Loss	20–9–4 (4)	Maxie Fisher	PTS	10	Jul 21, 1936	Meadowbrook Bowl, Newark, New Jersey, U.S.	
36	Loss	20–8–4 (4)	Al Roth	PTS	10	Jun 29, 1936	Meadowbrook Bowl, Newark, New Jersey, U.S.	
35	Win	20–7–4 (4)	Al Gillette	PTS	10	May 4, 1936	Laurel Garden, Newark, New Jersey, U.S.	
34	Loss	19–7–4 (4)	Lew Feldman	PTS	8	Apr 9, 1936	St. Nicholas Arena, New York City, New York, U.S.	
33	Win	19–6–4 (4)	Johnny Jadick	PTS	10	Feb 24, 1936	Laurel Garden, Newark, New Jersey, U.S.	
32	Win	18–6–4 (4)	George Levy	PTS	10	Jan 27, 1936	Laurel Garden, Newark, New Jersey, U.S.	
31	Win	17–6–4 (4)	Maxie Fisher	PTS	10	Dec 9, 1935	Laurel Garden, Newark, New Jersey, U.S.	
30	Loss	16–6–4 (4)	Aldo Spoldi	PTS	8	Nov 8, 1935	Chicago Stadium, Chicago, Illinois, U.S.	
29	Loss	16–5–4 (4)	Maxie Fisher	PTS	10	Oct 28, 1935	Laurel Garden, Newark, New Jersey, U.S.	
28	Draw	16–4–4 (4)	Mickey Page	PTS	10	Oct 7, 1935	Laurel Garden, Newark, New Jersey, U.S.	
27	Loss	16–4–3 (4)	Lew Massey	PTS	10	Sep 16, 1935	Laurel Garden, Newark, New Jersey, U.S.	
26	Win	16–3–3 (4)	Frankie Warno	TKO	8 (8)	Sep 9, 1935	Arena, Trenton, New Jersey, U.S.	
25	Loss	15–3–3 (4)	Lew Monte	PTS	6	Jul 10, 1935	Elizabeth, New Jersey, U.S.	
24	Win	15–2–3 (4)	Mickey Cohen	KO	2 (10)	Jun 11, 1935	Nutley Velodrome, Nutley, New Jersey, U.S.	
23	Win	14–2–3 (4)	Mickey Greb	NWS	4	May 27, 1935	East Broad Street Arena, Elizabeth, New Jersey, U.S.	
22	Win	14–2–3 (3)	Al Roth	PTS	8	May 6, 1935	Laurel Garden, Newark, New Jersey, U.S.	
21	Win	13–2–3 (3)	Julie Katz	PTS	8	Mar 25, 1935	Laurel Garden, Newark, New Jersey, U.S.	
20	Draw	12–2–3 (3)	Joe Ardito	PTS	6	May 3, 1935	Elizabeth, New Jersey, U.S.	Date and location undetermined
19	Win	12–2–2 (3)	Joe Vacchiano	NWS	6	Feb 18, 1935	Laurel Garden, Newark, New Jersey, U.S.	
18	Win	12–2–2 (2)	Johnny Riccaduli	NWS	6	Feb 5, 1935	Union County AA, Elizabeth, New Jersey, U.S.	
17	Win	12–2–2 (1)	Chang Collura	KO	3 (6)	Jan 22, 1935	Moose Hall, Elizabeth, New Jersey, U.S.	
16	Loss	11–2–2 (1)	Chang Collura	PTS	6	Jan 7, 1935	Laurel Garden, Newark, New Jersey, U.S.	
15	Loss	11–1–2 (1)	Emil Calcagni	PTS	6	Dec 20, 1934	Teterboro Airdrome, Hasbrouck Heights, New Jersey, U.S.	
14	Win	11–0–2 (1)	Joe Ardito	PTS	6	Oct 8, 1934	Laurel Garden, Newark, New Jersey, U.S.	
13	Win	10–0–2 (1)	Lew Greenberg	KO	4 (?)	Sep 26, 1934	Newark, New Jersey, U.S.	
12	Win	9–0–2 (1)	Ernie Tackett	PTS	5	Sep 11, 1934	Union County AA, Elizabeth, New Jersey, U.S.	
11	Win	8–0–2 (1)	Paddy Gordon	NWS	6	Aug 21, 1934	Union County AA, Elizabeth, New Jersey, U.S.	
10	Win	8–0–2	Paddy Gordon	PTS	6	Aug 12, 1934	Elizabeth, New Jersey, U.S.	Date approximate
9	Win	7–0–2	Jackie Corcoran	PTS	6	Jul 31, 1934	Elizabeth, New Jersey, U.S.	
8	Win	6–0–2	Jackie Corcoran	PTS	6	Jul 17, 1934	Elizabeth, New Jersey, U.S.	
7	Win	5–0–2	Marvin Hart	PTS	6	Jul 7, 1934	Elizabeth, New Jersey, U.S.	
6	Win	4–0–2	Johnny Riccaduli	PTS	6	Feb 27, 1934	Elks Club, Elizabeth, New Jersey, U.S.	
5	Draw	3–0–2	Johnny Riccaduli	PTS	6	Nov 10, 1933	Elizabeth, New Jersey, U.S.	
4	Draw	3–0–1	Frank Orlando	PTS	6	Sep 1, 1933	Elizabeth, New Jersey, U.S.	
3	Win	3–0	Denny Boyle	KO	2 (4)	Aug 29, 1933	Star A.C., Elizabeth, New Jersey, U.S.	
2	Win	2–0	Tommy Mack	KO	1 (?)	Jul 26, 1933	Elizabeth, New Jersey, U.S.	
1	Win	1–0	Steve Petronick	PTS	4	Jun 4, 1933	Elizabeth, New Jersey, U.S.	

=== Unofficial record ===
117 fights	72 wins	37 losses
By knockout	26	5
By decision	46	32
Draws	8	

Record with the inclusion of newspaper decisions in the win/loss/draw column.

No.	Result	Record	Opponent	Type	Round	Date	Location	Notes
117	Loss	72–37–8	Marty Servo	KO	4 (15)	Feb 1, 1946	Madison Square Garden, New York City, New York, U.S.	Lost NYSAC, NBA, and The Ring welterweight titles
116	Loss	72–36–8	Rocky Graziano	KO	10 (10)	Aug 24, 1945	Madison Square Garden, New York City, New York, U.S.	
115	Win	72–35–8	Lou Miller	KO	3 (10)	Jul 17, 1945	Lyric Theater, Knoxville, Tennessee, U.S.	
114	Loss	71–35–8	Rocky Graziano	KO	10 (10)	Jun 29, 1945	Madison Square Garden, New York City, New York, U.S.	
113	Win	71–34–8	Alex Doyle	TKO	2 (10)	Jun 13, 1945	Blue Hen Arena, Wilmington, Delaware, U.S.	
112	Win	70–34–8	Eddie Miller	KO	2 (10)	Jun 11, 1945	City Auditorium, Atlanta, Georgia, U.S.	
111	Win	69–34–8	Al Stanley	KO	2 (?)	Jun 9, 1945	Municipal Auditorium, Aiken, South Carolina, U.S.	
110	Win	68–34–8	Jimmy Mazzio	KO	2 (10)	Jun 8, 1945	Jacksonville, North Carolina, U.S.	
109	Win	67–34–8	Pete Lello	KO	2 (10)	Jun 1, 1945	Jacksonville, Florida, U.S.	
108	Loss	66–34–8	Fritzie Zivic	UD	10	Sep 10, 1942	Madison Square Garden, New York City, New York, U.S.	
107	Loss	66–33–8	Garvey Young	SD	10	May 8, 1942	Boston Garden, Boston, Massachusetts, U.S.	
106	Win	66–32–8	Bobby Britton	SD	10	Dec 19, 1941	Biscayne Fronton, Miami, Florida, U.S.	
105	Win	65–32–8	Lew Jenkins	UD	10	Oct 6, 1941	Madison Square Garden, New York City, New York, U.S.	
104	Win	64–32–8	Fritzie Zivic	PTS	15	Jun 29, 1941	Ruppert Stadium, Newark, New Jersey, U.S.	Won NYSAC, NBA, and The Ring welterweight titles
103	Win	63–32–8	Frank Fariello	KO	3 (10)	Jun 27, 1941	Municipal Stadium, Long Branch, New Jersey, U.S.	
102	Win	62–32–8	Rego Dell	PTS	8	Apr 23, 1941	Raritan Auditorium, Perth Amboy, New Jersey, U.S.	
101	Win	61–32–8	Oscar Poindexter	KO	2 (8)	Mar 20, 1941	Waltz Dream Arena, Atlantic City, New Jersey, U.S.	
100	Win	60–32–8	Joe De Jesus	KO	1 (8)	Mar 5, 1941	Raritan Auditorium, Perth Amboy, New Jersey, U.S.	
99	Win	59–32–8	Ray Powell	TKO	3 (8)	Feb 27, 1941	Waltz Dream Arena, Atlantic City, New Jersey, U.S.	
98	Win	58–32–8	Norman Rubio	PTS	8	Feb 5, 1941	Raritan Auditorium, Perth Amboy, New Jersey, U.S.	
97	Win	57–32–8	Norman Rubio	PTS	10	Jan 13, 1941	Laurel Garden, Newark, New Jersey, U.S.	
96	Win	56–32–8	Joe De Jesus	PTS	8	Dec 30, 1940	Laurel Garden, Newark, New Jersey, U.S.	
95	Win	55–32–8	Vince Delia	KO	3 (8)	Dec 16, 1940	Arena, Trenton, New Jersey, U.S.	
94	Loss	54–32–8	Norman Rubio	PTS	10	Nov 25, 1940	Laurel Garden, Newark, New Jersey, U.S.	
93	Win	54–31–8	Norman Rubio	PTS	10	Oct 21, 1940	Laurel Garden, Newark, New Jersey, U.S.	
92	Win	53–31–8	Bobby Masters	KO	5 (10)	Sep 16, 1940	Meadowbrook Bowl, Newark, New Jersey, U.S.	
91	Win	52–31–8	Mickey Makar	KO	4 (12)	Jul 8, 1940	Meadowbrook Bowl, Newark, New Jersey, U.S.	
90	Win	51–31–8	Maurice Arnault	TKO	5 (10)	Jun 25, 1940	Meadowbrook Bowl, Newark, New Jersey, U.S.	
89	Win	50–31–8	Dave Chacon	PTS	10	May 23, 1940	Armory, Elizabeth, New Jersey, U.S.	
88	Win	49–31–8	Dave Chacon	PTS	10	Apr 12, 1940	Armory, Elizabeth, New Jersey, U.S.	
87	Draw	48–31–8	Billy Beauhuld	PTS	10	Mar 18, 1940	Laurel Garden, Newark, New Jersey, U.S.	
86	Win	48–31–7	Larry Mangine	TKO	3 (10)	Mar 11, 1940	Arena, Trenton, New Jersey, U.S.	
85	Loss	47–31–7	Mike Kaplan	PTS	8	Feb 23, 1940	Madison Square Garden, New York City, New York, U.S.	
84	Win	47–30–7	Norman Hurdman	PTS	8	Jan 18, 1940	Coliseum, Baltimore, Maryland, U.S.	
83	Win	46–30–7	Julio Gonzales	PTS	10	Oct 9, 1939	Laurel Garden, Newark, New Jersey, U.S.	
82	Win	45–30–7	Tony Martin	PTS	10	Jul 31, 1939	Meadowbrook Bowl, Newark, New Jersey, U.S.	
81	Win	44–30–7	Lou Fortuna	PTS	10	Nov 26, 1939	Meadowbrook Bowl, Newark, New Jersey, U.S.	
80	Win	43–30–7	Lou Fortuna	PTS	8	May 8, 1939	Laurel Garden, Newark, New Jersey, U.S.	
79	Win	42–30–7	Eddie Brink	PTS	10	Apr 24, 1939	Laurel Garden, Newark, New Jersey, U.S.	
78	Loss	41–30–7	Mike Piskin	PTS	10	Apr 10, 1939	Laurel Garden, Newark, New Jersey, U.S.	
77	Win	41–29–7	Tony Maglione	PTS	8	Mar 27, 1939	Arena, Trenton, New Jersey, U.S.	
76	Loss	40–29–7	Billy Beauhuld	PTS	10	Feb 27, 1939	Laurel Garden, Newark, New Jersey, U.S.	
75	Win	40–28–7	Ray Napolitano	TKO	4 (10)	Feb 6, 1939	Laurel Garden, Newark, New Jersey, U.S.	
74	Win	39–28–7	Lou Lombardi	PTS	8	Dec 26, 1938	Laurel Garden, Newark, New Jersey, U.S.	
73	Loss	38–28–7	Paulie Walker	TKO	5 (10)	Oct 10, 1938	Arena, Trenton, New Jersey, U.S.	
72	Loss	38–27–7	Tippy Larkin	PTS	15	Aug 29, 1938	Meadowbrook Bowl, Newark, New Jersey, U.S.	
71	Win	38–26–7	Pete Mascia	TKO	3 (8)	Aug 23, 1938	Elizabeth, New Jersey, U.S.	Mascia suffered a dislocated shoulder
70	Win	37–26–7	Phil Baker	PTS	8	Aug 9, 1938	Meadowbrook Bowl, Newark, New Jersey, U.S.	
69	Win	36–26–7	Jack Kid Berg	PTS	10	Jul 25, 1938	Meadowbrook Bowl, Newark, New Jersey, U.S.	
68	Loss	35–26–7	Tippy Larkin	PTS	10	Jul 5, 1938	Meadowbrook Bowl, Newark, New Jersey, U.S.	
67	Win	35–25–7	Larry Mangine	KO	1 (10)	Jun 6, 1938	Arena, Trenton, New Jersey, U.S.	
66	Draw	34–25–7	Eddie Alzek	PTS	8	May 9, 1938	Belmont Park, Garfield, New Jersey, U.S.	
65	Win	34–25–6	Stumpy Jacobs	PTS	10	Apr 8, 1938	Auditorium, Wilmington, Delaware, U.S.	
64	Win	33–25–6	Maxie Fisher	PTS	8	Apr 4, 1938	Laurel Garden, Newark, New Jersey, U.S.	
63	Win	32–25–6	Mickey Duca	MD	10	Mar 3, 1938	Auditorium, Wilmington, Delaware, U.S.	
62	Win	31–25–6	Johnny Rohrig	PTS	8	Feb 24, 1938	Armory, Passaic, New Jersey, U.S.	
61	Draw	30–25–6	Mickey Duca	PTS	8	Feb 17, 1938	Auditorium, Wilmington, Delaware, U.S.	
60	Win	30–25–5	Tommy Speigal	PTS	10	Nov 30, 1937	Coliseum, Coral Gables, Florida, U.S.	
59	Loss	29–25–5	Mike Piskin	PTS	10	Nov 22, 1937	Laurel Garden, Newark, New Jersey, U.S.	
58	Loss	29–24–5	Norment Quarles	PTS	10	Nov 8, 1937	City Auditorium, Richmond, Virginia, U.S.	
57	Win	29–23–5	Tommy Speigal	PTS	10	Oct 25, 1937	City Auditorium, Richmond, Virginia, U.S.	
56	Draw	28–23–5	Tommy Speigal	PTS	10	Oct 4, 1937	City Auditorium, Richmond, Virginia, U.S.	
55	Win	28–23–4	Bucky Keyes	KO	2 (?)	Sep 21, 1937	Elizabeth, New Jersey, U.S.	
54	Loss	27–23–4	Pedro Montañez	KO	2 (10)	Aug 16, 1937	Braddock Bowl, Jersey City, New Jersey, U.S.	
53	Loss	27–22–4	Ralph Vona	NWS	6	Aug 10, 1937	East Broad Street Arena, Elizabeth, New Jersey, U.S.	
52	Win	27–21–4	Ralph Vona	PTS	6	Aug 3, 1937	East Broad Street Arena, Elizabeth, New Jersey, U.S.	
51	Loss	26–21–4	Tippy Larkin	PTS	10	Jul 2, 1937	Ocean View A.A., Long Branch, New Jersey, U.S.	
50	Loss	26–20–4	Tony Morgano	PTS	10	Jun 28, 1937	Arena Stadium, Philadelphia, Pennsylvania, U.S.	
49	Win	26–19–4	Johnny Alba	KO	3 (?)	Jun 15, 1937	Elizabeth, New Jersey, U.S.	
48	Loss	25–19–4	Freddie Miller	PTS	8	Jun 7, 1937	Dexter Park Arena, Woodhaven, Queens, New York City, New York, U.S.	
47	Loss	25–18–4	Tippy Larkin	PTS	10	May 24, 1937	Ollemar Field, Irvington, New Jersey, U.S.	
46	Loss	25–17–4	Irving Eldridge	PTS	8	May 18, 1937	New York Coliseum, Bronx, New York City, New York, U.S.	
45	Loss	25–16–4	Tippy Larkin	PTS	9	Mar 22, 1937	Laurel Garden, Newark, New Jersey, U.S.	
44	Loss	25–15–4	Eddie Cool	PTS	10	Feb 19, 1937	Cambria A.C., Philadelphia, Pennsylvania, U.S.	
43	Loss	25–14–4	Benny Bass	PTS	10	Jan 22, 1937	Cambria A.C., Philadelphia, Pennsylvania, U.S.	
42	Loss	25–13–4	Irving Eldridge	PTS	10	Dec 3, 1936	Armory, Newark, New Jersey, U.S.	
41	Loss	25–12–4	Charley Gomer	PTS	8	Nov 3, 1936	New York Coliseum, Bronx, New York City, New York, U.S.	
40	Win	25–11–4	Pete Mascia	PTS	10	Oct 19, 1936	Laurel Garden, Newark, New Jersey, U.S.	
39	Loss	24–11–4	Phil Baker	PTS	10	Sep 29, 1936	Braddock Bowl, Jersey City, New Jersey, U.S.	
38	Loss	24–10–4	Enrico Venturi	PTS	10	Sep 1, 1936	Braddock Bowl, Jersey City, New Jersey, U.S.	
37	Loss	24–9–4	Maxie Fisher	PTS	10	Jul 21, 1936	Meadowbrook Bowl, Newark, New Jersey, U.S.	
36	Loss	24–8–4	Al Roth	PTS	10	Jun 29, 1936	Meadowbrook Bowl, Newark, New Jersey, U.S.	
35	Win	24–7–4	Al Gillette	PTS	10	May 4, 1936	Laurel Garden, Newark, New Jersey, U.S.	
34	Loss	23–7–4	Lew Feldman	PTS	8	Apr 9, 1936	St. Nicholas Arena, New York City, New York, U.S.	
33	Win	23–6–4	Johnny Jadick	PTS	10	Feb 24, 1936	Laurel Garden, Newark, New Jersey, U.S.	
32	Win	22–6–4	George Levy	PTS	10	Jan 27, 1936	Laurel Garden, Newark, New Jersey, U.S.	
31	Win	21–6–4	Maxie Fisher	PTS	10	Dec 9, 1935	Laurel Garden, Newark, New Jersey, U.S.	
30	Loss	20–6–4	Aldo Spoldi	PTS	8	Nov 8, 1935	Chicago Stadium, Chicago, Illinois, U.S.	
29	Loss	20–5–4	Maxie Fisher	PTS	10	Oct 28, 1935	Laurel Garden, Newark, New Jersey, U.S.	
28	Draw	20–4–4	Mickey Page	PTS	10	Oct 7, 1935	Laurel Garden, Newark, New Jersey, U.S.	
27	Loss	20–4–3	Lew Massey	PTS	10	Sep 16, 1935	Laurel Garden, Newark, New Jersey, U.S.	
26	Win	20–3–3	Frankie Warno	TKO	8 (8)	Sep 9, 1935	Arena, Trenton, New Jersey, U.S.	
25	Loss	19–3–3	Lew Monte	PTS	6	Jul 10, 1935	Elizabeth, New Jersey, U.S.	
24	Win	19–2–3	Mickey Cohen	KO	2 (10)	Jun 11, 1935	Nutley Velodrome, Nutley, New Jersey, U.S.	
23	Win	18–2–3	Mickey Greb	NWS	4	May 27, 1935	East Broad Street Arena, Elizabeth, New Jersey, U.S.	
22	Win	17–2–3	Al Roth	PTS	8	May 6, 1935	Laurel Garden, Newark, New Jersey, U.S.	
21	Win	16–2–3	Julie Katz	PTS	8	Mar 25, 1935	Laurel Garden, Newark, New Jersey, U.S.	
20	Draw	15–2–3	Joe Ardito	PTS	6	May 3, 1935	Elizabeth, New Jersey, U.S.	Date and location undetermined
19	Win	15–2–2	Joe Vacchiano	NWS	6	Feb 18, 1935	Laurel Garden, Newark, New Jersey, U.S.	
18	Win	14–2–2	Johnny Riccaduli	NWS	6	Feb 5, 1935	Union County AA, Elizabeth, New Jersey, U.S.	
17	Win	13–2–2	Chang Collura	KO	3 (6)	Jan 22, 1935	Moose Hall, Elizabeth, New Jersey, U.S.	
16	Loss	12–2–2	Chang Collura	PTS	6	Jan 7, 1935	Laurel Garden, Newark, New Jersey, U.S.	
15	Loss	12–1–2	Emil Calcagni	PTS	6	Dec 20, 1934	Teterboro Airdrome, Hasbrouck Heights, New Jersey, U.S.	
14	Win	12–0–2	Joe Ardito	PTS	6	Oct 8, 1934	Laurel Garden, Newark, New Jersey, U.S.	
13	Win	11–0–2	Lew Greenberg	KO	4 (?)	Sep 26, 1934	Newark, New Jersey, U.S.	
12	Win	10–0–2	Ernie Tackett	PTS	5	Sep 11, 1934	Union County AA, Elizabeth, New Jersey, U.S.	
11	Win	9–0–2	Paddy Gordon	NWS	6	Aug 21, 1934	Union County AA, Elizabeth, New Jersey, U.S.	
10	Win	8–0–2	Paddy Gordon	PTS	6	Aug 12, 1934	Elizabeth, New Jersey, U.S.	Date approximate
9	Win	7–0–2	Jackie Corcoran	PTS	6	Jul 31, 1934	Elizabeth, New Jersey, U.S.	
8	Win	6–0–2	Jackie Corcoran	PTS	6	Jul 17, 1934	Elizabeth, New Jersey, U.S.	
7	Win	5–0–2	Marvin Hart	PTS	6	Jul 7, 1934	Elizabeth, New Jersey, U.S.	Not the Marvin Hart who was world heavyweight champion
6	Win	4–0–2	Johnny Riccaduli	PTS	6	Feb 27, 1934	Elks Club, Elizabeth, New Jersey, U.S.	
5	Draw	3–0–2	Johnny Riccaduli	PTS	6	Nov 10, 1933	Elizabeth, New Jersey, U.S.	
4	Draw	3–0–1	Frank Orlando	PTS	6	Sep 1, 1933	Elizabeth, New Jersey, U.S.	
3	Win	3–0	Denny Boyle	KO	2 (4)	Aug 29, 1933	Star A.C., Elizabeth, New Jersey, U.S.	
2	Win	2–0	Tommy Mack	KO	1 (?)	Jul 26, 1933	Elizabeth, New Jersey, U.S.	
1	Win	1–0	Steve Petronick	PTS	4	Jun 4, 1933	Elizabeth, New Jersey, U.S.	

== Titles in boxing ==
=== Major world titles ===
- NYSAC welterweight champion (147 lbs)
- NBA (WBA) welterweight champion (147 lbs)

=== The Ring magazine titles ===
- The Ring welterweight champion (147 lbs)

=== Undisputed titles ===
- Undisputed welterweight champion

== See also ==
- List of welterweight boxing champions

Sporting positions
World boxing titles
Preceded by Fritzie Zivic	NYSAC welterweight champion July 29, 1941 – February 1, 1946	Succeeded by Marty Servo
Preceded by Fritzie Zivic	NBA welterweight champion July 29, 1941 – February 1, 1946	Succeeded by Marty Servo
Preceded by Fritzie Zivic	The Ring welterweight champion July 29, 1941 – February 1, 1946	Succeeded by Marty Servo
Preceded by Fritzie Zivic	Undisputed welterweight champion July 29, 1941 – February 1, 1946	Succeeded by Marty Servo
