= Nutley Velodrome =

Former cycling track in Nutley, New Jersey

- Location: Park Avenue; Nutley, New Jersey
- Owner: Joseph Miele
- Capacity: 12,000
- Surface: Wood (Track); Grass (Infield)

Construction
- Groundbreaking: 1933
- Opened: 1933
- Demolished: 1942

Tenants
- Various cycling events (1933–1937); Midget auto races (1938–1940)

The Nutley Velodrome was a cycling track in Nutley, Essex County, New Jersey, United States.

== History ==
The Nutley Velodrome was the brainchild of East Orange entrepreneur Joseph Miele, who moved to fill the gap left behind by the closure of the Newark Velodrome. Following the 1930 closure of the velodrome in Newark, he sought to rekindle interest in cycle sport with a new track in Nutley, New Jersey.

In 1924, Miele acquired a site previously known as the Joyce Quarry and started dumping construction and demolition debris there from his business. Years later, he planned a new use for the site.

The board of commissioners for the Township of Nutley led by Mayor Walter F. Reinheimer, approved Miele's plan on April 18, 1933, to build a cycling track on the 12-acre (4.9 ha) lot. A groundbreaking ceremony marked the start of the velodrome's construction on the next day. The 1/7-mile wooden track featured steep 45-degree turns and seating for 12,000.

Joseph Miele was the founding president of Nutley Velodrome, Inc. Sports promoter Harry Mendel was named general manager of the velodrome in May 1933, while the track was still under construction. Having previously served as vice president and GM of the Woodbridge Speedway, Mendel announced twice-weekly races that included both motor-paced and bicycle events with top professionals, amateurs, and motor-paced riders.

The Nutley Velodrome, built for bicycle racing, opened on June 4, 1933. The seven-lap wooden track was situated on Park Avenue in Nutley, between Washington Avenue and River Road, with space for 2,000 parked cars. Races took place on Sunday afternoons and Wednesday evenings. The original ticket price of 55 cents was lowered to 40 cents, with programs sold for an additional 10 cents.

The 1933 season opener drew a standing-room-only crowd of 12,000 cycling fans. The inauguration day showcased a 25-mile motor-paced event with 6 riders, which included France's Alfred Letourneur, Italy's Giovanni Maners, Newark's Charley Jaeger, Belgium's Gerard Debaets, Germany's Frans Deulberg, and Brooklyn's Paul Croley. In addition to a mile sprint race, there were three other professional races and three amateur events on the card.

Riders from around the world were drawn to the velodrome. International star Franco Giorgetti's first appearance at the velodrome took place in April 1934.

A disagreement between Miele and Harry Mendel over signing top international riders caused a rift in their alliance just before the start of the 1935 season. Mendel left to promote his own racing events at Coney Island Velodrome.

The 1935 season at Nutley began on April 14 with a 22-event program arranged by owner Joe Miele, featuring more than 200 professional and amateur cyclists. By summer, Miele and Harry Mendel ended their feud, agreed to exchange riders, and collaborated in championship races, serving as consultants at each other's tracks for the rest of the season.

For the 1936 season scheduled for a start on April 12, Miele announced that Harry Mendel was appointed assistant manager and publicity director. Mendel's final show at the Nutley Velodrome was held on July 15, 1936. Joseph Miele stepped away from management to focus on business and leased out the track's operations.

Control of Nutley Velodrome, Inc., shifted on July 15, 1936, to a syndicate of six men. Among them were Edward J. Malone of Verona and Australian cyclist Alf Goullet, who leased the track for three years with a five-year renewal option. Opening the 1936 season, a 25-mile motor-paced event featured top professional riders, including Franco Giorgetti, Alfred Letourneur, Bobby Walthour, Mike De Filipo, and Martin Journey.

Interest in bicycle racing faded as automobiles became more popular, leading to financial difficulties and poor attendance at the Nutley track. The track shut down during the 1937 season.

=== Midget car racing ===
Town commissioners granted a license to Jack Kochman of Eastern Speedway Inc. on December 17, 1937, allowing him to run Midget auto races. On April 3, 1938, the Nutley Velodrome hosted its first midget auto race, attracting 8,000 fans. On opening day, Chicago's Paul Russo captured the main event of the AAA midget race program.

During the track's two seasons of midget racing, three drivers — Charlie Helliker, Henry Guerand, and Karl Hattel — lost their lives, and several others were injured. During a five-mile main event in August 1939, Los Angeles midget automobile racer Karl Hattel lost control of his car and crashed twice into a guardrail. Due to growing concern following Hattel's fatal crash, midget racing was suspended at the track, and Nutley residents later voted to permanently end auto-racing events in November 1939.

Unable to revive bicycle races, the Nutley Velodrome was closed in 1940. The building was torn down in February 1942 after Miele obtained a demolition permit. The site of the old velodrome was later converted into a public park known as Glotzbach Memorial Park.

=== Other sports ===
Since its construction, the Nutley Velodrome was mainly used for cycling. The velodrome added boxing matches to its events in summer 1935. Victor J. Brown and Jack Friedlander leased the facility, with Babe Culnan serving as matchmaker. Their premiere card on June 10th featured a main event of Lou Halper vs. Tony Fisher with Freddie Cochrane vs. Mickey Cohen as the co-main. After a riot ensued following Halper vs. Fisher, boxing bouts were temporarily prohibited in Nutley by an ordinance passed on August 6, 1935.

== See also ==
- Newark Velodrome
- New York Velodrome
- Coney Island Velodrome
