= Obie Walker =

American boxer

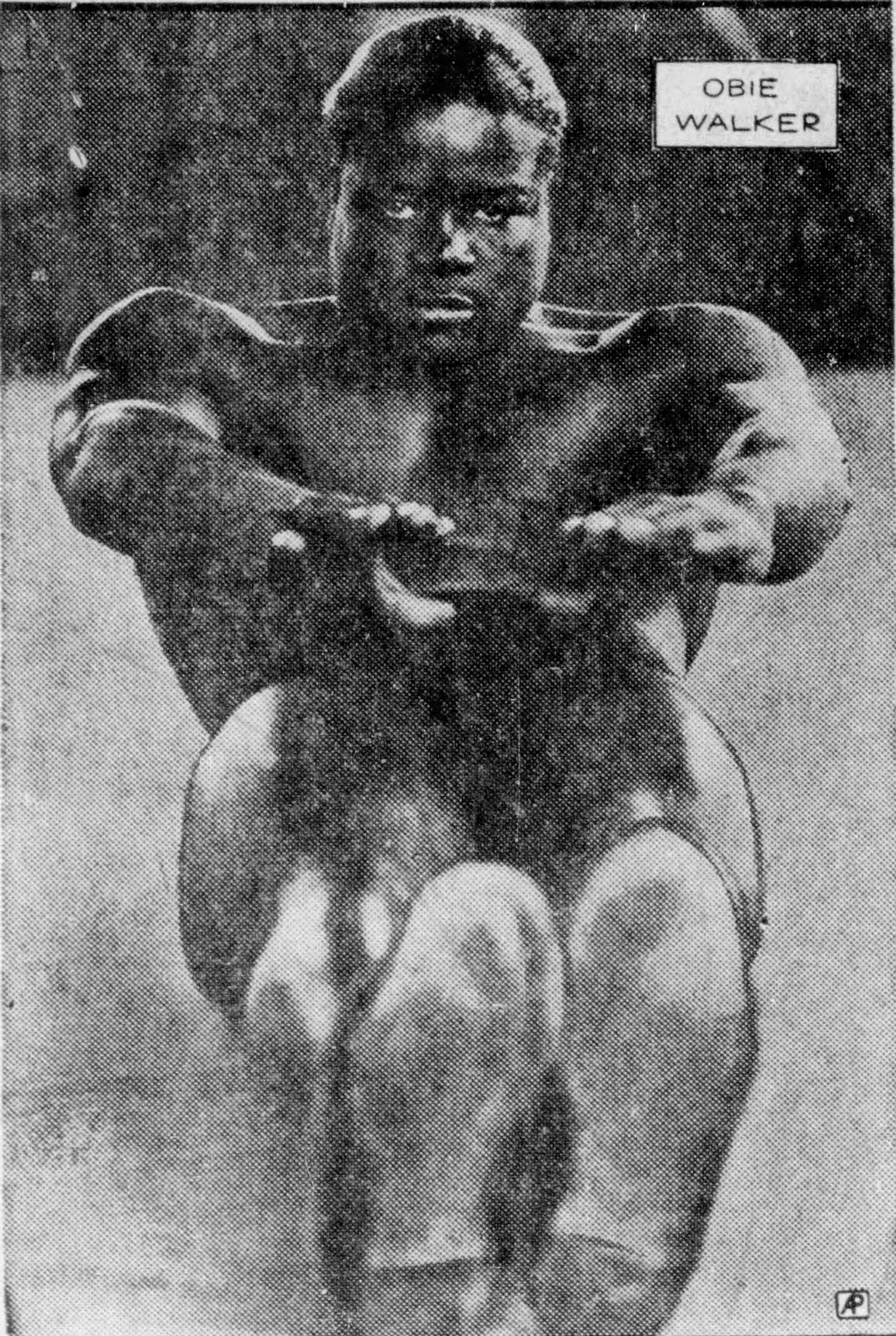
- Walker c. 1935

Personal information
- Nickname: Bearcat Obie
- Nationality: American
- Born: Obie Dia Walker; September 19, 1911 Cochran, Georgia
- Died: May 23, 1989 (aged 77) Atlanta, Georgia
- Height: 5 ft 9 in (1.75 m)
- Weight: Heavyweight

Boxing career
- Stance: Orthodox

Boxing record
- Total fights: 124; with the inclusion of newspaper decisions
- Wins: 93
- Win by KO: 62
- Losses: 20
- Draws: 8
- No contests: 1

Obie Walker (September 19, 1911 – May 23, 1989), born Obie Dia Walker in Cochran, Georgia, was a professional boxer. Walker was the penultimate World Colored Heavyweight Champion from October 9, 1933, when he out-decisioned title holder George Godfrey in a 10-round fight at the Arena in Philadelphia, Pennsylvania, to July 20, 1935, when he lost the title on a decision in a 15-round bout to former colored heavyweight champ Larry Gains in Tigers Rugby Stadium, Leicester, England.

A heavyweight contender of the 1930s, he was avoided by many boxers. Sportswriter Ed Danforth praised the "Bearcat" in the Atlanta Georgian in a column published on July 5, 1938:

"Walker became the toast of Paris. He knocked cold every topnotcher he met on the continent. Max Schmeling shrewdly dodged him, the best of the Englishmen too, sidestepped the squatty brown man who carried lightning bolts in both fists. Competent critics say he could have knocked out Schmeling, Joe Louis and Jim Braddock in one night within the space of 10 rounds."

Though short, Walker was quick on his feet, could take a punch on the chin, and was a strong puncher. Among the top heavyweight contenders he defeated was Two-Ton Tony Galento, who fought Joe Louis for the heavyweight championship. It was Louis's long reign as champ that ended the World Colored Heavyweight Title.

In his career, Walker won 77 fights (53 by K.O.) and lost 16, with 5 draws. He was never K.O.'ed himself.

== Legacy and honors ==
In 2020 award-winning author Mark Allen Baker published the first comprehensive account of The World Colored Heavyweight Championship, 1876–1937, with McFarland & Company, a leading independent publisher of academic & nonfiction books. This history traces the advent and demise of the Championship, the stories of the talented professional athletes who won it, and the demarcation of the color line both in and out of the ring.

For decades the World Colored Heavyweight Championship was a useful tool to combat racial oppression—the existence of the title a leverage mechanism, or tool, used as a technique to counter a social element, "drawing the color line."

== Professional boxing record ==
All information in this section is derived from BoxRec, unless otherwise stated.

=== Official record ===
124 fights	92 wins	18 losses
By knockout	62	0
By decision	30	17
By disqualification	0	1
Draws	7	
No contests	3	
Newspaper decisions/draws	4	

All newspaper decisions are officially regarded as “no decision” bouts and are not counted in the win/loss/draw column.

No.	Result	Record	Opponent	Type	Round, time	Date	Location	Notes
124	Loss	92–18–7 (7)	Elza Thompson	PTS	10	Mar 19, 1946	Dorsey Park, Miami, Florida, U.S.	
123	Loss	92–17–7 (7)	Elmer Ray	UD	10	Jun 24, 1941	City Auditorium, Galveston, Texas, U.S.	
122	Win	92–16–7 (7)	Frank Lumpkin	SD	10	May 1, 1940	Memorial Stadium, Columbus, Georgia, U.S.	
121	Loss	91–16–7 (7)	Elmer Ray	PTS	10	Apr 1, 1940	Tinker Field, Orlando, Florida, U.S.	
120	Loss	91–15–7 (7)	Elmer Ray	PTS	12	Mar 7, 1940	Dorsey Park, Miami, Florida, U.S.	
119	Loss	91–14–7 (7)	Henry Taylor	UD	10	Feb 1, 1940	Dorsey Park, Miami, Florida, U.S.	
118	Loss	91–13–7 (7)	Elmer Ray	PTS	10	Dec 4, 1939	Township Auditorium, Columbia, South Carolina, U.S.	
117	Win	91–12–7 (7)	Jimmy Harvey	KO	2 (8)	Nov 7, 1939	Textile Hall, Greenville, South Carolina, U.S.	
116	Win	90–12–7 (7)	Leroy Haynes	UD	10	Jun 19, 1939	Ponce de Leon Ballpark, Atlanta, Georgia, U.S.	
115	Loss	89–12–7 (7)	Elmer Ray	NWS	10	Apr 13, 1939	City Auditorium, Birmingham, Alabama, U.S.	
114	Win	89–12–7 (6)	Leroy Haynes	PTS	15	Mar 16, 1939	City Park Arena, Miami, Florida, U.S.	
113	Win	88–12–7 (6)	Leroy Haynes	SD	10	Mar 2, 1939	City Park Arena, Miami, Florida, U.S.	
112	Loss	87–12–7 (6)	Elmer Ray	NWS	10	Feb 23, 1939	City Auditorium, Birmingham, Alabama, U.S.	
111	Win	87–12–7 (5)	Tiger Jack Wright	KO	12 (15), (2:25)	Nov 30, 1938	City Auditorium, Galveston, Texas, U.S.	Billed for the Texas state colored heavyweight title
110	Win	86–12–7 (5)	Jack Thompson	KO	3 (8)	Nov 16, 1938	City Auditorium, Birmingham, Alabama, U.S.	
109	Win	85–12–7 (5)	Charlie Harvey	KO	2 (8)	Oct 27, 1938	City Auditorium, Birmingham, Alabama, U.S.	
108	Win	84–12–7 (5)	Elmer Ray	TKO	6 (10)	Oct 3, 1938	Warren Arena, Atlanta, Georgia, U.S.	
107	Win	83–12–7 (5)	Elmer Ray	PTS	10	Sep 15, 1938	Township Auditorium, Columbia, South Carolina, U.S.	
106	Win	82–12–7 (5)	Jack Ward	TKO	3 (10)	Aug 29, 1938	Warren Arena, Atlanta, Georgia, U.S.	
105	Win	81–12–7 (5)	Oscar Jenkins	KO	10 (10)	Jul 13, 1938	Fort Benning, Georgia, U.S.	Jenkins died of injuries sustained from the fight.
104	Loss	80–12–7 (5)	Jim Howell	PTS	10	Jun 30, 1938	Center Brick Warehouse, Darlington, South Carolina, U.S.	
103	Win	80–11–7 (5)	Otto McCall	PTS	10	Jun 10, 1938	Center Brick Warehouse, Darlington, South Carolina, U.S.	
102	Win	79–11–7 (5)	Edward Winston Jr.	KO	5 (10)	May 19, 1938	Ponce de Leon Ballpark, Atlanta, Georgia, U.S.	
101	Loss	78–11–7 (5)	Elmer Ray	PTS	10	Apr 27, 1938	City Park Arena, Miami, Florida, U.S.	
100	Win	78–10–7 (5)	Charley Douglas	TKO	4 (10)	Apr 6, 1938	City Park Arena, Miami, Florida, U.S.	
99	Win	77–10–7 (5)	Edward Winston Jr.	TKO	5 (10)	Mar 30, 1938	Lincoln Park Arena, West Palm Beach, Florida, U.S.	
98	Draw	76–10–7 (5)	Edward Winston Jr.	PTS	10	Mar 23, 1938	N.W. Second Avenue Arena, Miami, Florida, U.S.	
97	Loss	76–10–6 (5)	Jim Howell	PTS	10	Mar 1, 1938	Municipal Auditorium, Saint Louis, Missouri, U.S.	
96	Loss	76–9–6 (5)	Jack Trammell	PTS	10	Jan 18, 1938	Municipal Auditorium, Saint Louis, Missouri, U.S.	
95	Win	76–8–6 (5)	Al Caldwell	KO	3 (10)	Dec 2, 1937	Township Auditorium, Columbia, South Carolina, U.S.	
94	Win	75–8–6 (5)	Al Hart	KO	2 (10)	Nov 18, 1937	Spring Street Arena, Atlanta, Georgia, U.S.	
93	Win	74–8–6 (5)	Simpson Tolliver	KO	4 (10)	Oct 11, 1937	Township Auditorium, Columbia, South Carolina, U.S.	
92	Win	73–8–6 (5)	Otto McCall	RTD	4 (10)	Sep 16, 1937	Township Auditorium, Columbia, South Carolina, U.S.	
91	Win	72–8–6 (5)	Jack Rose	KO	1 (10)	Aug 31, 1937	Municipal Auditorium, Macon, Georgia, U.S.	
90	Win	71–8–6 (5)	Jesse Caldwell	KO	4 (10)	Aug 24, 1937	Municipal Auditorium, Macon, Georgia, U.S.	
89	Win	70–8–6 (5)	Jesse Caldwell	KO	3 (10)	Jul 26, 1937	Municipal Auditorium, Macon, Georgia, U.S.	
88	NC	69–8–6 (5)	Elmer Ray	NC	6 (10)	Apr 20, 1937	N.W. Second Avenue Arena, Miami, Florida, U.S.	Bout called off after Ray refused to continue from an accidental low blow
87	Win	69–8–6 (4)	Elmer Ray	TKO	6 (10)	Mar 25, 1937	Lincoln Park Arena, West Palm Beach, Florida, U.S.	
86	Draw	68–8–6 (4)	Elmer Ray	PTS	10	Mar 18, 1937	Johnson Street Arena, Daytona Beach, Florida, U.S.	
85	Win	68–8–5 (4)	Shorty Ahearn	PTS	10	Mar 15, 1937	Lincoln Park Arena, West Palm Beach, Florida, U.S.	
84	Win	67–8–5 (4)	Jesse Caldwell	TKO	4 (10)	Mar 2, 1937	N.W. Second Avenue Arena, Miami, Florida, U.S.	
83	Win	66–8–5 (4)	Black Eagle	KO	1 (10)	Feb 23, 1937	N.W. Second Avenue Arena, Miami, Florida, U.S.	
82	Win	65–8–5 (4)	Speedy Jackson	KO	3 (10)	Feb 1, 1937	Johnson Street Arena, Daytona Beach, Florida, U.S.	
81	Win	64–8–5 (4)	Elmer Ray	PTS	10	Jan 26, 1937	N.W. Second Avenue Arena, Miami, Florida, U.S.	
80	Draw	63–8–5 (4)	Elmer Ray	PTS	10	Jan 19, 1937	Second Avenue Arena, Miami, Florida, U.S.	
79	Loss	63–8–4 (4)	Willie Reddish	PTS	4	Sep 22, 1936	Municipal Stadium, Philadelphia, Pennsylvania, U.S.	
78	Loss	63–7–4 (4)	Jack London	PTS	10	Jun 15, 1936	Welford Road Stadium, Leicester, England	
77	Win	63–6–4 (4)	Maurice Strickland	PTS	10	Feb 9, 1936	The Ring, Blackfriars Road, Southwark, England	
76	Win	62–6–4 (4)	Norman Baines	PTS	12	Jan 27, 1936	Colston Hall, Bristol, England	
75	Win	61–6–4 (4)	Don McCorkindale	PTS	10	Nov 11, 1935	The Ring, Blackfriars Road, Southwark, England	
74	Win	60–6–4 (4)	Gustave Limousin	KO	5 (10)	Oct 5, 1935	Palais des Sports, Paris, France	
73	Loss	59–6–4 (4)	Larry Gains	PTS	15	Jul 20, 1935	Welford Road Stadium, Leicester, England	Lost world colored heavyweight title
72	Win	59–5–4 (4)	George Cook	PTS	10	May 8, 1935	White City, England	
71	Win	58–5–4 (4)	Rodolfo Valenti	TKO	5 (8)	Mar 26, 1935	Velodrome d'Hiver, Paris, France	
70	Win	57–5–4 (4)	Albert Di Meglio	KO	8 (10)	Mar 15, 1935	Salle Wagram, Paris, France	
69	Win	56–5–4 (4)	Arthur Meurant	TKO	1 (10), (0:45)	Feb 15, 1935	Salle Wagram, Paris, France	
68	Win	55–5–4 (4)	Otto von Porat	UD	10	Nov 17, 1934	Palais des Expositions, Geneva, Switzerland	
67	Loss	54–5–4 (4)	Gustave Limousin	PTS	8	Oct 29, 1934	Palais des Sports, Paris, France	
66	Win	54–4–4 (4)	Hans Schönrath	RTD	5 (8)	Sep 13, 1934	Palais des Sports, Paris, France	
65	Win	53–4–4 (4)	Emil Scholz	TKO	1 (8)	Sep 3, 1934	Stade Roland Garros, Paris, France	
64	Win	52–4–4 (4)	Giuseppe Sanga	KO	1 (8)	Jul 25, 1934	Stade Roland Garros, Paris, France	
63	Win	51–4–4 (4)	Italo Colonello	TKO	2 (8)	Jul 11, 1934	Stade Roland Garros, Paris, France	
62	Win	50–4–4 (4)	Saverio Grizzo	TKO	2 (10)	Jun 2, 1934	Pavillon des Sports, Montreux, Switzerland	
61	Win	49–4–4 (4)	Saverio Grizzo	KO	2 (10)	Apr 7, 1934	Palais des Expositions, Geneva, Switzerland	
60	Win	48–4–4 (4)	Maurice Griselle	RTD	7 (10)	Mar 2, 1934	Salle Wagram, Paris, France	
59	Win	47–4–4 (4)	Casimir Beszterda	KO	2 (10)	Feb 19, 1934	Palais des Sports, Paris, France	
58	Win	46–4–4 (4)	Louis Verbeeren	KO	1 (10)	Feb 2, 1934	Salle Wagram, Paris, France	
57	Loss	45–4–4 (4)	Don "Red" Barry	PTS	10	Nov 27, 1933	Arena, Philadelphia, Pennsylvania, U.S.	Not to be confused with Don "Red" Barry
56	Win	45–3–4 (4)	George Godfrey	PTS	10	Oct 9, 1933	Arena, Philadelphia, Pennsylvania, U.S.	Won world colored heavyweight title
55	Win	44–3–4 (4)	Salvatore Ruggirello	TKO	3 (6)	Sep 27, 1933	Shibe Park, Philadelphia, Pennsylvania, U.S.	
54	Win	43–3–4 (4)	Humberto Arce	PTS	6	Sep 4, 1933	Convention Hall, Atlantic City, New Jersey, U.S.	
53	Win	42–3–4 (4)	Sailor Jack Vernon	KO	1 (8)	Aug 22, 1933	Shellpot Park, Wilmington, Delaware, U.S.	
52	NC	41–3–4 (4)	Humberto Arce	NC	9 (10)	Aug 17, 1933	Paterson, New Jersey, U.S.	Fight stopped for "stalling"
51	Win	41–3–4 (3)	Mickey Taylor	TKO	2 (10)	Jul 20, 1933	Paterson, New Jersey, U.S.	
50	Win	40–3–4 (3)	Leonard Dixon	TKO	2 (6)	Jun 29, 1933	Leiperville Arena, Leiperville, Pennsylvania, U.S.	
49	Win	39–3–4 (3)	Tony Galento	PTS	10	Apr 17, 1933	Arena, Philadelphia, Pennsylvania, U.S.	
48	Win	38–3–4 (3)	Meyer K.O. Christner	TKO	4 (10)	Mar 13, 1933	Arena, Philadelphia, Pennsylvania, U.S.	
47	Win	37–3–4 (3)	Joe Doctor	KO	2 (8)	Feb 13, 1933	Arena, Philadelphia, Pennsylvania, U.S.	
46	Win	36–3–4 (3)	Larry Crabtree	TKO	3 (6)	Jan 30, 1933	Arena, Philadelphia, Pennsylvania, U.S.	
45	Win	35–3–4 (3)	Humberto Arce	PTS	8	Dec 12, 1932	Arena, Boston, Massachusetts, U.S.	
44	Win	34–3–4 (3)	Frankie Simms	TKO	6 (6)	Nov 4, 1932	Arena, Boston, Massachusetts, U.S.	
43	Win	33–3–4 (3)	Red Tom	KO	4 (10)	Aug 22, 1932	Roby's Arena, Atlanta, Georgia, U.S.	
42	Win	32–3–4 (3)	Willie Bush	PTS	12	Jul 25, 1932	Municipal Auditorium, Atlanta, Georgia, U.S.	
41	Win	31–3–4 (3)	Ed "Bearcat" Wright	PTS	10	Apr 15, 1932	Legion Arena, Lake Worth, Florida, U.S.	
40	Win	30–3–4 (3)	Tiger Henderson	KO	5 (10)	Apr 12, 1932	City Park Arena, Miami, Florida, U.S.	
39	Draw	29–3–4 (3)	Ed "Bearcat" Wright	PTS	10	Apr 5, 1932	City Park Arena, Miami, Florida, U.S.	
38	Win	29–3–3 (3)	Ed "Bearcat" Wright	PTS	10	Mar 22, 1932	City Park Arena, Miami, Florida, U.S.	
37	Win	28–3–3 (3)	Willie Bush	KO	7 (10)	Mar 15, 1932	City Park Arena, Miami, Florida, U.S.	
36	Draw	27–3–3 (3)	Willie Bush	PTS	10	Mar 2, 1932	Lincoln Park Arena, West Palm Beach, Florida, U.S.	
35	Win	27–3–2 (3)	Tiger Henderson	KO	8 (10)	Feb 26, 1932	City Park Arena, Miami, Florida, U.S.	
34	Win	26–3–2 (3)	Big Boy Burlap	TKO	6 (10)	Feb 17, 1932	City Park Arena, Miami, Florida, U.S.	
33	Win	25–3–2 (3)	Big Boy Burlap	PTS	8	Jan 15, 1932	Thames Arena, New London, Connecticut, U.S.	
32	Win	24–3–2 (3)	Eddie Cox	KO	1 (4), 2:17	Dec 21, 1931	New York Coliseum, New York City, New York, U.S.	
31	Win	23–3–2 (3)	Ted Coolidge	TKO	4 (8)	Nov 20, 1931	Thames Arena, New London, Connecticut, U.S.	
30	Win	22–3–2 (3)	K.O. Brown	KO	? (10)	Sep 14, 1931	Municipal Auditorium, Macon, Georgia, U.S.	
29	Win	21–3–2 (3)	Seldom Heard	KO	3 (10)	Aug 31, 1931	Roby's Arena, Atlanta, Georgia, U.S.	
28	NC	20–3–2 (3)	Willie McGee	NC	7 (10)	Aug 12, 1931	Benjamin Field Arena, Tampa, Florida, U.S.	
27	Win	20–3–2 (2)	Roy Clark	PTS	10	Jul 27, 1931	Roby's Arena, Atlanta, Georgia, U.S.	
26	Win	19–3–2 (2)	George Cheatham	KO	1 (10)	Jul 20, 1931	Roby's Arena, Atlanta, Georgia, U.S.	
25	Draw	18–3–2 (2)	Willie Bush	PTS	10	Jun 22, 1931	Roby's Arena, Atlanta, Georgia, U.S.	
24	Win	18–3–1 (2)	Willie Bush	PTS	10	May 20, 1931	City Park Arena, Miami, Florida, U.S.	
23	Loss	17–3–1 (2)	Willie Bush	PTS	10	Apr 30, 1931	Dixie Theatre, West Palm Beach, Florida, U.S.	
22	Win	17–2–1 (2)	Al Walker	PTS	10	Apr 24, 1931	Municipal Auditorium, Atlanta, Georgia, U.S.	
21	Win	16–2–1 (2)	Al Walker	TKO	7 (10)	Apr 9, 1931	Tinker Field, Orlando, Florida, U.S.	
20	Win	15–2–1 (2)	Seldom Heard	KO	?	Mar 26, 1931	West Palm Beach, Florida, U.S.	Exact date unknown in March
19	Draw	14–2–1 (2)	Seldom Heard	PTS	10	Mar 18, 1931	City Park Arena, Miami, Florida, U.S.	
18	Win	14–2 (2)	Al Walker	PTS	10	Mar 11, 1931	City Park Arena, Miami, Florida, U.S.	
17	Win	13–2 (2)	Bob Lawson	PTS	10	Mar 6, 1931	Legion Arena, Lake Worth, Florida, U.S.	
16	Win	12–2 (2)	Willie McGee	PTS	10	Feb 23, 1931	Punch Bowl, Orlando, Florida, U.S.	
15	Loss	11–2 (2)	Willie Bush	DQ	2 (10)	Feb 5, 1931	Dixie Theatre, West Palm Beach, Florida, U.S.	Walker DQ'd for hitting Bush after a knockdown
14	Win	11–1 (2)	Bob Lawson	PTS	10	Jan 28, 1931	City Park Arena, Miami, Florida, U.S.	
13	Draw	10–1 (2)	Bob Lawson	NWS	10	Dec 31, 1930	Troy, Alabama, U.S.	
12	Win	10–1 (1)	Willie McGee	KO	7 (10)	Dec 17, 1930	City Park Arena, Miami, Florida, U.S.	
11	Win	9–1 (1)	Bob Lawson	NWS	10	Dec 8, 1930	City Auditorium, Montgomery, Alabama, U.S.	
10	Win	9–1	Edward Winston Jr.	KO	4 (10)	Nov 5, 1930	City Park Arena, Miami, Florida, U.S.	
9	Win	8–1	Speedy Freeman	RTD	3 (6)	Jun 17, 1930	Municipal Auditorium, Atlanta, Georgia, U.S.	
8	Win	7–1	Charlie King	KO	6 (6)	May 23, 1930	81 Theatre, Atlanta, Georgia, U.S.	
7	Loss	6–1	Happy Hunter	PTS	10	Feb 3, 1930	Atlanta Theater, Atlanta, Georgia, U.S.	
6	Win	6–0	Speedy Freeman	TKO	2 (6)	Dec 27, 1929	Municipal Auditorium, Atlanta, Georgia, U.S.	
5	Win	5–0	Battling Bell	KO	3 (?)	Jul 1, 1929	Roby's Gymnasium, Atlanta, Georgia, U.S.	
4	Win	4–0	Sam Jones	TKO	1 (4)	Jun 7, 1929	Municipal Auditorium, Atlanta, Georgia, U.S.	
3	Win	3–0	Battling Cornell	PTS	4	Apr 2, 1929	Municipal Auditorium, Atlanta, Georgia, U.S.	
2	Win	2–0	Battling Cornell	TKO	5 (6)	Mar 26, 1929	Municipal Auditorium, Macon, Georgia, U.S.	
1	Win	1–0	Battling Cornell	PTS	4	Feb 15, 1929	Municipal Auditorium, Atlanta, Georgia, U.S.	

=== Unofficial record ===
124 fights	93 wins	20 losses
By knockout	62	0
By decision	31	19
By disqualification	0	1
Draws	8	
No contests	3	

Record with the inclusion of newspaper decisions in the win/loss/draw column.

No.	Result	Record	Opponent	Type	Round	Date	Location	Notes
124	Loss	93–20–8 (3)	Elza Thompson	PTS	10	Mar 19, 1946	Dorsey Park, Miami, Florida, U.S.	
123	Loss	93–19–8 (3)	Elmer Ray	UD	10	Jun 24, 1941	City Auditorium, Galveston, Texas, U.S.	
122	Win	93–18–8 (3)	Frank Lumpkin	SD	10	May 1, 1940	Memorial Stadium, Columbus, Georgia, U.S.	
121	Loss	92–18–8 (3)	Elmer Ray	PTS	10	Apr 1, 1940	Tinker Field, Orlando, Florida, U.S.	
120	Loss	92–17–8 (3)	Elmer Ray	PTS	12	Mar 7, 1940	Dorsey Park, Miami, Florida, U.S.	
119	Loss	92–16–8 (3)	Henry Taylor	UD	10	Feb 1, 1940	Dorsey Park, Miami, Florida, U.S.	
118	Loss	92–15–8 (3)	Elmer Ray	PTS	10	Dec 4, 1939	Township Auditorium, Columbia, South Carolina, U.S.	
117	Win	92–14–8 (3)	Jimmy Harvey	KO	2 (8)	Nov 7, 1939	Textile Hall, Greenville, South Carolina, U.S.	
116	Win	91–14–8 (3)	Leroy Haynes	UD	10	Jun 19, 1939	Ponce de Leon Ballpark, Atlanta, Georgia, U.S.	
115	Loss	90–14–8 (3)	Elmer Ray	NWS	10	Apr 13, 1939	City Auditorium, Birmingham, Alabama, U.S.	
114	Win	90–13–8 (3)	Leroy Haynes	PTS	15	Mar 16, 1939	City Park Arena, Miami, Florida, U.S.	
113	Win	89–13–8 (3)	Leroy Haynes	SD	10	Mar 2, 1939	City Park Arena, Miami, Florida, U.S.	
112	Loss	88–13–8 (3)	Elmer Ray	NWS	10	Feb 23, 1939	City Auditorium, Birmingham, Alabama, U.S.	
111	Win	88–12–8 (3)	Tiger Jack Wright	KO	12 (15), (2:25)	Nov 30, 1938	City Auditorium, Galveston, Texas, U.S.	Billed for the Texas state colored heavyweight title
110	Win	87–12–8 (3)	Jack Thompson	KO	3 (8)	Nov 16, 1938	City Auditorium, Birmingham, Alabama, U.S.	
109	Win	86–12–8 (3)	Charlie Harvey	KO	2 (8)	Oct 27, 1938	City Auditorium, Birmingham, Alabama, U.S.	
108	Win	85–12–8 (3)	Elmer Ray	TKO	6 (10)	Oct 3, 1938	Warren Arena, Atlanta, Georgia, U.S.	
107	Win	84–12–8 (3)	Elmer Ray	PTS	10	Sep 15, 1938	Township Auditorium, Columbia, South Carolina, U.S.	
106	Win	83–12–8 (3)	Jack Ward	TKO	3 (10)	Aug 29, 1938	Warren Arena, Atlanta, Georgia, U.S.	
105	Win	82–12–8 (3)	Oscar Jenkins	KO	10 (10)	Jul 13, 1938	Fort Benning, Georgia, U.S.	Jenkins died of injuries sustained from the fight.
104	Loss	81–12–8 (3)	Jim Howell	PTS	10	Jun 30, 1938	Center Brick Warehouse, Darlington, South Carolina, U.S.	
103	Win	81–11–8 (3)	Otto McCall	PTS	10	Jun 10, 1938	Center Brick Warehouse, Darlington, South Carolina, U.S.	
102	Win	80–11–8 (3)	Edward Winston Jr.	KO	5 (10)	May 19, 1938	Ponce de Leon Ballpark, Atlanta, Georgia, U.S.	
101	Loss	79–11–8 (3)	Elmer Ray	PTS	10	Apr 27, 1938	City Park Arena, Miami, Florida, U.S.	
100	Win	79–10–8 (3)	Charley Douglas	TKO	4 (10)	Apr 6, 1938	City Park Arena, Miami, Florida, U.S.	
99	Win	78–10–8 (3)	Edward Winston Jr.	TKO	5 (10)	Mar 30, 1938	Lincoln Park Arena, West Palm Beach, Florida, U.S.	
98	Draw	77–10–8 (3)	Edward Winston Jr.	PTS	10	Mar 23, 1938	N.W. Second Avenue Arena, Miami, Florida, U.S.	
97	Loss	77–10–7 (3)	Jim Howell	PTS	10	Mar 1, 1938	Municipal Auditorium, Saint Louis, Missouri, U.S.	
96	Loss	77–9–7 (3)	Jack Trammell	PTS	10	Jan 18, 1938	Municipal Auditorium, Saint Louis, Missouri, U.S.	
95	Win	77–8–7 (3)	Al Caldwell	KO	3 (10)	Dec 2, 1937	Township Auditorium, Columbia, South Carolina, U.S.	
94	Win	76–8–7 (3)	Al Hart	KO	2 (10)	Nov 18, 1937	Spring Street Arena, Atlanta, Georgia, U.S.	
93	Win	75–8–7 (3)	Simpson Tolliver	KO	4 (10)	Oct 11, 1937	Township Auditorium, Columbia, South Carolina, U.S.	
92	Win	74–8–7 (3)	Otto McCall	RTD	4 (10)	Sep 16, 1937	Township Auditorium, Columbia, South Carolina, U.S.	
91	Win	73–8–7 (3)	Jack Rose	KO	1 (10)	Aug 31, 1937	Municipal Auditorium, Macon, Georgia, U.S.	
90	Win	72–8–7 (3)	Jesse Caldwell	KO	4 (10)	Aug 24, 1937	Municipal Auditorium, Macon, Georgia, U.S.	
89	Win	71–8–7 (3)	Jesse Caldwell	KO	3 (10)	Jul 26, 1937	Municipal Auditorium, Macon, Georgia, U.S.	
88	NC	70–8–7 (3)	Elmer Ray	NC	6 (10)	Apr 20, 1937	N.W. Second Avenue Arena, Miami, Florida, U.S.	Bout called off after Ray refused to continue from an accidental low blow
87	Win	70–8–7 (2)	Elmer Ray	TKO	6 (10)	Mar 25, 1937	Lincoln Park Arena, West Palm Beach, Florida, U.S.	
86	Draw	69–8–7 (2)	Elmer Ray	PTS	10	Mar 18, 1937	Johnson Street Arena, Daytona Beach, Florida, U.S.	
85	Win	69–8–6 (2)	Shorty Ahearn	PTS	10	Mar 15, 1937	Lincoln Park Arena, West Palm Beach, Florida, U.S.	
84	Win	68–8–6 (2)	Jesse Caldwell	TKO	4 (10)	Mar 2, 1937	N.W. Second Avenue Arena, Miami, Florida, U.S.	
83	Win	67–8–6 (2)	Black Eagle	KO	1 (10)	Feb 23, 1937	N.W. Second Avenue Arena, Miami, Florida, U.S.	
82	Win	66–8–6 (2)	Speedy Jackson	KO	3 (10)	Feb 1, 1937	Johnson Street Arena, Daytona Beach, Florida, U.S.	
81	Win	65–8–6 (2)	Elmer Ray	PTS	10	Jan 26, 1937	N.W. Second Avenue Arena, Miami, Florida, U.S.	
80	Draw	64–8–6 (2)	Elmer Ray	PTS	10	Jan 19, 1937	Second Avenue Arena, Miami, Florida, U.S.	
79	Loss	64–8–5 (2)	Willie Reddish	PTS	4	Sep 22, 1936	Municipal Stadium, Philadelphia, Pennsylvania, U.S.	
78	Loss	64–7–5 (2)	Jack London	PTS	10	Jun 15, 1936	Welford Road Stadium, Leicester, England	
77	Win	64–6–5 (2)	Maurice Strickland	PTS	10	Feb 9, 1936	The Ring, Blackfriars Road, Southwark, England	
76	Win	63–6–5 (2)	Norman Baines	PTS	12	Jan 27, 1936	Colston Hall, Bristol, England	
75	Win	62–6–5 (2)	Don McCorkindale	PTS	10	Nov 11, 1935	The Ring, Blackfriars Road, Southwark, England	
74	Win	61–6–5 (2)	Gustave Limousin	KO	5 (10)	Oct 5, 1935	Palais des Sports, Paris, France	
73	Loss	60–6–5 (2)	Larry Gains	PTS	15	Jul 20, 1935	Welford Road Stadium, Leicester, England	Lost world colored heavyweight title
72	Win	60–5–5 (2)	George Cook	PTS	10	May 8, 1935	White City, England	
71	Win	59–5–5 (2)	Rodolfo Valenti	TKO	5 (8)	Mar 26, 1935	Velodrome d'Hiver, Paris, France	
70	Win	58–5–5 (2)	Albert Di Meglio	KO	8 (10)	Mar 15, 1935	Salle Wagram, Paris, France	
69	Win	57–5–5 (2)	Arthur Meurant	TKO	1 (10), (0:45)	Feb 15, 1935	Salle Wagram, Paris, France	
68	Win	56–5–5 (2)	Otto von Porat	UD	10	Nov 17, 1934	Palais des Expositions, Geneva, Switzerland	
67	Loss	55–5–5 (2)	Gustave Limousin	PTS	8	Oct 29, 1934	Palais des Sports, Paris, France	
66	Win	55–4–5 (2)	Hans Schönrath	RTD	5 (8)	Sep 13, 1934	Palais des Sports, Paris, France	
65	Win	54–4–5 (2)	Emil Scholz	TKO	1 (8)	Sep 3, 1934	Stade Roland Garros, Paris, France	
64	Win	53–4–5 (2)	Giuseppe Sanga	KO	1 (8)	Jul 25, 1934	Stade Roland Garros, Paris, France	
63	Win	52–4–5 (2)	Italo Colonello	TKO	2 (8)	Jul 11, 1934	Stade Roland Garros, Paris, France	
62	Win	51–4–5 (2)	Saverio Grizzo	TKO	2 (10)	Jun 2, 1934	Pavillon des Sports, Montreux, Switzerland	
61	Win	50–4–5 (2)	Saverio Grizzo	KO	2 (10)	Apr 7, 1934	Palais des Expositions, Geneva, Switzerland	
60	Win	49–4–5 (2)	Maurice Griselle	RTD	7 (10)	Mar 2, 1934	Salle Wagram, Paris, France	
59	Win	48–4–5 (2)	Casimir Beszterda	KO	2 (10)	Feb 19, 1934	Palais des Sports, Paris, France	
58	Win	47–4–5 (2)	Louis Verbeeren	KO	1 (10)	Feb 2, 1934	Salle Wagram, Paris, France	
57	Loss	46–4–5 (2)	Don "Red" Barry	PTS	10	Nov 27, 1933	Arena, Philadelphia, Pennsylvania, U.S.	Not to be confused with Don "Red" Barry
56	Win	46–3–5 (2)	George Godfrey	PTS	10	Oct 9, 1933	Arena, Philadelphia, Pennsylvania, U.S.	Won world colored heavyweight title
55	Win	45–3–5 (2)	Salvatore Ruggirello	TKO	3 (6)	Sep 27, 1933	Shibe Park, Philadelphia, Pennsylvania, U.S.	
54	Win	44–3–5 (2)	Humberto Arce	PTS	6	Sep 4, 1933	Convention Hall, Atlantic City, New Jersey, U.S.	
53	Win	43–3–5 (2)	Sailor Jack Vernon	KO	1 (8)	Aug 22, 1933	Shellpot Park, Wilmington, Delaware, U.S.	
52	NC	42–3–5 (2)	Humberto Arce	NC	9 (10)	Aug 17, 1933	Paterson, New Jersey, U.S.	Fight stopped for "stalling"
51	Win	42–3–5 (1)	Mickey Taylor	TKO	2 (10)	Jul 20, 1933	Paterson, New Jersey, U.S.	
50	Win	41–3–5 (1)	Leonard Dixon	TKO	2 (6)	Jun 29, 1933	Leiperville Arena, Leiperville, Pennsylvania, U.S.	
49	Win	40–3–5 (1)	Tony Galento	PTS	10	Apr 17, 1933	Arena, Philadelphia, Pennsylvania, U.S.	
48	Win	39–3–5 (1)	Meyer K.O. Christner	TKO	4 (10)	Mar 13, 1933	Arena, Philadelphia, Pennsylvania, U.S.	
47	Win	38–3–5 (1)	Joe Doctor	KO	2 (8)	Feb 13, 1933	Arena, Philadelphia, Pennsylvania, U.S.	
46	Win	37–3–5 (1)	Larry Crabtree	TKO	3 (6)	Jan 30, 1933	Arena, Philadelphia, Pennsylvania, U.S.	
45	Win	36–3–5 (1)	Humberto Arce	PTS	8	Dec 12, 1932	Arena, Boston, Massachusetts, U.S.	
44	Win	35–3–5 (1)	Frankie Simms	TKO	6 (6)	Nov 4, 1932	Arena, Boston, Massachusetts, U.S.	
43	Win	34–3–5 (1)	Red Tom	KO	4 (10)	Aug 22, 1932	Roby's Arena, Atlanta, Georgia, U.S.	
42	Win	33–3–5 (1)	Willie Bush	PTS	12	Jul 25, 1932	Municipal Auditorium, Atlanta, Georgia, U.S.	
41	Win	32–3–5 (1)	Ed "Bearcat" Wright	PTS	10	Apr 15, 1932	Legion Arena, Lake Worth, Florida, U.S.	
40	Win	31–3–5 (1)	Tiger Henderson	KO	5 (10)	Apr 12, 1932	City Park Arena, Miami, Florida, U.S.	
39	Draw	30–3–5 (1)	Ed "Bearcat" Wright	PTS	10	Apr 5, 1932	City Park Arena, Miami, Florida, U.S.	
38	Win	30–3–4 (1)	Ed "Bearcat" Wright	PTS	10	Mar 22, 1932	City Park Arena, Miami, Florida, U.S.	
37	Win	29–3–4 (1)	Willie Bush	KO	7 (10)	Mar 15, 1932	City Park Arena, Miami, Florida, U.S.	
36	Draw	28–3–4 (1)	Willie Bush	PTS	10	Mar 2, 1932	Lincoln Park Arena, West Palm Beach, Florida, U.S.	
35	Win	28–3–3 (1)	Tiger Henderson	KO	8 (10)	Feb 26, 1932	City Park Arena, Miami, Florida, U.S.	
34	Win	27–3–3 (1)	Big Boy Burlap	TKO	6 (10)	Feb 17, 1932	City Park Arena, Miami, Florida, U.S.	
33	Win	26–3–3 (1)	Big Boy Burlap	PTS	8	Jan 15, 1932	Thames Arena, New London, Connecticut, U.S.	
32	Win	25–3–3 (1)	Eddie Cox	KO	1 (4), 2:17	Dec 21, 1931	New York Coliseum, New York City, New York, U.S.	
31	Win	24–3–3 (1)	Ted Coolidge	TKO	4 (8)	Nov 20, 1931	Thames Arena, New London, Connecticut, U.S.	
30	Win	23–3–3 (1)	K.O. Brown	KO	? (10)	Sep 14, 1931	Municipal Auditorium, Macon, Georgia, U.S.	
29	Win	22–3–3 (1)	Seldom Heard	KO	3 (10)	Aug 31, 1931	Roby's Arena, Atlanta, Georgia, U.S.	
28	NC	21–3–3 (1)	Willie McGee	NC	7 (10)	Aug 12, 1931	Benjamin Field Arena, Tampa, Florida, U.S.	
27	Win	21–3–3	Roy Clark	PTS	10	Jul 27, 1931	Roby's Arena, Atlanta, Georgia, U.S.	
26	Win	20–3–3	George Cheatham	KO	1 (10)	Jul 20, 1931	Roby's Arena, Atlanta, Georgia, U.S.	
25	Draw	19–3–3	Willie Bush	PTS	10	Jun 22, 1931	Roby's Arena, Atlanta, Georgia, U.S.	
24	Win	19–3–2	Willie Bush	PTS	10	May 20, 1931	City Park Arena, Miami, Florida, U.S.	
23	Loss	18–3–2	Willie Bush	PTS	10	Apr 30, 1931	Dixie Theatre, West Palm Beach, Florida, U.S.	
22	Win	18–2–2	Al Walker	PTS	10	Apr 24, 1931	Municipal Auditorium, Atlanta, Georgia, U.S.	
21	Win	17–2–2	Al Walker	TKO	7 (10)	Apr 9, 1931	Tinker Field, Orlando, Florida, U.S.	
20	Win	16–2–2	Seldom Heard	KO	?	Mar 26, 1931	West Palm Beach, Florida, U.S.	Exact date unknown in March
19	Draw	15–2–2	Seldom Heard	PTS	10	Mar 18, 1931	City Park Arena, Miami, Florida, U.S.	
18	Win	15–2–1	Al Walker	PTS	10	Mar 11, 1931	City Park Arena, Miami, Florida, U.S.	
17	Win	14–2–1	Bob Lawson	PTS	10	Mar 6, 1931	Legion Arena, Lake Worth, Florida, U.S.	
16	Win	13–2–1	Willie McGee	PTS	10	Feb 23, 1931	Punch Bowl, Orlando, Florida, U.S.	
15	Loss	12–2–1	Willie Bush	DQ	2 (10)	Feb 5, 1931	Dixie Theatre, West Palm Beach, Florida, U.S.	Walker DQ'd for hitting Bush after a knockdown
14	Win	12–1–1	Bob Lawson	PTS	10	Jan 28, 1931	City Park Arena, Miami, Florida, U.S.	
13	Draw	11–1–1	Bob Lawson	NWS	10	Dec 31, 1930	Troy, Alabama, U.S.	
12	Win	11–1	Willie McGee	KO	7 (10)	Dec 17, 1930	City Park Arena, Miami, Florida, U.S.	
11	Win	10–1	Bob Lawson	NWS	10	Dec 8, 1930	City Auditorium, Montgomery, Alabama, U.S.	
10	Win	9–1	Edward Winston Jr.	KO	4 (10)	Nov 5, 1930	City Park Arena, Miami, Florida, U.S.	
9	Win	8–1	Speedy Freeman	RTD	3 (6)	Jun 17, 1930	Municipal Auditorium, Atlanta, Georgia, U.S.	
8	Win	7–1	Charlie King	KO	6 (6)	May 23, 1930	81 Theatre, Atlanta, Georgia, U.S.	
7	Loss	6–1	Happy Hunter	PTS	10	Feb 3, 1930	Atlanta Theater, Atlanta, Georgia, U.S.	
6	Win	6–0	Speedy Freeman	TKO	2 (6)	Dec 27, 1929	Municipal Auditorium, Atlanta, Georgia, U.S.	
5	Win	5–0	Battling Bell	KO	3 (?)	Jul 1, 1929	Roby's Gymnasium, Atlanta, Georgia, U.S.	
4	Win	4–0	Sam Jones	TKO	1 (4)	Jun 7, 1929	Municipal Auditorium, Atlanta, Georgia, U.S.	
3	Win	3–0	Battling Cornell	PTS	4	Apr 2, 1929	Municipal Auditorium, Atlanta, Georgia, U.S.	
2	Win	2–0	Battling Cornell	TKO	5 (6)	Mar 26, 1929	Municipal Auditorium, Macon, Georgia, U.S.	
1	Win	1–0	Battling Cornell	PTS	4	Feb 15, 1929	Municipal Auditorium, Atlanta, Georgia, U.S.	

Awards and achievements
Preceded by George Godfrey	World Colored Heavyweight Champion; October 9, 1933 – July 20, 1935	Succeeded by Larry Gains
