= Elmer Ray =

American boxer (1911–1987)

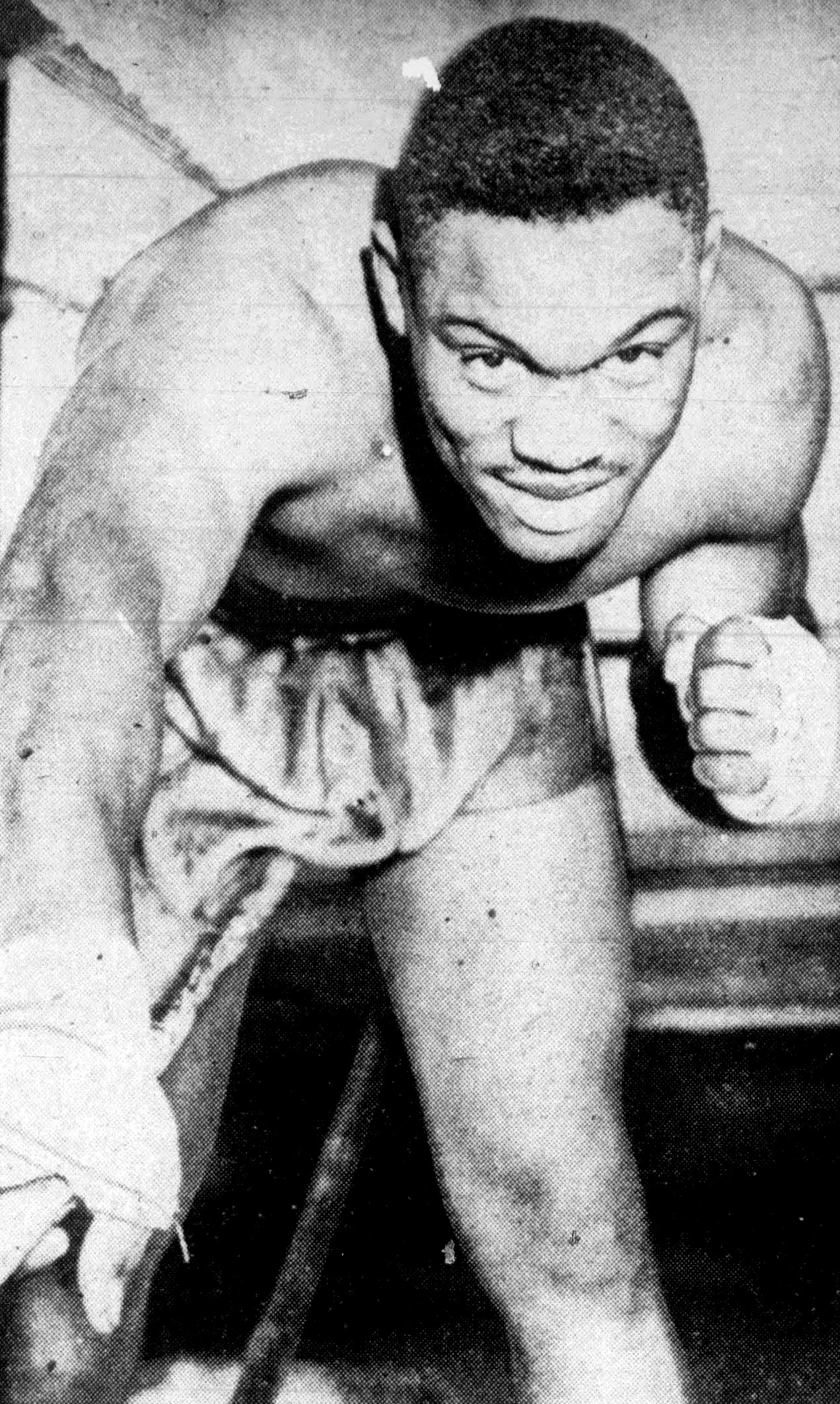

Personal information
- Nicknames: Kid Violent; Violent; The Florida Thumper
- Nationality: American
- Born: Elmo John Ray; March 3, 1911 Hastings, Florida
- Died: May 20, 1987 (aged 76)
- Height: 6 ft 2 in (1.88 m)
- Weight: Heavyweight

Boxing career
- Stance: Orthodox

Boxing record
- Total fights: 135; with the inclusion of newspaper decisions
- Wins: 98
- Win by KO: 69
- Losses: 23
- Draws: 11
- No contests: 1

Elmer "Violent" Ray (March 3, 1911 – May 20, 1987) was an American professional boxer who fought from 1933 to 1949. Ray, also known as "The Florida Thumper," was one of the hardest-hitting heavyweights of the 1940s. During a boxing career that included battle royals and alligator wrestling, he scored 69 knockouts. Ray never fought for the title, but did fight multiple exhibition bouts against Joe Louis. He also fought Jersey Joe Walcott, Lee Savold, and Ezzard Charles. In 2003, Ray made The Ring magazine's list of 100 greatest punchers of all-time at No. 44.

== Professional boxing record ==
All information in this section is derived from BoxRec, unless otherwise stated.

=== Official record ===
135 fights	96 wins	23 losses
By knockout	69	9
By decision	27	12
By disqualification	0	2
Draws	11	
No contests	3	
Newspaper decisions/draws	2	

All newspaper decisions are officially regarded as “no decision” bouts and are not counted in the win/loss/draw column.

No.	Result	Record	Opponent	Type	Round, time	Date	Location	Notes
135	Loss	96–23–11 (5)	John Holman	KO	8 (10), 1:37	Mar 8, 1949	Dorsey Park, Miami, Florida, US	
134	Loss	96–22–11 (5)	Kid Riviera	UD	10	Feb 22, 1949	Kiel Auditorium, Saint Louis, Missouri, US	
133	Win	96–21–11 (5)	Sid Peaks	KO	9 (10), 2:55	Feb 8, 1949	Dorsey Park, Miami, Florida, US	
132	Win	95–21–11 (5)	Tex Boddie	KO	4 (10)	Jan 11, 1949	Dorsey Park, Miami, Florida, US	
131	Loss	94–21–11 (5)	Ezzard Charles	KO	9 (10), 2:43	May 7, 1948	Chicago Stadium, Chicago, Illinois, US	
130	Win	94–20–11 (5)	Al Smith	TKO	3 (10)	Mar 26, 1948	Dorsey Park, Miami, Florida, US	
129	Win	93–20–11 (5)	Sandy McPherson	KO	5 (10), 2:05	Mar 16, 1948	Dorsey Park, Miami, Florida, US	
128	Win	92–20–11 (5)	Willie Brown	KO	4 (10), 2:18	Mar 2, 1948	Dorsey Park, Miami, Florida, US	
127	Win	91–20–11 (5)	Ezzard Charles	SD	10	Jul 25, 1947	Madison Square Garden, New York City, New York, US	
126	Win	90–20–11 (5)	Howard Chard	TKO	7 (10), 2:55	Jul 14, 1947	MacArthur Stadium, Syracuse, New York, US	
125	Win	89–20–11 (5)	Pete Louthis	KO	2 (10), 2:37	Jul 8, 1947	MacArthur Stadium, Syracuse, New York, US	
124	Win	88–20–11 (5)	Colion Chaney	KO	3 (10), 0:50	Jun 30, 1947	Century Stadium, West Springfield, Massachusetts, US	
123	Loss	87–20–11 (5)	Jersey Joe Walcott	MD	10	Mar 4, 1947	Orange Bowl, Miami, Florida, US	
122	Win	87–19–11 (5)	George Parks	TKO	2 (10)	Feb 6, 1947	Dorsey Park, Miami, Florida, US	
121	Win	86–19–11 (5)	Jersey Joe Walcott	SD	10	Nov 15, 1946	Madison Square Garden, New York City, New York, US	
120	Win	85–19–11 (5)	Clifford Mann	KO	2 (10), 1:12	Nov 4, 1946	Valley Arena, Holyoke, Massachusetts, US	
119	Win	84–19–11 (5)	George Parks	KO	3 (10)	Oct 25, 1946	Rainbo Arena, Chicago, Illinois, US	
118	Win	83–19–11 (5)	Earl Lowman	RTD	2 (10)	Oct 15, 1946	Auditorium, Saint Paul, Minnesota, US	
117	Win	82–19–11 (5)	Lee Savold	KO	2 (10), 1:39	Aug 28, 1946	Ebbets Field, New York City, New York, US	
116	Win	81–19–11 (5)	George Fitch	TKO	5 (10), 1:43	Aug 5, 1946	Century Stadium, West Springfield, Massachusetts, US	
115	Win	80–19–11 (5)	Larry Lane	KO	2 (10), 2:35	Jul 23, 1946	Zivic Arena, Millvale, Pennsylvania, US	
114	Win	79–19–11 (5)	Earl Lowman	KO	3 (10)	Jul 1, 1946	Century Stadium, West Springfield, Massachusetts, US	
113	Win	78–19–11 (5)	Vern Escoe	KO	3 (10)	Jun 17, 1946	Coliseum, Baltimore, Maryland, US	
112	Win	77–19–11 (5)	Art McAlpine	TKO	9 (10), 0:12	Jun 3, 1946	Century Stadium, West Springfield, Massachusetts, US	
111	Win	76–19–11 (5)	Colion Chaney	KO	1 (10), 1:00	Apr 15, 1946	Coliseum, Baltimore, Maryland, US	
110	Win	75–19–11 (5)	Dixie Oliver	KO	1 (10)	Apr 2, 1946	Dorsey Park, Miami, Florida, US	
109	Win	74–19–11 (5)	Hubert Hood	TKO	4 (12)	Mar 19, 1946	Dorsey Park, Miami, Florida, US	
108	Win	73–19–11 (5)	Al Patterson	KO	3 (10)	Mar 5, 1946	Dorsey Park, Miami, Florida, US	
107	Win	72–19–11 (5)	Dan Merritt	KO	4 (10)	Feb 19, 1946	Dorsey Park, Miami, Florida, US	
106	Win	71–19–11 (5)	Grant Shade	KO	1 (10), 1:45	Dec 10, 1945	Bismarck, North Dakota, US	
105	Win	70–19–11 (5)	Cyclone Lynch	KO	1 (10)	Dec 6, 1945	City Auditorium, Galveston, Texas, US	
104	Win	69–19–11 (5)	Grant Shade	KO	2 (10), 1:25	Nov 29, 1945	City Auditorium, Galveston, Texas, US	
103	Win	68–19–11 (5)	Hubert Hood	PTS	10	Oct 19, 1945	Chicago Stadium, Chicago, Illinois, US	
102	Win	67–19–11 (5)	Jimmy Gardner	KO	1 (10), 0:46	Oct 11, 1945	Arena, Cleveland, Ohio, US	
101	Win	66–19–11 (5)	Henry Cooper	TKO	3 (10)	Sep 14, 1945	Auditorium, Saint Paul, Minnesota, US	
100	Win	65–19–11 (5)	Larry Lane	UD	10	Jun 1, 1945	Coliseum, Chicago, Illinois, US	
99	Win	64–19–11 (5)	Perk Daniels	KO	8 (10)	May 4, 1945	Coliseum, Baltimore, Maryland, US	
98	Win	63–19–11 (5)	Vince Pimpinella	TKO	5 (10)	Apr 13, 1945	5th Regiment Armory, Baltimore, Maryland, US	
97	Win	62–19–11 (5)	Bob Jacobs	TKO	3 (10)	Apr 3, 1945	Dorsey Park, Miami, Florida, US	
96	Win	61–19–11 (5)	Jimmy O'Brien	TKO	5 (8), 2:41	Mar 23, 1945	Madison Square Garden, New York City, New York, US	
95	Win	60–19–11 (5)	Johnny White	KO	1 (10), 2:19	Feb 5, 1945	St. Nicholas Arena, New York City, New York, US	
94	Win	59–19–11 (5)	Henry Jones	TKO	9 (10), 0:25	Jan 25, 1945	Mechanics Building, Boston, Massachusetts, US	
93	Win	58–19–11 (5)	Mickey Hayes	KO	3 (10), 1:55	Jan 11, 1945	Mechanics Building, Boston, Massachusetts, US	
92	Win	57–19–11 (5)	Kid Riviera	TKO	6 (10)	Dec 8, 1944	Coliseum Arena, New Orleans, Louisiana, US	
91	Win	56–19–11 (5)	Earl Lowman	UD	10	Nov 30, 1944	Mechanics Building, Boston, Massachusetts, US	
90	Win	55–19–11 (5)	Claudio Villar	KO	1 (8), 0:35	Nov 24, 1944	Chicago Stadium, Chicago, Illinois, US	
89	Win	54–19–11 (5)	Bill Petersen	KO	2 (8)	Oct 27, 1944	Chicago Stadium, Chicago, Illinois, US	
88	Win	53–19–11 (5)	Perk Daniels	PTS	10	Oct 17, 1944	Olympic Auditorium, Los Angeles, California, US	
87	Win	52–19–11 (5)	Larry Lovett	TKO	3 (10)	Oct 3, 1944	Olympic Auditorium, Los Angeles, California, US	
86	Win	51–19–11 (5)	Colion Chaney	KO	5 (10)	Jul 17, 1944	Marigold Gardens Outdoor Arena, Chicago, Illinois, US	
85	Win	50–19–11 (5)	Freddie Hudson	KO	1 (10), 2:55	May 15, 1944	Civic Auditorium, San Francisco, California, US	
84	Win	49–19–11 (5)	Bob Smith	KO	2 (10)	May 5, 1944	Legion Stadium, Hollywood, California, US	
83	Win	48–19–11 (5)	Jay D. Turner	KO	5 (10)	Apr 28, 1944	Coliseum, San Diego, California, US	
82	Win	47–19–11 (5)	Buddy Millard	KO	4 (10), 2:20	Mar 31, 1944	Legion Stadium, Hollywood, California, US	
81	Win	46–19–11 (5)	Bob Smith	KO	10 (10)	Mar 15, 1944	Auditorium, Oakland, California, US	
80	Win	45–19–11 (5)	Al Ware	KO	3 (10)	Mar 8, 1944	Gilmore Field, Los Angeles, California, US	
79	Win	44–19–11 (5)	Al Jordan	TKO	3 (10)	Feb 25, 1944	Coliseum, San Diego, California, US	
78	Win	43–19–11 (5)	Mike Alfano	TKO	2 (10)	Feb 18, 1944	Legion Stadium, Hollywood, California, US	
77	Win	42–19–11 (5)	Bob Smith	PTS	10	Dec 3, 1943	Coliseum, San Diego, California, US	
76	Win	41–19–11 (5)	Ernie Rios	TKO	5 (10), 2:40	Nov 12, 1943	Legion Stadium, Hollywood, California, US	
75	Win	40–19–11 (5)	Jimmy Grinnage	TKO	3 (10)	Oct 18, 1943	Ocean Park Arena, Santa Monica, California, US	
74	Win	39–19–11 (5)	Lorenzo Pedro	TKO	8 (10)	Oct 15, 1943	Coliseum, San Diego, California, US	
73	Win	38–19–11 (5)	Gene Felton	KO	2 (10)	Oct 1, 1943	Coliseum, San Diego, California, US	
72	Loss	37–19–11 (5)	Turkey Thompson	KO	1 (10), 2:55	Aug 24, 1943	Olympic Auditorium, Los Angeles, California, US	
71	NC	37–18–11 (5)	Turkey Thompson	NC	6 (10)	Aug 9, 1943	Lane Field, San Diego, California, US	
70	Win	37–18–11 (4)	Phil Johnson	PTS	6	Apr 26, 1943	Arena, Philadelphia, Pennsylvania, US	
69	Win	36–18–11 (4)	George Fitch	PTS	10	Apr 19, 1943	Pelican Stadium, New Orleans, Louisiana, US	
68	Win	35–18–11 (4)	Moise Howard	KO	3 (10)	Jan 24, 1943	Victory Arena, New Orleans, Louisiana, US	
67	Loss	34–18–11 (4)	Larry Lovett	PTS	10	Jan 15, 1943	Legion Arena, West Palm Beach, Florida, US	Billed for the colored heavyweight title of the south
66	Win	34–17–11 (4)	Louis Moulton	KO	3 (10)	Jun 12, 1942	Jacksonville, Florida, US	
65	Win	33–17–11 (4)	Ben Reed	KO	3 (10)	Mar 3, 1942	Dorsey Park, Miami, Florida, US	
64	Win	32–17–11 (4)	Willie Snell	TKO	5 (?)	Feb 20, 1942	Location unknown	Date & location uncertain
63	Win	31–17–11 (4)	Otis Thomas	PTS	10	Feb 17, 1942	Dorsey Park, Miami, Florida, US	
62	Win	30–17–11 (4)	Bob Smith	PTS	10	Feb 10, 1942	Dorsey Park, Miami, Florida, US	
61	Draw	29–17–11 (4)	Dixie Oliver	PTS	8	Jan 26, 1942	Davis Islands Coliseum, Tampa, Florida, US	
60	Win	29–17–10 (4)	Battling Monroe	PTS	10	Oct 29, 1941	City Auditorium, Galveston, Texas, US	
59	Win	28–17–10 (4)	Cyclone Lynch	KO	3 (10), 2:23	Aug 6, 1941	City Auditorium, Galveston, Texas, US	
58	Win	27–17–10 (4)	Wilbert Bassett	TKO	6 (10), 1:35	Jul 23, 1941	City Auditorium, Galveston, Texas, US	
57	Win	26–17–10 (4)	Obie Walker	UD	10	Jun 24, 1941	City Auditorium, Galveston, Texas, US	
56	Win	25–17–10 (4)	Sam Morris	PTS	10	May 12, 1941	American Legion Arena, Orlando, Florida, US	
55	Win	24–17–10 (4)	Willie Reddish	PTS	10	Apr 1, 1941	Dorsey Park, Miami, Florida, US	
54	Draw	23–17–10 (4)	Dixie Oliver	PTS	10	Mar 5, 1941	American Legion Arena, Orlando, Florida, US	
53	Loss	23–17–9 (4)	Willie Reddish	TKO	3 (10)	Feb 27, 1941	Dorsey Park, Miami, Florida, US	
52	Win	23–16–9 (4)	Dixie Oliver	SD	10	Dec 30, 1940	American Legion Arena, Orlando, Florida, US	
51	Win	22–16–9 (4)	Dixie Oliver	KO	2 (10)	Dec 9, 1940	American Legion Arena, Orlando, Florida, US	
50	Win	21–16–9 (4)	Dixie Oliver	PTS	10	Dec 2, 1940	American Legion Arena, Orlando, Florida, US	
49	Win	20–16–9 (4)	Kenny Blackshere	KO	1 (10)	Jul 11, 1940	Jacksonville, Florida, US	
48	Win	19–16–9 (4)	Earl Bethal	KO	1 (10)	Jul 4, 1940	Jacksonville, Florida, US	
47	Win	18–16–9 (4)	Jack Lewis	KO	3 (10)	Apr 29, 1940	American Legion Arena, Orlando, Florida, US	
46	Loss	17–16–9 (4)	Frank Lumpkin	SD	15	Apr 11, 1940	American Legion Arena, Orlando, Florida, US	
45	Win	17–15–9 (4)	Obie Walker	PTS	10	Apr 1, 1940	Tinker Field, Orlando, Florida, US	
44	Win	16–15–9 (4)	Obie Walker	PTS	12	Mar 7, 1940	Dorsey Park, Miami, Florida, US	
43	Loss	15–15–9 (4)	Henry Taylor	SD	10	Feb 16, 1940	Dorsey Park, Miami, Florida, US	
42	Loss	15–14–9 (4)	Frank Lumpkin	PTS	10	Feb 5, 1940	American Legion Arena, Orlando, Florida, US	
41	Loss	15–13–9 (4)	Frank Lumpkin	PTS	10	Jan 22, 1940	American Legion Arena, Orlando, Florida, US	For vacant Southern US (Negro) heavyweight title
40	Win	15–12–9 (4)	Tiger Jack Wright	PTS	10	Jan 11, 1940	City Park Arena, Miami, Florida, US	
39	Win	14–12–9 (4)	Obie Walker	PTS	10	Dec 4, 1939	Township Auditorium, Columbia, South Carolina, US	
38	Win	13–12–9 (4)	Leroy Haynes	UD	10	Jul 17, 1939	Ponce de Leon Ballpark, Atlanta, Georgia, US	
37	Win	12–12–9 (4)	Otto McCall	TKO	3 (?)	Jun 19, 1939	Ponce de Leon Ballpark, Atlanta, Georgia, US	
36	Win	11–12–9 (4)	Obie Walker	NWS	10	Apr 13, 1939	City Auditorium, Birmingham, Alabama, US	
35	Win	11–12–9 (3)	Obie Walker	NWS	10	Feb 23, 1939	City Auditorium, Birmingham, Alabama, US	
34	Loss	11–12–9 (2)	Obie Walker	TKO	6 (10)	Oct 3, 1938	Warren Arena, Atlanta, Georgia, US	
33	Loss	11–11–9 (2)	Obie Walker	PTS	10	Sep 15, 1938	Township Auditorium, Columbia, South Carolina, US	
32	Draw	11–10–9 (2)	Jim Howell	PTS	8	Jul 25, 1938	Dyckman Oval, New York City, New York, US	
31	Loss	11–10–8 (2)	John Henry Lewis	KO	12 (15)	May 19, 1938	Ponce de Leon Ballpark, Atlanta, Georgia, US	
30	Win	11–9–8 (2)	Obie Walker	PTS	10	Apr 27, 1938	City Park Arena, Miami, Florida, US	
29	Win	10–9–8 (2)	Larry Lovett	PTS	10	Apr 1, 1938	Legion Arena, West Palm Beach, Florida, US	Retained 'Colored' Florida State heavyweight title
28	Win	9–9–8 (2)	Larry Lovett	PTS	10	Mar 4, 1938	Legion Arena, West Palm Beach, Florida, US	Won 'Colored' Florida State heavyweight title
27	Loss	8–9–8 (2)	Jersey Joe Walcott	KO	3 (6), 0:43	Sep 25, 1937	Rockland Palace, New York City, New York, US	
26	Win	8–8–8 (2)	Joe St. Peter	KO	1 (4), 1:52	Aug 6, 1937	Long Beach Stadium, Long Beach, Florida, US	
25	Loss	7–8–8 (2)	Earl Bethal	PTS	4	Jul 27, 1937	Jacksonville, Florida, US	
24	NC	7–7–8 (2)	Obie Walker	NC	6 (10)	Apr 20, 1937	N.W. Second Avenue Arena, Miami, Florida, US	The bout was called off when Ray refused to continue after being accidentally hit low
23	Loss	7–7–8 (1)	Obie Walker	TKO	6 (10)	Mar 25, 1937	Lincoln Park Arena, West Palm Beach, Florida, US	
22	Draw	7–6–8 (1)	Obie Walker	PTS	10	Mar 18, 1937	Johnson Street Arena, Daytona Beach, Florida, US	
21	Loss	7–6–7 (1)	Obie Walker	PTS	10	Jan 26, 1937	N.W. Second Avenue Arena, Miami, Florida, US	
20	Draw	7–5–7 (1)	Obie Walker	PTS	10	Jan 19, 1937	N.W. Second Avenue Arena, Miami, Florida, US	
19	Draw	7–5–6 (1)	Ben McCoy	PTS	10	Mar 15, 1936	Nassau, Bahamas	There are missing bouts that he took part in while in the Bahamas
18	Draw	7–5–5 (1)	Billy Jones	PTS	10	Jan 21, 1936	Rockland Ballroom, Miami, Florida, US	
17	Win	7–5–4 (1)	Jonas Cobb	TKO	4 (10)	Jan 14, 1936	Rockland Ballroom, Miami, Florida, US	
16	Loss	6–5–4 (1)	Big Fast Black	KO	2 (6)	Nov 8, 1935	Coliseum Arena, New Orleans, Louisiana, US	
15	Loss	6–4–4 (1)	RC Holloman	DQ	9 (10)	Nov 5, 1935	Recreation Park, Tallahassee, Florida, US	
14	Win	6–3–4 (1)	Ben McCoy	PTS	10	Oct 15, 1935	Recreation Park, Tallahassee, Florida, US	
13	Win	5–3–4 (1)	Henry Johnson	TKO	2 (10)	Oct 8, 1935	Recreation Park, Tallahassee, Florida, US	
12	Loss	4–3–4 (1)	Singapore Joe	PTS	10	Apr 17, 1935	City Park Arena, Miami, Florida, US	
11	Draw	4–2–4 (1)	RC Holloman	PTS	10	Apr 2, 1935	Recreation Park, Tallahassee, Florida, US	
10	Loss	4–2–3 (1)	Willie Bush	DQ	7 (10)	Mar 20, 1935	City Park Arena, Miami, Florida, US	Ray DQ'd for hitting Bush after a knockdown
9	NC	4–1–3 (1)	Willie Bush	NC	2 (10)	Feb 26, 1935	Recreation Park, Tallahassee, Florida, US	
8	Loss	4–1–3	Battling Chauffeur	UD	10	Oct 2, 1934	Recreation Park, Tallahassee, Florida, US	
7	Win	4–0–3	Willie Bush	KO	7 (10)	Sep 18, 1934	Recreation Park, Tallahassee, Florida, US	
6	Win	3–0–3	Willie Bush	TKO	4 (10)	Aug 21, 1934	Recreation Park, Tallahassee, Florida, US	
5	Win	2–0–3	Walter King	UD	10	Jul 17, 1934	Recreation Park, Tallahassee, Florida, US	
4	Draw	1–0–3	Willie Bush	SD	10	Jun 19, 1934	Recreation Park, Tallahassee, Florida, US	
3	Draw	1–0–2	Singapore Joe	PTS	10	Feb 8, 1934	Daytona Beach, Florida, US	
2	Win	1–0–1	Young Jack Johnson	KO	5 (10)	Nov 7, 1933	Recreation Park, Tallahassee, Florida, US	
1	Draw	0–0–1	Walter King	MD	10	Oct 31, 1933	American Legion Arena, Tallahassee, Florida, US	

=== Unofficial record ===
135 fights	98 wins	23 losses
By knockout	69	9
By decision	29	12
By disqualification	0	2
Draws	11	
No contests	3	

Record with the inclusion of newspaper decisions in the win/loss/draw column.

No.	Result	Record	Opponent	Type	Round, time	Date	Location	Notes
135	Loss	98–23–11 (3)	John Holman	KO	8 (10), 1:37	Mar 8, 1949	Dorsey Park, Miami, Florida, US	
134	Loss	98–22–11 (3)	Kid Riviera	UD	10	Feb 22, 1949	Kiel Auditorium, Saint Louis, Missouri, US	
133	Win	98–21–11 (3)	Sid Peaks	KO	9 (10), 2:55	Feb 8, 1949	Dorsey Park, Miami, Florida, US	
132	Win	97–21–11 (3)	Tex Boddie	KO	4 (10)	Jan 11, 1949	Dorsey Park, Miami, Florida, US	
131	Loss	96–21–11 (3)	Ezzard Charles	KO	9 (10), 2:43	May 7, 1948	Chicago Stadium, Chicago, Illinois, US	
130	Win	96–20–11 (3)	Al Smith	TKO	3 (10)	Mar 26, 1948	Dorsey Park, Miami, Florida, US	
129	Win	95–20–11 (3)	Sandy McPherson	KO	5 (10), 2:05	Mar 16, 1948	Dorsey Park, Miami, Florida, US	
128	Win	94–20–11 (3)	Willie Brown	KO	4 (10), 2:18	Mar 2, 1948	Dorsey Park, Miami, Florida, US	
127	Win	93–20–11 (3)	Ezzard Charles	SD	10	Jul 25, 1947	Madison Square Garden, New York City, New York, US	
126	Win	92–20–11 (3)	Howard Chard	TKO	7 (10), 2:55	Jul 14, 1947	MacArthur Stadium, Syracuse, New York, US	
125	Win	91–20–11 (3)	Pete Louthis	KO	2 (10), 2:37	Jul 8, 1947	MacArthur Stadium, Syracuse, New York, US	
124	Win	90–20–11 (3)	Colion Chaney	KO	3 (10), 0:50	Jun 30, 1947	Century Stadium, West Springfield, Massachusetts, US	
123	Loss	89–20–11 (3)	Jersey Joe Walcott	MD	10	Mar 4, 1947	Orange Bowl, Miami, Florida, US	
122	Win	89–19–11 (3)	George Parks	TKO	2 (10)	Feb 6, 1947	Dorsey Park, Miami, Florida, US	
121	Win	88–19–11 (3)	Jersey Joe Walcott	SD	10	Nov 15, 1946	Madison Square Garden, New York City, New York, US	
120	Win	87–19–11 (3)	Clifford Mann	KO	2 (10), 1:12	Nov 4, 1946	Valley Arena, Holyoke, Massachusetts, US	
119	Win	86–19–11 (3)	George Parks	KO	3 (10)	Oct 25, 1946	Rainbo Arena, Chicago, Illinois, US	
118	Win	85–19–11 (3)	Earl Lowman	RTD	2 (10)	Oct 15, 1946	Auditorium, Saint Paul, Minnesota, US	
117	Win	84–19–11 (3)	Lee Savold	KO	2 (10), 1:39	Aug 28, 1946	Ebbets Field, New York City, New York, US	
116	Win	83–19–11 (3)	George Fitch	TKO	5 (10), 1:43	Aug 5, 1946	Century Stadium, West Springfield, Massachusetts, US	
115	Win	82–19–11 (3)	Larry Lane	KO	2 (10), 2:35	Jul 23, 1946	Zivic Arena, Millvale, Pennsylvania, US	
114	Win	81–19–11 (3)	Earl Lowman	KO	3 (10)	Jul 1, 1946	Century Stadium, West Springfield, Massachusetts, US	
113	Win	80–19–11 (3)	Vern Escoe	KO	3 (10)	Jun 17, 1946	Coliseum, Baltimore, Maryland, US	
112	Win	79–19–11 (3)	Art McAlpine	TKO	9 (10), 0:12	Jun 3, 1946	Century Stadium, West Springfield, Massachusetts, US	
111	Win	78–19–11 (3)	Colion Chaney	KO	1 (10), 1:00	Apr 15, 1946	Coliseum, Baltimore, Maryland, US	
110	Win	77–19–11 (3)	Dixie Oliver	KO	1 (10)	Apr 2, 1946	Dorsey Park, Miami, Florida, US	
109	Win	76–19–11 (3)	Hubert Hood	TKO	4 (12)	Mar 19, 1946	Dorsey Park, Miami, Florida, US	
108	Win	75–19–11 (3)	Al Patterson	KO	3 (10)	Mar 5, 1946	Dorsey Park, Miami, Florida, US	
107	Win	74–19–11 (3)	Dan Merritt	KO	4 (10)	Feb 19, 1946	Dorsey Park, Miami, Florida, US	
106	Win	73–19–11 (3)	Grant Shade	KO	1 (10), 1:45	Dec 10, 1945	Bismarck, North Dakota, US	
105	Win	72–19–11 (3)	Cyclone Lynch	KO	1 (10)	Dec 6, 1945	City Auditorium, Galveston, Texas, US	
104	Win	71–19–11 (3)	Grant Shade	KO	2 (10), 1:25	Nov 29, 1945	City Auditorium, Galveston, Texas, US	
103	Win	70–19–11 (3)	Hubert Hood	PTS	10	Oct 19, 1945	Chicago Stadium, Chicago, Illinois, US	
102	Win	69–19–11 (3)	Jimmy Gardner	KO	1 (10), 0:46	Oct 11, 1945	Arena, Cleveland, Ohio, US	
101	Win	68–19–11 (3)	Henry Cooper	TKO	3 (10)	Sep 14, 1945	Auditorium, Saint Paul, Minnesota, US	
100	Win	67–19–11 (3)	Larry Lane	UD	10	Jun 1, 1945	Coliseum, Chicago, Illinois, US	
99	Win	66–19–11 (3)	Perk Daniels	KO	8 (10)	May 4, 1945	Coliseum, Baltimore, Maryland, US	
98	Win	65–19–11 (3)	Vince Pimpinella	TKO	5 (10)	Apr 13, 1945	5th Regiment Armory, Baltimore, Maryland, US	
97	Win	64–19–11 (3)	Bob Jacobs	TKO	3 (10)	Apr 3, 1945	Dorsey Park, Miami, Florida, US	
96	Win	63–19–11 (3)	Jimmy O'Brien	TKO	5 (8), 2:41	Mar 23, 1945	Madison Square Garden, New York City, New York, US	
95	Win	62–19–11 (3)	Johnny White	KO	1 (10), 2:19	Feb 5, 1945	St. Nicholas Arena, New York City, New York, US	
94	Win	61–19–11 (3)	Henry Jones	TKO	9 (10), 0:25	Jan 25, 1945	Mechanics Building, Boston, Massachusetts, US	
93	Win	60–19–11 (3)	Mickey Hayes	KO	3 (10), 1:55	Jan 11, 1945	Mechanics Building, Boston, Massachusetts, US	
92	Win	59–19–11 (3)	Kid Riviera	TKO	6 (10)	Dec 8, 1944	Coliseum Arena, New Orleans, Louisiana, US	
91	Win	58–19–11 (3)	Earl Lowman	UD	10	Nov 30, 1944	Mechanics Building, Boston, Massachusetts, US	
90	Win	57–19–11 (3)	Claudio Villar	KO	1 (8), 0:35	Nov 24, 1944	Chicago Stadium, Chicago, Illinois, US	
89	Win	56–19–11 (3)	Bill Petersen	KO	2 (8)	Oct 27, 1944	Chicago Stadium, Chicago, Illinois, US	
88	Win	55–19–11 (3)	Perk Daniels	PTS	10	Oct 17, 1944	Olympic Auditorium, Los Angeles, California, US	
87	Win	54–19–11 (3)	Larry Lovett	TKO	3 (10)	Oct 3, 1944	Olympic Auditorium, Los Angeles, California, US	
86	Win	53–19–11 (3)	Colion Chaney	KO	5 (10)	Jul 17, 1944	Marigold Gardens Outdoor Arena, Chicago, Illinois, US	
85	Win	52–19–11 (3)	Freddie Hudson	KO	1 (10), 2:55	May 15, 1944	Civic Auditorium, San Francisco, California, US	
84	Win	51–19–11 (3)	Bob Smith	KO	2 (10)	May 5, 1944	Legion Stadium, Hollywood, California, US	
83	Win	50–19–11 (3)	Jay D. Turner	KO	5 (10)	Apr 28, 1944	Coliseum, San Diego, California, US	
82	Win	49–19–11 (3)	Buddy Millard	KO	4 (10), 2:20	Mar 31, 1944	Legion Stadium, Hollywood, California, US	
81	Win	48–19–11 (3)	Bob Smith	KO	10 (10)	Mar 15, 1944	Auditorium, Oakland, California, US	
80	Win	47–19–11 (3)	Al Ware	KO	3 (10)	Mar 8, 1944	Gilmore Field, Los Angeles, California, US	
79	Win	46–19–11 (3)	Al Jordan	TKO	3 (10)	Feb 25, 1944	Coliseum, San Diego, California, US	
78	Win	45–19–11 (3)	Mike Alfano	TKO	2 (10)	Feb 18, 1944	Legion Stadium, Hollywood, California, US	
77	Win	44–19–11 (3)	Bob Smith	PTS	10	Dec 3, 1943	Coliseum, San Diego, California, US	
76	Win	43–19–11 (3)	Ernie Rios	TKO	5 (10), 2:40	Nov 12, 1943	Legion Stadium, Hollywood, California, US	
75	Win	42–19–11 (3)	Jimmy Grinnage	TKO	3 (10)	Oct 18, 1943	Ocean Park Arena, Santa Monica, California, US	
74	Win	41–19–11 (3)	Lorenzo Pedro	TKO	8 (10)	Oct 15, 1943	Coliseum, San Diego, California, US	
73	Win	40–19–11 (3)	Gene Felton	KO	2 (10)	Oct 1, 1943	Coliseum, San Diego, California, US	
72	Loss	39–19–11 (3)	Turkey Thompson	KO	1 (10), 2:55	Aug 24, 1943	Olympic Auditorium, Los Angeles, California, US	
71	NC	39–18–11 (3)	Turkey Thompson	NC	6 (10)	Aug 9, 1943	Lane Field, San Diego, California, US	
70	Win	39–18–11 (2)	Phil Johnson	PTS	6	Apr 26, 1943	Arena, Philadelphia, Pennsylvania, US	
69	Win	38–18–11 (2)	George Fitch	PTS	10	Apr 19, 1943	Pelican Stadium, New Orleans, Louisiana, US	
68	Win	37–18–11 (2)	Moise Howard	KO	3 (10)	Jan 24, 1943	Victory Arena, New Orleans, Louisiana, US	
67	Loss	36–18–11 (2)	Larry Lovett	PTS	10	Jan 15, 1943	Legion Arena, West Palm Beach, Florida, US	Billed for the colored heavyweight title of the south
66	Win	36–17–11 (2)	Louis Moulton	KO	3 (10)	Jun 12, 1942	Jacksonville, Florida, US	
65	Win	35–17–11 (2)	Ben Reed	KO	3 (10)	Mar 3, 1942	Dorsey Park, Miami, Florida, US	
64	Win	34–17–11 (2)	Willie Snell	TKO	5 (?)	Feb 20, 1942	Location unknown	Date & location uncertain
63	Win	33–17–11 (2)	Otis Thomas	PTS	10	Feb 17, 1942	Dorsey Park, Miami, Florida, US	
62	Win	32–17–11 (2)	Bob Smith	PTS	10	Feb 10, 1942	Dorsey Park, Miami, Florida, US	
61	Draw	31–17–11 (2)	Dixie Oliver	PTS	8	Jan 26, 1942	Davis Islands Coliseum, Tampa, Florida, US	
60	Win	31–17–10 (2)	Battling Monroe	PTS	10	Oct 29, 1941	City Auditorium, Galveston, Texas, US	
59	Win	30–17–10 (2)	Cyclone Lynch	KO	3 (10), 2:23	Aug 6, 1941	City Auditorium, Galveston, Texas, US	
58	Win	29–17–10 (2)	Wilbert Bassett	TKO	6 (10), 1:35	Jul 23, 1941	City Auditorium, Galveston, Texas, US	
57	Win	28–17–10 (2)	Obie Walker	UD	10	Jun 24, 1941	City Auditorium, Galveston, Texas, US	
56	Win	27–17–10 (2)	Sam Morris	PTS	10	May 12, 1941	American Legion Arena, Orlando, Florida, US	
55	Win	26–17–10 (2)	Willie Reddish	PTS	10	Apr 1, 1941	Dorsey Park, Miami, Florida, US	
54	Draw	25–17–10 (2)	Dixie Oliver	PTS	10	Mar 5, 1941	American Legion Arena, Orlando, Florida, US	
53	Loss	25–17–9 (2)	Willie Reddish	TKO	3 (10)	Feb 27, 1941	Dorsey Park, Miami, Florida, US	
52	Win	25–16–9 (2)	Dixie Oliver	SD	10	Dec 30, 1940	American Legion Arena, Orlando, Florida, US	
51	Win	24–16–9 (2)	Dixie Oliver	KO	2 (10)	Dec 9, 1940	American Legion Arena, Orlando, Florida, US	
50	Win	23–16–9 (2)	Dixie Oliver	PTS	10	Dec 2, 1940	American Legion Arena, Orlando, Florida, US	
49	Win	22–16–9 (2)	Kenny Blackshere	KO	1 (10)	Jul 11, 1940	Jacksonville, Florida, US	
48	Win	21–16–9 (2)	Earl Bethal	KO	1 (10)	Jul 4, 1940	Jacksonville, Florida, US	
47	Win	20–16–9 (2)	Jack Lewis	KO	3 (10)	Apr 29, 1940	American Legion Arena, Orlando, Florida, US	
46	Loss	19–16–9 (2)	Frank Lumpkin	SD	15	Apr 11, 1940	American Legion Arena, Orlando, Florida, US	
45	Win	19–15–9 (2)	Obie Walker	PTS	10	Apr 1, 1940	Tinker Field, Orlando, Florida, US	
44	Win	18–15–9 (2)	Obie Walker	PTS	12	Mar 7, 1940	Dorsey Park, Miami, Florida, US	
43	Loss	17–15–9 (2)	Henry Taylor	SD	10	Feb 16, 1940	Dorsey Park, Miami, Florida, US	
42	Loss	17–14–9 (2)	Frank Lumpkin	PTS	10	Feb 5, 1940	American Legion Arena, Orlando, Florida, US	
41	Loss	17–13–9 (2)	Frank Lumpkin	PTS	10	Jan 22, 1940	American Legion Arena, Orlando, Florida, US	For vacant Southern US (Negro) heavyweight title
40	Win	17–12–9 (2)	Tiger Jack Wright	PTS	10	Jan 11, 1940	City Park Arena, Miami, Florida, US	
39	Win	16–12–9 (2)	Obie Walker	PTS	10	Dec 4, 1939	Township Auditorium, Columbia, South Carolina, US	
38	Win	15–12–9 (2)	Leroy Haynes	UD	10	Jul 17, 1939	Ponce de Leon Ballpark, Atlanta, Georgia, US	
37	Win	14–12–9 (2)	Otto McCall	TKO	3 (?)	Jun 19, 1939	Ponce de Leon Ballpark, Atlanta, Georgia, US	
36	Win	13–12–9 (2)	Obie Walker	NWS	10	Apr 13, 1939	City Auditorium, Birmingham, Alabama, US	
35	Win	12–12–9 (2)	Obie Walker	NWS	10	Feb 23, 1939	City Auditorium, Birmingham, Alabama, US	
34	Loss	11–12–9 (2)	Obie Walker	TKO	6 (10)	Oct 3, 1938	Warren Arena, Atlanta, Georgia, US	
33	Loss	11–11–9 (2)	Obie Walker	PTS	10	Sep 15, 1938	Township Auditorium, Columbia, South Carolina, US	
32	Draw	11–10–9 (2)	Jim Howell	PTS	8	Jul 25, 1938	Dyckman Oval, New York City, New York, US	
31	Loss	11–10–8 (2)	John Henry Lewis	KO	12 (15)	May 19, 1938	Ponce de Leon Ballpark, Atlanta, Georgia, US	
30	Win	11–9–8 (2)	Obie Walker	PTS	10	Apr 27, 1938	City Park Arena, Miami, Florida, US	
29	Win	10–9–8 (2)	Larry Lovett	PTS	10	Apr 1, 1938	Legion Arena, West Palm Beach, Florida, US	Retained 'Colored' Florida State heavyweight title
28	Win	9–9–8 (2)	Larry Lovett	PTS	10	Mar 4, 1938	Legion Arena, West Palm Beach, Florida, US	Won 'Colored' Florida State heavyweight title
27	Loss	8–9–8 (2)	Jersey Joe Walcott	KO	3 (6), 0:43	Sep 25, 1937	Rockland Palace, New York City, New York, US	
26	Win	8–8–8 (2)	Joe St. Peter	KO	1 (4), 1:52	Aug 6, 1937	Long Beach Stadium, Long Beach, Florida, US	
25	Loss	7–8–8 (2)	Earl Bethal	PTS	4	Jul 27, 1937	Jacksonville, Florida, US	
24	NC	7–7–8 (2)	Obie Walker	NC	6 (10)	Apr 20, 1937	N.W. Second Avenue Arena, Miami, Florida, US	The bout was called off when Ray refused to continue after being accidentally hit low
23	Loss	7–7–8 (1)	Obie Walker	TKO	6 (10)	Mar 25, 1937	Lincoln Park Arena, West Palm Beach, Florida, US	
22	Draw	7–6–8 (1)	Obie Walker	PTS	10	Mar 18, 1937	Johnson Street Arena, Daytona Beach, Florida, US	
21	Loss	7–6–7 (1)	Obie Walker	PTS	10	Jan 26, 1937	N.W. Second Avenue Arena, Miami, Florida, US	
20	Draw	7–5–7 (1)	Obie Walker	PTS	10	Jan 19, 1937	N.W. Second Avenue Arena, Miami, Florida, US	
19	Draw	7–5–6 (1)	Ben McCoy	PTS	10	Mar 15, 1936	Nassau, Bahamas	There are missing bouts that he took part in while in the Bahamas
18	Draw	7–5–5 (1)	Billy Jones	PTS	10	Jan 21, 1936	Rockland Ballroom, Miami, Florida, US	
17	Win	7–5–4 (1)	Jonas Cobb	TKO	4 (10)	Jan 14, 1936	Rockland Ballroom, Miami, Florida, US	
16	Loss	6–5–4 (1)	Big Fast Black	KO	2 (6)	Nov 8, 1935	Coliseum Arena, New Orleans, Louisiana, US	
15	Loss	6–4–4 (1)	RC Holloman	DQ	9 (10)	Nov 5, 1935	Recreation Park, Tallahassee, Florida, US	
14	Win	6–3–4 (1)	Ben McCoy	PTS	10	Oct 15, 1935	Recreation Park, Tallahassee, Florida, US	
13	Win	5–3–4 (1)	Henry Johnson	TKO	2 (10)	Oct 8, 1935	Recreation Park, Tallahassee, Florida, US	
12	Loss	4–3–4 (1)	Singapore Joe	PTS	10	Apr 17, 1935	City Park Arena, Miami, Florida, US	
11	Draw	4–2–4 (1)	RC Holloman	PTS	10	Apr 2, 1935	Recreation Park, Tallahassee, Florida, US	
10	Loss	4–2–3 (1)	Willie Bush	DQ	7 (10)	Mar 20, 1935	City Park Arena, Miami, Florida, US	Ray DQ'd for hitting Bush after a knockdown
9	NC	4–1–3 (1)	Willie Bush	NC	2 (10)	Feb 26, 1935	Recreation Park, Tallahassee, Florida, US	
8	Loss	4–1–3	Battling Chauffeur	UD	10	Oct 2, 1934	Recreation Park, Tallahassee, Florida, US	
7	Win	4–0–3	Willie Bush	KO	7 (10)	Sep 18, 1934	Recreation Park, Tallahassee, Florida, US	
6	Win	3–0–3	Willie Bush	TKO	4 (10)	Aug 21, 1934	Recreation Park, Tallahassee, Florida, US	
5	Win	2–0–3	Walter King	UD	10	Jul 17, 1934	Recreation Park, Tallahassee, Florida, US	
4	Draw	1–0–3	Willie Bush	SD	10	Jun 19, 1934	Recreation Park, Tallahassee, Florida, US	
3	Draw	1–0–2	Singapore Joe	PTS	10	Feb 8, 1934	Daytona Beach, Florida, US	
2	Win	1–0–1	Young Jack Johnson	KO	5 (10)	Nov 7, 1933	Recreation Park, Tallahassee, Florida, US	
1	Draw	0–0–1	Walter King	MD	10	Oct 31, 1933	American Legion Arena, Tallahassee, Florida, US	

== See also ==
- Murderers' Row (Boxing)
