= Ewart Potgieter (boxer) =

South African boxer (1932-1998)

Personal information
- Nickname: The Vryheid Giant
- Born: Ewart Frederick Potgieter; December 28, 1932 Vryheid, Natal, South Africa
- Died: April 1, 1997 (aged 64) Vryheid, KwaZulu-Natal, South Africa
- Occupation: Boxer
- Height: 7 ft 2 in (218 cm)
- Weight: Heavyweight

Boxing career
- Reach: 94 in (239 cm)

Boxing record
- Total fights: 14
- Wins: 11
- Win by KO: 11
- Losses: 2

Ewart Potgieter (December 28, 1932 – April 1, 1997) was a South African professional boxer who was one of the largest in the history of boxing.

== Early life and education ==
Ewart Frederick Potgieter was born in Vryheid, Natal, South Africa, on December 28, 1932.

While at Vryheid High School, he was active in boxing. After a year of pre-medical studies at the University of Natal, Potgieter left school following his brother's accidental death and returned to work on his father's cattle ranch.

By his early twenties, he had grown to 7 ft 2 in, compared with his father's 6 ft 4 in and mother's 5 ft 7 in. Seeing potential in Potgieter's future in boxing, a Vryheid hotel owner arranged for him to be trained by Tommy Holt, a former bantamweight champion of South Africa.

== Professional career ==
Skipping the amateurs, Potgieter entered the pro ranks and stopped Fred McCoy in his first fight at Durban. He went on a seven-fight winning streak in South Africa before British promoter Jack Solomons brought him to England in September 1955. He came under the guidance of Nat Sellars in Cardiff. He added two more wins in England before a draw against Canada's James J. Parker, who substituted Earl Walls, at the Harringay Arena in November 1955.

Potgieter limited his 1956 activity to exhibition bouts in South Africa's four provinces before traveling to Boston in December with manager Johann Eloff on a six-month visa. The Massachusetts Boxing Commission refused him a license because a pituitary tumor impaired his vision, but he underwent surgery and was cleared to box.

His first American bout came in January 1957 at Valley Arena Gardens, where he was defeated by Jeff Dyer of Springfield. The 7-foot-2-inch South African boxer, who received early comparisons to Primo Carnera, soon came under the co-management of Sid Flaherty, manager of Eddie Machen. Starting out under Flaherty, he defeated Dave Roy in February and Bruce Olson in March 1957. Potgieter's knockout of Olson led to Olson undergoing emergency surgery for a brain hemorrhage that ended his fighting career.

Potgieter's last fight was in April 1957 against John Holman, who had defeated Ezzard Charles in 1955. He lost by unanimous decision.

== Professional boxing record ==
14 fights	11 wins	2 losses
By knockout	11	0
By decision	0	2
Draws	1	

== Death ==
Ewart Potgieter died on April 1, 1997, in Vryheid, KwaZulu-Natal, South Africa.

== Legacy ==
According to the Guinness World Records, he weighed in as the heaviest boxer ever at 326 lbs.
