= Earl Walls =

Canadian boxer (1928-1996)

Personal information
- Nickname: The Hooded Terror
- Nationality: (Canada) Canadian
- Born: Earl Walls; February 19, 1928 Puce, Ontario, Canada
- Died: December 13, 1996 (aged 68) Toronto, Ontario, Canada
- Occupation: Boxer
- Height: 6 ft 2½ in (189cm)

Boxing career
- Reach: 78 in (198cm)
- Stance: Orthodox

Boxing record
- Total fights: 44
- Wins: 34
- Win by KO: 27
- Losses: 9
- Draws: 1

Earl Walls (February 19, 1928 – December 13, 1996) was a Canadian professional heavyweight boxer who competed from 1948 to 1955. He won the Canadian heavyweight championship in 1952 and was inducted into the Canadian Boxing Hall of Fame in 1978.

== Early life ==
Earl Walls, an African-Canadian, was born on February 19, 1928, in Puce, Ontario.

Alongside nine brothers and sisters, he was raised on the family farm in Essex County, Ontario. His great-grandfather had fled slavery in North Carolina, reaching Canada through the Underground Railroad.

Growing up in Essex County, Walls made the 3½-mile walk to a one-room schoolhouse with 45 students. Athletics were limited to hockey and baseball.

While attending a boxing match at the Detroit Olympia, Walls stepped in to replace an absent fighter, only to be blown out in a bout refereed by Joe Louis. Walls soon started boxing training at Patsy Drouillard's gym in Windsor, Ontario, where he was guided by Bill Swinhoe. At 18, he traveled to Toronto, but a misdiagnosed medical exam blocked him from working as a railway porter, leading him to a stint as a Detroit nightclub bouncer.

== Amateur boxing career ==
Earl Walls began boxing competitively at age 19. Back in Toronto, family friend Shirley S. Jackson connected Walls with Jimmy Jones, under whom he sparred with then heavyweight prospect Vern Escoe. Jones arranged four amateur bouts for Walls in Toronto. He quickly won the Ontario Amateur Heavyweight Championship in 1947. Jones brought him to New York City, where he trained at Stillman's Gym for four months before turning professional, sparring with 31 main-event heavyweights.

== Professional career ==
His first professional bout came on May 5, 1948, in New York City, where he stopped Dick Lee in the opening round. After three defeats, he shifted his training to Alberta.

From August 1949 to January 1950, he had six bouts in England, finishing with a 4-2 record. After back-to-back victories in Canada in June 1950, he traveled to New York, where he fell to Abel Cestac at St. Nicholas Arena and Jimmy Slade at Madison Square Garden.

=== Taking the Canadian heavyweight championship, June 1952 ===
He captured the Canadian heavyweight championship in Edmonton on June 14, 1952, with a knockout win over then-Canadian heavyweight champion Vern Escoe.

==== Notable bouts during heavyweight title reign ====
He held onto his heavyweight title in a rematch with Escoe at Clarke Stadium the next month.

Before 10,000 fans in Edmonton, Walls battled Rex Layne of the U.S. on June 3, 1953, in a non-title bout. He scored a knockout over Layne, an eighth-ranking prospect, in 1:10 of the first round. The contract called for a rematch in Salt Lake City within thirty days. Walls once again stopped Layne by knockout in round six of their rematch on September 8, 1953. Walls had begun training under Dan Florio starting with the Layne bouts.

He retained his Canadian heavyweight boxing title against James J. Parker in front of 6,500 fans at the Maple Leaf Gardens. The twelve-round battle was ruled as a controversial draw.

In 1955, on track to be the second Canadian after Tommy Burns to claim the world heavyweight title, he was ranked fifth in the world and seemed destined to face Rocky Marciano. He had accepted a $10,000 offer to fight South Africa's 7 ft 2, 300-pound Ewart Potgieter in London but later pulled out during the same week of his scheduled flight. At 27, Walls made his retirement from boxing official on November 2, 1955.

During his pro career, Walls knocked out 27 opponents, including 14 in the first round.

== Professional boxing record ==
44 fights	34 wins	9 losses
By knockout	27	3
By decision	7	6
Draws	1	

== Life after boxing ==
By 1961, he had established himself as a successful real estate broker in North Toronto.

== Death ==
Earl Walls died on December 13, 1996, in Toronto, Ontario, Canada.

== Awards and recognition ==
- 1978 Canadian Boxing Hall of Fame inductee
- Afro-American Sports Hall of Fame inductee
- 1992 Windsor/Essex County Sports Hall of Fame inductee
- 2001 Etobicoke Sports Hall of Fame inductee

Achievements
Preceded by Vern Escoe	Canadian Heavyweight Champion; June 13, 1952 – November 2, 1955	Succeeded by George Chuvalo
