= Vern Escoe =

Canadian boxer (1930–2002)

Personal information
- Nationality: (Canada) Canadian
- Born: Vern Escoe; December 27, 1921 Toronto, Ontario, Canada
- Died: September 19, 2002 (aged 80) Toronto, Ontario, Canada
- Occupation: Boxer
- Height: 5 ft 11½ in
- Weight: Heavyweight

Boxing career
- Stance: Orthodox

Boxing record
- Total fights: 48
- Wins: 30
- Win by KO: 12
- Losses: 18

Vern Escoe (December 27, 1921 – September 19, 2002) was a Canadian professional heavyweight boxer who won the Canadian heavyweight championship in 1947.

== Early life ==
Escoe was born on December 27, 1921, in Toronto, Ontario, Canada.

== Amateur boxing career ==
Escoe learned to box in 1930s Toronto as protection against racism. He won the provincial heavyweight title while working in a steel foundry.

== Professional career ==
In 1943, after going professional, Escoe launched his career by knocking out his first four opponents.

After joining the Canadian Army as a private, he participated in the army boxing championships in May 1944. Representing military district no. 2, he secured the heavyweight championship of the Canadian army in the open class.

He followed his win over Al Hoosman with a tough fight against future champion Archie Moore in May 1946, ultimately losing by TKO. Following losses to 49-9-2 Lee Q. Murray and Elmer Ray, then 84-19-12, in Baltimore, he returned to Canada.

=== Taking the Canadian heavyweight championship, February 1947 ===
Escoe won the Canadian heavyweight championship with a tenth-round knockout of Arnold Hayes on February 10, 1947.

==== Notable bouts during heavyweight title reign ====
Promoter Jack Solomons invited Escoe and Jimmy Jones to London for a bout with undefeated British heavyweight Jack Gardner. At Olympia Arena in July 1949, Escoe defeated Gardner in the fifth round. After victories over Jack London and Georges Rogiers, he again defeated Gardner but lost to Johnny Williams.

Escoe defended his Canadian heavyweight crown in 1952, knocking out Doug Harper of Vancouver in the sixth round at 2:55.

==== Losing the Canadian heavyweight championship, July 1952 ====
He faced his stablemate Earl Walls in Edmonton on June 14, 1952, and the Canadian heavyweight champion Escoe was knocked out. He was unable to regain his title in a 12-round rematch with Walls at Clarke Stadium in July 1952.

Escoe suffered a third-round KO to former American world heavyweight champion Ezzard Charles in April 1955.

In 1957, he was Canada's third-ranked heavyweight after J. J. Parker and George Chuvalo. He returned in 1958 to face Irish Pat McMurtry in his final bout at the Butte Civic Center.

Escoe boxed professionally from 1943 until 1958, earning the British Empire title during his career.

== Professional boxing record ==
48 fights	30 wins	18 losses
By knockout	12	9
By decision	18	9

== Death ==
Escoe died on September 19, 2002, in Toronto, Ontario, Canada, at 78.

== Awards and recognition ==
- 1978 Canadian Boxing Hall of Fame inductee

Achievements
Preceded by Al Delaney	Canadian Heavyweight Champion; February 10, 1947 – June 13, 1952	Succeeded by Earl Walls
