= Henry Taylor (boxer) =

American boxer

Henry Taylor (born 1914, date of death unknown) was an American professional boxer. He was born in Philadelphia, Pennsylvania. Taylor's career spanned from 1932 to 1946. During this time, he had 18 professional bouts, winning 9 (3 by knockout) with 7 losses and 2 draws. He has the distinction of having defeated former heavyweight world champion Jersey Joe Walcott. The pair had two bouts: Walcott won the first, a TKO in the first round and Taylor won their second meeting, just over 3 months later, by a 6-round points decision.
