= Young Corbett III =

American boxer

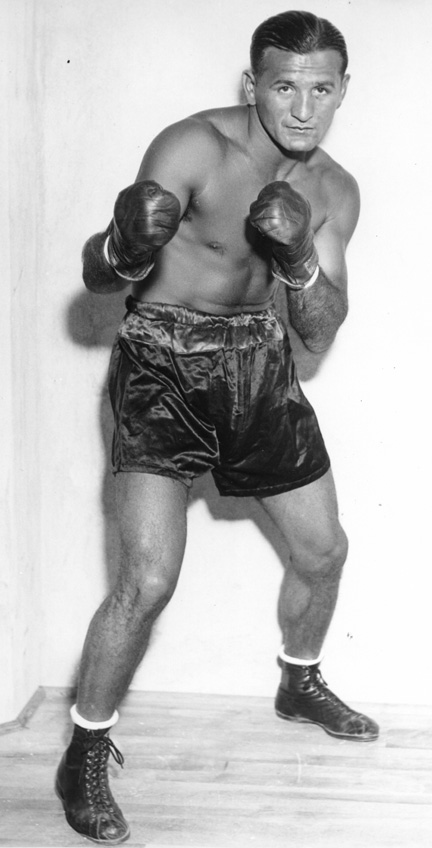

Personal information
- Nickname: "Young Corbett III"
- Nationality: American
- Born: Ralph Giordano; May 27, 1905 Rionero in Vulture, Basilicata, Italy
- Died: July 15, 1993 (aged 88) Auberry, California, U.S.
- Height: 5 ft 7 1/2 in (171 cm)
- Weight: Welterweight; Middleweight

Boxing career
- Reach: 67 in (170 cm)
- Stance: Southpaw

Boxing record
- Total fights: 155
- Wins: 123
- Win by KO: 33
- Losses: 12
- Draws: 20

Ralph Giordano (born Raffaele Giordano, May 27, 1905 – July 15, 1993), better known as Young Corbett III, was an Italian-born American boxer. He was the Undisputed World Welterweight Champion in 1933 and challenged for the NYSAC Middleweight championship in 1938. A tough southpaw, he did not have strong punching power but was known for his great speed and determination. Corbett is considered one of the greatest southpaws of all time and one of the all-time great counterpunchers. He was inducted into the Fresno County Athletic Hall of Fame in 1959, the Italian American Sports Hall of Fame in 1982, and the International Boxing Hall of Fame in 2004.

== Biography ==
=== Early life ===
Born in Rionero in Vulture, in the Italian region of Basilicata, from Vito Giordano and Gelsomina Capobianco, he moved with his family to the United States when he was still an infant and was erroneously registered as Raffaele Capabianca Giordano. After four years of living in Pittsburgh, Pennsylvania, he moved to Fresno, California, and began boxing in 1919 while still a 14-year-old "newsboy." One day Corbett and a friend hopped a freight train headed for Sacramento in search for a match there but they arrived in Marysville by mistake, where they attended a boxing show that night. After convincing the promoter that he was a fighter, Corbett faced a more experienced boxer named Eddie Morris, who knocked him out in the third round. Corbett, however, earned $7.50 for his performance.

After graduating from Edison High School in 1920, Corbett began to practice more seriously. He got his stage name when a ring announcer told him he would not present him as Ralph Giordano and dubbed him "Young Corbett III" because his fighting style reminded him of William J. Rothwell, known as Young Corbett II, or, according to other sources, for his haircut similar to that of heavyweight champion James J. Corbett.

=== Boxing career ===
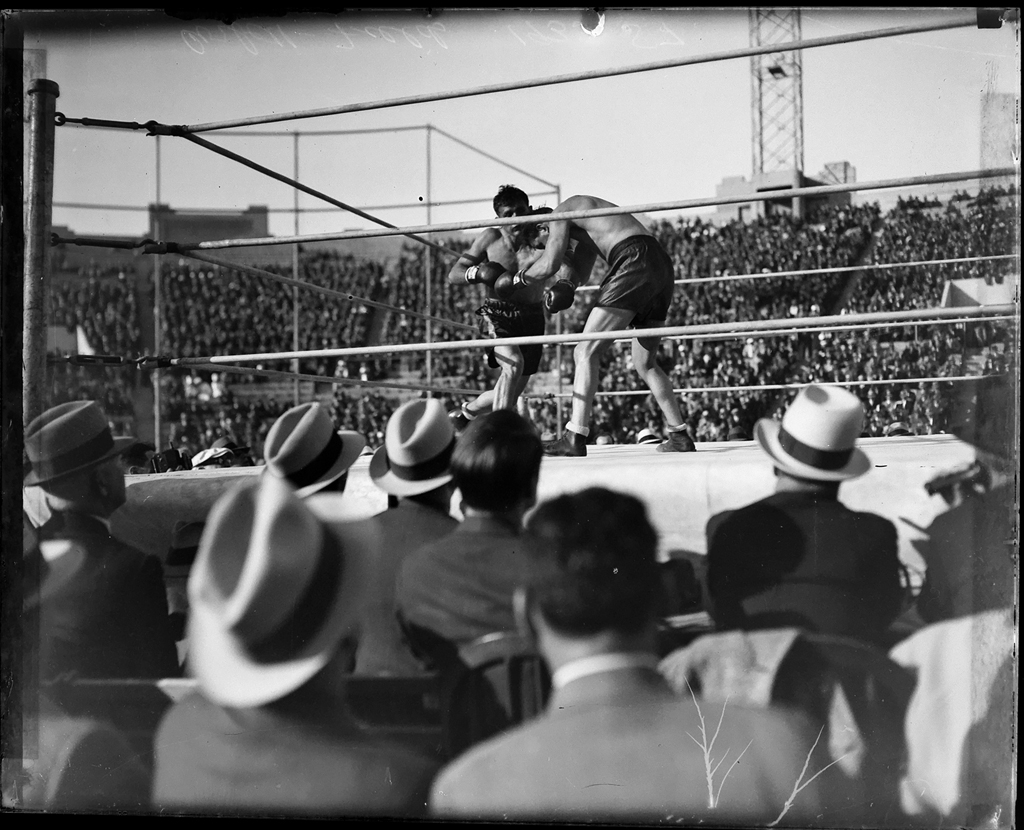
Corbett (facing camera) battles Jackie Fields at San Francisco's Seals Stadium,1933

Corbett fought many great fighters of his era, suffering only 5 defeats in his first 75 recorded bouts. He engaged in a four-fight series with future welterweight champion Young Jack Thompson, winning three and drawing once. He also scored wins over Jack Zivic, Sgt. Sammy Baker, welterweight champion Jackie Fields and future middleweight king Ceferino Garcia.

Before a crowd of 16,000 on February 22, 1933, Corbett captured the welterweight championship of the world by decisioning, from Jackie Fields in over 10 rounds at San Francisco's Seals Stadium. He competed with a broken hand received from a sparring session three days before the fight, and hurt his left thumb in the fifth round but continued to fight undaunted. Referee Jack Kennedy remembered Corbett as "vicious in those first five rounds. He ripped him like a tiger. Fields could not protect himself".

Three months later, he was dethroned by Hall of Famer Jimmy McLarnin in a first round knockout. Corbett then moved up to the middleweight division. He scored wins over future light heavy champ Gus Lesnevich (TKO 5), as well as Hall of Famers Mickey Walker, and Billy Conn. On February 22, 1938 he beat Fred Apostoli, winning the middleweight championship. On November 18 of that year, he challenged Apostoli again, but was stopped in 8 rounds.

=== Retirement and death ===
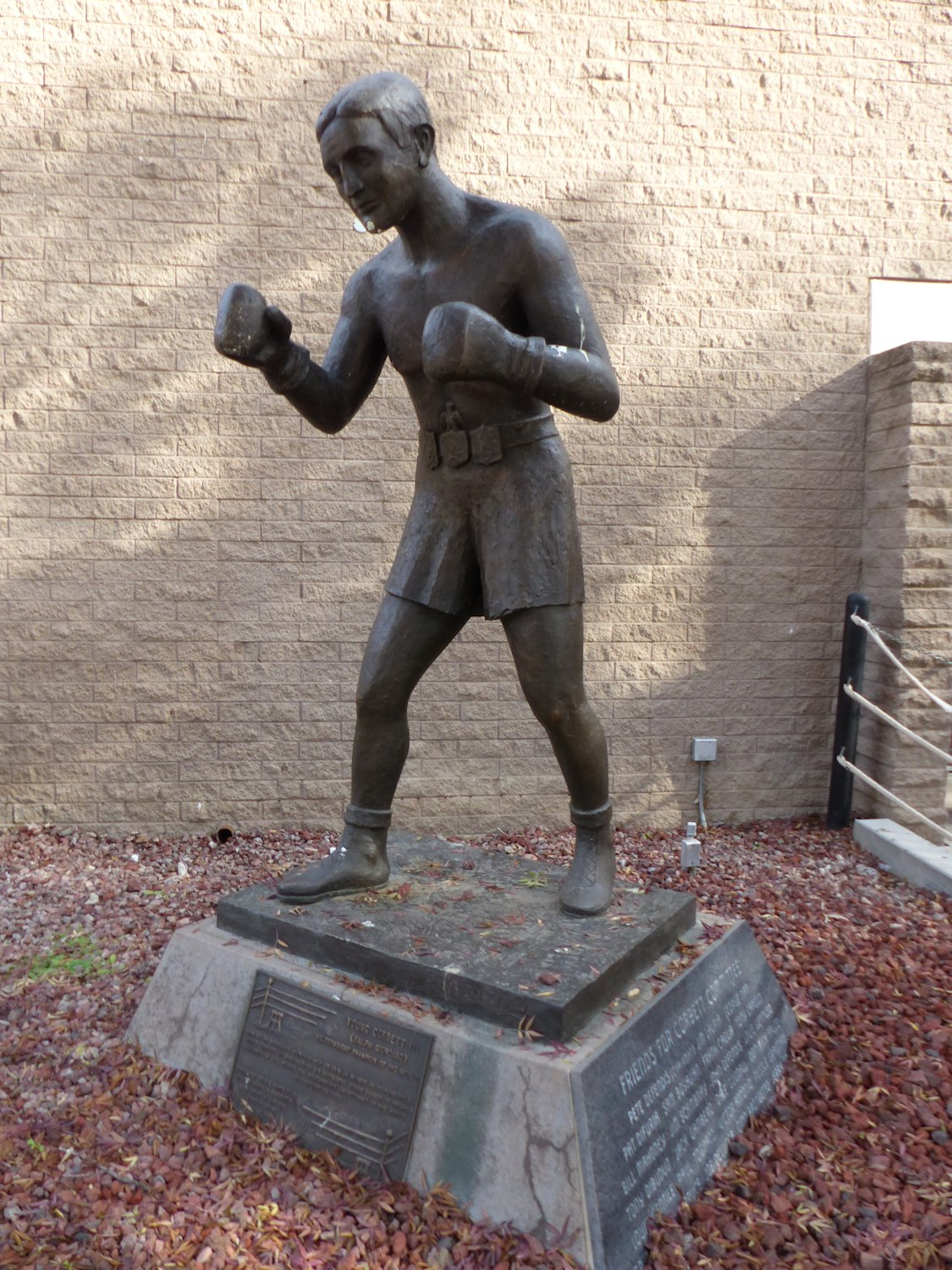
Monument of Young Corbett III in Fresno, California

Corbett boxed until August 20, 1940, winning his last fight against Richard "Sheik" Rangel. He retired with a 123-12-20 (33 KOs) record. He later operated a bar in Fresno. On October 2, 1945 Corbett survived a serious car accident on Highway 99 near Delano, suffering a fractured skull and other injuries. He died in Auberry, California at the age of 88, after about 20 years afflicted with Alzheimer's disease. A statue of him, posed in a fighting stance and boxing gloves, was erected in Fresno. The sculpture was realized by Clement Renzi.

== Personal life ==
Corbett was married to Gladys Padgett (1909-1994). Besides his boxing career, he was a physical education instructor for the California Highway Patrol and a grape grower. His cousin Al Manfredo (1912-1990) also was a boxer and later a boxing manager. Corbett is the great-grandfather of former American football safety Matt Giordano.

== Professional boxing record ==
155 fights	123 wins	12 losses
By knockout	32	4
By decision	89	8
By disqualification	2	0
Draws	20	

No.	Result	Record	Opponent	Type	Round	Date	Location	Notes
155	Win	123–12–20	Sheik Rangel	PTS	10	Aug 20, 1940	Italian Entertainment Park, Fresno, California, U.S.	
154	Win	122–12–20	Harry Cahill	PTS	10	Apr 15, 1940	Coliseum Bowl, San Francisco, California, U.S.	
153	Win	121–12–20	Dale Sparr	PTS	10	Mar 13, 1940	Auditorium, Oakland, California, U.S.	
152	Win	120–12–20	Dick Foster	TKO	7 (10)	Dec 14, 1939	Civic Auditorium, San Francisco, California, U.S.	
151	Loss	119–12–20	Fred Apostoli	TKO	8 (15)	Nov 18, 1938	Madison Square Garden, New York City, New York, U.S.	For vacant NYSAC middleweight title
150	Win	119–11–20	Glen Lee	PTS	10	Jul 19, 1938	Ratcliffe Stadium, Fresno, California, U.S.	
149	Win	118–11–20	Jackie Burke	PTS	10	May 25, 1938	McCullough's Arena, Salt Lake City, Utah, U.S.	
148	Win	117–11–20	Fred Apostoli	PTS	10	Feb 22, 1938	Seals Stadium, San Francisco, California, U.S.	
147	Win	116–11–20	Dick Foster	PTS	10	Dec 17, 1937	Dreamland Auditorium, San Francisco, California, U.S.	
146	Loss	115–11–20	Billy Conn	UD	10	Nov 8, 1937	Duquesne Garden, Pittsburgh, Pennsylvania, U.S.	
145	Win	115–10–20	Billy Conn	PTS	10	Aug 13, 1937	Auditorium, Oakland, California, U.S.	
144	Win	114–10–20	Joe Smallwood	PTS	10	Jul 21, 1937	Auditorium, Oakland, California, U.S.	
143	Win	113–10–20	Dale Sparr	PTS	10	Apr 2, 1937	Dreamland Auditorium, San Francisco, California, U.S.	
142	Win	112–10–20	Gus Lesnevich	TKO	5 (10)	Mar 12, 1937	Dreamland Auditorium, San Francisco, California, U.S.	
141	Win	111–10–20	Joe Bernall	PTS	10	Sep 18, 1936	Frank Chance Field, Fresno, California, U.S.	
140	Win	110–10–20	Mike Bazzonne	PTS	10	Jul 31, 1936	Dreamland Auditorium, San Francisco, California, U.S.	
139	Win	109–10–20	Frankie Britt	KO	7 (10)	Jul 10, 1936	Dreamland Auditorium, San Francisco, California, U.S.	
138	Loss	108–10–20	Lou Brouillard	PTS	10	Jul 4, 1935	Kezar Stadium, San Francisco, California, U.S.	
137	Win	108–9–20	Bep van Klaveren	PTS	10	Feb 22, 1935	Kezar Stadium, San Francisco, California, U.S.	
136	Win	107–9–20	Bep van Klaveren	PTS	10	Jan 28, 1935	Civic Auditorium, San Francisco, California, U.S.	
135	Win	106–9–20	Mickey Walker	PTS	10	Aug 14, 1934	Seals Stadium, San Francisco, California, U.S.	
134	Win	105–9–20	Young Terry	KO	3 (10)	Apr 13, 1934	Civic Auditorium, San Francisco, California, U.S.	
133	Win	104–9–20	Babe Marino	PTS	10	Feb 5, 1934	Civic Auditorium, San Francisco, California, U.S.	
132	Loss	103–9–20	Jimmy McLarnin	TKO	1 (10)	May 29, 1933	Wrigley Field, Los Angeles, California, U.S.	Lost NYSAC, NBA, and The Ring welterweight titles
131	Win	103–8–20	Jackie Fields	PTS	10	Feb 22, 1933	Seals Stadium, San Francisco, California, U.S.	Won NYSAC, NBA, and The Ring welterweight titles
130	Win	102–8–20	Joe Glick	PTS	10	Dec 19, 1932	Exposition Auditorium, San Francisco, California, U.S.	
129	Win	101–8–20	Ceferino Garcia	TKO	9 (10)	Oct 25, 1932	Civic Auditorium, Fresno, California, U.S.	
128	Win	100–8–20	Babe Anderson	TKO	9 (10)	Aug 19, 1932	Stockton, California, U.S.	
127	Win	99–8–20	Vearl Whitehead	PTS	10	May 16, 1932	Civic Auditorium, San Francisco, California, U.S.	
126	Win	98–8–20	David Velaco	PTS	10	Apr 21, 1932	Memorial Auditorium, Sacramento, California, U.S.	
125	Win	97–8–20	Ceferino Garcia	PTS	10	Apr 12, 1932	Olympic Auditorium, Los Angeles, California, U.S.	
124	Win	96–8–20	David Velasco	PTS	10	Mar 4, 1932	Dreamland Auditorium, San Francisco, California, U.S.	
123	Win	95–8–20	Gaston LeCadre	PTS	10	Aug 14, 1931	Dreamland Auditorium, San Francisco, California, U.S.	
122	Win	94–8–20	Meyer Grace	PTS	10	Jun 18, 1931	Legion Stadium, Hollywood, California, U.S.	
121	Win	93–8–20	Tommy Herman	PTS	10	May 1, 1931	Dreamland Auditorium, San Francisco, California, U.S.	
120	Win	92–8–20	Paul Pirrone	PTS	10	Mar 20, 1931	Dreamland Auditorium, San Francisco, California, U.S.	
119	Win	91–8–20	Paulie Walker	PTS	10	Feb 20, 1931	Dreamland Auditorium, San Francisco, California, U.S.	
118	Draw	90–8–20	Paulie Walker	PTS	10	Jan 13, 1931	Olympic Auditorium, Los Angeles, California, U.S.	
117	Win	90–8–19	Farmer Joe Cooper	KO	1 (10)	Nov 5, 1930	Auditorium, Oakland, California, U.S.	
116	Win	89–8–19	Sammy Jackson	PTS	10	Sep 30, 1930	Olympic Auditorium, Los Angeles, California, U.S.	
115	Win	88–8–19	Jack Thompson	PTS	10	Jul 4, 1930	Ewing Field, San Francisco, California, U.S.	
114	Win	87–8–19	Andy DiVodi	KO	6 (10)	May 16, 1930	Dreamland Auditorium, San Francisco, California, U.S.	
113	Win	86–8–19	Alf Ross	PTS	10	Apr 25, 1930	Dreamland Auditorium, San Francisco, California, U.S.	
112	Win	85–8–19	Jackie Fields	PTS	10	Feb 22, 1930	Recreation Park, San Francisco, California, U.S.	
111	Win	84–8–19	Babe Anderson	PTS	10	Jan 1, 1930	Forman's Arena, San Jose, California, U.S.	
110	Win	83–8–19	Tommy Elks	PTS	10	Dec 13, 1929	Dreamland Auditorium, San Francisco, California, U.S.	
109	Win	82–8–19	Bucky Lawless	KO	1 (10)	Aug 30, 1929	Dreamland Auditorium, San Francisco, California, U.S.	
108	Win	81–8–19	Clyde Chastain	PTS	10	Jun 21, 1929	Dreamland Auditorium, San Francisco, California, U.S.	
107	Win	80–8–19	Al Van Ryan	PTS	10	Jun 7, 1929	Dreamland Auditorium, San Francisco, California, U.S.	
106	Win	79–8–19	Pete Meyers	PTS	10	Apr 22, 1929	State Armory, San Francisco, California, U.S.	
105	Win	78–8–19	Fred Mahan	PTS	10	Mar 15, 1929	State Armory, San Francisco, California, U.S.	
104	Win	77–8–19	Al Gracio	TKO	8 (10)	Feb 11, 1929	State Armory, San Francisco, California, U.S.	
103	Draw	76–8–19	Pete Meyers	PTS	10	Jan 11, 1929	Ebbets Field, Brooklyn, New York City, New York, U.S.	
102	Loss	76–8–18	Sergent Sammy Baker	PTS	12	Sep 26, 1928	Ebbets Field, Brooklyn, New York City, New York, U.S.	
101	Win	76–7–18	Sergent Sammy Baker	PTS	12	Sep 13, 1928	Madison Square Garden, New York City, New York, U.S.	
100	Win	75–7–18	Nick Testo	KO	5 (10)	Aug 17, 1928	Dreamland Auditorium, San Francisco, California, U.S.	
99	Win	74–7–18	Jack Zivic	PTS	10	Jun 18, 1928	State Armory, San Francisco, California, U.S.	
98	Win	73–7–18	Tony Azevedo	PTS	10	Apr 20, 1928	Ballpark, Hanford, California, U.S.	
97	Win	72–7–18	Eddie Roberts	KO	9 (10)	Mar 12, 1928	State Armory, San Francisco, California, U.S.	
96	Win	71–7–18	Jack Thompson	PTS	10	Feb 13, 1928	State Armory, San Francisco, California, U.S.	
95	Win	70–7–18	Young Sam Langford	PTS	10	Dec 21, 1927	National Hall, San Francisco, California, U.S.	
94	Win	69–7–18	Gilberto Attell	KO	5 (10)	Dec 14, 1927	National Hall, San Francisco, California, U.S.	
93	Win	68–7–18	Sailor Ashmore	KO	5 (10)	Nov 22, 1927	Civic Auditorium, Fresno, California, U.S.	
92	Win	67–7–18	Dave Cook	KO	2 (10)	Nov 1, 1927	Civic Auditorium, Fresno, California, U.S.	
91	Win	66–7–18	Charlie Feraci	PTS	10	Oct 21, 1927	Coliseum, San Diego, California, U.S.	
90	Win	65–7–18	Joe Vargas	PTS	10	Sep 20, 1927	Civic Auditorium, Fresno, California, U.S.	
89	Win	64–7–18	Freddie Mack	PTS	10	Aug 5, 1927	Dreamland Rink, San Francisco, California, U.S.	
88	Draw	63–7–18	Tommy White	PTS	10	Jul 29, 1927	Dreamland Rink, San Francisco, California, U.S.	
87	Draw	63–7–17	Jack Thompson	PTS	10	Jun 24, 1927	Dreamland Rink, San Francisco, California, U.S.	
86	Win	63–7–16	Jack Silver	PTS	10	Jun 7, 1927	Fresno, California, U.S.	
85	Win	62–7–16	Frankie Tierney	PTS	10	May 25, 1927	Auditorium, Oakland, California, U.S.	
84	Win	61–7–16	Young Harry Willis	DQ	10 (10)	Apr 13, 1927	Auditorium, Oakland, California, U.S.	
83	Draw	60–7–16	Billy Murphy	PTS	10	Mar 23, 1927	Auditorium, Oakland, California, U.S.	
82	Win	60–7–15	Larry Murphy	PTS	10	Mar 1, 1927	Civic Auditorium, Fresno, California, U.S.	
81	Win	59–7–15	Phil Salvadore	TKO	4 (10)	Jan 18, 1927	Civic Auditorium, Fresno, California, U.S.	
80	Win	58–7–15	Dick Hoppe	PTS	10	Dec 3, 1926	Legion Stadium, Hollywood, California, U.S.	
79	Win	57–7–15	Jack Sparr	TKO	3 (10)	Nov 3, 1926	Civic Auditorium, Fresno, California, U.S.	
78	Win	56–7–15	Joe Chaney	PTS	6	Oct 12, 1926	Tulare, California, U.S.	
77	Win	55–7–15	Jerry Young Carpentero	TKO	5 (10)	Oct 5, 1926	Civic Auditorium, Fresno, California, U.S.	
76	Win	54–7–15	Charlie Feraci	PTS	10	Sep 24, 1926	Coliseum, San Diego, California, U.S.	
75	Win	53–7–15	Sailor Ashmore	KO	5 (10)	Sep 10, 1926	Taft, California, U.S.	
74	Win	52–7–15	Joe Layman	PTS	10	Aug 27, 1926	Coliseum, San Diego, California, U.S.	
73	Win	51–7–15	Billy Alger	PTS	10	Aug 6, 1926	Coliseum, San Diego, California, U.S.	
72	Win	50–7–15	Leo Claro	KO	3 (10)	Jul 26, 1926	Taft, California, U.S.	
71	Win	49–7–15	Young Papke	PTS	10	Jul 13, 1926	Civic Auditorium, Fresno, California, U.S.	
70	Draw	48–7–15	Billy Alger	PTS	10	Jul 5, 1926	Pismo Beach, California, U.S.	
69	Win	48–7–14	Jack Sparr	PTS	10	Jun 29, 1926	Civic Auditorium, Fresno, California, U.S.	
68	Win	47–7–14	Joe Schlocker	PTS	10	Jun 15, 1926	Civic Auditorium, Fresno, California, U.S.	
67	Win	46–7–14	Young Burmay	KO	3 (6)	May 25, 1926	Taft, California, U.S.	
66	Win	45–7–14	Young Jack Thompson	PTS	6	May 18, 1926	Civic Auditorium, Fresno, California, U.S.	
65	Win	44–7–14	Danny McCoy	KO	4 (6)	May 10, 1926	Taft, California, U.S.	
64	Win	43–7–14	Freeman Black	TKO	4 (6)	Feb 23, 1926	Civic Auditorium, Fresno, California, U.S.	
63	Draw	42–7–14	Dick Hoppe	PTS	8	Feb 19, 1926	Bakersfield, California, U.S.	
62	Win	42–7–13	John Battling Ward	PTS	10	Jan 25, 1926	Taft Arena, Taft, California, U.S.	
61	Win	41–7–13	Jimmy Carter	KO	5 (6)	Jan 12, 1926	Civic Auditorium, Fresno, California, U.S.	
60	Win	40–7–13	Jack Garcia	TKO	5 (6)	Oct 26, 1925	Taft Arena, Taft, California, U.S.	
59	Win	39–7–13	Joe Powell	PTS	8	Jul 7, 1925	Policemen's Ballpark, Fresno, California, U.S.	
58	Win	38–7–13	Frankie Thomas	PTS	6	Jun 23, 1925	Policemen's Ballpark, Fresno, California, U.S.	
57	Draw	37–7–13	Young Sam Langford	PTS	10	Jun 19, 1925	Kern A.C., Bakersfield, California, U.S.	
56	Win	37–7–12	Billy Rayes	PTS	6	May 22, 1925	Hanford, California, U.S.	
55	Win	36–7–12	Joe Chaney	PTS	6	May 19, 1925	Civic Auditorium, Fresno, California, U.S.	
54	Win	35–7–12	Kid Kopecks	DQ	6 (8)	Apr 27, 1925	Civic Auditorium, Fresno, California, U.S.	
53	Loss	34–7–12	Jack McCarthy	PTS	10	Mar 24, 1925	Civic Auditorium, Fresno, California, U.S.	
52	Win	34–6–12	Gilbert Gallant	KO	2 (10)	Mar 11, 1925	Hanford, California, U.S.	
51	Draw	33–6–12	Julius Jessick	PTS	4	Feb 6, 1925	Civic Auditorium, Fresno, California, U.S.	
50	Win	33–6–11	Indian Mike Doyle	PTS	4	Dec 16, 1924	Civic Auditorium, Fresno, California, U.S.	
49	Draw	32–6–11	Julius Jessick	PTS	4	Nov 18, 1924	Civic Auditorium, Fresno, California, U.S.	
48	Win	32–6–10	Joe Chaney	PTS	4	Nov 11, 1924	Tulare, California, U.S.	
47	Win	31–6–10	Sailor Smith	PTS	4	Oct 30, 1924	Chief Petty Officers Club, San Pedro, California, U.S.	
46	Win	30–6–10	Pete Francis	PTS	4	Sep 25, 1924	Hanford, California, U.S.	
45	Loss	29–6–10	KO Kelly	PTS	4	May 27, 1924	Arena, Vernon, California, U.S.	
44	Loss	29–5–10	Ad Cadena	PTS	4	May 8, 1924	Chief Petty Officers Club, San Pedro, California, U.S.	
43	Draw	29–4–10	Jack Sparr	PTS	4	May 2, 1924	Legion Stadium, Hollywood, California, U.S.	
42	Draw	29–4–9	Eddie Doody	PTS	4	Apr 25, 1924	Dreamland Rink, San Francisco, California, U.S.	
41	Draw	29–4–8	Sam Robideau	PTS	4	Apr 24, 1924	Chief Petty Officers Club, San Pedro, California, U.S.	
40	Win	29–4–7	Battling Teco	PTS	4	Apr 18, 1924	Bakersfield Stadium, Bakersfield, California, U.S.	
39	Win	28–4–7	Benny Berris	PTS	4	Apr 8, 1924	Civic Auditorium, Fresno, California, U.S.	
38	Draw	27–4–7	Joe Chaney	PTS	4	Mar 17, 1924	I.D.E.S. Hall, Tulare, California, U.S.	
37	Draw	27–4–6	J Roberts	PTS	4	Mar 6, 1924	Pasenda, California, U.S.	
36	Draw	27–4–5	Benny Berris	PTS	4	Mar 4, 1924	Civic Auditorium, Fresno, California, U.S.	
35	Win	27–4–4	Joe Bell	PTS	4	Jan 30, 1924	Merced A.C., Merced, California, U.S.	
34	Loss	26–4–4	Trench King	PTS	4	Dec 29, 1923	Civic Auditorium, Fresno, California, U.S.	
33	Win	26–3–4	Eddie Haden	PTS	4	Nov 20, 1923	Civic Auditorium, Fresno, California, U.S.	
32	Win	25–3–4	Clarence Sanchez	PTS	4	Nov 11, 1923	Hanford, California, U.S.	
31	Win	24–3–4	Tommy O'Leary	PTS	4	Nov 9, 1923	L Street Arena, Sacramento, California, U.S.	
30	Win	23–3–4	Georgie Lee	PTS	4	Oct 31, 1923	Civic Auditorium, Fresno, California, U.S.	
29	Win	22–3–4	Frankie Vierra	PTS	4	Oct 16, 1923	Civic Auditorium, Fresno, California, U.S.	
28	Win	21–3–4	Young Predella	PTS	4	Sep 18, 1923	Baseball Park, Fresno, California, U.S.	
27	Draw	20–3–4	Kid Ritchie	PTS	4	Sep 14, 1923	Fairgrounds, Tulare, California, U.S.	
26	Win	20–3–3	Clarence Sanchez	KO	3 (4)	Jul 12, 1923	Hanford, California, U.S.	
25	Win	19–3–3	Eddie Mahoney	PTS	4	Jun 28, 1923	Visalia, California, U.S.	
24	Win	18–3–3	Lee Weber	PTS	4	May 22, 1923	I.D.E.S. Hall, Tulare, California, U.S.	
23	Win	17–3–3	Kid Hudson	KO	2 (4)	May 10, 1923	Hanford, California, U.S.	
22	Win	16–3–3	Joe Simas	PTS	4	Apr 26, 1923	Tulare, California, U.S.	
21	Win	15–3–3	Clarence Sanchez	PTS	4	Apr 19, 1923	Hanford, California, U.S.	
20	Win	14–3–3	Bud Riley	SD	4	Apr 6, 1923	Bakersfield Arena, Bakersfield, California, U.S.	
19	Win	13–3–3	Pat Ryan	KO	1 (4)	Feb 16, 1923	I.D.E.S. Hall, Tulare, California, U.S.	
18	Win	12–3–3	Lee Weber	PTS	4	Feb 9, 1923	Hanford, California, U.S.	
17	Win	11–3–3	Jimmy Brady	PTS	4	Feb 6, 1923	Civic Auditorium, Fresno, California, U.S.	
16	Win	10–3–3	Billy Cole	KO	2 (4)	Jan 23, 1923	Civic Auditorium, Fresno, California, U.S.	
15	Win	9–3–3	Billy Jordan	TKO	2 (4)	Jan 9, 1923	Civic Auditorium, Fresno, California, U.S.	
14	Win	8–3–3	Eddie O'Connel	PTS	4	Oct 24, 1922	I.D.E.S. Hall, Tulare, California, U.S.	
13	Win	7–3–3	Kid Swan	KO	2 (4)	Jan 20, 1922	I.D.E.S. Hall, Tulare, California, U.S.	
12	Draw	6–3–3	Kid Hardy	PTS	4	Dec 15, 1921	Tulare, California, U.S.	
11	Loss	6–3–2	Eddie McGovern	PTS	4	Sep 27, 1921	Civic Auditorium, Fresno, California, U.S.	
10	Win	6–2–2	Young Peters	PTS	4	Jan 10, 1921	Porterville, California, U.S.	
9	Win	5–2–2	Terry McGovern	PTS	4	Sep 28, 1920	Civic Auditorium, Fresno, California, U.S.	
8	Win	4–2–2	Kid Chris	KO	2 (4)	Jul 23, 1920	Fresno, California, U.S.	
7	Win	3–2–2	Kid Chris	PTS	4	Jul 2, 1920	Fresno, California, U.S.	
6	Win	2–2–2	Terry Hogan	PTS	4	Jul 1, 1920	Fresno, California, U.S.	
5	Draw	1–2–2	Terry Hogan	PTS	4	Jun 18, 1920	Fresno, California, U.S.	
4	Loss	1–2–1	Eddie Morris	KO	3 (4)	Feb 5, 1920	Marysville, California, U.S.	
3	Loss	1–1–1	Jack O'Keefe	KO	3 (4)	Jan 13, 1920	Floral A.C., San Mateo, California, U.S.	
2	Draw	1–0–1	Kid Jeffries	PTS	4	Oct 3, 1919	Fresno, California, U.S.	
1	Win	1–0	Young McGovern	PTS	4	Sep 28, 1919	Fresno, California, U.S.	

== Titles in boxing ==
=== Major world titles ===
- NYSAC welterweight champion (147 lbs)
- NBA (WBA) welterweight champion (147 lbs)

=== The Ring magazine titles ===
- The Ring welterweight champion (147 lbs)

=== Undisputed titles ===
- Undisputed welterweight champion

== See also ==
- List of welterweight boxing champions
- List of middleweight boxing champions

== Bibliography ==
- James B. Roberts, Alexander G. Skutt, The Boxing Register: International Boxing Hall of Fame Official Record Book, McBooks Press, 2006
- David L. Hudson Jr., Combat Sports: An Encyclopedia of Wrestling, Fighting, and Mixed Martial Arts, ABC-CLIO, 2009

Awards and achievements
Preceded by Jackie Fields	World Welterweight Champion; February 22, 1933 – May 29, 1933	Succeeded by Jimmy McLarnin
