= Ceferino Garcia =

Filipino boxer (1906–1981)

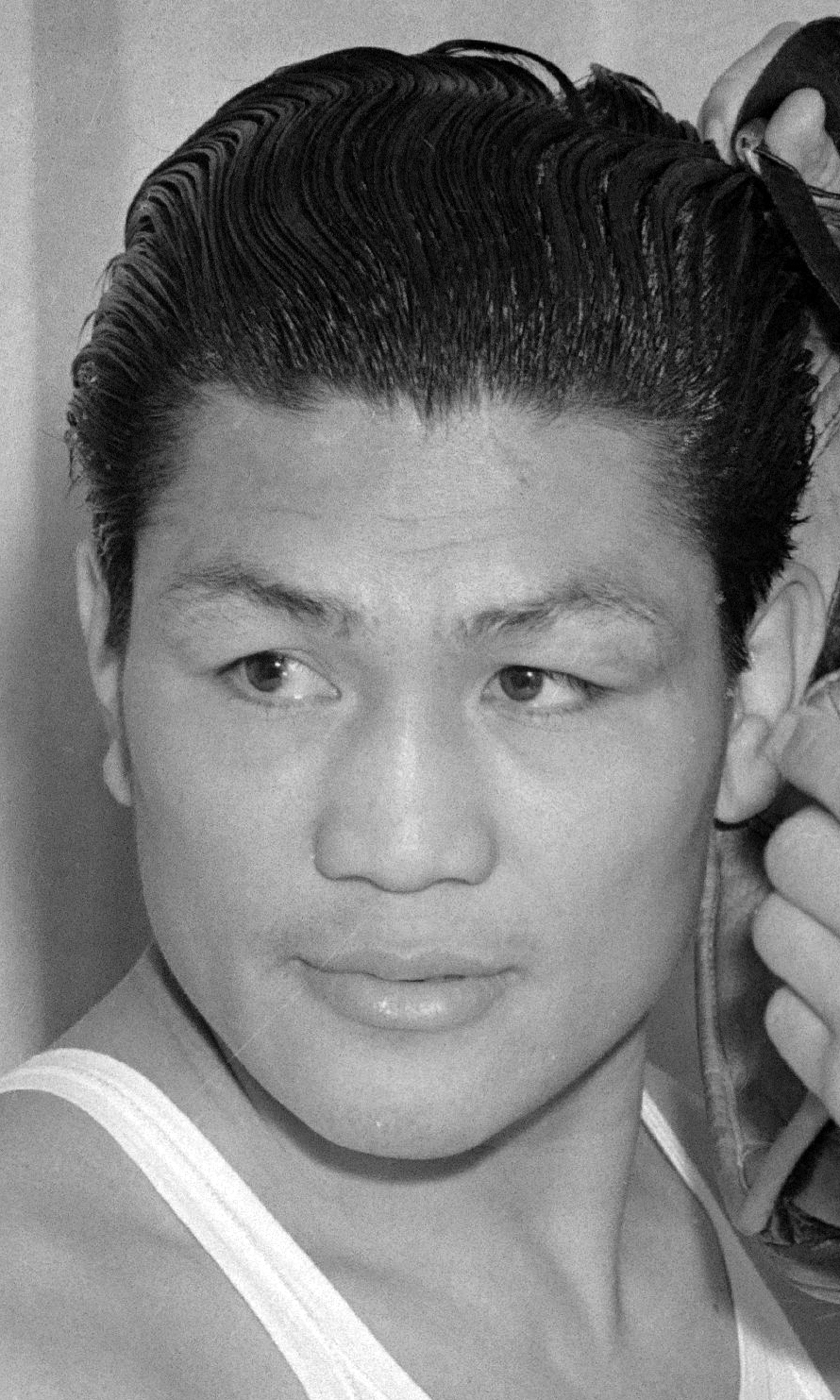

Personal information
- Nicknames: Bolo Punch; Pedro
- Nationality: Filipino
- Born: Ceferino Montano Garcia; August 26, 1906 Naval, Biliran, Philippine Islands
- Died: January 1, 1981 (aged 74) San Diego, California, United States
- Height: 5 ft 7 in (1.70 m)
- Weight: Middleweight

Boxing career
- Stance: Orthodox

Boxing record
- Total fights: 164
- Wins: 120
- Win by KO: 76
- Losses: 30
- Draws: 14

Ceferino Montano Garcia (August 26, 1906 – January 1, 1981) was a champion boxer born in Naval, Biliran, Philippines. He holds the most victories ever achieved by a Filipino boxer and is also the only boxer from the Philippines to become world champion in the middleweight division. Garcia is commonly credited to as the first well known user of the bolo punch, which was later popularized by Cuban fighter Kid Gavilán. He was inducted into The Ring magazine Hall of Fame in 1977 and the World Boxing Hall of Fame in 1989.

== Early life ==
Ceferino Garcia was the son of Fortunato Garcia and Pascuala Montano and was the oldest of six children. He never completed first grade and indulged rather frequently in gambling. At 17, he was feared by so many that nobody would take him in a street fight. He was also a skilled blacksmith.

== Boxing success ==
While working at a bakery in Cebu City, Garcia met a boxing promoter. This was where his career as boxer started.

On September 23, 1937, Garcia first had a shot for a world title in the welterweight division. However, Barney Ross bested him by unanimous decision.

On October 2, 1939, Garcia fought Fred Apostoli for the world Middleweight title in the United States and won it by TKO in the 7th round. He defended that title three times until he lost to Ken Overlin on points. He was managed, during the final years of his career by George Parnassus.

== Life after boxing ==
After retiring from the ring he made a few uncredited appearances in Hollywood films with the exception of "Joe Palooka, Champ" in which he plays himself. He was also employed for a time by actress Mae West as her chauffeur and bodyguard.

During the 1930s and 1940s, Garcia lived on 1042 S. Rowan St., in the Boyle Heights neighborhood of Los Angeles.

Garcia died on January 1, 1981, while in San Diego, California. His grave is located at Valhalla Memorial Park Cemetery in North Hollywood, California.

== Professional boxing record ==
164 fights	120 wins	30 losses
By knockout	76	6
By decision	41	23
By disqualification	3	1
Draws	14	

No.	Result	Record	Opponent	Type	Round	Date	Location	Notes
164	Loss	120–30–14	Bill McDowell	PTS	10	Jan 15, 1945	City Auditorium, Houston, Texas, U.S.	
163	Win	120–29–14	George Baratko	KO	3 (?)	Oct 16, 1944	Houston, Texas, U.S.	
162	Win	119–29–14	Kid Azteca	PTS	10	Oct 6, 1944	Arena Coliseo, Mexico City, Distrito Federal, Mexico	
161	Win	118–29–14	Willis Johnson	TKO	10 (10)	Sep 25, 1944	Ocean Park Arena, Santa Monica, California, U.S.	
160	Loss	117–29–14	California Jackie Wilson	UD	10	Feb 24, 1942	Olympic Auditorium, Los Angeles, California, U.S.	
159	Loss	117–28–14	Anton Christoforidis	PTS	10	Dec 1, 1941	Arena, Cleveland, Ohio, U.S.	
158	Draw	117–27–14	Billy Soose	TD	8 (12)	Sep 15, 1941	Gilmore Field, Los Angeles, California, U.S.	
157	Win	117–27–13	Bobby Pacho	KO	3 (10)	Aug 19, 1941	Ryan's Auditorium, Fresno, California, U.S.	
156	Win	116–27–13	Jimmy Casino	TKO	8 (10)	Jul 11, 1941	Legion Stadium, Hollywood, California, U.S.	
155	Loss	115–27–13	Steve Belloise	PTS	10	Sep 12, 1940	Madison Square Garden, New York City, New York, U.S.	
154	Loss	115–26–13	Ken Overlin	UD	15	May 23, 1940	Madison Square Garden, New York City, New York, U.S.	Lost NYSAC middleweight title
153	Win	115–25–13	Allen Matthews	TKO	4 (10)	Apr 24, 1940	Municipal Auditorium, Kansas City, Missouri, U.S.	
152	Draw	114–25–13	Henry Armstrong	PTS	10	Mar 1, 1940	Gilmore Stadium, Los Angeles, California, U.S.	Billed as a World Middleweight Title fight recognized only by California
151	Win	114–25–12	Glen Lee	TKO	13 (15)	Dec 23, 1939	Rizal Memorial Sports Complex, Manila, Metro Manila, Philippines	Retained NYSAC middleweight title
150	Win	113–25–12	Fred Apostoli	KO	7 (15)	Oct 2, 1939	Madison Square Garden, New York City, New York, U.S.	Won NYSAC middleweight title
149	Win	112–25–12	Bobby Pacho	KO	5 (10)	Aug 8, 1939	Olympic Auditorium, Los Angeles, California, U.S.	
148	Win	111–25–12	Bobby Pacho	PTS	10	Jul 4, 1939	Civic Auditorium, Stockton, California, U.S.	
147	Win	110–25–12	Walter Woods	KO	4 (10)	Jun 15, 1939	Madison Square Garden, New York City, New York, U.S.	
146	Win	109–25–12	Al Romero	TKO	10 (10)	Apr 21, 1939	Legion Stadium, Hollywood, California, U.S.	
145	Win	108–25–12	Chief Parris	KO	3 (10)	Mar 28, 1939	Civic Auditorium, Stockton, California, U.S.	
144	Win	107–25–12	Lloyd Marshall	TKO	5 (10)	Mar 17, 1939	Dreamland Auditorium, San Francisco, California, U.S.	
143	Win	106–25–12	Lloyd Marshall	PTS	10	Feb 22, 1939	Dreamland Auditorium, San Francisco, California, U.S.	
142	Win	105–25–12	Al Trulmans	KO	2 (10)	Feb 7, 1939	Civic Auditorium, San Jose, California, U.S.	
141	Win	104–25–12	Dick Foster	TKO	8 (10)	Jan 27, 1939	Legion Stadium, Hollywood, California, U.S.	
140	Loss	103–25–12	Henry Armstrong	UD	15	Nov 25, 1938	Madison Square Garden, New York City, New York, U.S.	For NYSAC, NBA, and The Ring welterweight titles
139	Win	103–24–12	Jackie Burke	TKO	2 (15)	Jul 25, 1938	Ogden Stadium, Ogden, Utah, U.S.	
138	Win	102–24–12	Jackie Burke	KO	4 (10)	Jul 4, 1938	Stockton, California, U.S.	
137	Win	101–24–12	Frankie Blair	TKO	3 (10)	Jun 17, 1938	Gilmore Stadium, Los Angeles, California, U.S.	
136	Win	100–24–12	Glen Lee	PTS	10	May 6, 1938	Gilmore Stadium, Los Angeles, California, U.S.	
135	Win	99–24–12	Tony Roccaforte	KO	1 (10)	Mar 25, 1938	Civic Auditorium, Honolulu, Hawaii	
134	Win	98–24–12	Otto Blackwell	KO	9 (10)	Mar 19, 1938	Lihue, Honolulu, Hawaii	
133	Win	97–24–12	Otto Blackwell	KO	7 (10)	Mar 12, 1938	Civic Auditorium, Honolulu, Hawaii	
132	Win	96–24–12	Manuel Victoria	KO	4 (10)	Feb 18, 1938	Coliseum, San Diego, California, U.S.	
131	Win	95–24–12	Mickey Serrian	KO	2 (10)	Jan 28, 1938	Legion Stadium, Hollywood, California, U.S.	
130	Win	94–24–12	Otto Blackwell	KO	2 (10)	Jan 1, 1938	Pismo Beach Arena, Pismo Beach, California, U.S.	
129	Loss	93–24–12	Barney Ross	UD	15	Sep 23, 1937	Polo Grounds, New York City, New York, U.S.	For NYSAC, NBA, and The Ring welterweight titles
128	Win	93–23–12	Bobby Pacho	TKO	9 (10)	Jul 22, 1937	Madison Square Garden, New York City, New York, U.S.	
127	Win	92–23–12	Phil Furr	PTS	10	Jun 11, 1937	Legion Stadium, Hollywood, California, U.S.	
126	Win	91–23–12	George Salvadore	PTS	10	May 21, 1937	Legion Stadium, Hollywood, California, U.S.	
125	Win	90–23–12	Phil McQuillan	KO	2 (10)	May 7, 1937	Civic Auditorium, Watsonville, California, U.S.	
124	Win	89–23–12	Aaron Wade	TKO	1 (10)	Mar 23, 1937	Civic Auditorium, San Jose, California, U.S.	
123	Loss	88–23–12	Glen Lee	PTS	10	Feb 23, 1937	Olympic Auditorium, Los Angeles, California, U.S.	
122	Win	88–22–12	Chief Parris	KO	4 (10)	Feb 5, 1937	Legion Stadium, Hollywood, California, U.S.	
121	Win	87–22–12	Otto Blackwell	KO	1 (10)	Jan 12, 1937	Civic Auditorium, Stockton, California, U.S.	
120	Win	86–22–12	Ray Acosta	KO	1 (10)	Dec 18, 1936	Pismo Beach Arena, Pismo Beach, California, U.S.	
119	Draw	85–22–12	Izzy Jannazzo	PTS	15	Oct 30, 1936	Madison Square Garden, New York City, New York, U.S.	
118	Win	85–22–11	Cleto Locatelli	PTS	10	Sep 11, 1936	Madison Square Garden, New York City, New York, U.S.	
117	Win	84–22–11	Leon Zorrita	KO	5 (10)	Aug 11, 1936	Olympic Auditorium, Los Angeles, California, U.S.	
116	Win	83–22–11	Kid Azteca	KO	5 (10)	Jul 17, 1936	Legion Stadium, Hollywood, California, U.S.	
115	Win	82–22–11	Young Peter Jackson	PTS	10	Jun 9, 1936	Olympic Auditorium, Los Angeles, California, U.S.	
114	Win	81–22–11	Jackie Burke	TKO	8 (10)	May 8, 1936	Legion Stadium, Hollywood, California, U.S.	
113	Win	80–22–11	Lou Halper	TKO	6 (10)	Mar 27, 1936	Legion Stadium, Hollywood, California, U.S.	
112	Draw	79–22–11	Jackie Burke	PTS	10	Mar 2, 1936	Orpheum Theatre, Ogden, Utah, U.S.	
111	Win	79–22–10	Gordon Wallace	PTS	10	Feb 7, 1936	Legion Stadium, Hollywood, California, U.S.	
110	Loss	78–22–10	Al Manfredo	PTS	10	Jan 13, 1936	Auditorium, Oakland, California, U.S.	Lost USA California State welterweight title
109	Loss	78–21–10	Barney Ross	UD	10	Nov 29, 1935	Chicago Stadium, Chicago, Illinois, U.S.	
108	Win	78–20–10	Gordon Wallace	MD	12	Nov 20, 1935	Arena, Vancouver, British Columbia, Canada	
107	Win	77–20–10	Otto Blackwell	PTS	10	Nov 12, 1935	Ice Coliseum, Portland, Oregon, U.S.	
106	Draw	76–20–10	Gordon Wallace	PTS	10	Oct 23, 1935	Arena, Vancouver, British Columbia, Canada	
105	Win	76–20–9	Joe Bernal	PTS	10	Oct 18, 1935	Dreamland Auditorium, San Francisco, California, U.S.	
104	Loss	75–20–9	Barney Ross	PTS	10	Sep 13, 1935	Dreamland Auditorium, San Francisco, California, U.S.	
103	Win	75–19–9	Sammy Brown	KO	3 (10)	Aug 16, 1935	Frank Chance Field, Fresno, California, U.S.	
102	Win	74–19–9	Baby Joe Gans	KO	3 (10)	Jul 19, 1935	Pismo Beach Arena, Pismo Beach, California, U.S.	
101	Win	73–19–9	Sammy O'Dell	KO	5 (10)	Jul 4, 1935	Stockton, California, U.S.	
100	Win	72–19–9	Al Romero	PTS	10	Jun 21, 1935	Legion Stadium, Hollywood, California, U.S.	
99	Win	71–19–9	Meyer Grace	KO	1 (10)	May 31, 1935	Watsonville, California, U.S.	
98	Win	70–19–9	Al Manfredo	PTS	10	May 17, 1935	Legion Stadium, Hollywood, California, U.S.	
97	Win	69–19–9	Guy McKinney	KO	1 (10)	Apr 26, 1935	Pismo Beach Arena, Pismo Beach, California, U.S.	
96	Loss	68–19–9	Al Manfredo	PTS	10	Apr 18, 1935	L Street Arena, Sacramento, California, U.S.	
95	Win	68–18–9	Baby Joe Gans	KO	1 (10)	Mar 26, 1935	Civic Auditorium, Stockton, California, U.S.	Retained USA California State welterweight title
94	Loss	67–18–9	Bep van Klaveren	PTS	10	Dec 7, 1934	Legion Stadium, Hollywood, California, U.S.	
93	Win	67–17–9	Manuel Victoria	KO	3 (10)	Nov 16, 1934	Civic Auditorium, Watsonville, California, U.S.	
92	Win	66–17–9	Bep van Klaveren	PTS	10	Oct 30, 1934	Olympic Auditorium, Los Angeles, California, U.S.	
91	Win	65–17–9	Erwin Bige	KO	2 (10)	Sep 28, 1934	Civic Auditorium, Watsonville, California, U.S.	
90	Win	64–17–9	Flash Butler	KO	2 (10)	Sep 24, 1934	Bakersfield Arena, Bakersfield, California, U.S.	Won vacant USA California State welterweight title
89	Win	63–17–9	Tony Roccaforte	KO	2 (10)	Sep 11, 1934	Ryan's Auditorium, Fresno, California, U.S.	
88	Win	62–17–9	Joe Glick	KO	2 (10)	Sep 1, 1934	Pismo Beach Arena, Pismo Beach, California, U.S.	
87	Win	61–17–9	Jimmy Evans	PTS	10	Aug 9, 1934	Memorial Auditorium, Sacramento, California, U.S.	
86	Win	60–17–9	Mike Payan	TKO	1 (10)	Jul 27, 1934	Legion Stadium, Hollywood, California, U.S.	
85	Win	59–17–9	Andy DiVodi	KO	1 (10)	Jul 3, 1934	Civic Auditorium, Stockton, California, U.S.	
84	Win	58–17–9	Tommy Herman	KO	3 (10)	Jun 14, 1934	Memorial Auditorium, Sacramento, California, U.S.	
83	Win	57–17–9	Billy Boggs	TKO	5 (10)	Jun 1, 1934	Legion Stadium, Hollywood, California, U.S.	
82	Win	56–17–9	Johnny Martinez	TKO	3 (10)	May 18, 1934	Civic Auditorium, Watsonville, California, U.S.	
81	Win	55–17–9	Tommy Martinez	KO	4 (10)	May 4, 1934	Madison Square Garden, Phoenix, Arizona, U.S.	
80	Win	54–17–9	Baby Sal Sorio	KO	4 (10)	Apr 20, 1934	Olympic Auditorium, Los Angeles, California, U.S.	
79	Loss	53–17–9	Young Peter Jackson	KO	3 (10)	Apr 10, 1934	Olympic Auditorium, Los Angeles, California, U.S.	Lost USA California State welterweight title
78	Win	53–16–9	Tommy Herman	KO	2 (10)	Mar 23, 1934	Pismo Beach Arena, Pismo Beach, California, U.S.	
77	Win	52–16–9	Eddie Cerda	TKO	6 (10)	Mar 6, 1934	Olympic Auditorium, Los Angeles, California, U.S.	
76	Win	51–16–9	Paulie Walker	PTS	10	Feb 9, 1934	Legion Stadium, Hollywood, California, U.S.	Retained USA California State welterweight title
75	Win	50–16–9	Bobby Pacho	KO	3 (10)	Jan 16, 1934	Olympic Auditorium, Los Angeles, California, U.S.	
74	Win	49–16–9	Mike Payan	PTS	10	Dec 22, 1933	Coliseum, San Diego, California, U.S.	Retained USA California State welterweight title
73	Win	48–16–9	Baby Joe Gans	PTS	10	Dec 12, 1933	Olympic Auditorium, Los Angeles, California, U.S.	
72	Win	47–16–9	Vincent Martinez	PTS	6	Nov 25, 1933	Main Street Athletic Club, Los Angeles, California, U.S.	
71	Loss	46–16–9	Andy Callahan	PTS	10	Oct 27, 1933	Dreamland Auditorium, San Francisco, California, U.S.	
70	Win	46–15–9	King Tut	KO	7 (10)	Oct 13, 1933	Legion Stadium, Hollywood, California, U.S.	Retained USA California State welterweight title
69	Win	45–15–9	Meyer Grace	KO	10 (10)	Sep 22, 1933	Legion Stadium, Hollywood, California, U.S.	Retained USA California State welterweight title
68	Win	44–15–9	Eddie Frisco	TKO	7 (10)	Aug 25, 1933	Legion Stadium, Hollywood, California, U.S.	
67	Loss	43–15–9	Kid Azteca	TKO	8 (10)	Jul 25, 1933	Olympic Auditorium, Los Angeles, California, U.S.	
66	Win	43–14–9	Lloyd Smith	KO	4 (10)	Jul 18, 1933	Stockton, California, U.S.	
65	Loss	42–14–9	Kid Azteca	PTS	10	Jul 11, 1933	Olympic Auditorium, Los Angeles, California, U.S.	
64	Win	42–13–9	Johnny Martinez	KO	5 (10)	Jul 3, 1933	Stockton, California, U.S.	
63	Loss	41–13–9	Eddie Ran	DQ	3 (10)	May 29, 1933	Wrigley Field, Los Angeles, California, U.S.	
62	Win	41–12–9	Leonard Bennett	PTS	6	May 9, 1933	Civic Ice Arena, Seattle, Washington, U.S.	
61	Win	40–12–9	Howard Fritz	TKO	8 (10)	Apr 28, 1933	Coliseum, San Diego, California, U.S.	
60	Win	39–12–9	Tommy Huffman	PTS	10	Apr 19, 1933	Coliseum, San Diego, California, U.S.	
59	Win	38–12–9	Jesus Macias	KO	1 (10)	Apr 12, 1933	Coliseum, San Diego, California, U.S.	
58	Draw	37–12–9	Mike Payan	PTS	10	Mar 24, 1933	Coliseum, San Diego, California, U.S.	Retained USA California State welterweight title
57	Win	37–12–8	Johnny Romero	PTS	10	Mar 10, 1933	Coliseum, San Diego, California, U.S.	
56	Win	36–12–8	Frankie Diaz	KO	2 (10)	Mar 3, 1933	Coliseum, San Diego, California, U.S.	Retained USA California State welterweight title
55	Win	35–12–8	Johnny Romero	KO	8 (10)	Feb 10, 1933	Coliseum, San Diego, California, U.S.	Won USA California State welterweight title
54	Win	34–12–8	Charlie Cobb	TKO	5 (10)	Jan 27, 1933	Coliseum, San Diego, California, U.S.	
53	Loss	33–12–8	Tommy King	PTS	10	Jan 20, 1933	Dreamland Auditorium, San Francisco, California, U.S.	
52	Win	33–11–8	Andy DiVodi	KO	4 (10)	Nov 22, 1932	Ryan's Auditorium, Fresno, California, U.S.	
51	Loss	32–11–8	Young Corbett III	PTS	10	Oct 25, 1932	Civic Auditorium, Fresno, California, U.S.	
50	Loss	32–10–8	Freddie Steele	KO	2 (4)	Sep 20, 1932	Olympic Auditorium, Los Angeles, California, U.S.	
49	Draw	32–9–8	Tommy King	PTS	10	Sep 2, 1932	Legion Stadium, Hollywood, California, U.S.	
48	Draw	32–9–7	Jimmy Britt	MD	6	Jul 13, 1932	Civic Ice Arena, Seattle, Washington, U.S.	
47	Win	32–9–6	Oakland Jimmy Duffy	TKO	7 (10)	Jun 22, 1932	Auditorium, Oakland, California, U.S.	
46	Loss	31–9–6	Joey Goodman	PTS	10	May 24, 1932	Olympic Auditorium, Los Angeles, California, U.S.	
45	Loss	31–8–6	Freddie Steele	KO	2 (6)	May 18, 1932	Civic Ice Arena, Seattle, Washington, U.S.	
44	Win	31–7–6	David Velasco	PTS	10	May 6, 1932	Pismo Beach Arena, Pismo Beach, California, U.S.	
43	Loss	30–7–6	Young Corbett III	PTS	10	Apr 12, 1932	Olympic Auditorium, Los Angeles, California, U.S.	
42	Win	30–6–6	Joe Saldivar	KO	1 (10)	Apr 1, 1932	Pismo Beach Arena, Pismo Beach, California, U.S.	
41	Loss	29–6–6	Tommy Herman	TKO	10 (10)	Mar 11, 1932	Stockton, California, U.S.	
40	Win	29–5–6	Vearl Whitehead	TKO	7 (10)	Feb 19, 1932	Legion Stadium, Hollywood, California, U.S.	
39	Win	28–5–6	David Velasco	PTS	10	Jan 26, 1932	Olympic Auditorium, Los Angeles, California, U.S.	
38	Win	27–5–6	Alfredo Gaona	TKO	4 (10)	Jan 19, 1932	Olympic Auditorium, Los Angeles, California, U.S.	
37	Win	26–5–6	Tony Gora	PTS	10	Nov 14, 1931	Olympic Stadium, Manila, Metro Manila, Philippines	
36	Win	25–5–6	Ignacio Fernandez	PTS	12	Jul 18, 1931	Manila, Metro Manila, Philippines	
35	Win	24–5–6	Ignacio Fernandez	DQ	9 (12)	May 16, 1931	Olympic Stadium, Manila, Metro Manila, Philippines	
34	Win	23–5–6	Frank Malinao	PTS	12	Apr 18, 1931	Manila, Metro Manila, Philippines	
33	Win	22–5–6	Joe Hall	PTS	12	Mar 7, 1931	Olympic Stadium, Manila, Metro Manila, Philippines	
32	Loss	21–5–6	Jimmy Hill	PTS	12	Dec 22, 1928	Olympic Stadium, Manila, Metro Manila, Philippines	
31	Win	21–4–6	Joe Sacramento	KO	4 (?)	Nov 26, 1928	Manila, Metro Manila, Philippines	
30	Draw	20–4–6	Irineo Flores	PTS	10	Oct 3, 1928	Fort Stotsenburg, Barangay Sapang Bato, Angeles City, Philippines	
29	Win	20–4–5	Joe Hall	DQ	6 (12)	Aug 4, 1928	Olympic Stadium, Manila, Pampanga, Philippines	
28	Loss	19–4–5	Kid Moro	PTS	12	Apr 28, 1928	Manila, Pampanga, Philippines	Lost Orient welterweight title
27	Win	19–3–5	Luis Logan	PTS	12	Feb 18, 1928	Olympic Stadium, Manila, Pampanga, Philippines	Won Orient welterweight title
26	Win	18–3–5	Young Harry Wills	PTS	12	Dec 10, 1927	Manila, Pampanga, Philippines	
25	Win	17–3–5	Joe Sacramento	KO	4 (?)	Nov 26, 1927	Olympic Stadium, Manila, Pampanga, Philippines	
24	Win	16–3–5	Irineo Flores	PTS	12	Jul 9, 1927	Olympic Stadium, Manila, Pampanga, Philippines	
23	Win	15–3–5	Pedro Campo	PTS	12	Jun 18, 1927	Olympic Stadium, Manila, Pampanga, Philippines	
22	Win	14–3–5	Pedro Campo	PTS	12	May 7, 1927	Olympic Stadium, Manila, Pampanga, Philippines	
21	Win	13–3–5	Ignacio Fernandez	PTS	12	Feb 26, 1927	Manila, Pampanga, Philippines	
20	Draw	12–3–5	Harry Stone	PTS	10	Dec 18, 1926	Malabon City, Metro Manila, Philippines	
19	Loss	12–3–4	Kid Moro	PTS	12	Nov 6, 1926	Manila, Pampanga, Philippines	
18	Loss	12–2–4	Irineo Flores	PTS	12	Sep 18, 1926	Olympic Stadium, Manila, Pampanga, Philippines	For vacant Orient lightweight title
17	Win	12–1–4	Harry Stone	PTS	12	Sep 4, 1926	Manila, Pampanga, Philippines	
16	Draw	11–1–4	Irineo Flores	PTS	12	Jul 3, 1926	Olympic Stadium, Manila, Pampanga, Philippines	For vacant Orient lightweight title
15	Draw	11–1–3	Irineo Flores	PTS	12	May 29, 1926	Olympic Stadium, Manila, Pampanga, Philippines	
14	Win	11–1–2	Fighting Nelson	PTS	12	Mar 6, 1926	Olympic Stadium, Manila, Pampanga, Philippines	
13	Win	10–1–2	Fighting Nelson	DQ	3 (?)	Feb 6, 1926	Manila, Pampanga, Philippines	
12	Win	9–1–2	Irineo Boison	PTS	12	Jan 16, 1926	Manila, Pampanga, Philippines	
11	Win	8–1–2	Max Jim	KO	1 (?)	Jan 2, 1926	Olympic Stadium, Manila, Pampanga, Philippines	
10	Win	7–1–2	Jimmy Hall	KO	4 (?)	Dec 19, 1925	Manila, Pampanga, Philippines	
9	Draw	6–1–2	Young Harry Wills	PTS	6	Nov 14, 1925	Olympic Stadium, Manila, Pampanga, Philippines	
8	Win	6–1–1	Pedro Syap	TKO	1 (?)	Oct 31, 1925	Olympic Stadium, Manila, Pampanga, Philippines	
7	Win	5–1–1	Terrible Dagua	TKO	4 (?)	Oct 17, 1925	Olympic Stadium, Manila, Pampanga, Philippines	
6	Win	4–1–1	Harry Tunney	PTS	6	Oct 3, 1925	Olympic Stadium, Manila, Pampanga, Philippines	
5	Loss	3–1–1	Antonio Garcia	TKO	4 (?)	Jun 28, 1924	Manila, Pampanga, Philippines	
4	Win	3–0–1	Cornelio Coronel	KO	3 (?)	Jun 14, 1924	Manila, Pampanga, Philippines	
3	Win	2–0–1	G Vargas	PTS	4	Sep 22, 1923	Olympic Stadium, Manila, Pampanga, Philippines	
2	Win	1–0–1	M Flores	PTS	4	May 12, 1923	Olympic Stadium, Manila, Pampanga, Philippines	
1	Draw	0–0–1	Pedro del Mundo	PTS	6	May 5, 1923	Olympic Stadium, Manila, Pampanga, Philippines	

Awards and achievements
Preceded by Fred Apostoli	NYSAC World Middleweight Champion; Oct 2, 1939– May 23, 1940	Succeeded by Ken Overlin
