= Baby Joe Gans =

American boxer (1898–1959)

Personal information
- Born: El Paso, Texas, U.S.
- Died: April 20, 1959 Milwaukee, Wisconsin, U.S.
- Height: 5 ft 6 in (168 cm)
- Weight: Lightweight; Light welterweight Welterweight; Middleweight

Boxing career
- Stance: Southpaw

Boxing record
- Total fights: 173
- Wins: 133
- Win by KO: 57
- Losses: 25
- Draws: 15

Baby Joe Gans (born Gerald Slaughter; died April 20, 1959) was an American professional boxer from 1922 to 1937. He held the Colored Pacific Coast lightweight title in 1926. Gans was also ranked by The Ring as the world's No. 1 contender at light welterweight in 1930 and welterweight in 1931.

By December 1925, contemporary reports were already referring to Gans as the Colored Pacific Coast lightweight and welterweight champion. He was also reportedly designated the Colored junior welterweight champion by The Ring magazine.

== Early life ==
As a youngster, Gans sold newspapers on the streets of Los Angeles. Before taking up boxing, he also worked as an expert iron moulder at a large local plant.

== Boxing career ==
As an amateur boxer, Gans won the Los Angeles newsboys' championship at the age of 14.

Gans compiled a 28–2–6 record through his first 36 professional bouts, capturing the Colored Pacific Coast lightweight title during that stretch. On April 6, 1926, he faced Billy McCann and won a decisive ten-round decision, flooring McCann near the end of the eighth round, with the bell saving him from being counted out.

In 1928, former world heavyweight champion Jack Dempsey acquired a five-figure financial interest in Gans, the first fighter in whom he had ever held such an interest. That year, Gans traveled to the East Coast for the first time and found considerable success following his Madison Square Garden debut against Jackie Brady on May 31. On November 16, he faced Joe Glick in a bout that carried the prospect of a title opportunity, as world lightweight champion Sammy Mandell had agreed to face the winner. Gans, however, lost to Glick by decision over ten rounds.

Following his move to the welterweight division, Gans faced Eddie "Kid" Wagner on March 30, 1929. He floored Wagner twice for nine-counts in the opening round, dropped him again in the third and fifth rounds, and continued his assault until the referee stopped the bout in the sixth. On March 6, 1931, Gans faced fellow rising contender Lou Brouillard, losing by decision over 10 rounds. Six fights later, Gans faced Brouillard in a rematch, by which time Brouillard had become the reigning world welterweight champion. Although Brouillard's title was not at stake, Gans fought him to a ten-round draw.

On July 3, 1934, Gans avenged his earlier defeat to Joe Glick by outpointing him over ten rounds. On September 6, 1935, Gans faced reigning world welterweight champion Barney Ross in a non-title bout at Multnomah Stadium in Portland, Oregon. Early in the second round, Gans was dropped by a left to the jaw and, after rising at the count of nine, was stopped by the referee.

Gans next faced United States Navy middleweight champion Jimmy Walsh, whom he dispatched by knockout. On December 3, 1935, he faced Manuel Victoria, hoping that an impressive victory would earn him either a rematch with Freddie Steele or a shot at world middleweight champion Babe Risko. Gans knocked out Victoria in the fifth round, but the victory failed to secure a bout with either fighter.

Among Gans's other notable opponents were former world middleweight champion Ceferino Garcia, whom he faced three times; two-time world welterweight champion Jackie Fields, whom he faced twice; and Olympic gold medalist Bep van Klaveren. Gans retired from professional boxing in 1937 with a record of 133–25–15, including 57 victories by knockout. During his career, he spent a combined five years and nine months ranked among the top ten fighters in his division by The Ring magazine between January 1928 and May 1934.

== Later life and death ==
For the final 22 years of his life, Gans worked as a boxing trainer at the Milwaukee Urban League. He died of a heart attack on April 20, 1959, just hours before he was scheduled to work the corners of two fighters on a professional boxing card.

== Professional boxing record ==
173 fights	133 wins	25 losses
By knockout	57	4
By decision	76	21
Draws	15	

No.	Result	Record	Opponent	Type	Round, time	Date	Location	Notes
173	Draw	133–25–15	Jimmy LaMarr	PTS	8	Nov 30, 1937	Avalon Arena, La Crosse, Wisconsin, U.S.	
172	Draw	133–25–14	Louis Gaulke	PTS	6	Nov 12, 1937	Auditorium, Milwaukee, Wisconsin, U.S.	
171	Draw	133–25–13	George Burnette	PTS	6	Sep 27, 1937	Auditorium, Milwaukee, Wisconsin, U.S.	
170	Win	133–25–12	Penna Randezell	PTS	6	Aug 17, 1937	State Fair Park, Milwaukee, Wisconsin, U.S.	
169	Win	132–25–12	Bobby Matthews	TKO	3 (8)	Jul 27, 1937	State Fair Park, Milwaukee, Wisconsin, U.S.	
168	Win	131–25–12	Henry Rothier	PTS	10	May 21, 1937	Avalon Arena, La Crosse, Wisconsin, U.S.	
167	Win	130–25–12	Mookie Goldman	TKO	3 (6)	May 14, 1936	Pasadena Arena, Pasadena, California, U.S.	
166	Win	129–25–12	Jack Campbell	TKO	2 (6)	May 7, 1936	Pasadena Arena, Pasadena, California, U.S.	
165	Loss	128–25–12	Al Hostak	PTS	8	Dec 17, 1935	Crystal Pool, Seattle, Washington, U.S.	
164	Win	128–24–12	Manuel Victoria	KO	5 (8)	Dec 3, 1935	Crystal Pool, Seattle, Washington, U.S.	
163	Win	127–24–12	Jimmy Walsh	TKO	3 (6)	Oct 1, 1935	Civic Ice Arena, Seattle, Washington, U.S.	
162	Loss	126–24–12	Barney Ross	KO	2 (10)	Sep 6, 1935	Multnomah Stadium, Portland, Oregon, U.S.	
161	Loss	126–23–12	Mike Payan	PTS	10	Aug 16, 1935	Coliseum, San Diego, California, U.S.	
160	Loss	126–22–12	Ceferino Garcia	KO	3 (10)	Jul 19, 1935	Pismo Beach Arena, Pismo Beach, California, U.S.	
159	Win	126–21–12	Johnny Martinez	PTS	10	Jul 9, 1935	Ryan's Auditorium, Fresno, California, U.S.	
158	Win	125–21–12	Paul Karch	PTS	10	May 17, 1935	Ice Coliseum, Portland, Oregon, U.S.	
157	Win	124–21–12	Paul Karch	PTS	6	May 10, 1935	Ice Coliseum, Portland, Oregon, U.S.	
156	Win	123–21–12	Billy Constance	PTS	10	Apr 26, 1935	Coliseum, San Diego, California, U.S.	
155	Win	122–21–12	Johnny Martinez	PTS	10	Apr 12, 1935	Coliseum, San Diego, California, U.S.	
154	Loss	121–21–12	Ceferino Garcia	KO	1 (10)	Mar 26, 1935	Civic Auditorium, Stockton, California, U.S.	For USA California State welterweight title
153	Win	121–20–12	Hal Hoxwood	PTS	6	Feb 22, 1935	Labor Temple, Portland, Oregon, U.S.	
152	Win	120–20–12	Andy DiVodi	TKO	6 (10)	Feb 7, 1935	Greenwich Coliseum, Tacoma, Washington, U.S.	
151	Loss	119–20–12	Freddie Steele	KO	3 (10)	Jan 24, 1935	Greenwich Coliseum, Tacoma, Washington, U.S.	
150	Win	119–19–12	Al Manfredo	PTS	10	Nov 13, 1934	Ryan's Auditorium, Fresno, California, U.S.	
149	Draw	118–19–12	Al Manfredo	PTS	10	Oct 23, 1934	Ryan's Auditorium, Fresno, California, U.S.	
148	Win	118–19–11	Meyer Grace	KO	3 (10)	Oct 9, 1934	Ryan's Auditorium, Fresno, California, U.S.	
147	Loss	117–19–11	Eddie Cerda	PTS	10	Aug 4, 1934	Mexico City, Mexico	
146	Loss	117–18–11	Kid Azteca	PTS	10	Jul 22, 1934	Mexico City, Mexico	
145	Win	117–17–11	Joe Glick	PTS	10	Jul 3, 1934	Colorado Springs, Colorado, U.S.	
144	Loss	116–17–11	Emilio Martinez	PTS	10	May 25, 1934	Denver, Colorado, U.S.	
143	Win	116–16–11	Billy Neiheisel	PTS	10	Mar 27, 1934	Colorado Springs, Colorado, U.S.	
142	Loss	115–16–11	Ceferino Garcia	PTS	10	Dec 12, 1933	Olympic Auditorium, Los Angeles, California, U.S.	
141	Win	115–15–11	Tommy King	PTS	10	Nov 22, 1933	Civic Auditorium, San Francisco, California, U.S.	
140	Win	114–15–11	Andy Callahan	MD	10	Oct 19, 1933	Denver, Colorado, U.S.	
139	Win	113–15–11	Jackie Purvis	KO	6 (10)	Oct 10, 1933	Denver, Colorado, U.S.	
138	Win	112–15–11	Buddy Jackson	RTD	8 (10)	Aug 29, 1933	Denver, Colorado, U.S.	
137	Win	111–15–11	Jackie Aldare	PTS	10	Aug 14, 1933	Saratoga Springs, New York, U.S.	
136	Win	110–15–11	Antonio Dominguez	PTS	10	Jul 3, 1933	Bonacker's Stadium, Rensselaer, New York, U.S.	
135	Win	109–15–11	Jack Portney	SD	10	Jun 19, 1933	Hickey Park, Millvale, Pennsylvania, U.S.	
134	Loss	108–15–11	Eddie Holmes	PTS	10	Jun 14, 1933	Cycledrome, Providence, Rhode Island, U.S.	
133	Win	108–14–11	Philly Griffin	PTS	8	May 2, 1933	Amusement Academy, Plainfield, New Jersey, U.S.	
132	Loss	107–14–11	Bep van Klaveren	PTS	8	Mar 17, 1933	Madison Square Garden, New York City, New York, U.S.	
131	Win	107–13–11	George Salvadore	KO	6 (10)	Mar 3, 1933	Mechanics Hall, Worcester, Massachusetts, U.S.	
130	Win	106–13–11	Ralph Landis	TKO	3 (?)	Jan 30, 1933	St. Nicholas Arena, New York City, New York, U.S.	
129	Win	105–13–11	Harry Devine	PTS	10	Jan 13, 1933	Mechanics Hall, Worcester, Massachusetts, U.S.	
128	Win	104–13–11	Eddie Wolfe	PTS	8	Dec 16, 1932	Madison Square Garden, New York City, New York, U.S.	
127	Win	103–13–11	Jackie Mason	KO	2 (?)	Nov 28, 1932	St. Nicholas Arena, New York City, New York, U.S.	
126	Win	102–13–11	Eddie Moore	KO	2 (8)	Oct 7, 1932	Madison Square Garden, New York City, New York, U.S.	
125	Win	101–13–11	Jay Macedon	PTS	10	Jul 29, 1932	Parkway Stadium, Hempstead, New York, U.S.	
124	Win	100–13–11	Joey Harrison	PTS	10	Jul 12, 1932	Passaic Stadium, Passaic, New Jersey, U.S.	
123	Win	99–13–11	Al Lamont	PTS	10	Jun 10, 1932	Bugle Field, Baltimore, Maryland, U.S.	
122	Win	98–13–11	Hy Diamond	TKO	7 (8)	May 20, 1932	Madison Square Garden, New York City, New York, U.S.	
121	Win	97–13–11	Ritchie Martell	KO	3 (8)	Apr 18, 1932	Waltz Dream Arena, Atlantic City, New Jersey, U.S.	
120	Win	96–13–11	Johnny Rossi	PTS	8	Mar 21, 1932	Waltz Dream Arena, Atlantic City, New Jersey, U.S.	
119	Draw	95–13–11	Al Trainor	PTS	8	Mar 10, 1932	New Broadway A.C., Philadelphia, Pennsylvania, U.S.	
118	Draw	95–13–10	Eddie Wolfe	PTS	10	Feb 19, 1932	Madison Square Garden, New York City, New York, U.S.	
117	Draw	95–13–9	Lou Brouillard	PTS	10	Dec 15, 1931	Forum, Montreal, Quebec, Canada	
116	Win	95–13–8	Mike Sarko	PTS	10	Nov 2, 1931	St. Nicholas Arena, New York City, New York, U.S.	
115	Loss	94–13–8	Eddie Ran	PTS	8	Sep 8, 1931	Queensboro Stadium, Long Island City, New York City, New York, U.S.	
114	Win	94–12–8	Eddie Ran	PTS	10	Jul 15, 1931	Shibe Park, Philadelphia, Pennsylvania, U.S.	
113	Win	93–12–8	Angel Tejeiro	PTS	10	Jun 22, 1931	Woodcliff Park, Poughkeepsie, New York, U.S.	
112	Win	92–12–8	Jackie Brady	PTS	10	Jun 9, 1931	Meyers Bowl, North Braddock, Pennsylvania, U.S.	
111	Loss	91–12–8	Lou Brouillard	PTS	10	Mar 6, 1931	Worcester, Massachusetts, U.S.	
110	Win	91–11–8	Bucky Lawless	PTS	10	Feb 27, 1931	Madison Square Garden, New York City, New York, U.S.	
109	Draw	90–11–8	Mike Rago	PTS	6	Jan 19, 1931	Convention Hall, Rochester, New York, U.S.	
108	Win	90–11–7	Babe Anderson	PTS	10	Dec 16, 1930	Olympic Auditorium, Los Angeles, California, U.S.	
107	Win	89–11–7	Vincent Hambright	PTS	10	Sep 30, 1930	Open Air Arena, Leiperville, Pennsylvania, U.S.	
106	Win	88–11–7	Young Saylor	KO	3 (10)	Sep 17, 1930	Meyers Bowl, North Braddock, Pennsylvania, U.S.	
105	Win	87–11–7	Giuseppe Reguzzoni	PTS	10	Aug 26, 1930	Hamtramck Stadium, Detroit, Michigan, U.S.	
104	Win	86–11–7	Ralph Landis	KO	1 (10)	Aug 15, 1930	Golden City Arena, Brooklyn, New York City, New York, U.S.	
103	Win	85–11–7	Eddie Murdock	PTS	10	Aug 7, 1930	Polo Grounds, New York City, New York, U.S.	
102	Win	84–11–7	Matty Mario	PTS	10	Jul 16, 1930	Dreamland Park, Newark, New Jersey, U.S.	
101	Win	83–11–7	Sergeant Sammy Baker	TKO	12	Jul 2, 1930	Taylor Bowl, Newburgh Heights, Ohio, U.S.	
100	Win	82–11–7	Paddy Creedon	KO	6 (?)	Jun 19, 1930	Dreamland Park, Newark, New Jersey, U.S.	
99	Win	81–11–7	Billy Drako	TKO	7 (10)	Feb 15, 1930	Olympia Boxing Club, New York City, New York, U.S.	
98	Win	80–11–7	Andy DiVodi	PTS	10	Feb 4, 1930	Broadway Arena, Brooklyn, New York City, New York, U.S.	
97	Win	79–11–7	Jack "Kid" Bates	KO	1 (10)	Jan 21, 1930	New Albert Theater, Baltimore, Maryland, U.S.	
96	Win	78–11–7	Martin Oroz	PTS	10	Jan 4, 1930	Olympia Boxing Club, New York City, New York, U.S.	
95	Win	77–11–7	Harry "Kid" Brown	PTS	10	Dec 25, 1929	Arena, Philadelphia, Pennsylvania, U.S.	
94	Win	76–11–7	Nat Kawler	KO	5 (10)	Dec 17, 1929	Broadway Arena, Brooklyn, New York City, New York, U.S.	
93	Loss	75–11–7	Sergeant Sammy Baker	PTS	10	Aug 6, 1929	Queensboro Stadium, Long Island City, New York City, New York, U.S.	
92	Win	75–10–7	Rudy Cedar	PTS	10	Jul 18, 1929	Bridgeville, Pennsylvania, U.S.	
91	Win	74–10–7	Harry Wallach	PTS	10	Jul 3, 1929	Dexter Park Arena, Woodhaven, New York City, New York, U.S.	
90	Win	73–10–7	Pinky Kaufman	PTS	10	Jun 5, 1929	Shibe Park, Philadelphia, Pennsylvania, U.S.	
89	Win	72–10–7	Ham Jenkins	PTS	10	May 22, 1929	Denver, Colorado, U.S.	
88	Win	71–10–7	Joe Reno	PTS	10	Apr 29, 1929	St. Nicholas Arena, New York City, New York, U.S.	
87	Win	70–10–7	Jackie Brady	KO	8 (10)	Apr 8, 1929	Arena, Philadelphia, Pennsylvania, U.S.	
86	Win	69–10–7	Eddie Wagner	KO	6 (10)	Mar 30, 1929	Olympia Boxing Club, New York City, New York, U.S.	
85	Win	68–10–7	Young Ketchell	PTS	10	Mar 25, 1929	Arena, Philadelphia, Pennsylvania, U.S.	
84	Loss	67–10–7	Jackie Fields	PTS	10	Feb 15, 1929	Madison Square Garden, New York City, New York, U.S.	
83	Win	67–9–7	Jimmy Carter	TKO	8 (10)	Jan 3, 1929	Pasadena Arena, Pasadena, California, U.S.	
82	Win	66–9–7	Charlie Rosen	PTS	10	Dec 11, 1928	Olympic Auditorium, Los Angeles, California, U.S.	
81	Loss	65–9–7	Joe Glick	PTS	10	Nov 16, 1928	Madison Square Garden, New York City, New York, U.S.	
80	Win	65–8–7	Nick Palmer	UD	10	Oct 22, 1928	Broadway Arena, Brooklyn, New York City, New York, U.S.	
79	Win	64–8–7	Billy White	PTS	10	Oct 13, 1928	Olympia Boxing Club, New York City, New York, U.S.	
78	Win	63–8–7	Andy DiVodi	TKO	9 (10)	Oct 5, 1928	Madison Square Garden, New York City, New York, U.S.	
77	Win	62–8–7	Tony Vaccarelli	PTS	10	Sep 29, 1928	Olympia Boxing Club, New York City, New York, U.S.	
76	Win	61–8–7	Cuddy DeMarco	TKO	4 (10)	Sep 17, 1928	Dexter Park Arena, Woodhaven, New York City, New York, U.S.	
75	Win	60–8–7	Harry Felix	KO	9 (10)	Aug 29, 1928	Ebbets Field, Brooklyn, New York City, New York, U.S.	
74	Win	59–8–7	Joe Trabon	PTS	10	Aug 3, 1928	Arena, Syracuse, New York, U.S.	
73	Win	58–8–7	Jackie Brady	PTS	10	Jul 16, 1928	Star Park, Syracuse, New York, U.S.	
72	Win	57–8–7	Tommy Jones	PTS	10	Jul 2, 1928	Olympic Arena, Brooklyn, New York City, New York, U.S.	
71	Win	56–8–7	Jackie Brady	PTS	10	May 31, 1928	Madison Square Garden, New York City, New York, U.S.	
70	Loss	55–8–7	Manuel Quintero	PTS	6	May 21, 1928	Polo Grounds, New York City, New York, U.S.	
69	Win	55–7–7	Jack Byrd	KO	7 (10)	Apr 27, 1928	Kansas City, Missouri, U.S.	
68	Win	54–7–7	Tommy Rios	TKO	7 (10)	Apr 3, 1928	Civic Auditorium, Fresno, California, U.S.	
67	Win	53–7–7	Hilario Martinez	PTS	10	Mar 13, 1928	Olympic Auditorium, Los Angeles, California, U.S.	
66	Loss	52–7–7	Johnny Lamar	DQ	5 (10)	Feb 9, 1928	Culver City, California, U.S.	
65	Loss	52–6–7	Vince Dundee	PTS	10	Dec 6, 1927	Olympic Auditorium, Los Angeles, California, U.S.	
64	Win	52–5–7	Charlie Feraci	KO	8 (10)	Nov 25, 1927	Coliseum, San Diego, California, U.S.	
63	Win	51–5–7	Jack Sparr	PTS	10	Nov 4, 1927	Coliseum, San Diego, California, U.S.	
62	Win	50–5–7	Arizona Joe Rivers	PTS	10	Oct 28, 1927	Golden Gate Arena, San Francisco, California, U.S.	
61	Win	49–5–7	Mike Payan	PTS	10	Oct 14, 1927	Coliseum, San Diego, California, U.S.	
60	Loss	48–5–7	Jackie Fields	PTS	10	Aug 30, 1927	Olympic Auditorium, Los Angeles, California, U.S.	
59	Win	48–4–7	Dick Ramies	KO	8 (10)	Aug 5, 1927	Coliseum, San Diego, California, U.S.	
58	Draw	47–4–7	Johnny O'Donnell	PTS	10	Jul 19, 1927	Olympic Auditorium, Los Angeles, California, U.S.	
57	Win	47–4–6	Tommy O'Brien	KO	1 (10)	Jun 21, 1927	Olympic Auditorium, Los Angeles, California, U.S.	
56	Win	46–4–6	Alfonso Gonzales	TKO	10 (10)	Jun 7, 1927	Olympic Auditorium, Los Angeles, California, U.S.	
55	Win	45–4–6	Eddie Doody	KO	4 (10)	May 20, 1927	Memorial Auditorium, Sacramento, California, U.S.	
54	Win	44–4–6	Jack Sparr	PTS	10	May 11, 1927	Wilmington Bowl, Wilmington, California, U.S.	
53	Win	43–4–6	Jimmy Schwartz	TKO	7 (10)	Apr 5, 1927	Civic Auditorium, Fresno, California, U.S.	
52	Loss	42–4–6	Tommy O'Brien	PTS	10	Mar 22, 1927	Olympic Auditorium, Los Angeles, California, U.S.	
51	Win	42–3–6	Dode Bercot	TKO	8 (10)	Mar 1, 1927	Olympic Auditorium, Los Angeles, California, U.S.	
50	Win	41–3–6	Art Emery	KO	1 (10)	Feb 10, 1927	San Bernardino, California, U.S.	
49	Win	40–3–6	Charlie Feraci	PTS	10	Jan 18, 1927	Olympic Auditorium, Los Angeles, California, U.S.	
48	Win	39–3–6	Pete Daley	TKO	5 (10)	Dec 28, 1926	Arena, Vernon, California, U.S.	
47	Loss	38–3–6	Harry "Kid" Brown	PTS	10	Dec 14, 1926	Arena, Vernon, California, U.S.	
46	Win	38–2–6	Jimmy Goodrich	PTS	10	Oct 8, 1926	Coliseum, Chicago, Illinois, U.S.	
45	Win	37–2–6	Bobby Burns	KO	7 (10)	Sep 15, 1926	Olympic Auditorium, Los Angeles, California, U.S.	
44	Win	36–2–6	Mushy Callahan	PTS	10	Aug 24, 1926	Arena, Vernon, California, U.S.	
43	Win	35–2–6	Art Emery	PTS	10	Jul 27, 1926	Civic Auditorium, Fresno, California, U.S.	
42	Win	34–2–6	Joe Layman	PTS	8	Jun 29, 1926	Arena, Vernon, California, U.S.	
41	Win	33–2–6	Sid Marks	KO	4 (8)	Jun 10, 1926	Pasadena, California, U.S.	
40	Win	32–2–6	Johnny Reisler	PTS	10	Jun 1, 1926	Civic Auditorium, Fresno, California, U.S.	
39	Win	31–2–6	Alex Hart	PTS	8	May 4, 1926	Arena, Vernon, California, U.S.	
38	Win	30–2–6	Young McGovern	PTS	10	Apr 20, 1926	Arena, Vernon, California, U.S.	
37	Win	29–2–6	Billy McCann	PTS	10	Apr 6, 1926	Civic Auditorium, Fresno, California, U.S.	
36	Win	28–2–6	Young Burmay	TKO	9 (10)	Mar 25, 1926	Pasadena, California, U.S.	
35	Win	27–2–6	Manuel Azevedo	KO	3 (10)	Mar 9, 1926	Fresno, California, U.S.	
34	Win	26–2–6	Sailor Joe Carter	KO	2 (10)	Feb 11, 1926	Pasadena, California, U.S.	
33	Win	25–2–6	Young Sam Langford	TKO	6 (10)	Feb 4, 1926	Pasadena, California, U.S.	Won Colored Pacific Coast lightweight title
32	Loss	24–2–6	Jack McCarthy	PTS	10	Jan 26, 1926	Civic Auditorium, Fresno, California, U.S.	
31	Win	24–1–6	Joe Leopold	KO	1 (8)	Jan 15, 1926	Bakersfield Arena, Bakersfield, California, U.S.	
30	Win	23–1–6	Frankie Darren	PTS	10	Dec 16, 1925	Civic Auditorium, Fresno, California, U.S.	
29	Win	22–1–6	Alex Trambitas	KO	1 (10)	Dec 3, 1925	Armory, Pasadena, California, U.S.	
28	Win	21–1–6	Min Minnich	TKO	5 (6)	Dec 1, 1925	Civic Auditorium, Fresno, California, U.S.	
27	Win	20–1–6	Gene Watson	PTS	8	Nov 6, 1925	Compton Arena, Compton, California, U.S.	
26	Draw	19–1–6	Young Papke	PTS	10	Oct 29, 1925	Armory, Pasadena, California, U.S.	
25	Win	19–1–5	Chuck Borden	KO	3 (10)	Oct 22, 1925	Pasadena, California, U.S.	
24	Draw	18–1–5	Jack Sparr	PTS	6	Oct 9, 1925	Compton Arena, Compton, California, U.S.	
23	Win	18–1–4	Sailor Fred Ackerman	TKO	6 (8)	Sep 18, 1925	Compton Arena, Compton, California, U.S.	
22	Win	17–1–4	Sailor Ashmore	PTS	10	Jun 25, 1925	Armory, Pasadena, California, U.S.	
21	Draw	16–1–4	Joe Layman	PTS	10	May 9, 1925	Lyceum A.C., Los Angeles, California, U.S.	
20	Win	16–1–3	Eddie Sylvester	TKO	9 (10)	Apr 27, 1925	Compton Arena, Compton, California, U.S.	
19	Win	15–1–3	Baby Davis	TKO	5 (10)	Apr 6, 1925	Assembly Athletic Club, Los Angeles, California, U.S.	
18	Win	14–1–3	Johnny Gerarden	PTS	6	Mar 14, 1925	Lyceum A.C., Los Angeles, California, U.S.	
17	Win	13–1–3	Mickey Russell	KO	2 (6)	Mar 7, 1925	Lyceum A.C., Los Angeles, California, U.S.	
16	Win	12–1–3	Phil Chavez	TKO	9 (10)	Mar 4, 1925	Assembly Athletic Club, Los Angeles, California, U.S.	
15	Win	11–1–3	Young Sam Langford	PTS	4	Feb 17, 1925	Arena, Vernon, California, U.S.	
14	Win	10–1–3	Soldier Gardner	PTS	4	Dec 17, 1924	Assembly Athletic Club, Los Angeles, California, U.S.	
13	Win	9–1–3	Henry Marcus	PTS	4	Dec 3, 1924	Assembly Athletic Club, Los Angeles, California, U.S.	
12	Draw	8–1–3	Joe Brown	PTS	4	May 21, 1924	Dreamland Arena, San Diego, California, U.S.	
11	Win	8–1–2	Tony Costa	KO	2 (4)	Apr 2, 1924	San Fernando Arena, San Fernando, California, U.S.	
10	Win	7–1–2	Tony Costa	KO	2 (4)	Mar 26, 1924	San Fernando, California, U.S.	
9	Win	6–1–2	Jimmy Stanley	PTS	4	Oct 8, 1923	Los Angeles, California, U.S.	
8	Draw	5–1–2	Johnny Weber	PTS	4	Aug 8, 1923	Madison Square Garden B.C., Los Angeles, California, U.S.	
7	Loss	5–1–1	Tim Callahan	PTS	4	May 4, 1923	Dreamland Rink, San Francisco, California, U.S.	
6	Draw	5–0–1	Pat Corbett	PTS	4	Mar 19, 1923	Madison Square Garden B.C., Los Angeles, California, U.S.	
5	Win	5–0	Jimmy Douglas	PTS	4	Mar 15, 1923	Urbita Boxing Club, San Bernardino, California, U.S.	
4	Win	4–0	Young Garcia	PTS	4	Jul 31, 1922	Central Avenue, Los Angeles, California, U.S.	
3	Win	3–0	Joe Flynn	PTS	4	Jul 24, 1922	Central Avenue, Los Angeles, California, U.S.	
2	Win	2–0	Joe Flynn	PTS	4	Jun 28, 1922	Madison Square Garden B.C., Los Angeles, California, U.S.	
1	Win	1–0	Kid Williams	KO	3 (4)	Jun 21, 1922	Madison Square Garden B.C., Los Angeles, California, U.S.	

== See also ==
- List of male boxers
