= Al Manfredo =

American boxer (1912–1990)

Personal information
- Born: Albert Manfredo; January 22, 1912 Fresno, California, U.S.
- Died: January 16, 1990 (aged 77) Morro Bay, California, U.S.
- Height: 5 ft 8 in (173 cm)
- Weight: Welterweight

Boxing career
- Stance: Orthodox

Boxing record
- Total fights: 105
- Wins: 74
- Win by KO: 27
- Losses: 23
- Draws: 8

Albert Manfredo (January 22, 1912 – January 16, 1990) was an American professional boxer from 1930 to 1940. He held the California State Athletic Commission welterweight title in 1936.

Manfredo notably faced two three-division world champions on multiple occasions, meeting Barney Ross twice in non-title bouts and challenging Henry Armstrong twice for the undisputed welterweight championship, losing all four bouts. He also faced former world middleweight champion Ceferino Garcia three times, outpointing him twice before capturing the California State Athletic Commission welterweight title in their third and final meeting.

== Boxing career ==
Manfredo began his professional boxing career on July 4, 1930, stopping Johnny Dennis by fourth-round technical knockout. He compiled a record of 49–1–2 through his first 52 bouts.

Nine fights later, on April 18, 1935, Manfredo faced former world middleweight champion Ceferino Garcia in the first of three meetings, defeating him by decision over ten rounds. Following the victory, Manfredo entered The Ring's welterweight rankings at No. 6. They met again four weeks later, with Garcia winning a ten-round decision.

Two fights later, Manfredo faced Al Romero. Using his boxing ability to control the action and keep Romero from landing his powerful right hand at close range, Manfredo won seven of the ten rounds to earn the decision. On January 13, 1936, he met Garcia for the third and final time, with Garcia's California State Athletic Commission welterweight title at stake. Manfredo won the rubber match by decision over ten rounds to capture the title.

On June 17, 1936, Manfredo lost a ten-round decision to former world welterweight champion Fritzie Zivic. He then faced former three-division world champion Barney Ross in a non-title bout on January 29, 1937, losing by decision over ten rounds. The two met again in another non-title bout on August 19, with Ross again winning by decision.

On December 5, 1938, Manfredo challenged another three-division world champion, Henry Armstrong, for the undisputed welterweight championship in Cleveland, Ohio. Armstrong, who had recently defended the title against Garcia, said before the fight that "Manfredo is a better boxer than Garcia." Armstrong nevertheless stopped Manfredo in the third round. They met in a rematch on October 9, 1939, with Armstrong retaining the title by fourth-round technical knockout after referee Alex Fidler stopped the bout when Manfredo was no longer adequately defending himself.

Manfredo fought twice more, splitting a pair of bouts with Freddie Dixon, before retiring in January 1940. He finished his professional career with a record of 74–23–8, including 27 victories by knockout.

== Later life and death ==
After retiring from boxing in 1940, Manfredo remained involved in the sport as a manager, working with several fighters, including former opponents Sheik Rangel and Abel Lucero.

Manfredo died on January 16, 1990, in Morro Bay, California, following a long illness. His death was attributed to natural causes.

== Personal life ==
Manfredo was a cousin of former world welterweight champion Young Corbett III. His uncle, Frank Manfredo, was also involved in boxing, working as a referee in Fresno, California.

== Professional boxing record ==
105 fights	74 wins	23 losses
By knockout	27	3
By decision	47	20
Draws	8	

No.	Result	Record	Opponent	Type	Round, time	Date	Location	Notes
105	Loss	74–23–8	Freddie Dixon	PTS	10	Jan 15, 1940	Legion Arena, Phoenix, Arizona, U.S.	
104	Win	74–22–8	Freddie Dixon	PTS	10	Dec 4, 1939	Legion Arena, Phoenix, Arizona, U.S.	
103	Loss	73–22–8	Henry Armstrong	TKO	4 (10)	Oct 9, 1939	Riverview Park, Des Moines, Iowa, U.S.	For NYSAC, NBA, and The Ring welterweight titles
102	Win	73–21–8	Lester Morris	TKO	10 (10)	Aug 29, 1939	San Jose, California, U.S.	
101	Loss	72–21–8	Sheik Rangel	PTS	10	Aug 1, 1939	Ratcliffe Stadium, Fresno, California, U.S.	
100	Win	72–20–8	Johnny Durso	PTS	10	May 29, 1939	Swiss Park Open Air Arena, Louisville, Kentucky, U.S.	
99	Win	71–20–8	Johnny Stevens	MD	10	May 22, 1939	Columbia Gymnasium Arena, Louisville, Kentucky, U.S.	
98	Loss	70–20–8	Cliff Greenwood	PTS	10	May 12, 1939	Benjamin Field Arena, Tampa, Florida, U.S.	
97	Win	70–19–8	Maxie Lucas	TKO	5 (10)	Apr 10, 1939	Legion Coliseum, Sarasota, Florida, U.S.	
96	Win	69–19–8	Johnny Dean	PTS	10	Mar 24, 1939	Legion Arena, West Palm Beach, Florida, U.S.	
95	Win	68–19–8	Johnny Durso	TKO	8 (10)	Mar 10, 1939	Legion Arena, West Palm Beach, Florida, U.S.	
94	Win	67–19–8	Mickey Serrian	PTS	10	Feb 24, 1939	Legion Arena, West Palm Beach, Florida, U.S.	
93	Loss	66–19–8	Henry Armstrong	TKO	3 (15)	Dec 5, 1938	Arena, Cleveland, Ohio, U.S.	For the NYSAC, NBA, and The Ring welterweight titles
92	Win	66–18–8	Carlos Garcia	PTS	10	Jul 19, 1938	Ratcliffe Stadium, Fresno, California, U.S.	
91	Loss	65–18–8	Eddie Booker	PTS	10	Jun 10, 1938	Dreamland Auditorium, San Francisco, California, U.S.	
90	Win	65–17–8	Chief Parris	PTS	10	Feb 9, 1938	Civic Auditorium, Fresno, California, U.S.	
89	Loss	64–17–8	Leon Zorrita	UD	10	Dec 14, 1937	Olympic Auditorium, Los Angeles, California, U.S.	
88	Win	64–16–8	Ray Vargas	PTS	10	Dec 1, 1937	Civic Auditorium, Fresno, California, U.S.	
—	Win	63–16–8	Henry Schaft	NWS	10	Oct 11, 1937	Coliseum, Des Moines, Iowa, U.S.	
87	Win	63–16–8	Henry Schaft	TKO	7 (10)	Sep 13, 1937	Coliseum, Des Moines, Iowa, U.S.	
86	Win	62–16–8	Milt Aron	SD	10	Aug 30, 1937	Marigold Gardens Outdoor Arena, Chicago, Illinois, U.S.	
—	Loss	61–16–8	Barney Ross	NWS	10	Aug 19, 1937	Western League Baseball Park, Des Moines, Iowa, U.S.	
85	Loss	61–16–8	Harold Brown	SD	10	Mar 29, 1937	Marigold Gardens, Chicago, Illinois, U.S.	
84	Loss	61–15–8	Chuck Woods	PTS	10	Mar 16, 1937	Arena Gardens, Detroit, Michigan, U.S.	
83	Loss	61–14–8	Dale Sparr	PTS	10	Mar 3, 1937	Auditorium, Oakland, California, U.S.	
82	Loss	61–13–8	Barney Ross	PTS	10	Jan 29, 1937	Olympia Stadium, Detroit, Michigan, U.S.	
81	Loss	61–12–8	Kid Azteca	PTS	10	Jan 1, 1937	El Toreo de Cuatro Caminos, Mexico City, Mexico	
80	Loss	61–11–8	Glen Lee	PTS	10	Dec 11, 1936	Legion Stadium, Hollywood, Los Angeles, U.S.	
79	Draw	61–10–8	Jackie Burke	PTS	10	Nov 2, 1936	McCullough's Arena, Salt Lake City, Utah, U.S.	
78	Draw	61–10–7	Chief Parris	PTS	10	Oct 2, 1936	Legion Stadium, Hollywood, Los Angeles, U.S.	
77	Loss	61–10–6	Abie Miller	PTS	10	Sep 22, 1936	Olympic Auditorium, Los Angeles, California, U.S.	Lost California State Athletic Commission welterweight title
76	Draw	61–9–6	Abie Miller	PTS	10	Aug 25, 1936	Olympic Auditorium, Los Angeles, California, U.S.	Retained California State Athletic Commission welterweight title
75	Loss	61–9–5	Fritzie Zivic	PTS	10	Jun 17, 1936	Municipal Auditorium, St. Louis, Missouri, U.S.	
74	Win	61–8–5	Frankie Britt	PTS	10	May 13, 1936	Auditorium, Oakland, California, U.S.	
73	Win	60–8–5	Jimmy Berres	PTS	10	May 1, 1936	Dreamland Auditorium, San Francisco, California, U.S.	
72	Loss	59–8–5	Eddie Frisco	TKO	5 (10)	Mar 25, 1936	Civic Auditorium, San Francisco, California, U.S.	
71	Win	59–7–5	Henry Firpo	KO	2 (10)	Mar 12, 1936	American Legion Hall, Los Banos, California, U.S.	
70	Loss	58–7–5	Joe Bernal	PTS	10	Feb 7, 1936	Dreamland Auditorium, San Francisco, California, U.S.	
69	Win	58–6–5	Ceferino Garcia	PTS	10	Jan 13, 1936	Auditorium, Oakland, California, U.S.	Won California State Athletic Commission welterweight title
68	Loss	57–6–5	Leon Zorrita	PTS	10	Dec 10, 1935	Olympic Auditorium, Los Angeles, California, U.S.	
67	Draw	57–5–5	Joe Bernal	PTS	10	Nov 15, 1935	Dreamland Auditorium, San Francisco, California, U.S.	
66	Loss	57–5–4	Joe Bernal	PTS	10	Sep 27, 1935	Dreamland Auditorium, San Francisco, California, U.S.	
65	Win	57–4–4	Mike Payan	PTS	10	Sep 13, 1935	Coliseum, San Diego, California, U.S.	
64	Win	56–4–4	Al Romero	PTS	10	Aug 16, 1935	Legion Stadium, Hollywood, Los Angeles, U.S.	
63	Draw	55–4–4	Bep van Klaveren	PTS	10	Jul 12, 1935	Frank Chance Field, Fresno, California, U.S.	
62	Loss	55–4–3	Ceferino Garcia	PTS	10	May 17, 1935	Legion Stadium, Hollywood, Los Angeles, U.S.	
61	Win	55–3–3	Ceferino Garcia	PTS	10	Apr 18, 1935	L-st Arena, Sacramento, California, U.S.	
60	Win	54–3–3	Gaston LeCadre	PTS	10	Feb 1, 1935	Dreamland Auditorium, San Francisco, California, U.S.	
59	Loss	53–3–3	Baby Joe Gans	PTS	10	Nov 13, 1934	Ryan's Auditorium, Fresno, California, U.S.	
58	Draw	53–2–3	Baby Joe Gans	PTS	10	Oct 23, 1934	Ryan's Auditorium, Fresno, California, U.S.	
57	Win	53–2–2	Babe Marino	PTS	10	Aug 27, 1934	Civic Auditorium, Fresno, California, U.S.	
56	Win	52–2–2	Tommy Herman	KO	4 (10)	Jun 26, 1934	Ryan's Auditorium, Fresno, California, U.S.	
55	Win	51–2–2	Mike Payan	PTS	10	May 22, 1934	Italian Entertainment Park, Fresno, California, U.S.	
54	Win	50–2–2	Herman Collins	PTS	6	Apr 30, 1934	Civic Auditorium, San Francisco, California, U.S.	
53	Loss	49–2–2	Mike Payan	PTS	10	Apr 10, 1934	Ryan's Auditorium, Fresno, California, U.S.	
52	Win	49–1–2	Sammy Mandell	KO	4 (10)	Mar 13, 1934	Ryan's Auditorium, Fresno, California, U.S.	
51	Win	48–1–2	Babe Anderson	PTS	10	Feb 13, 1934	Ryan's Auditorium, Fresno, California, U.S.	
50	Win	47–1–2	Charlie Hernandez	PTS	6	Dec 8, 1933	Dreamland Auditorium, San Francisco, California, U.S.	
49	Win	46–1–2	Baby Sal Sorio	PTS	10	Nov 28, 1933	Ryan's Auditorium, Fresno, California, U.S.	
48	Win	45–1–2	Babe Anderson	PTS	6	Oct 20, 1933	Dreamland Auditorium, San Francisco, California, U.S.	
47	Win	44–1–2	Eddie Ran	PTS	8	Jul 31, 1933	Civic Auditorium, San Francisco, California, U.S.	
46	Win	43–1–2	Red Grigry	PTS	10	Jul 18, 1933	Stockton, California, U.S.	
45	Win	42–1–2	Billy Yalotz	PTS	4	May 29, 1933	Wrigley Field, Los Angeles, California, U.S.	
44	Win	41–1–2	Billy Hughes	PTS	6	May 3, 1933	Auditorium, Oakland, California, U.S.	
43	Win	40–1–2	Johnny Freeman	KO	2 (10)	Apr 18, 1933	Ryan's Auditorium, Fresno, California, U.S.	
42	Win	39–1–2	Glen Musselman	TKO	3 (4)	Feb 22, 1933	Seals Stadium, San Francisco, California, U.S.	
41	Win	38–1–2	Red Grigry	PTS	8	Feb 7, 1933	Ryan's Auditorium, Fresno, California, U.S.	
40	Win	37–1–2	Lloyd Smith	PTS	8	Jan 24, 1933	Ryan's Auditorium, Fresno, California, U.S.	
39	Win	36–1–2	Fred Bitnoff	TKO	2 (4)	Dec 19, 1932	Exposition Auditorium, San Francisco, California, U.S.	
38	Win	35–1–2	Lloyd Smith	PTS	6	Dec 6, 1932	Ryan's Auditorium, Fresno, California, U.S.	
37	Win	34–1–2	Jimmy Gardner	PTS	6	Oct 25, 1932	Civic Auditorium, Fresno, California, U.S.	
36	Win	33–1–2	Frankie Serefino	KO	1 (6)	Aug 19, 1932	Stockton, California, U.S.	
35	Win	32–1–2	Johnny Freeman	PTS	4	May 16, 1932	Civic Auditorium, San Francisco, California, U.S.	
34	Draw	31–1–2	Cecil Jordan	PTS	4	May 6, 1932	Dreamland Auditorium, San Francisco, California, U.S.	
33	Win	31–1–1	Mickey Gibbons	TKO	4 (6)	Apr 21, 1932	Memorial Auditorium, Sacramento, California, U.S.	
32	Win	30–1–1	Don La Rue	PTS	4	Apr 12, 1932	Olympic Auditorium, Los Angeles, California, U.S.	
31	Win	29–1–1	Jack Tut	KO	2 (?)	Mar 4, 1932	Dreamland Auditorium, San Francisco, California, U.S.	
30	Win	28–1–1	Louie Rogers	TKO	3 (4)	Feb 12, 1932	Dreamland Auditorium, San Francisco, California, U.S.	
29	Win	27–1–1	Johnny Nunes	TKO	4 (4)	Jan 29, 1932	Dreamland Auditorium, San Francisco, California, U.S.	
28	Win	26–1–1	Young Casey	PTS	6	Dec 1, 1931	Ryan's Auditorium, Fresno, California, U.S.	
27	Loss	25–1–1	Guy McKenna	PTS	4	Nov 20, 1931	Dreamland Auditorium, San Francisco, California, U.S.	
26	Win	25–0–1	Pete Mazzie	KO	1 (4)	Nov 6, 1931	Dreamland Auditorium, San Francisco, California, U.S.	
25	Win	24–0–1	Les Price	TKO	2 (4)	Aug 14, 1931	Dreamland Auditorium, San Francisco, California, U.S.	
24	Win	23–0–1	Elmer Anderson	PTS	4	Jul 31, 1931	Dreamland Auditorium, San Francisco, California, U.S.	
23	Win	22–0–1	Elmer Anderson	PTS	4	Jul 17, 1931	Dreamland Auditorium, San Francisco, California, U.S.	
22	Win	21–0–1	Louie Rogers	TKO	3 (4)	Jul 10, 1931	Dreamland Auditorium, San Francisco, California, U.S.	
21	Win	20–0–1	Fred Bitnoff	PTS	4	Jun 26, 1931	Dreamland Auditorium, San Francisco, California, U.S.	
20	Win	19–0–1	Fred Bitnoff	PTS	4	Jun 5, 1931	Dreamland Auditorium, San Francisco, California, U.S.	
19	Win	18–0–1	Ernie Sheldon	PTS	4	May 7, 1931	Memorial Auditorium, Sacramento, California, U.S.	
18	Win	17–0–1	Albert Leo	TKO	1 (4)	May 1, 1931	Dreamland Auditorium, San Francisco, California, U.S.	
17	Win	16–0–1	Tommy Cox	KO	3 (4)	Apr 10, 1931	Dreamland Auditorium, San Francisco, California, U.S.	
16	Win	15–0–1	Leo Lomelli	PTS	4	Mar 3, 1931	Ryan's Auditorium, Fresno, California, U.S.	
15	Win	14–0–1	Nels Ferguson	PTS	4	Feb 20, 1931	Dreamland Auditorium, San Francisco, California, U.S.	
14	Win	13–0–1	Roy McDonald	PTS	4	Feb 3, 1931	Ryan's Auditorium, Fresno, California, U.S.	
13	Win	12–0–1	Lou Zimmerman	PTS	4	Jan 30, 1931	Dreamland Auditorium, San Francisco, California, U.S.	
12	Win	11–0–1	Johnny Freeman	PTS	4	Jan 16, 1931	Dreamland Auditorium, San Francisco, California, U.S.	
11	Win	10–0–1	Jimmy Hoag	KO	1 (4)	Dec 19, 1930	Dreamland Auditorium, San Francisco, California, U.S.	
10	Win	9–0–1	Benny Lawrence	PTS	4	Dec 12, 1930	Dreamland Auditorium, San Francisco, California, U.S.	
9	Win	8–0–1	Teddy King	TKO	4 (4)	Nov 18, 1930	Forman's Arena, San Jose, California, U.S.	
8	Win	7–0–1	Joe Felix	KO	1 (?)	Nov 5, 1930	Auditorium, Oakland, California, U.S.	
7	Win	6–0–1	Scotty McDougal	TKO	2 (4)	Oct 28, 1930	Forman's Arena, San Jose, California, U.S.	
6	Win	5–0–1	Louie Rogers	KO	2 (4)	Oct 21, 1930	Forman's Arena, San Jose, California, U.S.	
5	Win	4–0–1	Billy Delaney	PTS	4	Sep 24, 1930	National Hall, San Francisco, California, U.S.	
4	Win	3–0–1	Billy Mitchell	KO	3 (4)	Sep 3, 1930	National Hall, San Francisco, California, U.S.	
3	Win	2–0–1	Al Johnson	PTS	4	Aug 6, 1930	National Hall, San Francisco, California, U.S.	
2	Draw	1–0–1	Al Johnson	PTS	4	Jul 30, 1930	National Hall, San Francisco, California, U.S.	
1	Win	1–0	Johnny Dennis	TKO	4 (4)	Jul 4, 1930	Ewing Field, San Francisco, California, U.S.	

== See also ==
- List of male boxers
