= Jackie Burke (boxer) =

American boxer (1914–1978)

Personal information
- Nickname: Utah Assassin
- Born: Jacob Berkenpas; July 26, 1914 Ogden, Utah, U.S.
- Died: April 4, 1978 (aged 63)
- Height: 5 ft 7 in (170 cm)
- Weight: Welterweight; Middleweight

Boxing career
- Reach: 67 in (170 cm)

Boxing record
- Total fights: 212
- Wins: 145
- Win by KO: 68
- Losses: 40
- Draws: 26
- No contests: 1

Jackie Burke (born Jacob Berkenpas; July 26, 1914 – April 4, 1978) was an American professional boxer who competed from 1932 to 1949. He held the Intermountain and Utah State welterweight and middleweight titles at various points between 1933 and 1940, as well as the Southwestern, Pacific Northwest, and Pacific Southwest welterweight titles in 1935.

== Early life ==
Burke was born Jacob Berkenpas on July 26, 1914, in Ogden, Utah, to Dutch immigrants Harm Berkenpas and Antje Kap.

== Boxing career ==
After compiling a 1–2–2 record with one no contest in his first six bouts, Burke went unbeaten in his next 30, posting a 22–0–8 record before being outpointed by Al Gomez on June 29, 1934.

Burke faced Mark Jensen on September 7, 1935, earning a fourth-round knockout victory. On March 2, 1936, Burke faced future world middleweight champion Ceferino Garcia for the first of four times in his career, fighting him to a draw.

On June 27, 1937, Burke faced reigning world welterweight champion and three-division world champion Barney Ross in a non-title bout at Heinemann Park, losing by knockout in the fifth round.

By May 1938, Burke held the Intermountain welterweight and middleweight titles and had defeated virtually all claimants to the Western States championships in both divisions, including Tiger Ray Cote, the Montana, North Dakota, and South Dakota champion, and Billy Barnes, the California welterweight champion. On May 25, Burke faced former world welterweight champion Young Corbett III, losing by decision over ten rounds. On July 25, Burke faced Ceferino Garcia for the fourth and final time, suffering a second-round knockout loss after being floored three times.

On November 14, 1938, Burke was outpointed by Jack Rainwater, losing the Utah State welterweight title. The two met again two weeks later, with Burke flooring Rainwater for a nine-count in the seventh round en route to a decision victory to regain the title. By the end of the bout, Rainwater's right eye was completely closed, with cuts over his left eye and around his mouth, while Burke was cut around both eyes.

On January 20, 1939, Burke faced future world welterweight champion Fritzie Zivic. Although neither fighter was knocked down, both landed telling blows throughout the closely contested bout. The referee scored the fight 51–49 for Zivic, while one judge had it even and the other scored it 53–47 for Zivic, giving him the decision. The two met again on July 11, with Zivic earning a unanimous decision over ten rounds.

On July 31, 1940, Burke successfully defended his Intermountain welterweight title with a ten-round decision victory over Buddy McCrea.

On August 13, 1942, Burke faced another three-division world champion in Henry Armstrong. Armstrong was the aggressor throughout the bout, flooring Burke in the second round and twice in the eighth en route to a decision victory.

Burke retired from professional boxing in 1949 with a record of 145–40–26 with one no contest, including 68 victories by knockout.

== Professional boxing record ==
212 fights	145 wins	40 losses
By knockout	68	11
By decision	77	29
Draws	26	
No contests	1	

No.	Result	Record	Opponent	Type	Round, time	Date	Location	Notes
212	Loss	145–40–26 (1)	Harry Matthews	KO	4 (10)	Mar 18, 1949	Legion Stadium, Hollywood, California, U.S.	
211	Loss	145–39–26 (1)	Paul Perkins	UD	10	Mar 14, 1949	Fairgrounds Coliseum, Salt Lake City, Utah, U.S.	
210	Win	145–38–26 (1)	Frank Ronkovich	PTS	8	Mar 1, 1949	Fairgrounds Coliseum, Salt Lake City, Utah, U.S.	
209	Win	144–38–26 (1)	Tommy Fair	TKO	5 (8)	Jan 31, 1949	Fairgrounds Coliseum, Salt Lake City, Utah, U.S.	
208	Win	143–38–26 (1)	Willie Parker	PTS	10	Dec 14, 1948	Livestock Show Coliseum, Ogden, Utah, U.S.	
207	Win	142–38–26 (1)	Lonnie Stewart	KO	1 (6)	Dec 6, 1948	Fairgrounds Coliseum, Salt Lake City, Utah, U.S.	
206	Win	141–38–26 (1)	Smuggy Hursey	PTS	10	Nov 1, 1948	Fairgrounds Coliseum, Salt Lake City, Utah, U.S.	
205	Win	140–38–26 (1)	Ron Whittle	TKO	6 (10)	Oct 11, 1948	Fairgrounds Coliseum, Salt Lake City, Utah, U.S.	
204	Win	139–38–26 (1)	Jack Marshall	TKO	4 (6)	Sep 6, 1948	Fairgrounds Coliseum, Salt Lake City, Utah, U.S.	
203	Win	138–38–26 (1)	Paul Perkins	PTS	10	Jun 30, 1948	John Affleck Park, Ogden, Utah, U.S.	
202	Loss	137–38–26 (1)	Harry Matthews	UD	10	Jun 8, 1948	Derks Field, Salt Lake City, Utah, U.S.	
201	Win	137–37–26 (1)	Spider McCallum	PTS	10	May 28, 1948	Fort Missoula National Guard Gym, Missoula, Montana, U.S.	
200	Loss	136–37–26 (1)	Paul Perkins	PTS	10	Sep 15, 1947	Fairgrounds Coliseum, Salt Lake City, Utah, U.S.	For Intermountain middleweight title
199	Win	136–36–26 (1)	Chuck Caldwell	PTS	10	Aug 11, 1947	John Affleck Park, Ogden, Utah, U.S.	
198	Draw	135–36–26 (1)	Remo Polidori	PTS	10	Jun 25, 1947	Ogden High School Gym, Ogden, Utah, U.S.	
197	Win	135–36–25 (1)	Benny Flake	PTS	10	May 27, 1947	Fairgrounds Coliseum, Salt Lake City, Utah, U.S.	
196	Win	134–36–25 (1)	Remo Polidori	UD	10	May 12, 1947	Fairgrounds Coliseum, Salt Lake City, Utah, U.S.	
195	Win	133–36–25 (1)	Al Romero	KO	5 (10)	May 5, 1947	Fairgrounds Coliseum, Ogden, Utah, U.S.	
194	Win	132–36–25 (1)	Tommy Fair	KO	4 (10)	Apr 15, 1947	Fairgrounds Coliseum, Ogden, Utah, U.S.	
193	Win	131–36–25 (1)	Eddie Halligan	UD	10	Mar 1, 1947	Boise High School Gymnasium, Boise, Idaho, U.S.	
192	Draw	130–36–25 (1)	Remo Polidori	PTS	10	Dec 9, 1946	Fairgrounds Coliseum, Salt Lake City, Utah, U.S.	
191	Win	130–36–24 (1)	Don Lee	PTS	10	Aug 6, 1946	Fairgrounds Coliseum, Salt Lake City, Utah, U.S.	
190	Loss	129–36–24 (1)	Billy Tierney	PTS	10	Jul 30, 1946	Civic Ice Arena, Seattle, Washington, U.S.	
189	Win	129–35–24 (1)	Bobcat Lee	PTS	10	Jul 16, 1946	John Affleck Park, Ogden, Utah, U.S.	
188	Win	128–35–24 (1)	Al Romero	KO	3 (10)	Apr 20, 1946	Pocatello, Idaho, U.S.	
187	Win	127–35–24 (1)	Chief Crazy Horse	KO	7 (10)	Apr 15, 1946	Fairgrounds Coliseum, Salt Lake City, Utah, U.S.	
186	Win	126–35–24 (1)	Danny (Kid) Obregon	KO	9 (10)	Apr 8, 1946	Weber State College Gymnasium, Ogden, Utah, U.S.	
185	Win	125–35–24 (1)	Danny (Kid) Obregon	PTS	10	Apr 1, 1946	Fairgrounds Coliseum, Salt Lake City, Utah, U.S.	
184	Win	124–35–24 (1)	Al Romero	KO	3 (10)	Mar 11, 1946	Mapleway Arena, Salt Lake City, Utah, U.S.	
183	Win	123–35–24 (1)	Jimmy McAdams	TKO	3 (8)	Feb 18, 1946	Fairgrounds Coliseum, Salt Lake City, Utah, U.S.	
182	Win	122–35–24 (1)	Bill Cunningham	PTS	6	Jan 28, 1946	Fairgrounds Coliseum, Salt Lake City, Utah, U.S.	
181	Win	121–35–24 (1)	Pete Viratos	PTS	10	Jan 20, 1944	Ogden High School Gym, Ogden, Utah, U.S.	
180	Draw	120–35–24 (1)	Gene Johnson	PTS	15	Nov 9, 1943	Ogden High School Gym, Ogden, Utah, U.S.	
179	Win	120–35–23 (1)	Speedy Cannon	PTS	10	Aug 28, 1943	Pocatello, Idaho, U.S.	
178	Win	119–35–23 (1)	Eddie Williams	PTS	10	Aug 24, 1943	John Affleck Park, Ogden, Utah, U.S.	
177	Win	118–35–23 (1)	Harry Wright	KO	3 (10)	Jun 19, 1943	Ogden Stadium, Ogden, Utah, U.S.	
176	Loss	117–35–23 (1)	Jimmy Garrison	TKO	4 (10)	Apr 9, 1943	Auditorium, Portland, Oregon, U.S.	
175	Loss	117–34–23 (1)	Earl Turner	TKO	5 (10)	Nov 18, 1942	Auditorium, Oakland, California, U.S.	
174	Win	117–33–23 (1)	Eddie Simmons	TKO	5 (10)	Nov 10, 1942	Ogden High School Gym, Ogden, Utah, U.S.	
173	Win	116–33–23 (1)	Tony Mann	KO	?	Sep 7, 1942	Legion Arena, Las Vegas, Nevada, U.S.	
172	Loss	115–33–23 (1)	Henry Armstrong	PTS	10	Aug 13, 1942	John Affleck Park, Ogden, Utah, U.S.	
171	Loss	115–32–23 (1)	Pedro Ortega	PTS	10	Jul 3, 1942	Las Vegas, Nevada, U.S.	
170	Win	115–31–23 (1)	Johnny Candia	TKO	4 (?)	Jun 18, 1942	Hill Air Force Base, Utah, U.S.	
169	Win	114–31–23 (1)	Pedro Ortega	PTS	10	Jun 15, 1942	Ogden Stadium, Ogden, Utah, U.S.	
168	Win	113–31–23 (1)	Pedro Ortega	PTS	10	May 27, 1942	Legion Arena, Las Vegas, Nevada, U.S.	
167	Loss	112–31–23 (1)	Charley Burley	TKO	5 (10)	Jan 23, 1942	Armory, Minneapolis, Minnesota, U.S.	
166	Loss	112–30–23 (1)	RJ Lewis	PTS	12	Jun 16, 1941	Fairview Avenue Outdoor Arena, Boise, Idaho, U.S.	For Intermountain middleweight title
165	Win	112–29–23 (1)	Bobby McIntire	PTS	10	Nov 25, 1940	Fox Theater, Butte, Montana, U.S.	
164	Win	111–29–23 (1)	Bill Mason	KO	1 (10)	Oct 15, 1940	Ogden High School Gym, Ogden, Utah, U.S.	
163	Draw	110–29–23 (1)	Tony Chavez	PTS	10	Sep 17, 1940	Fox Theater, Butte, Montana, U.S.	
162	Win	110–29–22 (1)	Jimmy Casino	KO	2 (10)	Aug 12, 1940	Highland Park, Idaho Falls, Idaho, U.S.	
161	Loss	109–29–22 (1)	Johnny Marquez	PTS	10	Aug 9, 1940	Athletic Park, Billings, Montana, U.S.	
160	Win	109–28–22 (1)	Buddy McCrea	PTS	10	Jul 31, 1940	Monte Vista, Colorado, U.S.	Retained Intermountain welterweight title
159	Win	108–28–22 (1)	RJ Lewis	PTS	10	Jul 25, 1940	Delta, Utah, U.S.	
158	Win	107–28–22 (1)	Jimmy Best	PTS	8	Jul 19, 1940	Butte High Stadium, Butte, Montana, U.S.	
157	Win	106–28–22 (1)	Ivan Red Bland	TKO	7 (10)	Jul 8, 1940	South State Street Arena, Salt Lake City, Utah, U.S.	Retained USA Utah State middleweight title
156	Win	105–28–22 (1)	Tiger Ray Cote	RTD	8 (10)	Jun 25, 1940	Fox Theater, Butte, Montana, U.S.	
155	Win	104–28–22 (1)	Jack Carson	PTS	10	May 16, 1940	Craig, Colorado, U.S.	
154	Draw	103–28–22 (1)	Billy Bengal	PTS	10	May 6, 1940	McCullough's Arena, Salt Lake City, Utah, U.S.	
153	Win	103–28–21 (1)	Billy Pryor	PTS	10	Apr 22, 1940	McCullough's Arena, Salt Lake City, Utah, U.S.	
152	Win	102–28–21 (1)	Pete Giacoma	PTS	10	Apr 1, 1940	McCullough's Arena, Salt Lake City, Utah, U.S.	Retained USA Utah State welterweight title
151	Win	101–28–21 (1)	OT Wright	KO	7 (10)	Mar 25, 1940	McCullough's Arena, Salt Lake City, Utah, U.S.	
150	Win	100–28–21 (1)	Babe Marino	PTS	10	Mar 11, 1940	McCullough's Arena, Salt Lake City, Utah, U.S.	
149	Loss	99–28–21 (1)	Izzy Jannazzo	UD	10	Feb 7, 1940	Watres Armory, Scranton, Pennsylvania, U.S.	
148	Win	99–27–21 (1)	Harry Matthews	PTS	10	Jan 1, 1940	Pocatello, Idaho, U.S.	
147	Win	98–27–21 (1)	RJ Lewis	TKO	7 (10)	Dec 11, 1939	McCullough's Arena, Salt Lake City, Utah, U.S.	
146	Win	97–27–21 (1)	Bud Jensen	TKO	6 (10)	Dec 1, 1939	High School Gym, Pocatello, Idaho, U.S.	
145	Win	96–27–21 (1)	Sonny Lee	KO	9 (10)	Nov 14, 1939	Park Ro-She, Provo, Utah, U.S.	
144	Win	95–27–21 (1)	Sidney Brent	TKO	2 (6)	Nov 6, 1939	Salt Lake City, Utah, U.S.	
143	Loss	94–27–21 (1)	California Jackie Wilson	TKO	7 (10)	Oct 17, 1939	Olympic Auditorium, Los Angeles, California, U.S.	
142	Win	94–26–21 (1)	Tiger Ray Cote	PTS	10	Oct 9, 1939	McCullough's Arena, Salt Lake City, Utah, U.S.	Retained USA Utah State middleweight title
141	Win	93–26–21 (1)	Billy Pryor	PTS	10	Jul 17, 1939	White Park, Salt Lake City, Utah, U.S.	
140	Loss	92–26–21 (1)	Fritzie Zivic	UD	10	Jul 11, 1939	Municipal Auditorium, Saint Louis, Missouri, U.S.	
139	Win	92–25–21 (1)	Red Lund	TKO	2 (10)	Jun 7, 1939	Ogden High School Gym, Ogden, Utah, U.S.	
138	Draw	91–25–21 (1)	Arlington Spilsbury	PTS	10	Apr 17, 1939	McCullough's Arena, Salt Lake City, Utah, U.S.	
137	Loss	91–25–20 (1)	Holman Williams	PTS	10	Mar 21, 1939	Watres Armory, Scranton, Pennsylvania, U.S.	
136	Loss	91–24–20 (1)	Tiger Kid Walker	TKO	2 (10)	Mar 2, 1939	Coliseum, Saint Louis, Missouri, U.S.	
135	Win	91–23–20 (1)	Max Young	TKO	2 (6)	Feb 14, 1939	Park Ro-She, Provo, Utah, U.S.	
134	Win	90–23–20 (1)	GeGe Gravante	KO	5 (10)	Feb 6, 1939	McCullough's Arena, Salt Lake City, Utah, U.S.	
133	Loss	89–23–20 (1)	Fritzie Zivic	MD	10	Jan 20, 1939	Coliseum, Saint Louis, Missouri, U.S.	
132	Draw	89–22–20 (1)	Windmill Pearce	PTS	8	Dec 20, 1938	Park Ro-She, Provo, Utah, U.S.	Retained Intermountain welterweight title and USA Utah State welterweight and middleweight titles; For Intermountain middleweight title
131	Win	89–22–19 (1)	Hoot Johnson	KO	3 (8)	Dec 13, 1938	Park Ro-She, Provo, Utah, U.S.	Retained USA Utah State welterweight title
130	Loss	88–22–19 (1)	Johnny Barbara	SD	10	Dec 8, 1938	White City Arena, Chicago, Illinois, U.S.	
129	Win	88–21–19 (1)	Jack Rainwater	PTS	10	Nov 28, 1938	McCullough's Arena, Salt Lake City, Utah, U.S.	Won USA Utah State welterweight title
128	Loss	87–21–19 (1)	Milt Aron	MD	10	Nov 21, 1938	Marigold Gardens, Chicago, Illinois, U.S.	
127	Loss	87–20–19 (1)	Jack Rainwater	PTS	10	Nov 14, 1938	McCullough's Arena, Salt Lake City, Utah, U.S.	Lost USA Utah State welterweight title
126	Win	87–19–19 (1)	Doll Nelson	PTS	10	Oct 28, 1938	Denver, Colorado, U.S.	
125	Win	86–19–19 (1)	Cannonball Martin	KO	4 (10)	Oct 3, 1938	McCullough's Arena, Salt Lake City, Utah, U.S.	
124	Win	85–19–19 (1)	Speedy Wallace	PTS	10	Sep 26, 1938	McCullough's Arena, Salt Lake City, Utah, U.S.	Won USA Utah State welterweight title
123	Loss	84–19–19 (1)	Milt Aron	SD	10	Sep 12, 1938	Marigold Gardens Outdoor Arena, Chicago, Illinois, U.S.	
122	Draw	84–18–19 (1)	Sonny Jones	PTS	10	Aug 17, 1938	Denman Auditorium, Vancouver, British Columbia, Canada	
121	Loss	84–18–18 (1)	Ceferino Garcia	TKO	2 (15)	Jul 25, 1938	Ogden Stadium, Ogden, Utah, U.S.	
120	Win	84–17–18 (1)	Carl O'Gara	PTS	6	Jul 8, 1938	Nephi, Utah, U.S.	Won USA Utah State middleweight title
119	Loss	83–17–18 (1)	Ceferino Garcia	KO	4 (10)	Jul 4, 1938	Stockton, California, U.S.	
118	Loss	83–16–18 (1)	Young Corbett III	PTS	10	May 25, 1938	McCullough's Arena, Salt Lake City, Utah, U.S.	
117	Win	83–15–18 (1)	Hoyt Jones	TKO	3 (10)	May 13, 1938	Gilmore Stadium, Los Angeles, California, U.S.	
116	Win	82–15–18 (1)	Eddie Morgan	KO	2 (10)	Apr 28, 1938	Chateau, Ogden, Utah, U.S.	
115	Win	81–15–18 (1)	Ivan Red Bland	PTS	10	Apr 25, 1938	McCullough's Arena, Salt Lake City, Utah, U.S.	
114	Win	80–15–18 (1)	Billy Pascal	PTS	8	Apr 4, 1938	McCullough's Arena, Salt Lake City, Utah, U.S.	
113	Loss	79–15–18 (1)	Freddie Dixon	PTS	10	Mar 18, 1938	Legion Arena, Phoenix, Arizona, U.S.	
112	Win	79–14–18 (1)	Chief Vidal Ballard	PTS	10	Mar 14, 1938	McCullough's Arena, Salt Lake City, Utah, U.S.	
111	Win	78–14–18 (1)	Billy Barnes	PTS	8	Feb 28, 1938	McCullough's Arena, Salt Lake City, Utah, U.S.	Retained Intermountain welterweight title
110	Loss	77–14–18 (1)	Freddie Dixon	PTS	10	Feb 25, 1938	Legion Arena, Phoenix, Arizona, U.S.	
109	Win	77–13–18 (1)	Tiger Ray Cote	PTS	8	Feb 14, 1938	McCullough's Arena, Salt Lake City, Utah, U.S.	Retained Intermountain welterweight title
108	Win	76–13–18 (1)	Red Lund	KO	4 (8)	Jan 27, 1938	Brigham City, Utah, U.S.	
107	Win	75–13–18 (1)	Billy Dell	KO	4 (?)	Dec 17, 1937	Price, Utah, U.S.	
106	Win	74–13–18 (1)	Young Peter Jackson	PTS	10	Dec 10, 1937	Chateau, Ogden, Utah, U.S.	
105	Win	73–13–18 (1)	Herb Norton	TKO	6 (10)	Dec 6, 1937	McCullough's Arena, Salt Lake City, Utah, U.S.	
104	Win	72–13–18 (1)	Dick Newton	KO	1 (6)	Oct 28, 1937	Chateau, Ogden, Utah, U.S.	
103	Win	71–13–18 (1)	Luke Wallace	KO	3 (10)	Oct 25, 1937	McCullough's Arena, Salt Lake City, Utah, U.S.	
102	Win	70–13–18 (1)	Buster (Kid) Cannon	KO	4 (8)	Oct 18, 1937	McCullough's Arena, Salt Lake City, Utah, U.S.	
101	Win	69–13–18 (1)	Tony Bond	KO	1 (6)	Oct 14, 1937	White City, Utah, U.S.	
100	Draw	68–13–18 (1)	Eddie Booker	PTS	10	Oct 8, 1937	Dreamland Auditorium, San Francisco, California, U.S.	
99	Win	68–13–17 (1)	Johnny O'Brien	KO	2 (4)	Sep 22, 1937	Brown Palace, Ogden, Utah, U.S.	
98	Win	67–13–17 (1)	Red Lund	TKO	3 (6)	Sep 15, 1937	Brown Palace, Ogden, Utah, U.S.	
97	Win	66–13–17 (1)	Stan Birrell	TKO	6 (10)	Sep 10, 1937	Brigham City, Utah, U.S.	
96	Loss	65–13–17 (1)	Barney Ross	KO	5 (10)	Jun 27, 1937	Heinemann Park, New Orleans, Louisiana, U.S.	
95	Win	65–12–17 (1)	Joey Spangler	SD	10	Jun 21, 1937	Wheeling, West Virginia, U.S.	
94	Win	64–12–17 (1)	Jess McMurtry	KO	4 (10)	Jun 4, 1937	Coliseum Arena, New Orleans, Louisiana, U.S.	
93	Win	63–12–17 (1)	Sammy Chivas	NWS	10	May 24, 1937	Convention Hall, Toledo, Ohio, U.S.	
92	Win	62–12–17 (1)	Tracy Cox	PTS	8	May 10, 1937	Coliseum Arena, New Orleans, Louisiana, U.S.	
91	Draw	61–12–17 (1)	Sammy Chivas	PTS	8	Apr 28, 1937	Naval Armory, Detroit, Michigan, U.S.	
90	Win	61–12–16 (1)	Eddie Morgan	TKO	5 (6)	Apr 23, 1937	Public Hall, Cleveland, Ohio, U.S.	
89	Win	60–12–16 (1)	Willard Brown	PTS	8	Apr 5, 1937	Coliseum Arena, New Orleans, Louisiana, U.S.	
88	Loss	59–12–16 (1)	George Salvadore	KO	6 (10)	Jan 26, 1937	Olympiad Arena, Houston, Texas, U.S.	
87	Win	59–11–16 (1)	Lew Raymond	PTS	10	Jan 18, 1937	Turner's Arena, Washington, D.C., U.S.	
86	Win	58–11–16 (1)	Max Young	RTD	6 (10)	Dec 28, 1936	Park Ro-She, Provo, Utah, U.S.	Won Intermountain welterweight title
85	Win	57–11–16 (1)	Young Harvey	PTS	6	Dec 17, 1936	Gem Theatre, Rigby, Idaho, U.S.	
84	Loss	56–11–16 (1)	Sammy Brown	PTS	10	Dec 11, 1936	Fairgrounds Arena, Boise, Idaho, U.S.	
83	Win	56–10–16 (1)	Billy Azevedo	PTS	10	Nov 16, 1936	Elks Club, Ogden, Utah, U.S.	
82	Draw	55–10–16 (1)	Al Manfredo	PTS	10	Nov 2, 1936	McCullough's Arena, Salt Lake City, Utah, U.S.	
81	Loss	55–10–15 (1)	Jack Barger	UD	10	Oct 21, 1936	Preston, Idaho, U.S.	For Western middleweight title
80	Loss	55–9–15 (1)	Jack Chase	PTS	10	Sep 15, 1936	St. Mary's Auditorium, Walsenburg, Colorado, U.S.	Lost Intermountain welterweight and middleweight titles
79	Win	55–8–15 (1)	Walter Still	PTS	8	Sep 12, 1936	Bluebird Arena, Brigham City, Utah, U.S.	
78	Win	54–8–15 (1)	Jack Barger	PTS	10	Sep 1, 1936	Logan, Utah, U.S.	
77	Win	53–8–15 (1)	Sammy O'Dell	KO	5 (10)	Aug 7, 1936	Cedar City, Utah, U.S.	
76	Loss	52–8–15 (1)	Glen Lee	PTS	10	Jul 10, 1936	Legion Stadium, Hollywood, California, U.S.	
75	Draw	52–7–15 (1)	Arlington Spilsbury	PTS	10	Jul 4, 1936	Cedar City, Utah, U.S.	Retained Intermountain welterweight title
74	Win	52–7–14 (1)	Joey Medill	KO	3 (10)	Jun 30, 1936	Ogden Stadium, Ogden, Utah, U.S.	
73	Win	51–7–14 (1)	Jack Brent	PTS	6	Jun 15, 1936	McCullough's Arena, Salt Lake City, Utah, U.S.	
72	Loss	50–7–14 (1)	Ceferino Garcia	TKO	8 (10)	May 8, 1936	Legion Stadium, Hollywood, California, U.S.	
71	Win	50–6–14 (1)	Kayo Borrell	PTS	4	Apr 15, 1936	Utah Copper Club, Magna, Utah, U.S.	
70	Win	49–6–14 (1)	Alvin Lewis	PTS	10	Apr 6, 1936	Elks Club, Ogden, Utah, U.S.	
69	Draw	48–6–14 (1)	Ceferino Garcia	PTS	10	Mar 2, 1936	Orpheum Theatre, Ogden, Utah, U.S.	
68	Win	48–6–13 (1)	Emil Cody	PTS	10	Feb 10, 1936	Elks Club, Ogden, Utah, U.S.	
67	Win	47–6–13 (1)	Dee Johnson	PTS	10	Jan 13, 1936	Park Ro-She, Provo, Utah, U.S.	Retained Intermountain welterweight title
66	Draw	46–6–13 (1)	Eddie Frisco	PTS	10	Dec 5, 1935	White City Park, Boise, Idaho, U.S.	
65	Win	46–6–12 (1)	Joey Brown	TKO	5 (10)	Nov 19, 1935	Orpheum Theatre, Ogden, Utah, U.S.	
64	Win	45–6–12 (1)	Grant Tribe	KO	4 (10)	Nov 7, 1935	Kemmerer, Wyoming, U.S.	
63	Win	44–6–12 (1)	Tommy Corbett	KO	3 (10)	Oct 19, 1935	Ely, Nevada, U.S.	
62	Win	43–6–12 (1)	Mike Montoya	PTS	10	Oct 8, 1935	Legion Hall, Twin Falls, Idaho, U.S.	
61	Win	42–6–12 (1)	Mike Montoya	PTS	10	Sep 12, 1935	Elks Club, Boise, Idaho, U.S.	
60	Win	41–6–12 (1)	Mark Jensen	TKO	4 (8)	Sep 7, 1935	Brigham City, Utah, U.S.	
59	Loss	40–6–12 (1)	Joe Maero	UD	10	Aug 31, 1935	Elko, Nevada, U.S.	
58	Win	40–5–12 (1)	Truman Harvey	UD	10	Aug 26, 1935	Ogden Stadium, Ogden, Utah, U.S.	Retained Intermountain middleweight title
57	Win	39–5–12 (1)	Indian Johnny Smith	UD	10	Jul 23, 1935	Paramount Theatre, Ogden, Utah, U.S.	Won Pacific Southwest welterweight title
56	Win	38–5–12 (1)	Tommy Corbett	PTS	10	Jul 11, 1935	Elks Club, Boise, Idaho, U.S.	
55	Win	37–5–12 (1)	Cowboy Eddie Anderson	PTS	10	Jul 8, 1935	Ogden Stadium, Ogden, Utah, U.S.	
54	Win	36–5–12 (1)	Max Young	KO	5 (10)	Jul 3, 1935	Park Ro-She, Provo, Utah, U.S.	Won Intermountain welterweight title
53	Win	35–5–12 (1)	Frankie Monroe	UD	10	May 23, 1935	Armory, Boise, Idaho, U.S.	Won Pacific Northwest welterweight title
52	Draw	34–5–12 (1)	Tony Roccaforte	PTS	10	May 17, 1935	Orpheum Theatre, Ogden, Utah, U.S.	
51	Win	34–5–11 (1)	Hershie Wilson	UD	10	May 3, 1935	Orpheum Theatre, Ogden, Utah, U.S.	
50	Win	33–5–11 (1)	Kermit Thompson	TKO	5 (10)	Apr 12, 1935	Chestnut St. Arena, Reno, Nevada, U.S.	
49	Win	32–5–11 (1)	Jack Barger	UD	10	Feb 8, 1935	Orpheum Theatre, Ogden, Utah, U.S.	Won Intermountain middleweight title
48	Win	31–5–11 (1)	Jerry Robertson	TKO	3 (10)	Jan 8, 1935	Elks Club, Ogden, Utah, U.S.	Won Southwestern welterweight title
47	Win	30–5–11 (1)	Buster (Kid) Cannon	PTS	10	Dec 18, 1934	Legion Hall, Twin Falls, Idaho, U.S.	
46	Draw	29–5–11 (1)	Arlington Spilsbury	PTS	? (?)	Dec 1, 1934	Kanab, Utah, U.S.	
45	Win	29–5–10 (1)	Joe Martinez	PTS	10	Nov 12, 1934	Elks Club, Ogden, Utah, U.S.	
44	Win	28–5–10 (1)	Joe Martinez	PTS	10	Nov 2, 1934	Pocatello, Idaho, U.S.	
43	Win	27–5–10 (1)	Sailor Jack Nealy	PTS	8	Sep 6, 1934	Magic City, Twin Falls, Idaho, U.S.	
42	Loss	26–5–10 (1)	Joe Martinez	PTS	10	Aug 17, 1934	Ogden Stadium, Ogden, Utah, U.S.	Lost Intermountain welterweight title
41	Win	26–4–10 (1)	Joe Martinez	UD	10	Aug 6, 1934	Ogden Stadium, Ogden, Utah, U.S.	
40	Win	25–4–10 (1)	Ennis Terry	TKO	8 (10)	Jul 27, 1934	McCullough's Arena, Salt Lake City, Utah, U.S.	Retained Intermountain welterweight title; Won USA Utah State welterweight title
39	Win	24–4–10 (1)	Augustine Perez	RTD	5 (10)	Jul 16, 1934	Ogden Stadium, Ogden, Utah, U.S.	Retained Intermountain welterweight title
38	Loss	23–4–10 (1)	Arlington Spilsbury	PTS	8	Jul 4, 1934	Cedar City, Utah, U.S.	
37	Loss	23–3–10 (1)	Al Gomez	PTS	6	Jun 29, 1934	Chestnut St. Arena, Reno, Nevada, U.S.	
36	Win	23–2–10 (1)	Red Warren	KO	1 (6)	Jun 26, 1934	Ogden Stadium, Ogden, Utah, U.S.	
35	Win	22–2–10 (1)	Tony Roccaforte	PTS	4	Apr 27, 1934	Chestnut St. Arena, Reno, Nevada, U.S.	
34	Draw	21–2–10 (1)	Buster (Kid) Cannon	MD	10	Mar 23, 1934	Auditorium Theater, Pocatello, Idaho, U.S.	
33	Win	21–2–9 (1)	Clair Tollestrup	KO	9 (10)	Feb 19, 1934	Weber State College Gymnasium, Ogden, Utah, U.S.	
32	Win	20–2–9 (1)	Mark Jensen	PTS	10	Jan 9, 1934	Weber State College Gymnasium, Ogden, Utah, U.S.	
31	Draw	19–2–9 (1)	Buster (Kid) Cannon	PTS	8	Dec 14, 1933	Twin Falls, Idaho, U.S.	
30	Draw	19–2–8 (1)	Sammy George	PTS	6	Nov 13, 1933	McCullough's Arena, Salt Lake City, Utah, U.S.	Retained Intermountain welterweight title; For USA Utah State welterweight title
29	Draw	19–2–7 (1)	Buster (Kid) Cannon	PTS	8	Nov 9, 1933	Legion Club, Twin Falls, Idaho, U.S.	
28	Draw	19–2–6 (1)	Sammy George	PTS	6	Oct 18, 1933	Paramount Theatre, Ogden, Utah, U.S.	
27	Win	19–2–5 (1)	Phil Greening	KO	3 (10)	Oct 16, 1933	Armory Arena, Salt Lake City, Utah, U.S.	Retained Intermountain welterweight title
26	Win	18–2–5 (1)	Sammy George	PTS	6	Oct 2, 1933	McCullough's Arena, Salt Lake City, Utah, U.S.	Won Intermountain welterweight title
25	Win	17–2–5 (1)	Joe Domingo	KO	2 (8)	Sep 28, 1933	Twin Falls, Idaho, U.S.	
24	Win	16–2–5 (1)	Red Warren	TKO	3 (6)	Sep 13, 1933	Paramount Theatre, Ogden, Utah, U.S.	
23	Win	15–2–5 (1)	Ennis Terry	PTS	6	Sep 11, 1933	Hippodrome Theater, Salt Lake City, Utah, U.S.	
22	Win	14–2–5 (1)	Mog Warren	KO	4 (6)	Sep 8, 1933	McCullough's Arena, Salt Lake City, Utah, U.S.	
21	Win	13–2–5 (1)	Walker Miller	TKO	4 (6)	Aug 31, 1933	Legion Club, Twin Falls, Idaho, U.S.	
20	Win	12–2–5 (1)	Walker Miller	TKO	5 (6)	Aug 24, 1933	Paramount Theatre, Ogden, Utah, U.S.	
19	Win	11–2–5 (1)	Walter Muniz	PTS	4	Aug 4, 1933	Southside Arena, Reno, Nevada, U.S.	
18	Win	10–2–5 (1)	Andy Herzog	KO	2 (6)	Jul 21, 1933	Southside Arena, Reno, Nevada, U.S.	
17	Win	9–2–5 (1)	John Forente	KO	2 (?)	Jul 14, 1933	Southside Arena, Reno, Nevada, U.S.	
16	Draw	8–2–5 (1)	Sammy George	PTS	6	Jun 26, 1933	Ogden Stadium, Ogden, Utah, U.S.	
15	Draw	8–2–4 (1)	Mark Jensen	PTS	6	Jun 2, 1933	Ogden A.C., Ogden, Utah, U.S.	
14	Win	8–2–3 (1)	Walker Miller	PTS	6	May 19, 1933	Ogden A.C., Ogden, Utah, U.S.	
13	Win	7–2–3 (1)	Con Kelly	PTS	6	May 15, 1933	Hippodrome Theater, Salt Lake City, Utah, U.S.	
12	Win	6–2–3 (1)	Jess Winters	PTS	6	May 5, 1933	Ogden A.C., Ogden, Utah, U.S.	
11	Win	5–2–3 (1)	Alex Kress	TKO	3 (6)	Apr 21, 1933	Ogden A.C., Ogden, Utah, U.S.	
10	Win	4–2–3 (1)	Jimmy Lee	KO	3 (6)	Apr 14, 1933	Ogden A.C., Ogden, Utah, U.S.	
9	Win	3–2–3 (1)	Bill Haymond	PTS	4	Mar 20, 1933	Hippodrome Theater, Salt Lake City, Utah, U.S.	
8	Win	2–2–3 (1)	Jack Dix	TKO	4 (6)	Mar 17, 1933	Ogden A.C., Ogden, Utah, U.S.	
7	Draw	1–2–3 (1)	Jack Nash	PTS	6	Feb 23, 1933	Ogden A.C., Ogden, Utah, U.S.	
6	Loss	1–2–2 (1)	Joe Humphreys	PTS	4	Feb 13, 1933	Salt Lake City, Utah, U.S.	
5	Win	1–1–2 (1)	Bill Haymond	KO	6	Feb 9, 1933	Ogden A.C., Ogden, Utah, U.S.	
4	Draw	0–1–2 (1)	Eddie Doyle	PTS	4	Jan 10, 1933	Ogden A.C., Ogden, Utah, U.S.	
3	NC	0–1–1 (1)	Battling Marco	NC	4	Oct 17, 1932	Ogden A.C., Ogden, Utah, U.S.	
2	Loss	0–1–1	Eddie Doyle	PTS	4	Sep 16, 1932	Ogden Stadium, Ogden, Utah, U.S.	
1	Draw	0–0–1	John Smith	PTS	4	Jan 12, 1932	Revell's Arena, Ogden, Utah, U.S.	

== See also ==
- List of male boxers
