= Madame Bey =

American operator of a boxing camp

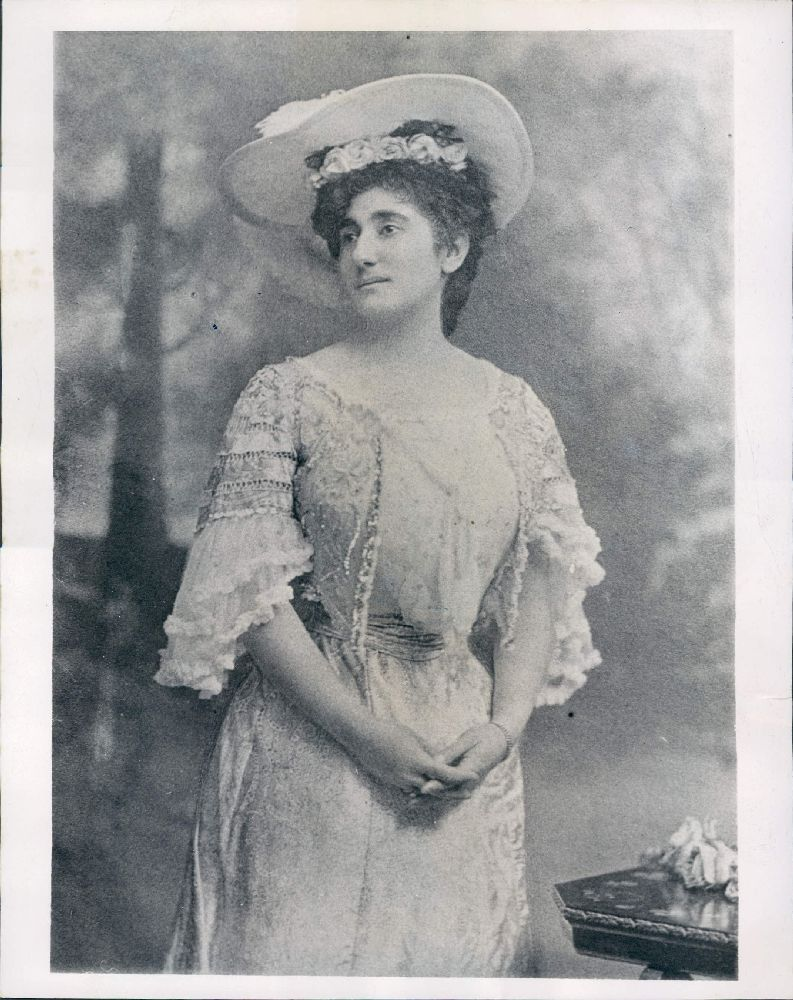
Madame Bey in DC

Hranoush Sidky Bey (February 25, 1881 – January 30, 1942), better known as Madame Bey, also Hranuş Sıdki Hanım, was an American boxing trainer. She ran a boxing camp for world champion boxers in Chatham Township, New Jersey, in the United States. Her life and boxing camp are documented in the book Madame Bey's: Home to Boxing Legends. Her prominence during the time she operated her boxing camp from 1923 to 1942 is documented in the thousands of press photos taken at her camp. Forgotten today, her camp's namesake was an everyday occurrence in sports sections of newspapers.

Madame Bey was born Hranoush Agaganian (Armenian: Հրանուշ Աղախանյան), in Constantinople (now Istanbul), Ottoman Empire. Her parents were Armenian and French. She attended American College, a.k.a. Constantinople College for Girls (now a part of Robert College), in Constantinople. Her family opposed her marriage to the Turkish Muslim Sidki Bey, who joined the Ottoman Ministry of Foreign Affairs and took a posting in Washington and later in New York. Her husband resigned from his position when the Ottoman government asked him to go to Berlin and the two remained stateside.

She was educated, a mother, a mezzo-soprano opera singer, wife of a Turkish diplomat, and personified sophistication during her years in Washington, D. C. President William McKinley and his wife considered her a friend and she was a few feet away when McKinley was assassinated. When renowned journalist Damon Runyon visited the camp to watch Max Schmeling, Runyon wrote, "With Max Schmeling and his training we have no concern here. Our concern is with Madame Bey, the lady who runs the place known as Madame Bey's, a famous training camp for prize fighters." She created a home for her boxing clientele in which they could train for their sport. The boxers who stayed at her boxing camp, followed her rules that she expected her boarders to obey. There was no alcohol; up by six; breakfast at seven; supper at five; lights out at ten; no swearing; and no women. She was strict in running her business but had personal, matriarchal relationships with her boxers. She called them her boys. She spoke seven languages – English, Armenian, French, German, Greek, Italian, and Spanish. She ran a successful Oriental rug business with her husband after they left the diplomatic corps, but her boxing endeavor she coveted the most.

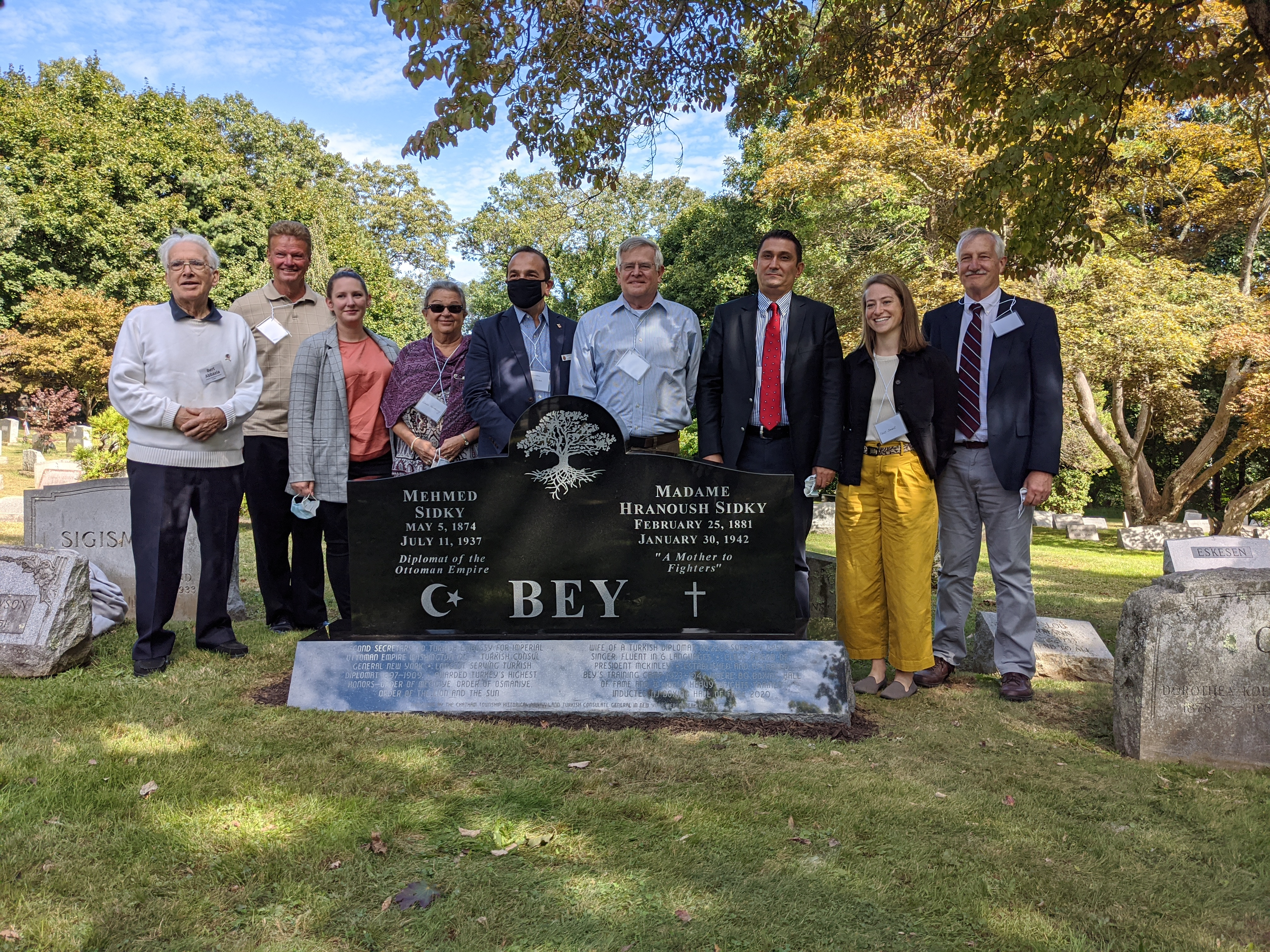
Dedication of Headstone for Sidky and Madame Hranoush Bey (Fairmount Cemetery, Chatham, New Jersey)

Among her favorite fighters were Max Schmeling, Freddie Steele, Tommy Farr, Paul Berlenbach, Primo Carnera, Lou Ambers, and Gene Tunney, whom she called her "polished emerald." According to Madame Bey's: Home to Boxing Legends, the following is an alphabetic list of people associated with boxing that were in Chatham Township, New Jersey, where Madame Bey's camp resided. Georgie Abrams, Lou Ambers, Fred Apostoli, Red Applegate, Ray Arcel, Freddie Archer, Henry Armstrong, Buddy Baer, Max Baer, Joe Baksi, Sam Baroudi, Billy Beauhuld, Tommy Bell, Steve Belloise, Paul Berlenbach, Melio Bettina, Carmine Bilotti, Whitey Bimstein, Jimmy Bivins, James Braddock, Jorge Brescia, Jack Britton, Freddy Brown, Al Buck, Red Burman, Mushy Callahan, Victor Campolo, Tony Canzoneri, Primo Carnera, Georges Carpentier, Jimmy Carter, Rubin Carter, Ezzard Charles, Kid Chocolate, Gil Clancy, Freddie Cochrane, Jimmy Carrollo, James J. Corbett, Lulu Costantino, Cus D’Amato, Jack Delaney, Al Davis, Red Top Davis, James P. Dawson, Jack Dempsey, Gus Dorazio, Carl Duane, Chris Dundee, Johnny Dundee, Vince Dundee, Sixto Escobar, Tommy Farr, Abe Feldman, Freddie Fiducia, Jackie Fields, F. Scott Fitzgerald, Billy Fox, Humbert Fugazy, Charley Fusari, Tony Galento, Kid Gavilán, Frankie Genaro, Billy Gibson, Joey Giardello, George Godfrey, Arturo Godoy, Charley Goldman, Ruby Goldstein, Bud Gorman, Billy Graham, Frank Graham, Rocky Graziano, Abe Greene, Gus Greenlee, Emile Griffith, Babe Herman, Steve Hostak, Ace Hudkins, Herbert Hype Igoe, Beau Jack, Tommy Hurricane Jackson, Jimmy Jacobs, Joe Jacobs, Mike Jacobs, Joe Jeanette, Ben Jeby, Lew Jenkins, Jack Johnson, James Johnston, Doug Jones, Ralph Tiger Jones, Phil Kaplan, Jack Kearns, Frankie Klick, Johnny Kilbane, Solly Krieger, Jake LaMotta, Tippy Larkin, Benny Leonard, Gus Lesnevich, King Levinsky, John Henry Lewis, Isaac Logart, Tommy Loughran, Joe Louis, Joe Lynch, Eddie Mader, Nathan Mann, Rocky Marciano, Lloyd Marshall, Eddie Martin, Bat Masterson, Joey Maxim, Jimmy McLarnin, Mike McTigue, Jack Miley, Bob Montgomery, Archie Moore, Tod Morgan, Dan Morgan, Walter Neusel, Kid Norfolk, Lou Nova, Jack O’Brien, Bob Olin, Lee Oma, Carlos Ortiz, Ken Overlin, Benny Kid Paret, Floyd Patterson, Willie Pep, Billy Petrolle, Willie Ratner, Grantland Rice, Gilbert Rogin, Maxie Rosenbloom, Al Roth, Andre Routis, Irving Rudd, Bobby Ruffin, Damon Runyon, Sandy Saddler, Lou Salica, Johnny Saxton, Max Schmeling, Flashy Sebastian, Marty Servo, Jack Sharkey, Battling Siki, Eric Seelig, Freddie Steele, Allie Stolz, Young Stribling, Herman Taylor, Lew Tendler, Sid Terris, Young Terry, Jack Thompson, Jose Torres, Gene Tunney, Pancho Villa, Mickey Walker, Max Waxman, Al Weill, Charlie Weinert, Freddie Welsh, Harry Wills, Charley White, Johnny Wilson, Chalky Wright, Paulino Uzcudun, Jersey Joe Walcott, Ike Williams, Teddy Yarosz.

== Works ==
- Turkish Diplomatic Life in Washington, Under the Old Regime. Cochrane Publishing Company, Tribune Building, 1910. - Bey anonymously published this work - Google Books profile

== See also ==
- Ottoman Armenians
- Ottoman Empire-United States relations
