= Whitey Bimstein =

American boxing trainer and cutman (1897–1969)

- Bimstein in 1947
- Born: Morris Bimstein; January 10, 1897; Lower East Side, Manhattan, New York, U.S.
- Died: July 12, 1969 (aged 72); Bronx, New York, U.S.
- Other names: "Florence Nightingale of the Ring" "King of the minute men"
- Occupations: Boxing trainer and cut man
- Known for: Corner man for 12 world champions

Morris "Whitey" Bimstein (January 10, 1897 – July 12, 1969) was an American boxing trainer who would be remembered for his exceptional career and as a cutman to world champions. Though his cutwork was usually confined to only forty seconds between rounds, it amazed doctors for its thoroughness and professionalism.

== Early life ==
Bimstein was born in New York's Lower East Side, Manhattan, and graduated from the East Side's Public School #62 in 1910, where he competed in track, baseball and basketball. After graduation, his father moved the family to Brook Avenue and 138th Street in the Bronx, which ended Bimstein's formal education. He took to hanging out in the basement of St. Jerome's Catholic Church, where Father Ryan, the pastor, gave boxing lessons. Soon, as a bantamweight, he was fighting four-rounders at New York's Fairmont Athletic Club. He was noticed by Tom McArdle, who, later with Lou Briggs, became Bimstein's manager. But Bimstein was lazy when it came to training, he later admitted. So McArdle started using Bimstein as a sparring partner for his other fighters and eventually as a cornerman. He usually worked at Stillman's Gym daily from noon to 3 p.m.

He boxed professionally for 70 fights, then retired from fighting and joined the U.S. Navy as a WWI boxing instructor in 1918. When he left the Navy, he decided to become a full-time trainer. He formed a partnership with Ray Arcel in 1925 and as a team they developed many of the greatest boxers of their era. Their partnership ended in 1934 due to economic stresses, but Bimstein was still very much in demand, by the fighters that wanted to work with him, the managers who would only trust their fighters to him, and the promoters who trusted him to deliver a well trained conditioned boxer.

Bimstein was one of A.J. Liebling's most reliable informants for his boxing reports in The New Yorker during the 1930s. Notably, he was the subject of a 5000-word profile by Liebling which appeared in the issue of 20 March 1937, pp 31–35, just a few weeks after Bimstein's 40th birthday. Liebling observed that - ″managers pay him to do the thinking for their boys, and his relation to a fighter, particularly a young one, is approximately that of a jockey to a horse. Few fighters ever have as many as a hundred engagements in a lifetime. Whitey, since he quit boxing in proprio persona, in 1917, has thought his way through about fifteen thousand battles as a second. Since history constantly repeats itself in the ring, he knows the answers to most sets of circumstances before even a boxer of genius could fathom them for himself.″

== Champions he seconded ==
Bimstein's greatest early victory and source of recognition may have been his work in Gene Tunney's corner when he defeated Jack Dempsey for the World Heavyweight title in Philadelphia in the fall of 1926. Equally significant was his training James J. Braddock to defeat Max Baer for the World Heavyweight Championship at Madison Square Garden in June 1935. Few believed Braddock could have won prior to his training with Bimstein.

=== List of champions ===
He handled the most outstanding boxers of his era, including Dempsey, Tunney, Braddock, Harry Greb, Georges Carpentier, Jackie (Kid) Berg, Benny Leonard, Sixto Escobar, Lou Ambers, Barney Ross, Fred Apostoli, Max Baer, Primo Carnera, Billy Conn, Rocky Marciano, Billy Graham, Joey Archer, and Rocky Graziano. At one point in the 1930s, he had handled every recognized champion. He later partnered with Freddie Brown, and they had great success with their boxers from the 1950s until Whitey's forced retirement in 1969. His 1959 highlight was Ingemar Johansson, winning the heavyweight crown.

His last heavyweight championship was George Chuvalo for his fight with Muhammad Ali in March 1966 in Toronto. Chuvalo lost the bout on points to the century's best known heavyweight, but avoided a knockout and stayed in the ring for the full fifteen rounds.

Even at the peak of his career, Bimstein would on occasion enter a boxing arena with his medical kit to offer his exceptional skills as a cut man to relatively unknown preliminary fighters, often for little or no compensation and at his own expense.

== Death and legacy ==
In the last years of his life, Bimstein suffered from diabetes. He died at the Kingsbridge Veteran's Hospital in the Bronx on July 12, 1969, at the age of 72.

Whitey's death and obituary had a unique claim to greater recognition as it was in the same widely read Time magazine issue as the July 1969 Apollo 11 Moon landing. His passing was news worthy worldwide. A reporter who knew him for over forty years, believed him to be "not only one of the greatest trainers and cornermen, but as a thoroughly decent gentle man in a turbulent sport." He was inducted into the International Boxing Hall of Fame in 2006, and the New York State Boxing Hall of Fame on March 30, 2014.
