= Al Hostak =

American boxer (1916–2006)

Personal information
- Nickname: The Savage Slav
- Nationality: American
- Born: Albert Paul Hostak; January 7, 1916 Minneapolis, Minnesota, U.S.
- Died: August 13, 2006 (aged 90) Kirkland, Washington, U.S.
- Height: 6 ft 0 in (1.83 m)
- Weight: Middleweight

Boxing career
- Reach: 6 ft 1 in (1.85 m)
- Stance: Orthodox

Boxing record
- Total fights: 84
- Wins: 64
- Win by KO: 41
- Losses: 9
- Draws: 11

Albert (Al) Paul Hostak (January 7, 1916 – August 13, 2006), nicknamed "the Savage Slav," was an American middleweight boxer who fought from 1932-1949. Hostak twice held the National Boxing Association Middleweight title between 1938 and 1940. He was known as a hard puncher and had a record of 64 wins (41 knockouts), 9 losses (3 knockouts), and 11 draws. In 2003, Hostak made The Ring Magazine's list of 100 greatest punchers of all time.

== Early career and life ==
Hostak was born in Minneapolis, Minnesota, to Slovak immigrants who eventually moved to Seattle, Washington when Hostak was two, settling in South Seattle's Georgetown District. Having developed a stutter in his youth, Hostak was drawn to boxing after fighting several of his tormentors. He would begin his boxing career as a 16-year-old in 1932, fighting many of his bouts in nearby White Center. Hostak would go unbeaten for his first 27 bouts in the Seattle area, all four and six-rounders, before losing a decision to Jimmy Best. He would continue to fight preliminary matches through the end of 1936, while he worked as a sparring partner for 1936 middleweight title holder Freddie Steele of Tacoma, Washington.

== Rise to prominence ==
As 1937 began, middleweight champion Freddie Steele's handlers decided to show him on the East Coast away from his home in the Pacific Northwest. With Steele, Seattle's top boxing draw leaving town, Nate Druxman needed to develop another box office attraction, a role Hostak would fulfill in 1937.

Hostak began the year by knocking out Newark middleweight contender Tony Fisher, in two rounds on January 12. A month later he knocked out Leonard Bennett, who had broken Steele's jaw in their first bout. In March and April, Hostak scored second-round knockouts of Johnny Sikes and Young Terry. This set up a bout with Eddie (Babe) Risko on July 13, 1937. Risko lost the middleweight title a year before to Steele, and had lost a rematch as well. Hostak gained national recognition when he knocked out Risko in the 7th round in Seattle. In a clear victory, Risko was floored by Hostak once in the third, and once in the fourth. Catching his opponent flat-footed with no defense, Hostak drove his right with great power into Risko's unguarded chin, followed with two rights to the ribs. Risko went down for the count.

In August, he knocked out Allen Matthews in nine rounds. With three more knockouts in 1937, he stretching his streak to eleven. At the end of 1937, Ring Magazine ranked Hostak the #3 Middleweight in the world.

A match with Steele in Seattle appeared likely for the summer of 1938. Steele suffered a setback in January, when Fred Apostoli stopped him in a non-title bout at Madison Square Garden. In the process, New York recognized Apostoli, not Steele as middleweight champion. Seattle promoter Nate Druxman continued with plans to pit Steele against Hostak that summer.

== Taking the NBA world middleweight championship, Freddie Steele, July, 1938 ==
Hostak's bout with Steele was scheduled for July 26, 1938, at Seattle's Civic Stadium. It would be the largest attendance in Seattle's boxing history, with over 35,000 fans. Hostak used his own jab to parry Steeles's. Feinting with his jab to entice Steele to drop his right hand, he connected with a rapid left hook that travelled only eight inches, but knocked Steele down. Though Steele was up quickly from the initial knockdown, Hostak would send him back to the canvas three more times. Steele arose quickly from his third trip to the canvas, but after a stiff right, Steele was counted out by referee Jack Dempsey at 1:43 of the 1st round, officially giving Hostak his first NBA world middleweight championship. Hostak fought again in September 1938, stopping Young Stuhley in three rounds.

=== Losing the NBA world middleweight title to Solly Krieger, November, 1938 ===
He made his first title defense against Brooklyn's Solly Krieger on November 1, 1938, losing a fifteen round decision before a crowd of 10,000, in Seattle. Hostak broke both of his hands early in the bout. Krieger fought inside against Hostak, pounding his body. In the 14th round, Krieger sealed a majority decision victory, when he knocked down a tired Hostak for the first time in his career. With terrific body blows, and savage and effective infighting, Krieger wrested the championship from Hostak. Krieger employed a successful bob and weave strategy, which puzzled Hostak, and which he could not successfully defend, particularly in later rounds.

== Retaking the world middleweight championship, Solly Krieger, June, 1939 ==
After his hands had healed, Hostak returned with a third-round knockout of Johnny Erjavec in Seattle, before facing Krieger before a huge crowd of 22,000 in a world middleweight championship rematch in Seattle on June 27, 1939. In the seven and a half months between their two bouts, Krieger boxed as a light heavyweight having a very difficult time making the 160-pound middleweight limit. Krieger was a shadow of his former self in the rematch, forcing himself to lose weight too quickly, and Hostak knocked him down four times. Hostak forced Krieger to take the lead, but when he took a defensive crouch, Hostak opened him up with blows to the midsection. In the fourth Hostak knocked Krieger to the canvas with a flurry of lefts and rights for a count of nine. On his second trip to the canvas, the referee called a fourth-round TKO. Hostak became the first boxer to regain the middleweight title since Stanley Ketchel in 1908.

After an October 1939 non-title knockout over Charley Coates, Hostak signed for his first bout ever outside of the state of Washington, facing German-Jewish refugee Eric Seelig in Cleveland on December 11, 1939. On December 11, 1935 Seelig fought an NBA world middleweight title match against Al Hostak before an enthusiastic crowd of 10,000 at the Arena in Cleveland, Ohio, losing in a first round knockout of a scheduled fifteen rounds. Seelig sparred cautiously in the opening of the round, but was sent to the canvas from a crushing left hook to the right side of his jaw, and could not resume the bout until a count of nine was completed. A left and right put him to the canvas for the count 1:21 into the first round.

=== Losing the NBA world middleweight title with injured hands to Tony Zale, July, 1940 ===
Nate Druxman rematched Hostak and Zale for the middleweight title on July 19, 1940, before a crowd of 16,000, at Civic Stadium in Seattle. Once again Hostak injured his hands in the bout, while Zale wore him down with a devastating body attack. Before badly injuring his hands, Hostak had his best round in the fifth when he dished out his heaviest punches, and left Zale groggy. With both of his eyes swollen, and his left hand apparently injured, Hostak was dropped in the 12th for a count of nine and again in 13th rounds, before the bout was stopped 1:20 in the thirteenth by referee Benny Leonard and Zale took the title from Hostak. Zale's rushing attack with left hooks to the head, and occasional uppercuts to the chin, proved too much for Hostak, particularly in the second half of the bout.

Earlier on January 29, 1940, Hostak had unsuccessfully fought a non-title match before a crowd of 11,112 in Chicago against middleweight contender Zale at Chicago Stadium. It may be important to note that Hostak knocked Zale down in the 1st round, breaking two fingers in his left hand in the 5th round. As a result, Zale swept the last five rounds to take a unanimous decision.

== Post-championship boxing career ==
After taking time for his hands to heal, Hostak returned in February 1941 with a knockout win in Chicago, followed up by two more knockouts in April and May in Seattle. He returned to Chicago to face Zale in a third fight on May 28, 1941. Hostak knocked down Zale early, but he was up before a count could be administered. In the 2nd round, Zale pounded Hostak to the body, dropping him eight times, before he was finally counted out. In November, Hostak would make his first and only appearance at Madison Square Garden, against former middleweight champion Ken Overlin. Overlin easily outboxed a befuddled Hostak, who threw very few punches before losing a lopsided decision.

In Hostak's absence from Seattle, another middleweight attraction had been developed by Druxman, Harry (Kid) Matthews of Emmett, Idaho. The two would face each other on September 29, 1942, in Seattle, with Hostak knocking Matthews down twice, but again being outboxed, losing a majority decision. The two would fight to a draw in a November rematch in Seattle. This time both boxers performed more poorly than in their first bout, particularly Matthews, who spent much of the bout in retreat. Hostak's boxing career temporarily ended along with Druxman's after the bout, as both did service in World War II. Hostak joined the Army in 1942, and trained as a paratrooper, serving in the 101st Airborne. His overseas duty included acting as part of the occupying force in Japan, according to his son.

Hostak had two bouts in 1944 while stationed in Houston, Texas, scoring a pair of knockouts. On June 21, 1944, he defeated Glen Lee in a third round knockout for the USA Texas Light Heavyweight championship while serving as a Corporal in the army. Both contestants were serving in the armed forces, and Jack Dempsey, a Lieutenant Commander in the Navy served as referee. The match raised millions in war bonds.

He made his post-war return in June 1946, with four more knockouts against modest opposition. He took on middleweight contender Steve Belloise in Houston in January 1947. He sent Belloise to the mat in the 1st, but was knocked out in the 4th. After a 5th-round TKO over Anton Raadik in August 1947 in Chicago, Hostak avenged his loss to Belloise by winning a decision in Seattle before a crowd of 7,000 on August 26. Hostak put Belloise down for a seven count in the second, and had an edge in eight of the ten rounds with only one to Belloise and one even. With the win, the 31-year-old Hostak again earned a rating and wide recognition as a middleweight contender.

Hostak's resurgence would be short-lived, as he was held to a draw in a mixed decision on October 7, 1947 by George Duke, with many fans thinking Duke had outboxed him. He then lost a split decision in Portland, Oregon, to Jack Snapp, followed by a draw to Paul Perkins. In December 1948, Hostak decisioned Perkins in a rematch, before finishing his career on his 33rd birthday by stopping Snapp in nine rounds in Seattle.

=== Life after boxing ===
After boxing, Hostak held jobs as a bartender, a King County Jail guard, and a security guard at the Longacres Race Track. He even taught school-age kids how to defend themselves in fights. Hostak was married to Rose Francis in 1948. He died on August 13, 2006, in Kirkland, Washington, of complications from a stroke that he suffered ten days earlier, and was interred at Calvary Catholic Cemetery in Seattle. He was inducted into the World Boxing Hall of Fame in 1997.

== Professional boxing record ==
84 fights	64 wins	9 losses
By knockout	41	3
By decision	23	6
Draws	11	

No.	Result	Record	Opponent	Type	Round	Date	Location	Notes
84	Win	64–9–11	Jack Snapp	KO	9 (10)	Jan 7, 1949	Civic Auditorium, Seattle, Washington, U.S.	
83	Win	63–9–11	Paul Perkins	UD	10	Dec 9, 1948	Armory, Tacoma, Washington, U.S.	
82	Draw	62–9–11	Paul Perkins	PTS	10	Nov 26, 1948	Armory, Bellingham, Washington, U.S.	
81	Loss	62–9–10	Jack Snapp	SD	10	Mar 16, 1948	Auditorium, Portland, Oregon, U.S.	
80	Draw	62–8–10	George Duke	MD	10	Oct 7, 1947	Civic Auditorium, Seattle, Washington, U.S.	
79	Win	62–8–9	Steve Belloise	PTS	10	Aug 26, 1947	Civic Stadium, Seattle, Washington, U.S.	
78	Win	61–8–9	Anton Raadik	TKO	5 (10)	Jun 6, 1947	Chicago Stadium, Chicago, Illinois, U.S.	
77	Loss	60–8–9	Steve Belloise	KO	4 (10)	Jan 22, 1947	Houston, Texas, U.S.	
76	Win	60–7–9	Benny Droll	TKO	2 (10)	Jan 7, 1947	Civic Auditorium, Seattle, Washington, U.S.	
75	Win	59–7–9	Sam Hughes	KO	1 (10)	Nov 12, 1946	Civic Auditorium, Seattle, Washington, U.S.	
74	Win	58–7–9	George Evans	KO	1 (10)	Oct 22, 1946	Civic Auditorium, Seattle, Washington, U.S.	
73	Win	57–7–9	Roman Starr	KO	4 (10)	Jun 4, 1946	Civic Ice Arena, Seattle, Washington, U.S.	
72	Win	56–7–9	Glen Lee	KO	3 (10)	Jun 21, 1944	Coliseum, Houston, Texas, U.S.	Won vacant USA Texas light heavyweight title
71	Win	55–7–9	George Baratko	KO	5 (10)	Apr 4, 1944	Houston, Texas, U.S.	
70	Draw	54–7–9	Harry Matthews	PTS	10	Nov 6, 1942	Civic Auditorium, Seattle, Washington, U.S.	
69	Loss	54–7–8	Harry Matthews	MD	10	Sep 29, 1942	Civic Ice Arena, Seattle, Washington, U.S.	
68	Loss	54–6–8	Ken Overlin	UD	10	Nov 21, 1941	Madison Square Garden, New York City, New York, U.S.	
67	Loss	54–5–8	Tony Zale	KO	2 (15)	May 28, 1941	Chicago Stadium Outdoor Arena, Chicago, Illinois, U.S.	For NBA middleweight title
66	Win	54–4–8	Atilio Sabatino	TKO	1 (10)	May 5, 1941	Civic Auditorium, Seattle, Washington, U.S.	
65	Win	53–4–8	Ben Brown	KO	3 (10)	Apr 1, 1941	Civic Auditorium, Seattle, Washington, U.S.	
64	Win	52–4–8	George Burnette	KO	1 (10)	Feb 21, 1941	Chicago Stadium, Chicago, Illinois, U.S.	
63	Loss	51–4–8	Tony Zale	TKO	13 (15)	Jul 19, 1940	Civic Stadium, Seattle, Washington, U.S.	Lost NBA middleweight title
62	Loss	51–3–8	Tony Zale	UD	10	Jan 29, 1940	Chicago Stadium, Chicago, Illinois, U.S.	
61	Win	51–2–8	Erich Seelig	KO	1 (15)	Dec 11, 1939	Arena, Cleveland, Ohio, U.S.	Retained NBA middleweight title
60	Win	50–2–8	Charley Coates	KO	3 (10)	Oct 26, 1939	Greenwich Coliseum, Tacoma, Washington, U.S.	
59	Win	49–2–8	Solly Krieger	TKO	4 (15)	Jun 27, 1939	Civic Stadium, Seattle, Washington, U.S.	Won NBA middleweight title
58	Win	48–2–8	Johnny Erjavec	KO	3 (10)	Mar 7, 1939	Crystal Pool, Seattle, Washington, U.S.	
57	Loss	47–2–8	Solly Krieger	MD	15	Nov 1, 1938	Civic Stadium, Seattle, Washington, U.S.	Lost NBA middleweight title
56	Win	47–1–8	Young Stuhley	TKO	3 (10)	Sep 19, 1938	Civic Stadium, Seattle, Washington, U.S.	
55	Win	46–1–8	Freddie Steele	KO	1 (15)	Jul 26, 1938	Civic Stadium, Seattle, Washington, U.S.	Won NBA middleweight title
54	Win	45–1–8	Chief Parris	KO	4 (10)	Apr 12, 1938	Civic Ice Arena, Seattle, Washington, U.S.	
53	Win	44–1–8	Swede Berglund	TKO	2 (10)	Mar 1, 1938	Civic Auditorium, Seattle, Washington, U.S.	
52	Win	43–1–8	Jack Hibbard	TKO	1 (10)	Jan 11, 1938	Crystal Pool, Seattle, Washington, U.S.	
51	Win	42–1–8	Don La Rue	KO	1 (10)	Dec 2, 1937	Greenwich Coliseum, Tacoma, Washington, U.S.	
50	Win	41–1–8	Bob Turner	KO	2 (10)	Nov 2, 1937	Crystal Pool, Seattle, Washington, U.S.	
49	Win	40–1–8	Otto Blackwell	KO	3 (10)	Oct 14, 1937	Greenwich Coliseum, Tacoma, Washington, U.S.	
48	Win	39–1–8	Allen Matthews	TKO	9 (10)	Aug 10, 1937	Civic Ice Arena, Seattle, Washington, U.S.	
47	Win	38–1–8	Eddie Babe Risko	KO	7 (10)	Jul 13, 1937	Civic Ice Arena, Seattle, Washington, U.S.	
46	Win	37–1–8	Young Terry	TKO	2 (10)	Apr 13, 1937	Civic Ice Arena, Seattle, Washington, U.S.	
45	Win	36–1–8	Johnny Sikes	KO	2 (10)	Mar 9, 1937	Crystal Pool, Seattle, Washington, U.S.	
44	Win	35–1–8	Leonard Bennett	KO	8 (10)	Feb 16, 1937	Crystal Pool, Seattle, Washington, U.S.	
43	Win	34–1–8	Tony Fisher	KO	2 (10)	Jan 12, 1937	Crystal Pool, Seattle, Washington, U.S.	
42	Win	33–1–8	Irish Johnny Smith	KO	2 (6)	Dec 15, 1936	Crystal Pool, Seattle, Washington, U.S.	
41	Win	32–1–8	Jim Nealey	KO	1 (10)	Nov 10, 1936	Crystal Pool, Seattle, Washington, U.S.	
40	Win	31–1–8	Don La Rue	PTS	8	Oct 6, 1936	Crystal Pool, Seattle, Washington, U.S.	
39	Win	30–1–8	Mike Bazzone	TKO	4 (6)	Sep 22, 1936	Crystal Pool, Seattle, Washington, U.S.	
38	Draw	29–1–8	Irish Ed Bradley	PTS	6	Sep 3, 1936	Armory, Spokane, Washington, U.S.	
37	Win	29–1–7	Don La Rue	PTS	6	Aug 20, 1936	Greenwich Coliseum, Tacoma, Washington, U.S.	
36	Win	28–1–7	Billy Lancaster	PTS	6	Jul 30, 1936	Gonzaga Stadium, Spokane, Washington, U.S.	
35	Win	27–1–7	Sidney Brent	PTS	6	Jul 11, 1936	Civic Stadium, Seattle, Washington, U.S.	
34	Draw	26–1–7	Jimmy Best	PTS	6	Jan 28, 1936	Crystal Pool, Seattle, Washington, U.S.	
33	Win	26–1–6	Baby Joe Gans	PTS	8	Dec 17, 1935	Crystal Pool, Seattle, Washington, U.S.	
32	Win	25–1–6	Billy Lancaster	PTS	6	Dec 3, 1935	Crystal Pool, Seattle, Washington, U.S.	
31	Win	24–1–6	Billy Lancaster	TKO	5 (6)	Nov 19, 1935	Civic Auditorium, Seattle, Washington, U.S.	
30	Win	23–1–6	Eddie Ivory	TKO	2 (6)	Nov 5, 1935	Civic Auditorium, Seattle, Washington, U.S.	
29	Win	22–1–6	Wild Willie Walker	PTS	4	Oct 29, 1935	Crystal Pool, Seattle, Washington, U.S.	
28	Win	21–1–6	Sidney Brent	PTS	4	Jul 30, 1935	Civic Ice Arena, Seattle, Washington, U.S.	
27	Loss	20–1–6	Jimmy Best	PTS	6	May 16, 1935	Greenwich Coliseum, Tacoma, Washington, U.S.	
26	Draw	20–0–6	Dick Johnson	PTS	6	Mar 21, 1935	Greenwich Coliseum, Tacoma, Washington, U.S.	
25	Draw	20–0–5	Cecil Jordan	PTS	6	Feb 21, 1935	Greenwich Coliseum, Tacoma, Washington, U.S.	
24	Draw	20–0–4	Johnny Foster	PTS	6	Feb 14, 1935	Arena, White Center, Washington, U.S.	
23	Draw	20–0–3	Jack Hibbard	PTS	6	Feb 7, 1935	Arena, White Center, Washington, U.S.	
22	Draw	20–0–2	Jack Hibbard	PTS	4	Jan 24, 1935	Greenwich Coliseum, Tacoma, Washington, U.S.	
21	Win	20–0–1	Jimmy Ireland	KO	2 (4)	Aug 21, 1934	Civic Ice Arena, Seattle, Washington, U.S.	
20	Win	19–0–1	Eddie Foster	KO	2 (4)	May 22, 1934	Civic Ice Arena, Seattle, Washington, U.S.	
19	Win	18–0–1	Jimmy Hefferman	PTS	4	Feb 6, 1934	Civic Auditorium, Seattle, Washington, U.S.	
18	Win	17–0–1	Jimmy Kid Swanson	PTS	6	Feb 1, 1934	Greenwich Coliseum, Tacoma, Washington, U.S.	
17	Win	16–0–1	Bob F Jeffries	KO	4 (4)	Jan 11, 1934	Greenwich Coliseum, Tacoma, Washington, U.S.	
16	Win	15–0–1	Willis Over	PTS	4	Dec 8, 1933	Arena, White Center, Washington, U.S.	
15	Win	14–0–1	Phil Beck	PTS	4	Nov 23, 1933	Arena, White Center, Washington, U.S.	
14	Draw	13–0–1	Jack Hibbard	PTS	6	Oct 1, 1933	Seattle, Washington, U.S.	Uncertain of Date
13	Win	13–0	Alec Webber	PTS	6	Apr 27, 1933	Arena, White Center, Washington, U.S.	
12	Win	12–0	Phil Gleason	KO	2 (?)	Apr 13, 1933	Arena, White Center, Washington, U.S.	
11	Win	11–0	Heinie Roberts	PTS	4	Mar 9, 1933	Arena, White Center, Washington, U.S.	
10	Win	10–0	Eddie Umbertos	KO	2 (4)	Feb 16, 1933	Arena, White Center, Washington, U.S.	
9	Win	9–0	Heinie Roberts	PTS	4	Feb 2, 1933	Arena, White Center, Washington, U.S.	
8	Win	8–0	Heinie Roberts	PTS	4	Jan 19, 1933	Arena, White Center, Washington, U.S.	
7	Win	7–0	Heinie Roberts	PTS	4	Nov 1, 1932	Seattle, Washington, U.S.	Exact date unknown
6	Win	6–0	Heinie Roberts	PTS	4	Oct 1, 1932	Seattle, Washington, U.S.	Uncertain of Date
5	Win	5–0	Allen Franks	PTS	4	Sep 22, 1932	Arena, White Center, Washington, U.S.	
4	Win	4–0	Hank Wharton	PTS	4	Aug 8, 1932	Austin & Bishop Club, Seattle, Washington, U.S.	
3	Win	3–0	Vern Moen	PTS	4	Aug 1, 1932	Seattle, Washington, U.S.	Uncertain of Date
2	Win	2–0	Al Brown	KO	1 (4)	Jul 1, 1932	Seattle, Washington, U.S.	Uncertain of Date
1	Win	1–0	Jimmy Smith	KO	3 (4)	May 20, 1932	Seattle, Washington, U.S.	Date uncertain

Preceded by Freddie Steele	NBA Middleweight Champion; 26 Jul 1938 – 1 Nov 1938	Succeeded by Solly Krieger
Preceded by Solly Krieger	NBA Middleweight Champion; 27 Jun 1939 – 19 Jul 1940	Succeeded by Tony Zale
Sporting positions
Previous: Max Schmeling	Oldest Living World Champion; February 2, 2005 – August 13, 2006	Next: Jake LaMotta
