= Solly Krieger =

American boxer (1909–1964)

Personal information
- Nicknames: Danny Auerback, Brooklyn Bomber
- Nationality: American
- Born: Solly Krieger; March 28, 1909 Brooklyn, New York, U.S.
- Died: September 24, 1964 (aged 55) Las Vegas, Nevada, U.S.
- Height: 5 ft 8 in (1.73 m)
- Weight: Middleweight; Light heavyweight; Heavyweight

Boxing career
- Reach: 68 in (173 cm)
- Stance: Orthodox

Boxing record
- Total fights: 113
- Wins: 82
- Win by KO: 54
- Losses: 25
- Draws: 6

Solly Krieger (March 28, 1909 – September 24, 1964) was an American middleweight boxer who fought from 1928 to 1941. He held the NBA World Middleweight Championship in 1938–39. Krieger, who was Jewish, was inducted into the International Jewish Sports Hall of Fame.

== Early life ==
Krieger was born on March 28, 1909, in the Williamsburg section of Brooklyn, New York. He attended Eastern District High School, and was active in baseball, football, basketball, and soccer, but preferred boxing to his other sports. His father, who was born in Poland and was initially a tailor, was religiously observant, and had strong opposition to his son Solly's youthful desire to pursue boxing as a career.

Krieger was a Golden Gloves champion in his amateur career. In 1928, turning professional, he was mentored by the legendary Hymie Caplan, who had also coached Syd Terris, Ruby Goldstein, and Al Singer.

== Early boxing career ==
Between 1928 and 1931, he won eighteen four to six round bouts in clubs, with an impressive nine by knockout. He lost only twice to Jose Rodriguez on August 15, 1929, and Joey LeGrey, on May 26, 1930.

Very early in his career he was known as a cautious boxer with strong defensive skills. After surgery for an injured left elbow, the result of a handball accident, he lost his ability to jab with his left hand, and found the need to develop more powerful blows. As a result, he became a more free wheeling heavy hitter with a very strong left hook. As he was relatively short armed but powerful for a middleweight, he preferred to box on the inside and from clinches where his reach was not a disadvantage.

In June 1931, after Mickey Walker relinquished the title, there was no universally recognized World Champion to fill his shoes.

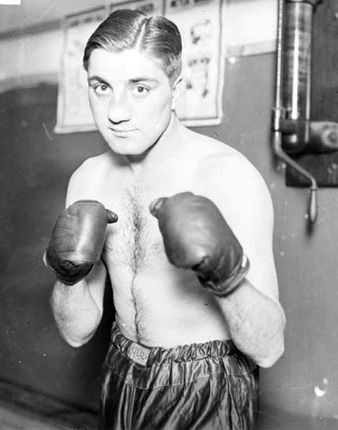
Vince Dundee

On October 16, 1931, Krieger was knocked out for the first time in his career by future 1933 Middleweight Champion Vince Dundee in Madison Square Garden in eight of ten rounds.

In 1934, having problems with his arm, he fought only twice. The surgery he had to correct the problem removed calcium deposits, but left him with a left arm slightly shorter than his right. He adopted a style that allowed him to have his best years in 1935–36 winning with great frequency and utilizing his strength, counterpunching, and defensive skills. On October 22, 1936, he won an exciting twelve-round match against Oscar Rankins in Pittsburgh, Pennsylvania. Describing how he could appear to be taking a beating in a fight like the one with Rankins, while actually avoiding or blocking most of the blows coming his way, he once said, "I started walking in on my opponents but I countered. People used to think I was taking a beating, but I could weave while standing still...I'd walk in and look like I was a punching bag half the time, but I'd never get hit. That operation (on left arm) was the turning point of my life." The Pittsburgh Press noted how Krieger appeared to be taking serious punishment in the Rankin fight, but came back stronger. It wrote "From a mile behind to a mile in front came Krieger after the Coast colored boy (Rankin) tired, principally from rocking right hands off Solly's chin and sinking both hands deep in his body. And when he came there was no stopping. Unmarked, despite being a perfect target in the early rounds..." Many newspapers considered the fight one of the greatest middleweight bouts of all time.

== Mid boxing career ==
In 1937, the New York State Athletic Commission named Frank Apolstoli and Solly Krieger number one, and number two respectively in their divisions. To determine which boxer would reign as the number one middleweight, Krieger and Apostoli fought on April 4, 1937, at the Hippodrome in New York. Suffering from a deep cut in his lower lip, Krieger had to discontinue the fight, resulting in a TKO in the fifth round. Doctor William Walker made the determination to end the bout at the end of the fifth but had considered ending the fight in the prior round. Krieger had previously lost to Apostoli on February 17, 1937, on points in an exciting ten round bout at the Hippodrome. Both bouts were a setback for Krieger, but not an end to his quest for the title.

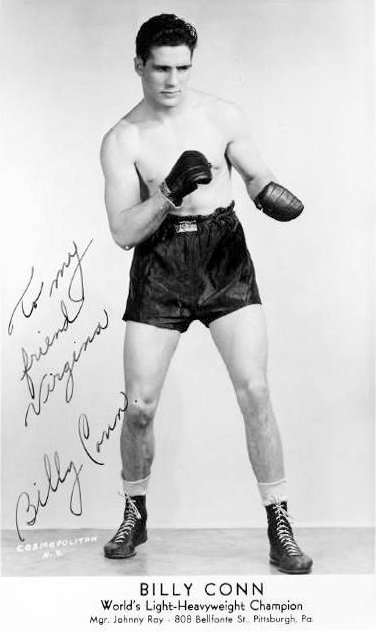
BillyConn

Krieger had three important bouts with Billy Conn, who would take the Light Heavyweight Championship after their last bout. In their first bout on December 16, 1937, he won decisively by unanimous decision in Pittsburgh in twelve rounds. Billy Conn later said of the bout, "This guy Krieger was the toughest...I ever fought. I ached for a week after my first fight with him. He could lick anything around now." In their second bout on November 28, 1938, again in Duquesne Garden, in Pittsburgh, Krieger lost by unanimous decision in twelve rounds.

In 1938, Krieger won five straight knockouts, starting with George Black, and Al Diamond in one round, Johnny Rossi in four, and then Stanley Hasrato in seven. In his knockout against Izzy Jannazzo, on April 6, 1938, at the Hippodrome, Krieger effectively used strong body blows to win the fight, but did not gain the eleventh-round TKO until his "wild punches" began to land. Janazzo had neither the reach nor the skills of Conn or Hostak who were both over four inches taller than Solly. In his May 20, 1938, loss to Glen Lee at Madison Square Garden, Krieger lost all but one round in the opinion of the Milwaukee Journal, despite a recent layoff by Lee. Krieger's loss to a boxer who had no advantage in reach did not bode well for his upcoming fight with the more skilled and slightly taller Freddie Steele. The Journal also noted that Lee was able to send hooks to Krieger throughout the bout, indicating that Solly was having trouble defending during infighting.

Krieger had a setback against ranked opponent and reigning NBA World Middleweight Title holder Freddie Steele, on June 14, 1938, in a ten-round loss by unanimous decision in Seattle, Washington. Continuing to fight in California, he came back with impressive wins against Swede Bergland, Ace of Spades, and Dale Spar, gaining the positive press he needed to push a title match.

== Winning the World Middleweight Championship ==
Al Hostak, Middleweight Champion

Before meeting Krieger in their first title fight, Al Hostak knocked out 17 straight opponents. Hostak's mastery of boxing and powerful punching capability was clearly evident. Nonetheless, on November 1, 1938, at Civic Stadium in Seattle, Washington, Krieger won the National Boxing Association World Middleweight Championship in a 15-round majority decision over the reigning champion. The fighting was fierce on both sides but the crowd of 9,000 were surprised to see Krieger gaining the victory. The Spokesman wrote Krieger raised big red welts on Hostak's left side from terrific right hooks," and that "Several times Hostak tried to use his left, then winced and reeled, apparently because of paralysis of the left side." The Spokesman also noted that Hostak was the favorite in the pre-fight betting. It wrote, "Krieger, a rough, tough, infighter at his best against hard punchers, took the offensive almost from the start, and from the sixth round it was apparent the Seattle Slav (Hostak) was in for a busy evening." After the fight, Hostak was sent to a local emergency room to be treated for his paralysis. According to the Southeast Missourian, Hostak was "temporarily blinded" from swelling caused by Krieger's repeated blows to his face and eyes.

After his win over Hostak, Krieger's coach Hymie Caplan made an understandable decision to forgo any challenger a title shot for a six-month period. Krieger fought over the 160 pound middleweight limit for nearly all of this period, and had a difficult time getting back down to 160 for the Hostak rematch. He still fought regularly after he captured the title from Hostak, facing Billy Conn twice in tough losses, as well as Carmen Bath, Red Farmer, Marty Simmons, Ben Brown, and Alan Matthews. In the Matthews bout on April 5, 1939, Krieger effectively used infighting, with close body blows and hooks to defeat an opponent who was less a threat than Hostak or Steele. According to the Spokesman Review, both the knockdowns he obtained in the bout with Matthews were from hooks which required him to get in fairly close to his opponent. Notably, Matthews had only a two-inch height advantage over Krieger. Inside blows would be more difficult to execute with an opponent having greater defensive skills and a longer reach.

== Harsh loss to Billy Conn before title rematch ==
In his final fight with Billy Conn on May 12, 1939, Krieger lost again in twelve rounds by unanimous decision in front of a sizable audience in Madison Square Garden. Though outweighing Krieger by only four pounds in the bout, Conn was significantly nine years younger and five inches taller, giving him an important advantage in reach, and probably in endurance as well. As evidence of Conn's superior strength and conditioning, he would take the Light Heavyweight Title on July 13, 1939, only two months after his bout with Krieger. The Milwaukee Journal noted that Krieger was unable to fight effectively inside, possibly due to his shorter reach. The Journal wrote "Conn handled his rival as though he were little more than an animated punching bag for 11 of the 12 rounds. Using a left hand to the face which rarely missed its mark, Conn dominated the proceedings almost completely at long range." It also noted that even in the eleventh when Krieger was able to connect with shots to the midsection, "Conn kept out of range and came up for the twelfth...as fresh as when he started." In a recap of the fight, the Luddington Daily News, wrote "Solly tried so hard it almost hurt to watch him. He lunged at his nimble rival round after round, swinging for dear life, but all he got for his most heroic efforts was a painful beating..."

Any injuries sustained in this loss may have given Krieger a disadvantage in the title fight he lost to Hostak only a month and a half later. In fact, the Milwaukee Journal, writing in anticipation of Krieger's rematch with Hostak, noted "The champion (Krieger) was on the short end of 10 to 7 odds," and noted that "the beating Krieger took awhile back from Billy Conn didn't do him any good." One source gave nine rounds to Conn in the fight, and noted "There wasn't a knockdown, though it was strange that Solly kept his feet under the barrage of left-rights that poured into his granite jaw in the late rounds." After taking what might have been one of the most brutal losses of his career, Krieger gained nearly twelve pounds in the six weeks before his title fight.

== Losing the Middleweight Championship ==
In a rematch in Civic Stadium in Seattle, Hostak regained the championship on June 27, 1939, in front of a larger hometown crowd estimated at over 15,000. Kreiger struggled to make weight for the bout. By the account of The Seattle Post-Intelligencer, Krieger was a mere shadow of the fighter who had won the title. Hostak easily won, knocking Krieger down twice in the third and again twice in the fourth round. Krieger was down for counts of seven and nine in the third, and for another count of nine in the fourth. He rose only briefly after the count to be knocked down again by a flurry of blows from Hostak. The referee, heavyweight champion James Braddock, did not perform a count, but ended the fight after the second knockdown, forty-six seconds into the fourth round. It was Krieger's first title fight after beating Hostak seven months earlier. The Milwaukee Journal wrote that in the fourth round, "Krieger, his eyes glazed and staring, slumped to the canvas in midring and sat there in a stupor for several seconds before his handlers trundled him to his corner." After the defeat, Krieger attributed his loss to the difficult task he had losing twenty pounds in a month to make weight, and the terrific right hand of Hostak.

== Boxing in the heavyweight division ==
After his loss of the title, Kreiger moved up to Light Heavyweight. He fought thirteen fights in the heavyweight division gaining victories in 1940 against Texas Joe Dundee, Mario Liani, Herbi Katz, Jarl Johnson, and Wally Sears. He fought his last fight as a Heavyweight, against Lee Savold, a serious world heavyweight contender, in July 1941, his fifth loss in his final six fights.

== Personal life ==
Krieger was married to Sally Keisler, and had two children, Lawrence and Karen.

== Professional boxing record ==
113 fights	82 wins	25 losses
By knockout	54	3
By decision	28	22
Draws	6	

No.	Result	Record	Opponent	Type	Round, time	Date	Location	Notes
113	Loss	82–25–6	Lee Savold	PTS	10	Jul 22, 1941	Ebbets Field, New York City, New York, US	
112	Loss	82–24–6	Booker Beckwith	UD	10	May 28, 1941	Chicago Stadium Outdoor Arena, Chicago, Illinois, US	
111	Win	82–23–6	Dan Gill	TKO	6 (10)	May 13, 1941	Olympic Auditorium, Los Angeles, California, US	
110	Loss	81–23–6	Pat Valentino	PTS	10	Mar 10, 1941	Coliseum Bowl, San Francisco, California, US	
109	Loss	81–22–6	Melio Bettina	UD	10	Dec 17, 1940	Broadway Arena, New York City, New York, US	
108	Loss	81–21–6	Tommy Tucker	PTS	8	Nov 1, 1940	Madison Square Garden, New York City, New York, US	
107	Win	81–20–6	Wally Sears	TKO	3 (10)	Aug 12, 1940	Dexter Park Arena, New York City, New York, US	
106	Win	80–20–6	Jarl Johnsen	KO	4 (8), 2:50	Jul 18, 1940	Fort Hamilton Arena, New York City, New York, US	
105	Win	79–20–6	Al McCoy	PTS	10	Jul 1, 1940	Dexter Park Arena, New York City, New York, US	
104	Loss	78–20–6	Jimmy Reeves	PTS	10	May 16, 1940	Public Hall, Cleveland, Ohio, US	
103	Win	78–19–6	Herbie Katz	KO	4 (8), 0:40	Apr 23, 1940	Broadway Arena, New York City, New York, US	
102	Win	77–19–6	Mario Liani	KO	5 (8)	Feb 17, 1940	Ridgewood Grove, New York City, New York, US	
101	Win	76–19–6	Texas Joe Dundee	TKO	3 (8)	Feb 3, 1940	Ridgewood Grove, New York City, New York, US	
100	Loss	75–19–6	Al Hostak	TKO	4 (15), 0:45	Jun 27, 1939	Civic Stadium, Seattle, Washington, US	Lost NBA middleweight title
99	Loss	75–18–6	Billy Conn	UD	12	May 12, 1939	Madison Square Garden, New York City, New York, US	
98	Win	75–17–6	Allen Matthews	PTS	10	Apr 5, 1939	Civic Auditorium, Seattle, Florida, US	
97	Win	74–17–6	Ben Brown	TKO	9 (10)	Feb 23, 1939	Orange Bowl, Miami, Florida, US	
96	Draw	73–17–6	Marty Simmons	PTS	10	Jan 2, 1939	Auditorium, Milwaukee, Wisconsin, US	
95	Win	73–17–5	Red Farmer	TKO	8 (10)	Dec 16, 1938	Dreamland Auditorium, San Francisco, California, US	
94	Win	72–17–5	Carmen Barth	PTS	10	Dec 5, 1938	Arena, Cleveland, Ohio, US	
93	Loss	71–17–5	Billy Conn	UD	12	Nov 28, 1938	Duquesne Garden, Pittsburgh, Pennsylvania, US	
92	Win	71–16–5	Al Hostak	MD	15	Nov 1, 1938	Civic Auditorium, Seattle, Washington, US	Won NBA middleweight title
91	Win	70–16–5	Dale Sparr	RTD	6 (10)	Aug 10, 1938	Auditorium, Oakland, California, US	
90	Win	69–16–5	Ace of Spades	TKO	4 (10)	Aug 10, 1938	Auditorium, Oakland, California, US	
89	Win	68–16–5	Swede Berglund	TKO	6 (10), 0:45	Jul 15, 1938	Gilmore Stadium, Los Angeles, California, US	
88	Loss	67–16–5	Freddie Steele	UD	10	Jun 14, 1938	Civic Ice Arena, Seattle, Washington, US	
87	Loss	67–15–5	Glen Lee	UD	10	May 20, 1938	Madison Square Garden, New York City, New York, US	
86	Win	67–14–5	Izzy Jannazzo	TKO	11 (12), 2:12	Apr 6, 1938	Hippodrome, New York City, New York, US	
85	Win	66–14–5	Stanley Hasrato	KO	7 (8), 1:26	Mar 8, 1938	New York Coliseum, New York City, New York, US	
84	Win	65–14–5	Johnny Rossi	KO	4 (10), 1:59	Feb 9, 1938	Hippodrome, New York City, New York, US	
83	Win	64–14–5	Al Diamond	KO	1 (10), 2:10	Jan 25, 1938	Broadway Arena, New York City, New York, US	
82	Win	63–14–5	George Black	TKO	3 (10)	Jan 1, 1938	Auditorium, Milwaukee, Wisconsin, US	
81	Win	62–14–5	Billy Conn	UD	12	Dec 16, 1937	Duquesne Garden, Pittsburgh, Pennsylvania, US	
80	Win	61–14–5	Frank Battaglia	PTS	10	Nov 17, 1937	Hippodrome, New York City, New York, US	
79	Win	60–14–5	Eddie Maguire	TKO	7 (12), 1:13	Oct 26, 1937	Broadway Arena, New York City, New York, US	
78	Loss	59–14–5	Walter Woods	PTS	10	Oct 1, 1937	Hippodrome, New York City, New York, US	
77	Win	59–13–5	Walter Woods	KO	8 (10)	Aug 12, 1937	Madison Square Garden, New York City, New York, US	
76	Win	58–13–5	Joe Duca	TKO	6 (10)	Aug 3, 1937	Canarsie Stadium, New York City, New York, US	
75	Loss	57–13–5	Fred Apostoli	TKO	5 (12)	Apr 14, 1937	Hippodrome, New York City, New York, US	Stopped on cuts
74	Win	57–12–5	Eddie Maguire	TKO	4 (10)	Mar 30, 1937	Broadway Arena, New York City, New York, US	
73	Loss	56–12–5	Oscar Rankins	SD	10	Mar 18, 1937	Duquesne Garden, Pittsburgh, Pennsylvania, US	
72	Loss	56–11–5	Fred Apostoli	UD	10	Feb 17, 1937	Hippodrome, New York City, New York, US	
71	Win	56–10–5	Bob Turner	TKO	7 (10)	Feb 2, 1937	Broadway Arena, New York City, New York, US	Turner did not answer the bell for the 8th round, due to a lacerated lip
70	Loss	55–10–5	Teddy Yarosz	UD	10	Jan 13, 1937	Hippodrome, New York City, New York, US	
69	Win	55–9–5	Harry Balsamo	TKO	7 (10), 1:37	Dec 16, 1936	Hippodrome, New York City, New York, US	
68	Win	54–9–5	Roscoe Manning	UD	10	Nov 17, 1936	Broadway Arena, New York City, New York, US	
67	Win	53–9–5	Oscar Rankins	PTS	12	Oct 22, 1936	Duquesne Garden, Pittsburgh, Pennsylvania, US	
66	Win	52–9–5	John Andersson	UD	10	Oct 6, 1936	Broadway Arena, New York City, New York, US	
65	Win	51–9–5	Frank Battaglia	PTS	10	Sep 21, 1936	Forbes Field, Pittsburgh, Pennsylvania, US	
64	Win	50–9–5	Ralph Chong	KO	7 (8), 2:17	Sep 8, 1936	Coney Island Velodrome, New York City, New York, US	
63	Win	49–9–5	Johnny Rossi	TKO	5 (10)	Jun 22, 1936	Hickey Park, Millvale, Pennsylvania, US	Stopped on cuts
62	Win	48–9–5	Joey Speigal	TKO	7 (10)	Jun 15, 1936	Hickey Park, Millvale, Pennsylvania, US	
61	Loss	47–9–5	Al Quaill	PTS	10	May 25, 1936	Hickey Park, Millvale, Pennsylvania, US	
60	Win	47–8–5	Anson Green	TKO	8 (10)	Apr 27, 1936	Moose Lodge, Pittsburgh, Pennsylvania, US	
59	Win	46–8–5	Jose Pimental	TKO	4 (8), 1:55	Apr 21, 1936	Broadway Arena, New York City, New York, US	Pimental withdrew because of a fractured thumb
58	Draw	45–8–5	Roscoe Manning	PTS	10	Mar 30, 1936	Laurel Garden, Newark, New Jersey, US	
57	Win	45–8–4	Young Terry	TKO	7 (10)	Mar 9, 1936	Laurel Garden, Newark, New Jersey, US	
56	Win	44–8–4	Mickey Bottone	KO	1 (10), 0:49	Mar 3, 1936	Broadway Arena, New York City, New York, US	
55	Loss	43–8–4	Oscar Rankins	PTS	8	Jan 17, 1936	Madison Square Garden, New York City, New York, US	
54	Win	43–7–4	Jackie Aldare	TKO	7 (10), 2:53	Jan 7, 1936	Broadway Arena, New York City, New York, US	
53	Win	42–7–4	Jack Ennis	TKO	1 (8), 2:53	Dec 20, 1935	Madison Square Garden, New York City, New York, US	
52	Win	41–7–4	Tom Chester	TKO	6 (10)	Nov 19, 1935	Broadway Arena, New York City, New York, US	
51	Loss	40–7–4	Young Terry	PTS	10	Oct 21, 1935	Laurel Garden, Newark, New Jersey, US	
40	Win	40–6–4	Charley Weise	TKO	6 (8)	Oct 8, 1935	Broadway Arena, New York City, New York, US	
49	Win	39–6–4	Ray Miller	TKO	6 (10)	Sep 30, 1935	Laurel Garden, Newark, New Jersey, US	
48	Win	38–6–4	Tony Fisher	PTS	10	Aug 12, 1935	Meadowbrook Field, Newark, New Jersey, US	
47	Win	37–6–4	Al Rossi	KO	4 (8)	Jul 24, 1935	Coney Island Velodrome, New York City, New York, US	
46	Win	36–6–4	Eddie Whalen	KO	1 (10)	Jul 4, 1935	Fort Hamilton Arena, New York City, New York, US	
45	Win	35–6–4	Tony Celli	TKO	2 (10), 1:00	Jun 20, 1935	Fort Hamilton Arena, New York City, New York, US	
44	Win	34–6–4	Ray Acosta	TKO	3 (6), 2:45	Dec 14, 1934	Legion Stadium, Hollywood, California, US	
43	Loss	33–6–4	Swede Berglund	PTS	10	May 18, 1934	Coliseum, San Diego, California, US	
42	Draw	33–5–4	Vincent Sireci	PTS	6	Dec 21, 1933	St. Nicholas Arena, New York City, New York, US	
41	Win	33–5–3	Frank Fullam	PTS	6	Nov 24, 1933	Madison Square Garden, New York City, New York, US	
40	Win	32–5–3	Eddie Whalen	TKO	2 (8), 2:55	Oct 26, 1933	Broadway Arena, New York City, New York, US	
39	Win	31–5–3	Al Diamond	PTS	10	Aug 7, 1933	Dreamland Park, Newark, New Jersey, US	
38	Loss	30–5–3	Al Rossi	PTS	10	Jun 13, 1933	Dreamland Park, Newark, New Jersey, US	
37	Loss	30–4–3	Jackie Aldare	PTS	6	Apr 22, 1933	Ridgewood Grove, New York City, New York, US	
36	Win	30–3–3	Pete Susky	PTS	10	Apr 17, 1933	Laurel Garden, Newark, New Jersey, US	
35	Win	29–3–3	Jay Macedon	TKO	7 (10)	Apr 3, 1933	Laurel Garden, Newark, New Jersey, US	
34	Win	28–3–3	Connie Josenio	KO	2 (5), 1:39	Mar 17, 1933	Madison Square Garden, New York City, New York, US	
33	Win	27–3–3	Larry Marinucci	PTS	6	Mar 4, 1933	Ridgewood Grove, New York City, New York, US	
32	Win	26–3–3	Jimmy Evans	PTS	10	Dec 30, 1932	Legion Stadium, Hollywood, California, US	
31	Win	25–3–3	Ray Acosta	KO	1 (4)	Dec 6, 1932	Olympic Auditorium, Los Angeles, California, US	
30	Win	24–3–3	Red Grigry	PTS	4	Nov 22, 1932	Olympic Auditorium, Los Angeles, California, US	
29	Win	23–3–3	Walter Braun	KO	3 (8)	Jul 28, 1932	Fort Hamilton Arena, New York City, New York, US	
28	Win	22–3–3	George Cherubini	TKO	2 (8)	Jul 7, 1932	Fort Hamilton Arena, New York City, New York, US	
27	Loss	21–3–3	Vince Dundee	TKO	8 (10), 2:46	Oct 16, 1931	Madison Square Garden, New York City, New York, US	Krieger broke his left elbow
26	Draw	21–2–3	My Sullivan	PTS	10	Sep 17, 1931	Madison Square Garden, New York City, New York, US	
25	Win	21–2–2	Hans Müller	PTS	8	Aug 27, 1931	Madison Square Garden, New York City, New York, US	
24	Win	20–2–2	Larry Marinucci	PTS	6	Aug 7, 1931	Golden City Arena, New York City, New York, US	
23	Win	19–2–2	Joey LaGrey	PTS	8	Jul 13, 1931	Starlight Park, New York City, New York, US	
22	Win	18–2–2	Mickey Marino	PTS	8	Jun 24, 1931	Coney Island Stadium, New York City, New York, US	
21	Draw	17–2–2	Joe Gorman	PTS	6	Jun 15, 1931	Madison Square Garden, New York City, New York, US	
20	Win	17–2–1	Grover Mallini	KO	2 (6)	Mar 25, 1931	Rockland Palace, New York City, New York, US	
19	Win	16–2–1	Billy Djalma	TKO	2 (6)	Dec 2, 1930	St. Nicholas Arena, New York City, New York, US	
18	Win	15–2–1	Billy Tosk	PTS	4	Nov 4, 1930	St. Nicholas Arena, New York City, New York, US	
17	Win	14–2–1	Billy Drako	KO	1 (6)	Aug 16, 1930	Long Beach Stadium, Long Beach, New York, US	
16	Loss	13–2–1	Joey LaGrey	PTS	6	May 26, 1930	St. Nicholas Arena, New York City, New York, US	
15	Win	13–1–1	Steve Gotch	KO	3 (8)	May 12, 1930	St. Nicholas Arena, New York City, New York, US	
14	Win	12–1–1	Freddie Kelly	TKO	1 (6)	Apr 21, 1930	St. Nicholas Arena, New York City, New York, US	
13	Win	11–1–1	Marco Appicello	PTS	4	Feb 28, 1930	St. Nicholas Arena, New York City, New York, US	
12	Win	10–1–1	Eddie Forster	TKO	3 (6)	Dec 23, 1929	St. Nicholas Arena, New York City, New York, US	
11	Win	9–1–1	Pete Horton	PTS	6	Dec 2, 1929	St. Nicholas Arena, New York City, New York, US	
10	Win	8–1–1	Willie Young	TKO	2 (4)	Oct 28, 1929	St. Nicholas Arena, New York City, New York, US	
9	Win	7–1–1	Rosen Britto	TKO	3 (4)	Oct 7, 1929	St. Nicholas Arena, New York City, New York, US	
8	Loss	6–1–1	Jose Rodriguez	PTS	6	Aug 15, 1929	Woodcliff Park, Poughkeepsie, New York, US	
7	Win	6–0–1	Joe Gorman	PTS	6	Aug 9, 1929	Long Beach Stadium, Long Beach, New York, US	
6	Win	5–0–1	Eddie McLaughlin	PTS	6	Jul 19, 1929	Long Beach Stadium, Long Beach, New York, US	
5	Draw	4–0–1	Manny Davis	PTS	6	May 13, 1929	St. Nicholas Arena, New York City, New York, US	
4	Win	4–0	Artie Carr	KO	4 (4)	Apr 20, 1929	Olympia Boxing Club, New York City, New York, US	
3	Win	3–0	Duffy Moore	TKO	3 (4)	Mar 11, 1929	Broadway Arena, New York City, New York, US	
2	Win	2–0	Con Cordero	PTS	4	Feb 1, 1929	Madison Square Garden, New York City, New York, US	
1	Win	1–0	Tiger Lee Paige	PTS	4	Dec 22, 1928	Olympia Boxing Club, New York City, New York, US	

== Retirement and life after boxing ==
Krieger retired from boxing in 1941. Not long after his last fight, he ran for City Councilman for the Bensonhurst section of Brooklyn where he lived, but lost the election. He took financial losses from gambling, before investing in a tavern which did not succeed. He later worked for the restaurant Pumpernick's in Miami Beach as a parking attendant. He died in Las Vegas on September 24, 1964.

== Achievements ==
Preceded by Al Hostak	NBA Middleweight Champion; November 1, 1938– June 27, 1939	Succeeded by Al Hostak

== See also ==
- List of select Jewish boxers
