= Freddie Steele =

American boxer (1912–1984)

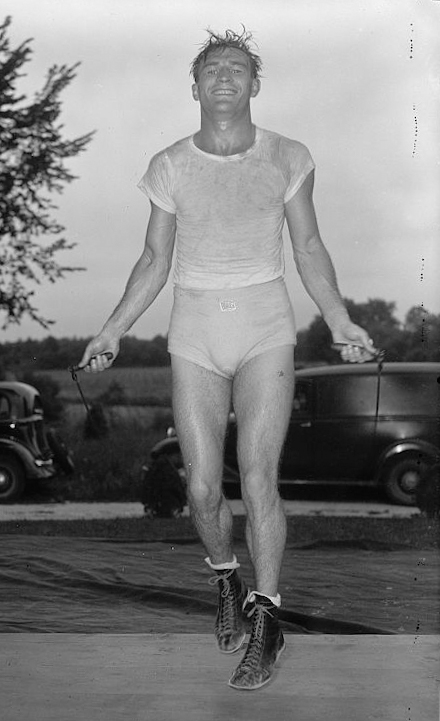

Personal information
- Nickname: Tacoma Assassin
- Nationality: American
- Born: Frederick Earl Burgett; December 18, 1912 Seattle, Washington, U.S.
- Died: August 22, 1984 (aged 71) Aberdeen, Washington, U.S.
- Height: 5 ft 10 in (1.78 m)
- Weight: Middleweight

Boxing career
- Reach: 72 in (183 cm)
- Stance: orthodox

Boxing record
- Total fights: 142
- Wins: 125
- Win by KO: 60
- Losses: 5
- Draws: 11
- No contests: 1

Freddie Steele (December 18, 1912 – August 22, 1984) was a boxer and film actor born Frederick Earle Burgett in Seattle, Washington. He was recognized as the National Boxing Association (NBA) Middleweight Champion of the World between 1936 and 1938. Steele was nicknamed "the Tacoma Assassin" and was trained by Jack Connor, Johnny Babnick; and Ray Arcel while in New York. His managers included George McAllister, Dave Miller, Eddie Miller, and Pete Reilly. He appeared as an actor in a number of Hollywood films in the 1940s, including Preston Sturges's Hail the Conquering Hero.

== Early life ==
Steele was born on December 18, 1912, in Seattle, Washington, to Virginia Cloud Burgett. His mother married Charles E. Steele sometime after his birth. As a youth, he played baseball, but in high school in Tacoma participated in basketball, soccer, football, golf, and swimming.

== Professional career ==
A good boxer and a hard hitter, Steele lost only two fights during his first ten years in the ring. Among those he defeated were Ceferino Garcia, Ralph Chong, Leonard Bennett, Joe Glick, Bucky Lawless, Andy Divodi, Baby Joe Gans, Vince Dundee, Gorilla Jones, Swede Berglund, Young Stuhley, Meyer Grace, Henry Firpo, Eddie "Babe" Risko, Jackie Aldare, Gus Lesnevich, Paul Pirrone, Frank Battaglia, Ken Overlin, Carmen Barth, and Solly Krieger.

=== Taking the World Middleweight Boxing Championship ===
On July 11, 1936, he defeated Babe Risko to take the Middleweight Boxing Championship of the World in a unanimous fifteen round decision at the Civic Stadium in Seattle. Steele floored Risko for seven seconds in the first round. Steele took seven of the fifteen rounds with good margins, with only four going to Risko. Steele damaged both of Risko's eyes during the bout which hampered the reigning champion's ability to defend himself. The Associated Press gave Risko only three rounds of the well attended bout of around 27,000.

==== Defenses of the NBA World Middleweight Boxing Championship ====
On January 1, 1937, Steele defended his NBA World Middleweight Championship against William "Gorilla" Jones, a former champion, in a unanimous ten round decision in Wisconsin. Steele had Jones down for a count of three in the seventh, and won all but one round in his decisive victory before a disappointing crowd of only 3,700.

On February 19, 1937, Risko attempted another shot at the title against Steele at Madison Square Garden but lost in a fifteen-round unanimous decision. The Associated Press gave Steele nine rounds, with five to Risko, and one even. The bout, fought before a crowd of 11,600, was described as tedious by many reporters.

On May 11, 1937, Steele made his third defense of the NBA World Middleweight Title against Frank Battaglia in Seattle, Washington, winning in a third-round knockout. Steele scored knockdowns in both the first and second rounds, before flooring Battaglia with a crushing left 34 seconds into the third round.

He fought two memorable bouts with Fred Apostoli, winning the first, but suffering a TKO in a subsequent non-title match.

=== Losing the World Middleweight Boxing Championship ===
He lost the middleweight crown to Al Hostak in his next to last fight, in a first round knockout of a scheduled fifteen round contest at the Seattle Civic Arena on July 26, 1938. After two light taps from Steele in the first round, Hostak floored his opponent briefly for the first time, and again shortly after for a count of five. Celebrity referee Jack Dempsey, the former heavyweight champion, stopped the fight after Steele arose after his third fall to the mat before a record Seattle crowd of 35,000. After his third fall, Dempsey sent Steele to a neutral corner, and reached a count of seven before stopping the fight after Hostak tried to resume the fight.

After having been knocked down four times, being counted out at by Referee Dempsey, some ringside observers had accused Steele of coming out against Hostak with his hands down, thus getting KO'd in the first round. But Steele had been hampered by a cracked breastbone, which prevented him from lifting his gloves high to where they belonged—according to his chief sparring partner, Davey Ward.

Steele's career had declined after the death of his manager, Dave Miller in 1938 after surgery. Steele lost his next and last fight to Jimmy Casino in 1941. His final record included 125 wins (60 KOs), 5 losses, 11 draws and 1 No Contest.

== Life after boxing ==
Freddie Steele was also known for his footwork, and waist-down shots of his footwork can be seen in the 1942 film Gentleman Jim in which he performed as boxing double for star Errol Flynn.

Steele went on to appear in a number of Hollywood films as an actor throughout the 1940s, notably as "Bugsy", one of the six Marines central to the plot of the Oscar-nominated Hail the Conquering Hero (1944), directed by Preston Sturges. He also appeared as Sergeant Steve Warnicki in The Story of G.I. Joe (1945) and in Whiplash and I Walk Alone (both 1948). He appeared in nearly 30 films, although he was usually uncredited.

He left Hollywood in the 1950s, and returned to the Pacific Northwest. He owned and operated Freddie Steele's Restaurant in Westport, Washington, with his wife, Helen, for over 20 years until illness forced his retirement.

== Death ==
Steele died at a nursing home in Aberdeen, Washington, on August 22, 1984; he had suffered a stroke in 1980. He is interred in the Fern Hill Cemetery, Aberdeen, WA.

== Professional boxing record ==
| 140 fights | 123 wins | 5 losses |
|---|---|---|
| By knockout | 58 | 3 |
| By decision | 65 | 2 |
| Draws | 11 | |
| No contests | 1 | |

| No. | Result | Record | Opponent | Type | Round | Date | Location | Notes |
|---|---|---|---|---|---|---|---|---|
| 140 | Loss | 123–5–11 (1) | Jimmy Casino | TKO | 5 (10) | May 23, 1941 | Legion Stadium, Hollywood, California, U.S. | |
| 139 | Loss | 123–4–11 (1) | Al Hostak | KO | 1 (15) | Jul 26, 1938 | Civic Ice Arena, Seattle, Washington, U.S. | Lost NBA middleweight title |
| 138 | Win | 123–3–11 (1) | Solly Krieger | UD | 10 | Jun 14, 1938 | Civic Ice Arena, Seattle, Washington, U.S. | |
| 137 | Win | 122–3–11 (1) | Carmen Barth | TKO | 7 (15) | Feb 19, 1938 | Public Hall, Cleveland, Ohio, U.S. | Retained NBA, NYSAC middleweight titles; Won vacant The Ring middleweight title |
| 136 | Win | 121–3–11 (1) | Bob Turner | KO | 1 (10) | Feb 8, 1938 | Convention Hall, Rochester, New York, U.S. | |
| 135 | Loss | 120–3–11 (1) | Fred Apostoli | TKO | 9 (12) | Jan 7, 1938 | Madison Square Garden, New York City, New York, U.S. | |
| 134 | Win | 120–2–11 (1) | Ken Overlin | KO | 4 (15) | Sep 11, 1937 | Civic Auditorium, Seattle, Washington, U.S. | Retained NBA and NYSAC middleweight titles |
| 133 | Win | 119–2–11 (1) | Charley Williams | TKO | 8 (10) | Jul 21, 1937 | Griffith Stadium, Washington, D.C., U.S. | |
| 132 | Win | 118–2–11 (1) | Frank Battaglia | KO | 3 (15) | May 11, 1937 | Civic Auditorium, Seattle, Washington, U.S. | Retained NBA and NYSAC middleweight titles |
| 131 | Win | 117–2–11 (1) | Paul Pirrone | TKO | 1 (10) | Mar 2, 1937 | Convention Hall, Philadelphia, Pennsylvania, U.S. | |
| 130 | Win | 116–2–11 (1) | Eddie Babe Risko | UD | 15 | Feb 19, 1937 | Madison Square Garden, New York City, New York, U.S. | Retained NBA and NYSAC middleweight titles |
| 129 | Win | 115–2–11 (1) | Gorilla Jones | UD | 10 | Jan 1, 1937 | Auditorium, Milwaukee, Wisconsin, U.S. | Retained NBA and NYSAC middleweight titles |
| 128 | Win | 114–2–11 (1) | Young Stuhley | PTS | 10 | Dec 8, 1936 | Olympic Auditorium, Los Angeles, California, U.S. | |
| 127 | Win | 113–2–11 (1) | Al Rossi | KO | 1 (10) | Nov 27, 1936 | Coliseum, San Diego, California, U.S. | |
| 126 | Win | 112–2–11 (1) | Gus Lesnevich | TKO | 2 (10) | Nov 17, 1936 | Olympic Auditorium, Los Angeles, California, U.S. | |
| 125 | Win | 111–2–11 (1) | Allen Matthews | UD | 10 | Oct 21, 1936 | Civic Auditorium, Seattle, Washington, U.S. | |
| 124 | Win | 110–2–11 (1) | Young Stuhley | PTS | 10 | Sep 3, 1936 | Armory, Spokane, Washington, U.S. | |
| 123 | Win | 109–2–11 (1) | Jackie Aldare | KO | 2 (10) | Aug 20, 1936 | Greenwich Coliseum, Tacoma, Washington, U.S. | |
| 122 | Win | 108–2–11 (1) | Eddie Babe Risko | UD | 15 | Jul 11, 1936 | Civic Stadium, Seattle, Washington, U.S. | Won NBA and NYSAC middleweight titles |
| 121 | Win | 107–2–11 (1) | Tony Fisher | UD | 10 | Apr 28, 1936 | Civic Ice Arena, Seattle, Washington, U.S. | |
| 120 | Win | 106–2–11 (1) | Eddie Babe Risko | UD | 10 | Mar 24, 1936 | Civic Ice Arena, Seattle, Washington, U.S. | |
| 119 | Win | 105–2–11 (1) | Young Stuhley | PTS | 10 | Feb 25, 1936 | Olympic Auditorium, Los Angeles, California, U.S. | |
| 118 | Win | 104–2–11 (1) | Henry Firpo | KO | 2 (10) | Feb 4, 1936 | Crystal Pool, Seattle, Washington, U.S. | |
| 117 | Win | 103–2–11 (1) | Meyer Grace | KO | 1 (10) | Jan 23, 1936 | Greenwich Coliseum, Tacoma, Washington, U.S. | |
| 116 | Win | 102–2–11 (1) | Young Stuhley | PTS | 10 | Nov 19, 1935 | Civic Auditorium, Seattle, Washington, U.S. | |
| 115 | Win | 101–2–11 (1) | Mike Payan | TKO | 5 (10) | Oct 25, 1935 | Coliseum, San Diego, California, U.S. | |
| 114 | Win | 100–2–11 (1) | Swede Berglund | TKO | 6 (10) | Oct 18, 1935 | Legion Stadium, Hollywood, California, U.S. | |
| 113 | Win | 99–2–11 (1) | Gorilla Jones | UD | 10 | Sep 17, 1935 | Civic Ice Arena, Seattle, Washington, U.S. | |
| 112 | Win | 98–2–11 (1) | Vince Dundee | TKO | 3 (10) | Jul 30, 1935 | Civic Ice Arena, Seattle, Washington, U.S. | |
| 111 | Win | 97–2–11 (1) | Al Rossi | TKO | 2 (10) | Jun 11, 1935 | Civic Ice Arena, Seattle, Washington, U.S. | |
| 110 | Win | 96–2–11 (1) | Mike Payan | PTS | 10 | May 16, 1935 | Greenwich Coliseum, Tacoma, Washington, U.S. | |
| 109 | Win | 95–2–11 (1) | Sammy O'Dell | KO | 1 (10) | Apr 23, 1935 | Civic Auditorium, Seattle, Washington, U.S. | |
| 108 | Win | 94–2–11 (1) | Fred Apostoli | TKO | 10 (10) | Apr 1, 1935 | Civic Auditorium, San Francisco, California, U.S. | |
| 107 | Win | 93–2–11 (1) | Indian Jimmy Rivers | KO | 9 (10) | Feb 21, 1935 | Greenwich Coliseum, Tacoma, Washington, U.S. | |
| 106 | Win | 92–2–11 (1) | Indian Jimmy Rivers | TKO | 5 (10) | Feb 12, 1935 | Auditorium, Portland, Oregon, U.S. | |
| 105 | Win | 91–2–11 (1) | Baby Joe Gans | KO | 3 (10) | Jan 24, 1935 | Greenwich Coliseum, Tacoma, Washington, U.S. | |
| 104 | Win | 90–2–11 (1) | Tommy Rios | PTS | 10 | Jan 10, 1935 | Greenwich Coliseum, Tacoma, Washington, U.S. | |
| 103 | Win | 89–2–11 (1) | Andy DiVodi | KO | 6 (10) | Dec 20, 1934 | Greenwich Coliseum, Tacoma, Washington, U.S. | |
| 102 | Win | 88–2–11 (1) | Jack Hibbard | TKO | 4 (10) | Dec 5, 1934 | Walla Walla, Washington, U.S. | |
| 101 | Win | 87–2–11 (1) | Jimmy Evans | TKO | 4 (10) | Nov 13, 1934 | Crystal Pool, Seattle, Washington, U.S. | |
| 100 | Win | 86–2–11 (1) | Andy DiVodi | PTS | 10 | Nov 1, 1934 | Greenwich Coliseum, Tacoma, Washington, U.S. | |
| 99 | Win | 85–2–11 (1) | Joe Glick | KO | 1 (10) | Oct 26, 1934 | Armory, Yakima, Washington, U.S. | |
| 98 | Win | 84–2–11 (1) | Bucky Lawless | TKO | 2 (10) | Jun 29, 1934 | Civic Ice Arena, Seattle, Washington, U.S. | |
| 97 | NC | 83–2–11 (1) | Sammy Slaughter | NC | 1 (10) | Jun 22, 1934 | Dreamland Auditorium, San Francisco, California, U.S. | Referee Toby Irwin chased the boxers from the ring after Slaughter had fallen ten times in less than two minutes, eight times without being hit. |
| 96 | Win | 83–2–11 | Babe Marino | PTS | 10 | Jun 8, 1934 | Dreamland Auditorium, San Francisco, California, U.S. | |
| 95 | Draw | 82–2–11 | Gorilla Jones | PTS | 10 | May 22, 1934 | Civic Ice Arena, Seattle, Washington, U.S. | |
| 94 | Win | 82–2–10 | Joe Cardoza | KO | 2 (10) | Apr 26, 1934 | Greenwich Coliseum, Tacoma, Washington, U.S. | |
| 93 | Win | 81–2–10 | Eddie Murdock | KO | 4 (10) | Apr 10, 1934 | Civic Ice Arena, Seattle, Washington, U.S. | |
| 92 | Win | 80–2–10 | Vivencio Alicante | KO | 2 (10) | Mar 8, 1934 | Greenwich Coliseum, Tacoma, Washington, U.S. | |
| 91 | Win | 79–2–10 | Johnny Romero | KO | 2 (8) | Feb 27, 1934 | Crystal Pool, Seattle, Washington, U.S. | |
| 90 | Win | 78–2–10 | Leonard Bennett | PTS | 8 | Feb 15, 1934 | Greenwich Coliseum, Tacoma, Washington, U.S. | |
| 89 | Win | 77–2–10 | Petey Mike | PTS | 10 | Oct 12, 1933 | Greenwich Coliseum, Tacoma, Washington, U.S. | |
| 88 | Win | 76–2–10 | Frankie Petrolle | KO | 3 (10) | Aug 8, 1933 | Civic Ice Arena, Seattle, Washington, U.S. | |
| 87 | Win | 75–2–10 | Eddie Ran | PTS | 6 | Jun 27, 1933 | Civic Ice Arena, Seattle, Washington, U.S. | |
| 86 | Win | 74–2–10 | Joe Glick | PTS | 8 | Jun 22, 1933 | Natatorium Park, Spokane, Washington, U.S. | |
| 85 | Win | 73–2–10 | Alvin Lewis | KO | 3 (6) | Jun 6, 1933 | Civic Ice Arena, Seattle, Washington, U.S. | |
| 84 | Win | 72–2–10 | Tiger Lee Paige | PTS | 6 | Jun 1, 1933 | Greenwich Coliseum, Tacoma, Washington, U.S. | |
| 83 | Win | 71–2–10 | Gilbert Attell | KO | 3 (6) | May 18, 1933 | Greenwich Coliseum, Tacoma, Washington, U.S. | |
| 82 | Win | 70–2–10 | Leonard Bennett | PTS | 6 | Jan 17, 1933 | Crystal Pool, Seattle, Washington, U.S. | Retained Pacific Northwest welterweight title |
| 81 | Win | 69–2–10 | Battling Dozier | PTS | 6 | Nov 17, 1932 | Greenwich Coliseum, Tacoma, Washington, U.S. | |
| 80 | Win | 68–2–10 | Millio Millitti | PTS | 6 | Nov 3, 1932 | Greenwich Coliseum, Tacoma, Washington, U.S. | |
| 79 | Win | 67–2–10 | Tommy Herman | PTS | 6 | Oct 26, 1932 | Crystal Pool, Seattle, Washington, U.S. | |
| 78 | Loss | 66–2–10 | Tommy Herman | PTS | 4 | Sep 27, 1932 | Olympic Auditorium, Los Angeles, California, U.S. | |
| 77 | Win | 66–1–10 | Ceferino Garcia | KO | 2 (4) | Sep 20, 1932 | Olympic Auditorium, Los Angeles, California, U.S. | |
| 76 | Win | 65–1–10 | David Velasco | PTS | 6 | Sep 7, 1932 | Civic Ice Arena, Seattle, Washington, U.S. | |
| 75 | Win | 64–1–10 | Billy Townsend | PTS | 6 | Aug 26, 1932 | Civic Ice Arena, Seattle, Washington, U.S. | |
| 74 | Win | 63–1–10 | Alfonso Gonzales | PTS | 6 | Aug 11, 1932 | Greenwich Coliseum, Tacoma, Washington, U.S. | |
| 73 | Win | 62–1–10 | Tiger Lee Paige | PTS | 6 | Aug 3, 1932 | Gonzaga Stadium, Spokane, Washington, U.S. | |
| 72 | Win | 61–1–10 | Ralph Chong | TKO | 6 (6) | Jul 20, 1932 | Civic Ice Arena, Seattle, Washington, U.S. | |
| 71 | Win | 60–1–10 | Larry Murphy | PTS | 6 | Jun 30, 1932 | Arena, Dishman, Washington, U.S. | |
| 70 | Win | 59–1–10 | Alfonso Gonzales | PTS | 6 | Jun 1, 1932 | Civic Ice Arena, Seattle, Washington, U.S. | |
| 69 | Win | 58–1–10 | Frankie Stetson | PTS | 6 | May 24, 1932 | Auditorium, Portland, Oregon, U.S. | |
| 68 | Win | 57–1–10 | Ceferino Garcia | KO | 2 (6) | May 18, 1932 | Civic Ice Arena, Seattle, Washington, U.S. | |
| 67 | Win | 56–1–10 | Tony Portillo | PTS | 6 | Apr 27, 1932 | Civic Ice Arena, Seattle, Washington, U.S. | Won vacant Pacific Northwest welterweight title |
| 66 | Win | 55–1–10 | Bobby Vincent | PTS | 6 | Apr 7, 1932 | Greenwich Coliseum, Tacoma, Washington, U.S. | |
| 65 | Win | 54–1–10 | Matt Calo | PTS | 6 | Mar 24, 1932 | Greenwich Coliseum, Tacoma, Washington, U.S. | |
| 64 | Win | 53–1–10 | Tiger Lee Paige | PTS | 6 | Mar 16, 1932 | Civic Ice Arena, Seattle, Washington, U.S. | |
| 63 | Win | 52–1–10 | Freddie Goldstein | PTS | 6 | Mar 3, 1932 | Greenwich Coliseum, Tacoma, Washington, U.S. | |
| 62 | Win | 51–1–10 | Matt Calo | PTS | 6 | Nov 30, 1931 | Greenwich Coliseum, Tacoma, Washington, U.S. | |
| 61 | Win | 50–1–10 | Cowboy Sammy Evans | PTS | 6 | Sep 23, 1931 | Civic Ice Arena, Seattle, Washington, U.S. | |
| 60 | Win | 49–1–10 | Johnny Woods | TKO | 3 (6) | Aug 20, 1931 | Arena, Dishman, Washington, U.S. | |
| 59 | Win | 48–1–10 | Don Fraser | PTS | 6 | Jul 30, 1931 | Arena, Dishman, Washington, U.S. | |
| 58 | Win | 47–1–10 | Al Gracio | TKO | 3 (6) | Jul 16, 1931 | Arena, Dishman, Washington, U.S. | |
| 57 | Win | 46–1–10 | Jimmy Owens | UD | 6 | Jun 10, 1931 | Civic Ice Arena, Seattle, Washington, U.S. | |
| 56 | Win | 45–1–10 | Jimmy Owens | UD | 6 | May 27, 1931 | Civic Ice Arena, Seattle, Washington, U.S. | |
| 55 | Win | 44–1–10 | Joe Townsend | KO | 2 (6) | May 13, 1931 | Civic Ice Arena, Seattle, Washington, U.S. | |
| 54 | Win | 43–1–10 | Esten Hunter | PTS | 6 | May 7, 1931 | Greenwich Coliseum, Tacoma, Washington, U.S. | |
| 53 | Win | 42–1–10 | Teddy Palacios | KO | 1 (6) | Apr 22, 1931 | Civic Ice Arena, Seattle, Washington, U.S. | |
| 52 | Win | 41–1–10 | Ritchie King | KO | 1 (6) | Apr 16, 1931 | Greenwich Coliseum, Tacoma, Washington, U.S. | |
| 51 | Win | 40–1–10 | Nels Ferguson | TKO | 2 (6) | Apr 8, 1931 | Civic Ice Arena, Seattle, Washington, U.S. | |
| 50 | Win | 39–1–10 | Nels Ferguson | PTS | 6 | Mar 26, 1931 | Greenwich Coliseum, Tacoma, Washington, U.S. | |
| 49 | Win | 38–1–10 | Mickey Cochrane | KO | 2 (6) | Mar 6, 1931 | Knights of Columbus Gym, Yakima, Washington, U.S. | |
| 48 | Draw | 37–1–10 | Joe Townsend | PTS | 6 | Feb 18, 1931 | Crystal Pool, Seattle, Washington, U.S. | |
| 47 | Win | 37–1–9 | Mickey Trad | PTS | 6 | Feb 12, 1931 | Greenwich Coliseum, Tacoma, Washington, U.S. | |
| 46 | Win | 36–1–9 | Tony Portillo | PTS | 6 | Jan 1, 1931 | Greenwich Coliseum, Tacoma, Washington, U.S. | |
| 45 | Loss | 35–1–9 | Tony Portillo | PTS | 6 | Dec 17, 1930 | Crystal Pool, Seattle, Washington, U.S. | |
| 44 | Draw | 35–0–9 | Tony Portillo | PTS | 6 | Dec 11, 1930 | Greenwich Coliseum, Tacoma, Washington, U.S. | |
| 43 | Win | 35–0–8 | Joey Coffman | PTS | 6 | Oct 30, 1930 | Greenwich Coliseum, Tacoma, Washington, U.S. | |
| 42 | Win | 34–0–8 | Al Gracio | TKO | 1 (6) | Oct 16, 1930 | Greenwich Coliseum, Tacoma, Washington, U.S. | |
| 41 | Win | 33–0–8 | Leslie Carter | TKO | 5 (6) | Oct 2, 1930 | Greenwich Coliseum, Tacoma, Washington, U.S. | |
| 40 | Win | 32–0–8 | Jimmy Farrar | TKO | 3 (6) | Sep 11, 1930 | Civic Ice Arena, Seattle, Washington, U.S. | |
| 39 | Win | 31–0–8 | Tommy Fielding | PTS | 6 | Jul 10, 1930 | Greenwich Coliseum, Tacoma, Washington, U.S. | |
| 38 | Win | 30–0–8 | Tommy Fielding | PTS | 6 | Jun 26, 1930 | Greenwich Coliseum, Tacoma, Washington, U.S. | |
| 37 | Win | 29–0–8 | Joe Townsend | PTS | 6 | May 22, 1930 | Greenwich Coliseum, Tacoma, Washington, U.S. | |
| 36 | Win | 28–0–8 | Joe Townsend | PTS | 6 | May 8, 1930 | Greenwich Coliseum, Tacoma, Washington, U.S. | |
| 35 | Draw | 27–0–8 | Joe Townsend | PTS | 6 | Apr 25, 1930 | Civic Ice Arena, Seattle, Washington, U.S. | |
| 34 | Draw | 27–0–7 | Jimmy Britt | PTS | 6 | Mar 6, 1930 | Greenwich Coliseum, Tacoma, Washington, U.S. | |
| 33 | Win | 27–0–6 | Jack Red Rondeaux | KO | 4 (6) | Feb 27, 1930 | Greenwich Coliseum, Tacoma, Washington, U.S. | |
| 32 | Win | 26–0–6 | Jack Nash | KO | 2 (6) | Jan 23, 1930 | Greenwich Coliseum, Tacoma, Washington, U.S. | |
| 31 | Win | 25–0–6 | Frankie Monroe | PTS | 6 | Jan 9, 1930 | Greenwich Coliseum, Tacoma, Washington, U.S. | |
| 30 | Win | 24–0–6 | Jimmy Pavolic | PTS | 6 | Dec 19, 1929 | Greenwich Coliseum, Tacoma, Washington, U.S. | |
| 29 | Win | 23–0–6 | Paddy Ryan | KO | 1 (4) | Nov 21, 1929 | Greenwich Coliseum, Tacoma, Washington, U.S. | |
| 28 | Win | 22–0–6 | Harry Davis | TKO | 2 (4) | Nov 14, 1929 | Greenwich Coliseum, Tacoma, Washington, U.S. | |
| 27 | Win | 21–0–6 | Johnny Lussier | PTS | 4 | Oct 8, 1929 | Northwest A.C., Tacoma, Washington, U.S. | |
| 26 | Win | 20–0–6 | Honey Melody | KO | 3 (?) | Oct 1, 1929 | Northwest A.C., Tacoma, Washington, U.S. | |
| 25 | Win | 19–0–6 | Arnold Smith | KO | 1 (4) | Aug 5, 1929 | Greenwich Coliseum, Tacoma, Washington, U.S. | |
| 24 | Win | 18–0–6 | Ralph Smith | PTS | 4 | Jun 27, 1929 | Greenwich Coliseum, Tacoma, Washington, U.S. | |
| 23 | Win | 17–0–6 | Eddie Foster | KO | 2 (4) | May 9, 1929 | Greenwich Coliseum, Tacoma, Washington, U.S. | |
| 22 | Win | 16–0–6 | Floyd Soldier Brown | PTS | 4 | Apr 1, 1929 | Tacoma, Washington, U.S. | Uncertain of date |
| 21 | Win | 15–0–6 | Len Lockren | PTS | 4 | Mar 15, 1929 | Tacoma, Washington, U.S. | Uncertain of date |
| 20 | Draw | 14–0–6 | Len Lockren | PTS | 4 | Mar 1, 1929 | Tacoma, Washington, U.S. | Uncertain of date |
| 19 | Draw | 14–0–5 | Jimmy Pavolic | PTS | 4 | Jan 1, 1929 | Greenwich Coliseum, Tacoma, Washington, U.S. | |
| 18 | Win | 14–0–4 | Johnny Leonard | PTS | 4 | Nov 22, 1928 | Greenwich Coliseum, Tacoma, Washington, U.S. | |
| 17 | Win | 13–0–4 | Eddie Harmon | KO | 2 (?) | Oct 1, 1928 | Tacoma, Washington, U.S. | |
| 16 | Win | 12–0–4 | Ralph Smith | PTS | 4 | Sep 20, 1928 | Greenwich Coliseum, Tacoma, Washington, U.S. | |
| 15 | Win | 11–0–4 | Jimmy Warfield | KO | 1 (?) | Sep 1, 1928 | Tacoma, Washington, U.S. | |
| 14 | Draw | 10–0–4 | Larry Hannon | PTS | 4 | Aug 10, 1928 | Skating Rink, Centralia, Washington, U.S. | |
| 13 | Win | 10–0–3 | Harry Ketchel | KO | 2 (?) | Jul 4, 1928 | Chehalis, Washington, U.S. | |
| 12 | Draw | 9–0–3 | Eddie Harmon | PTS | 4 | Jun 12, 1928 | Chehalis, Washington, U.S. | |
| 11 | Win | 9–0–2 | Young Tex Vernon | PTS | 6 | May 18, 1928 | Legion Hall, Olympia, Washington, U.S. | |
| 10 | Win | 8–0–2 | Billy Quilter | KO | 2 (4) | May 3, 1928 | Greenwich Coliseum, Tacoma, Washington, U.S. | |
| 9 | Win | 7–0–2 | Bud Weaver | TKO | 4 (4) | Mar 15, 1928 | Greenwich Coliseum, Tacoma, Washington, U.S. | |
| 8 | Win | 6–0–2 | Billy Edwards | KO | 4 (4) | Mar 1, 1928 | Greenwich Coliseum, Tacoma, Washington, U.S. | |
| 7 | Win | 5–0–2 | Hermosa Villa | PTS | 4 | Jan 12, 1928 | Greenwich Coliseum, Tacoma, Washington, U.S. | |
| 6 | Win | 4–0–2 | Nick Vonda | PTS | 4 | Apr 27, 1927 | Liberty Hall, Bellingham, Washington, U.S. | |
| 5 | Draw | 3–0–2 | Jimmy Britt | PTS | 4 | Mar 16, 1927 | Liberty Hall, Bellingham, Washington, U.S. | |
| 4 | Win | 3–0–1 | George Wilson | PTS | 4 | Jan 5, 1927 | Liberty Hall, Bellingham, Washington, U.S. | |
| 3 | Win | 2–0–1 | Mocus Canning | PTS | 4 | Dec 8, 1926 | Liberty Hall, Bellingham, Washington, U.S. | |
| 2 | Draw | 1–0–1 | Jimmy Britt | PTS | 4 | Nov 24, 1926 | Liberty Hall, Bellingham, Washington, U.S. | |
| 1 | Win | 1–0 | Jimmy Britt | PTS | 4 | Nov 10, 1926 | Liberty Hall, Bellingham, Washington, U.S. | |

== Titles in boxing ==
=== Major world titles ===
- NYSAC middleweight champion (160 lbs)
- NBA (WBA) middleweight champion (160 lbs)

=== The Ring magazine titles ===
- The Ring middleweight champion (160 lbs)

=== Regional/International titles ===
- Pacific Northwest welterweight champion (147 lbs)

=== Undisputed titles ===
- Undisputed middleweight champion

== Honors ==
Freddie Steele is an honored member of both the International Boxing Hall of Fame (1999) and the World Boxing Hall of Fame. He was one of the three original inductees into the Tacoma-Pierce County Sports Hall of Fame when it opened in 1957.

Achievements
| Preceded by Eddie (Babe) Risko | NBA World Middleweight Champion; 11 July 1936 – 26 July 1938 | Succeeded by Al Hostak |
| Preceded by Eddie (Babe) Risko | NYSAC World Middleweight Champion; 11 July 1936 – February 1938; Recognition withdrawn | Vacant Title next held by Fred Apostoli |
| Vacant Title last held by Marcel Thil | The Ring Middleweight Champion; September 23, 1937 – 1938; Stripped | Vacant Title next held by Tony Zale |
