= Frank Battaglia (boxer) =

Canadian boxer (1910–1971)

Frank Battaglia (September 13, 1910 – December 17, 1971) was a Canadian boxer. He was born in Winnipeg, Manitoba. He competed in the men's lightweight event at the 1928 Summer Olympics.

As a young teenager, Battaglia was attracted to boxing following a chance meeting with then World Heavyweight Champion Jack Dempsey at the Fort Garry Hotel.

As an amateur boxer, he represented Canada as a lightweight at the 1928 Amsterdam Olympic Games. He lost on points to Robert Charles Smith of South Africa.

As a professional boxer, he compiled a record of 82 wins (KO 59) + 18 losses (KO 3) + 6 draws = 106. On January 13, 1933, in Madison Square Garden New York, Battaglia fought Ben Jeby for the World Middleweight Championship. Battaglia lost to Jeby in the 12th round by KO. On May 11, 1937, in Seattle, Washington Civic Auditorium, Battaglia fought Freddie Steele for the World Middleweight Championship. Battaglia lost to Steele in the 3rd round by KO.

After his boxing career ended, Battaglia became a dog breeder in Minnesota, and later owned a farm in Wisconsin.
