= Ray Arcel =

American boxing trainer (1899–1994)

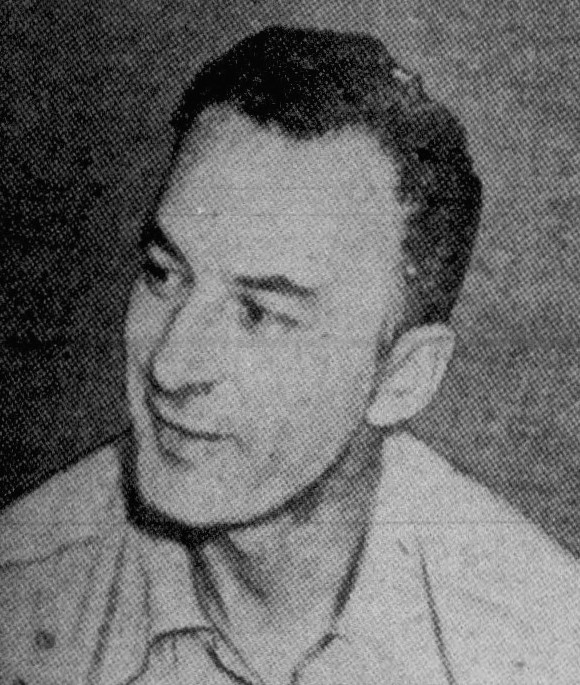
- Arcel at 43, circa 1942
- Born: 30 August 1899; Terre Haute, Indiana, U.S.
- Died: 7 March 1994 (aged 94); New York City, New York, U.S.
- Occupation: boxing trainer
- Years active: 1920s–1950s, 1970s–1980s
- Spouse(s): Hazel Doughlas; Stephanie Arcel

Ramil "Ray" Arcel (August 30, 1899 – March 7, 1994) was an American boxing trainer who was active from the 1920s through the 1980s. In his long and distinguished career, he trained 20 world boxing champions.

== Life and career ==
Arcel was born in Terre Haute, Indiana, the son of Rose (Wachsman) and David Arcel. His parents were Jewish immigrants from Russia and Romania. He moved to New York City before he was six years old, where he grew up in Harlem and graduated from Stuyvesant High School in 1917. He began training fighters at Stillman's Gym, near the old location of Madison Square Garden on 8th Avenue, in the 1920s. The champions he trained included Benny Leonard, Ezzard Charles, Jim Braddock, Barney Ross, Bob Olin, Tony Zale, Billy Soose, Ceferino Garcia, Lou Brouillard, Teddy Yarosz, Freddie Steele, Jackie Kid Berg, Alfonso Frazier, Abe Goldstein, Frankie Genaro, Tony Marino, Sixto Escobar, Charley Phil Rosenberg, Roberto Durán and Larry Holmes.

After some disputes with Jim Norris and the International Boxing Club of New York in the 1950s, Arcel retired from training, after being injured with a lead pipe during an attack in Boston, in a case that was never solved by police, returning in the 1970s to work with Alfonso Frazier and Roberto Durán. After Durán quit in his second fight against Sugar Ray Leonard, Arcel helped prepare Larry Holmes for his fight against Gerry Cooney. He retired from training after that fight, having returned to Durán's corner in January 1982 for Durán's fight against Wilfred Benítez.

In 1926, Arcel married Hazel Douglas. The marriage was her second. Ray and Hazel adopted a daughter Adele Arcel Bloch, who died on February 8, 1990. His second wife and widow was Stephanie Arcel. Ray Arcel died on March 7, 1994, at the age of 94. Stephanie died on August 8, 2014.

Actor Robert De Niro portrayed Arcel in the 2016 film Hands of Stone, about Roberto Durán, with actress Ellen Barkin portraying his wife Stephanie.
