= Tony Zale =

American boxer (1913–1997)

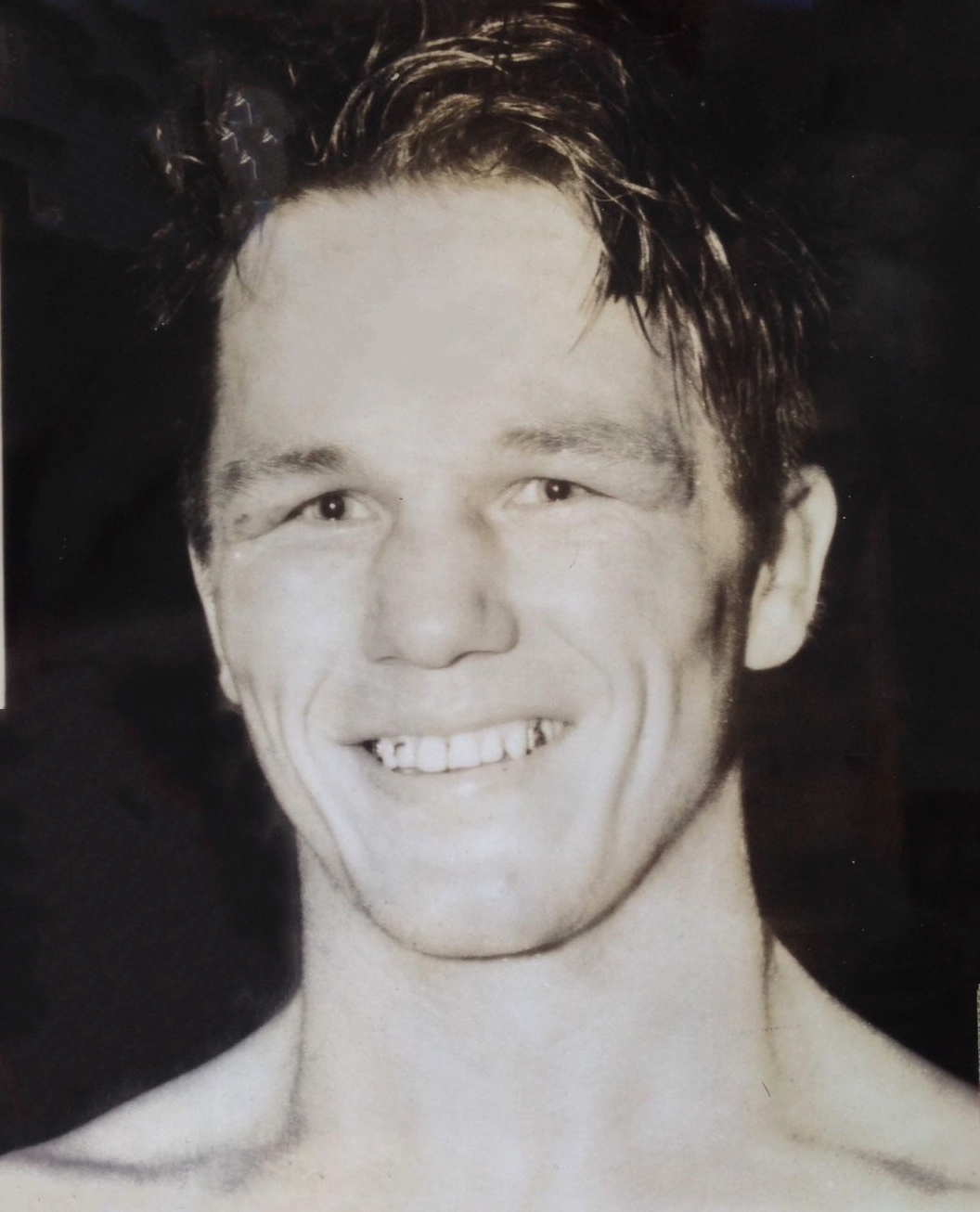
- Zale in 1940

Personal information
- Nickname: Man of Steel
- Nationality: American
- Born: Anthony Florian Zaleski; May 29, 1913 Gary, Indiana, U.S.
- Died: March 20, 1997 (aged 83)
- Height: 5 ft 7 1/2 in (1.71 m)
- Weight: Middleweight

Boxing career
- Reach: 69 in (175 cm)
- Stance: Orthodox

Boxing record
- Total fights: 87
- Wins: 67
- Win by KO: 45
- Losses: 18
- Draws: 2

Anthony Florian Zaleski (May 29, 1913 – March 20, 1997), known professionally as Tony Zale, was an American boxer of Polish descent. Zale was born and raised in Gary, Indiana, a steel town, which gave him his nickname, "Man of Steel", reinforced by his reputation of being able to take fearsome punishment and still rally to win. Zale, who held the world middleweight title multiple times, was known as a crafty boxer and punishing body puncher who wore his opponents down before knocking them out. In 1990, Zale was awarded the Presidential Citizens Medal by President George. H. W. Bush.

The 1941 bout between Zale and Billy Pryor at Juneau Park, Milwaukee, attracted 135,132 spectators, a figure that remains the highest attendance in boxing history.

== World middleweight title ==
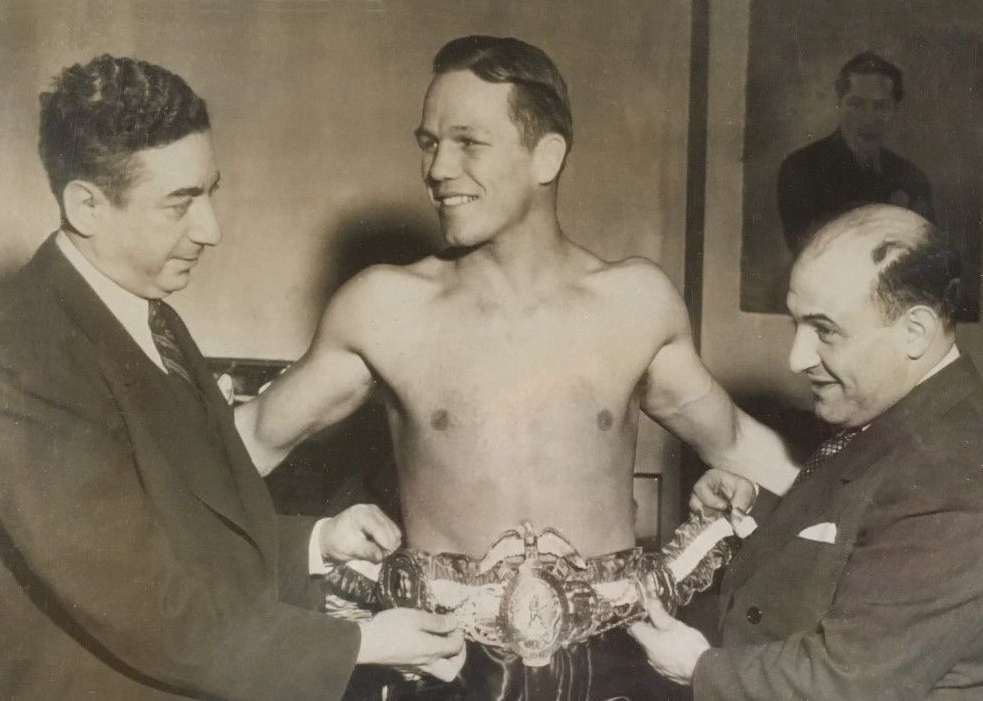
Tony Zale in 1941

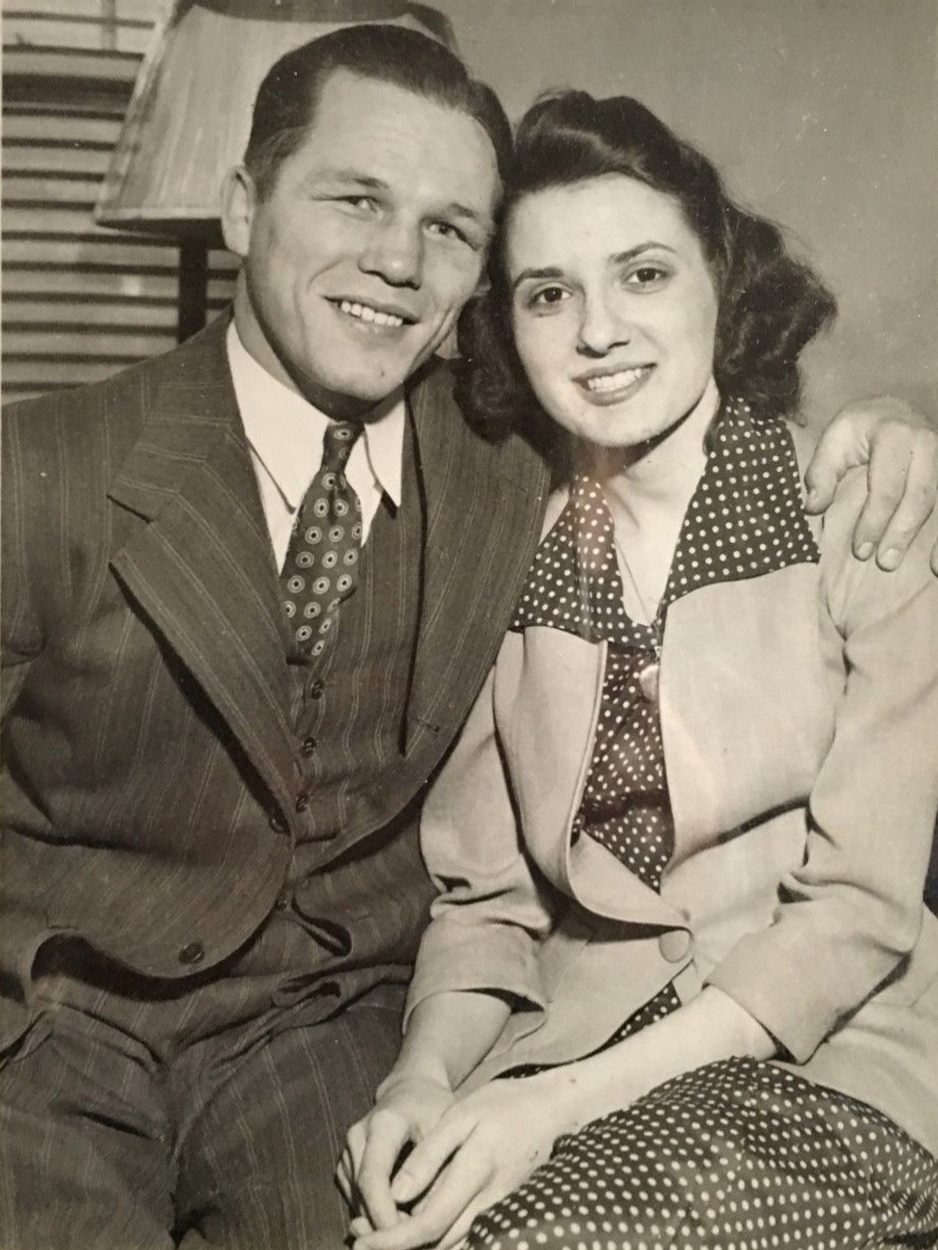
Zale married Adeline Richwalski, in March 1942

Zale met Georgie Abrams in Madison Square Garden in a world middleweight championship match on November 28, 1941, before a crowd of nearly 10,000. Despite knocking Zale down in the first round, a poke in the eye from Zale's glove left him with pain and blurred vision. From the fourth round on, Abrams fought with his left eye nearly closed. Blood from a cut opened above his right eye in the third from an accidental head butt from Zale caused additional vision problems from blood that dripped from the wound. Despite fighting half blind, Abrams fought courageously for fifteen rounds. Abrams lost in a close match, due to the incessant body attacks of Zale in the late rounds, particularly the ninth where he received a severe two handed attack to the midsection. The Associated Press judged Abrams the winner with eight rounds to Zale's seven.

== Bouts against Rocky Graziano, 1946–48 ==
Zale was a two-time world middleweight champion and made The Ring's list of 100 greatest punchers of all time. Zale is best remembered for his three bouts over a 21-month period with Rocky Graziano for the middleweight crown. These three bouts were among the most brutal and exciting middleweight championship matches of all time. The first match took place in Yankee Stadium, New York City. Zale had served in World War II, was thirty-three years old, and had been inactive for about four years. Graziano was on a winning knockout streak and seemed to be in his prime. In their first match (September 27, 1946), after flooring Graziano in the first round, Zale took a savage beating from Graziano, and was on the verge of losing the fight by TKO. However, he rallied and knocked out Graziano in the sixth round to retain his title. The rematch, a year later in Chicago (July 16, 1947), was a mirror image of their first fight. Graziano was battered around the ring, suffered a closed eye and appeared ready to lose by a knockout, then rallied and knocked Zale out in the sixth round, becoming middleweight champion of the world.

Their last fight was held in New Jersey the following year (June 10, 1948). Zale regained his crown, winning the match by a knockout in the third round. The knockout blows consisted of a perfect combination of a right to Graziano's body, then a left hook to Graziano's jaw. Graziano was knocked unconscious. This fight was Zale's last hurrah. His age and the many ring wars he fought seemed to catch up with him in his next fight against European Champion Marcel Cerdan later that year, who stopped him in the eleventh round to win the middleweight championship of the world (September 21, 1948). Graziano commented that years later he would wake up in a cold sweat having had the recurring nightmare of being back in the ring with Zale, who he said really was a man of steel.

Edith Piaf, who at the time was having an affair with Cerdan, was in the audience, praying to Saint Therese for his victory. Two of the three Graziano fights and the Cerdan fight were named The Ring magazine Fight of the Year.

Zale was a 1991 inductee to the International Boxing Hall of Fame (IBHOF). In November 2015, his championship belts were stolen from the IBHOF. The belts were on loan from Zale's family, and have yet to be returned.

Zale was originally cast to play himself in the movie Somebody Up There Likes Me. According to director Robert Wise, Paul Newman (playing Graziano) was hesitant to fully engage Zale during rehearsal, fearing that Zale might reflexively knock him out if Newman inadvertently hit him too hard. As Newman had to appear aggressive against Zale in the film, Wise felt it was necessary to replace Zale with actor Courtland Shepard for the final fight scene.

== Professional boxing record ==
87 fights	67 wins	18 losses
By knockout	45	5
By decision	22	13
Draws	2	

No.	Result	Record	Opponent	Type	Round	Date	Location	Notes
87	Loss	67–18–2	Marcel Cerdan	RTD	11 (15)	Sep 21, 1948	Roosevelt Stadium, Jersey City, New Jersey, U.S.	Lost NYSAC, NBA, and The Ring middleweight titles
86	Win	67–17–2	Rocky Graziano	KO	3 (15)	Jun 10, 1948	Ruppert Stadium, Newark, New Jersey, U.S.	Won NBA and The Ring middleweight titles
85	Win	66–17–2	Lou Woods	KO	3 (10)	Mar 19, 1948	Arena, Toledo, Ohio, U.S.	
84	Win	65–17–2	Bobby Claus	TKO	4 (10)	Mar 8, 1948	Little Rock, Arkansas, U.S.	
83	Win	64–17–2	Al Turner	KO	5 (10)	Jan 23, 1948	Armory, Grand Rapids, Michigan, U.S.	
82	Loss	63–17–2	Rocky Graziano	TKO	6 (15)	Jul 16, 1947	Chicago Stadium, Chicago, Illinois, U.S.	Lost NBA and The Ring middleweight titles
81	Win	63–16–2	Cliff Beckett	TKO	6 (10)	May 8, 1947	Arena, Youngstown, Ohio, U.S.	
80	Win	62–16–2	Al Timmons	TKO	5 (10)	Apr 1, 1947	Memorial Hall, Kansas City, Kansas, U.S.	
79	Win	61–16–2	Tommy Charles	KO	4 (10)	Mar 20, 1947	Ellis Auditorium, Memphis, Tennessee, U.S.	
78	Win	60–16–2	Len Wadsworth	KO	3 (10)	Feb 12, 1947	Forum, Wichita, Kansas, U.S.	
77	Win	59–16–2	Deacon Logan	TKO	6 (10)	Feb 3, 1947	Auditorium, Omaha, Nebraska, U.S.	
76	Win	58–16–2	Rocky Graziano	KO	6 (15)	Sep 27, 1946	Yankee Stadium, New York City, New York, U.S.	Retained NYSAC, NBA, and The Ring middleweight titles
75	Win	57–16–2	Eddie Rossi	KO	4 (10)	May 2, 1946	Auditorium, Memphis, Tennessee, U.S.	
74	Win	56–16–2	Ira Hughes	KO	2 (10)	Apr 12, 1946	City Auditorium, Omaha, Nebraska, U.S.	
73	Win	55–16–2	Bobby Claus	KO	4 (10)	Feb 26, 1946	Houston, Texas, U.S.	
72	Win	54–16–2	Oscar Boyd	KO	3 (10)	Feb 7, 1946	Coliseum, Des Moines, Iowa, U.S.	
71	Win	53–16–2	Tony Gillo	KO	5 (10)	Jan 17, 1946	Municipal Auditorium, Norfolk, New Jersey, U.S.	
70	Win	52–16–2	Bobby Giles	KO	4 (10)	Jan 7, 1946	Municipal Auditorium, Kansas City, U.S.	
69	Loss	51–16–2	Billy Conn	UD	12	Feb 13, 1942	Madison Square Garden, New York City, New York, U.S.	
68	Win	51–15–2	Georgie Abrams	UD	15	Nov 28, 1941	Madison Square Garden, New York City, New York, U.S.	Retained NBA middleweight title; Won vacant NYSAC and The Ring middleweight titles
67	Win	50–15–2	Billy Pryor	KO	9 (10)	Aug 16, 1941	Juneau Park, Milwaukee, Wisconsin, U.S.	
66	Win	49–15–2	Ossie Harris	KO	1 (10)	Jul 23, 1941	Chicago Stadium Outdoor Arena, Chicago, Illinois, U.S.	
65	Win	48–15–2	Al Hostak	KO	2 (15)	May 28, 1941	Chicago Stadium Outdoor Arena, Chicago, Illinois, U.S.	Retained NBA middleweight title
64	Win	47–15–2	Steve Mamakos	KO	14 (15)	Feb 21, 1941	Chicago Stadium, Chicago, Illinois, U.S.	Retained NBA middleweight title
63	Win	46–15–2	Steve Mamakos	PTS	10	Jan 10, 1941	Chicago Stadium, Chicago, Illinois, U.S.	
62	Win	45–15–2	Tony Martin	TKO	7 (10)	Jan 1, 1941	Auditorium, Milwaukee, Wisconsin, U.S.	
61	Win	44–15–2	Fred Apostoli	PTS	10	Nov 19, 1940	Civic Auditorium, Seattle, Washington, U.S.	
60	Loss	43–15–2	Billy Soose	UD	10	Aug 21, 1940	Civic Stadium, Seattle, Washington, U.S.	
59	Win	43–14–2	Al Hostak	TKO	13 (15)	Jul 19, 1940	Civic Stadium, Seattle, Washington, U.S.	Won NBA middleweight title
58	Win	42–14–2	Baby Kid Chocolate	KO	4 (10)	Jun 12, 1940	Idora Park, Youngstown, Ohio, U.S.	
57	Win	41–14–2	Ben Brown	KO	3 (10)	Mar 29, 1940	Chicago Stadium, Chicago, Illinois, U.S.	
56	Win	40–14–2	Enzo Iannozzi	KO	4 (10)	Feb 29, 1940	Rayen-Wood Auditorium, Youngstown, Ohio, U.S.	
55	Win	39–14–2	Al Hostak	UD	10	Jan 29, 1940	Chicago Stadium, Chicago, Illinois, U.S.	
54	Win	38–14–2	Babe Orgovan	KO	3 (8)	Dec 8, 1939	Chicago Stadium, Chicago, Illinois, U.S.	
53	Win	37–14–2	Eddie Meleski	TKO	1 (10)	Nov 13, 1939	Marigold Gardens, Chicago, Illinois, U.S.	
52	Win	36–14–2	Al Wardlow	KO	3 (10)	Oct 31, 1939	Rayen-Wood Auditorium, Youngstown, Ohio, U.S.	
51	Win	35–14–2	Sherman Edwards	TKO	3 (6)	Oct 6, 1939	Chicago Stadium, Chicago, Illinois, U.S.	
50	Win	34–14–2	Milton Shivers	KO	3 (10)	Aug 14, 1939	Marigold Gardens Outdoor Arena, Chicago, Illinois, U.S.	
49	Win	33–14–2	Babe Orgovan	PTS	6	May 23, 1939	Madison Square Garden, New York, U.S.	
48	Win	32–14–2	Johnny Shaw	KO	5 (8)	May 1, 1939	Marigold Gardens, Chicago, Illinois, U.S.	
47	Loss	31–14–2	Nate Bolden	PTS	10	Jan 2, 1939	Marigold Gardens, Chicago, Illinois, U.S.	
46	Win	31–13–2	Enzo Innazzi	PTS	6	Nov 18, 1938	Madison Square Garden, New York City, New York, U.S.	
45	Win	30–13–2	Jimmy Clark	KO	2 (8)	Oct 31, 1938	Marigold Gardens, Chicago, Illinois, U.S.	
44	Win	29–13–2	Tony Cisco	UD	10	Oct 10, 1938	Marigold Gardens, Chicago, Illinois, U.S.	
43	Loss	28–13–2	Billy Celebron	PTS	10	Aug 22, 1938	Marigold Gardens Outdoor Arena, Chicago, Illinois, U.S.	
42	Draw	28–12–2	Billy Celebron	PTS	10	Jul 18, 1938	Marigold Gardens Outdoor Arena, Chicago, Illinois, U.S.	
41	Win	28–12–1	Jimmy Clark	TKO	8 (8)	Jun 13, 1938	Marigold Gardens Outdoor Arena, Chicago, Illinois, U.S.	
40	Win	27–12–1	Bobby LaMonte	TKO	5 (8)	May 16, 1938	Marigold Gardens, Chicago, Illinois, U.S.	
39	Win	26–12–1	King Wyatt	PTS	8	Mar 28, 1938	Marigold Gardens, Chicago, Illinois, U.S.	
38	Loss	25–12–1	Jimmy Clark	KO	1 (8)	Feb 21, 1938	Marigold Gardens, Chicago, Illinois, U.S.	
37	Win	25–11–1	Henry Schaft	PTS	8	Jan 24, 1938	Marigold Gardens, Chicago, Illinois, U.S.	
36	Win	24–11–1	Nate Bolden	SD	8	Jan 3, 1938	Marigold Gardens, Chicago, Illinois, U.S.	
35	Win	23–11–1	Nate Bolden	PTS	5	Nov 22, 1937	Marigold Gardens, Chicago, Illinois, U.S.	
34	Win	22–11–1	Leon Jackson	PTS	6	Nov 10, 1937	Marigold Gardens, Chicago, Illinois, U.S.	
33	Loss	21–11–1	Nate Bolden	PTS	5	Nov 1, 1937	Marigold Gardens, Chicago, Illinois, U.S.	
32	Win	21–10–1	Bobby Gerry	KO	2 (4)	Oct 18, 1937	Marigold Gardens, Chicago, Illinois, U.S.	
31	Win	20–10–1	Billy Brown	KO	1 (4)	Oct 11, 1937	Marigold Gardens, Chicago, Illinois, U.S.	
30	Win	19–10–1	Elby Johnson	TKO	3 (4)	Sep 17, 1937	White City Arena, Chicago, Illinois, U.S.	
29	Loss	18–10–1	Manuel Davila	PTS	4	Aug 16, 1937	Marigold Gardens Outdoor Arena, Chicago, Illinois, U.S.	
28	Win	18–9–1	Elby Johnson	PTS	4	Jul 26, 1937	Marigold Gardens Outdoor Arena, Chicago, Illinois, U.S.	
27	Draw	17–9–1	Jack Moran	PTS	5	Apr 13, 1936	Marigold Gardens, Chicago, Illinois, U.S.	
26	Loss	17–9	Dave Clark	PTS	5	Jul 2, 1935	Comiskey Park, Chicago, Illinois, U.S.	
25	Loss	17–8	Johnny Phagan	KO	6 (8)	May 6, 1935	Midway Arena, Chicago, Illinois, U.S.	
24	Loss	17–7	Roughhouse Glover	TKO	9 (10)	Mar 27, 1935	Music Hall Arena, Cincinnati, U.S.	
23	Win	17–6	Max Elling	PTS	8	Mar 11, 1935	Marigold Gardens, Chicago, Illinois, U.S.	
22	Win	16–6	Young Jack Blackburn	PTS	6	Feb 25, 1935	Marigold Gardens, Chicago, Illinois, U.S.	
21	Loss	15–6	Joey Bazzone	PTS	6	Dec 28, 1934	Chicago Stadium, Chicago, Illinois, U.S.	
20	Loss	15–5	Jack Gibbons	PTS	10	Dec 17, 1934	Midway Arena, Chicago, Illinois, U.S.	
19	Loss	15–4	Kid Leonard	PTS	10	Nov 26, 1934	Peoria, Illinois, U.S.	
18	Win	15–3	Jack Charvez	PTS	8	Nov 5, 1934	Midway Arena, Chicago, Illinois, U.S.	
17	Win	14–3	Jack Schwartz	TKO	4 (8)	Oct 29, 1934	Auditorium, Milwaukee, Wisconsin, U.S.	
16	Win	13–3	Frankie Misko	KO	6 (8)	Oct 22, 1934	Midway Arena, Chicago, Illinois, U.S.	
15	Win	12–3	Young Jack Blackburn	PTS	8	Oct 8, 1934	Midway Arena, Chicago, Illinois, U.S.	
14	Win	11–3	Mickey Misko	KO	4 (8)	Sep 17, 1934	White City Arena, Chicago, Illinois, U.S.	
13	Loss	10–3	Mickey Misko	PTS	8	Sep 3, 1934	White City Arena, Chicago, Illinois, U.S.	
12	Win	10–2	Wilbur Stokes	PTS	8	Aug 27, 1934	White City Arena, Chicago, Illinois, U.S.	
11	Loss	9–2	George Black	PTS	6	Aug 15, 1934	Auditorium, Milwaukee, Wisconsin, U.S.	
10	Loss	9–1	Billy Hood	PTS	6	Aug 13, 1934	White City Arena, Chicago, Illinois, U.S.	
9	Win	9–0	Bruce Wade	KO	3 (4)	Aug 7, 1934	Peoria, Illinois, U.S.	
8	Win	8–0	Bobby Millsap	PTS	4	Jul 30, 1934	White City Arena, Chicago, Illinois, U.S.	
7	Win	7–0	Einar Hedquist	TKO	4 (4)	Jul 16, 1934	White City Arena, Chicago, Illinois, U.S.	
6	Win	6–0	Lou Bartell	PTS	4	Jul 9, 1934	White City Arena, Chicago, Illinois, U.S.	
5	Win	5–0	Ossie Jefferson	KO	3 (4)	Jul 2, 1934	White City Arena, Chicago, Illinois, U.S.	
4	Win	4–0	Johnny Liston	KO	3 (4)	Jun 25, 1934	White City Arena, Chicago, Illinois, U.S.	
3	Win	3–0	Bobby Millsap	KO	1 (4)	Jun 21, 1934	Bacon's Arena, Chicago, Illinois, U.S.	
2	Win	2–0	Johnny Simpson	PTS	4	Jun 15, 1934	Northwest Stadium, Chicago, Illinois, U.S.	
1	Win	1–0	Eddie Allen	PTS	4	Jun 11, 1934	Marigold Gardens Outdoor Arena, Chicago, Illinois, U.S.	

== Titles in boxing ==
=== Major world titles ===
- NYSAC middleweight champion (160 lbs) (2×)
- NBA (WBA) middleweight champion (160 lbs) (2×)

=== The Ring magazine titles ===
- The Ring middleweight champion (160 lbs) (2×)

=== Undisputed titles ===
- Undisputed middleweight champion (2×)

== See also ==
- List of middleweight boxing champions

Achievements
Preceded by Al Hostak	NBA Middleweight Champion; July 19, 1940 – July 16, 1947	Succeeded by Rocky Graziano
Preceded by Billy Soose; Retired	NYSAC World Middleweight Champion; November 28, 1941 – July 16, 1947	Succeeded by Rocky Graziano
Vacant Title last held by Freddie Steele	The Ring Middleweight Champion; November 28, 1941 – July 16, 1947	Succeeded by Rocky Graziano
Vacant Title last held by Mickey Walker	World Middleweight Champion; November 28, 1941 – July 16, 1947	Succeeded by Rocky Graziano
Preceded by Rocky Graziano	The Ring Middleweight Champion; June 10, 1948 – September 21, 1948	Succeeded by Marcel Cerdan
Preceded by Rocky Graziano	World Middleweight Champion; June 10, 1948 – September 21, 1948	Succeeded by Marcel Cerdan
