= Fred Apostoli =

American boxer (1913–1973)

Personal information
- Nickname: The Boxing Bell Hop
- Nationality: American
- Born: Alfredo Apostoli; February 2, 1913 San Francisco, California, U.S.
- Died: November 29, 1973 (aged 60) San Francisco, California, U.S.
- Height: 5 ft 9 1/2 in (1.77 m)
- Weight: Middleweight

Boxing career
- Reach: 70 in (178 cm)
- Stance: Orthodox

Boxing record
- Total fights: 72
- Wins: 61
- Win by KO: 31
- Losses: 10
- Draws: 1

External image
- Apostoli (right) having his hand wrapped in an undated photo by Harry E. Winkler (film negative held by the University of Notre Dame library)

Alfredo "Fred" Apostoli (February 2, 1913 – November 29, 1973) was a rugged, accomplished body punching middleweight, who was recognized as the world champion when he defeated Marcel Thil on September 23, 1937. Statistical boxing website BoxRec lists Apostoli as the #8 ranked middleweight of all time. He was inducted into the Ring Magazine Hall of Fame in 1978, the World Boxing Hall of Fame in 1988, and the International Boxing Hall of Fame in 2003.

== Early life ==
Freddie Apostoli was born in San Francisco and lived in North Beach and Fisherman's Wharf as a young child. His father worked as both a fisherman and laborer in the San Francisco area but had grown up in a farming community near Gibbstown, NJ in the late 19th century.

The Apostoli family immigrated to NYC in the 1880s from the city San Benedetto del Tronto in the Ascoli Piceno Province in the Marche region of Italy. Apostoli's mother died in child birth in the early 1920s and his father sent his other younger children back to live with relatives on the East coast and placed Freddy in the care of a Catholic orphanage in San Francisco. Apostoli attended grade school and high school in North Beach and was a lifelong friend of classmate Joe Dimaggio.

Apostoli's father was one of the workers killed in 1928 while working on a construction detail trying to access the damaged portion of a dam which had failed in Los Angeles County. During his time in the orphanage, Apostoli and the other teens were encouraged by the nuns of the parish to work their disputes out through boxing. Freddie quickly became a master of said technique and showed such promise that the parish arranged for him to receive more formal training. These lessons at a local YMCA gym were partially funded thru the donations the parish had received over the years from his family back East. Apostoli, who won the Pacific Coast Junior Welterweight championship, Golden Gloves Middleweight championship, and the National AAU middleweight championship in 1934, turned pro later that year.

== Pro career ==
=== Middleweight contender ===
He quickly moved up the ladder and fought future middleweight champion Freddie Steele within his first seven months as a professional. Although the more experienced Steele stopped him in 10 rounds, Apostoli went on to defeat top fighters such as Swede Berglund, Babe Marino, Babe Risko, Solly Krieger and Lou Brouillard to become the leading contender for the world championship.

=== World middleweight champion ===
Eventually, Apostoli was matched with title claimant Marcel Thil; he defeated the Frenchman via a 10th-round TKO. The New York Boxing Commission, however, still recognized Freddie Steele as champion. In 1938, Apostoli fought Steele in a non-title rematch and avenged his earlier defeat with a 9th-round KO. On November 18, 1938, Apostoli won by TKO in the 8th round against Young Corbett III and was officially recognized by the NYSAC as absolute middleweight world champion. Apostoli also fought as a light heavyweight. Although he dropped two close decisions to Hall of Famer Billy Conn, Conn always credited Apostoli as a great fighter who hurt him in both matches. On October 2, 1939, Apostoli's title reign ended when he lost the middleweight crown to Ceferino Garcia.

=== World War II service and retirement ===
Apostoli served in the United States Navy during World War II as a gunner aboard the light cruiser USS Columbia (CL-56) in the Pacific theater. Wounded in battle, he received a Bronze Star and returned to San Francisco in 1946. He rehabilitated from injuries sustained in the Battle of Midway at Letterman Army Hospital located in the Presidio of San Francisco. He retired from the ring in 1948 and served as a member of the Olympic Club in San Francisco.

== Professional boxing record ==
72 fights	61 wins	10 losses
By knockout	31	4
By decision	30	6
Draws	1	

No.	Result	Record	Opponent	Type	Round	Date	Location	Notes
72	Loss	61–10–1	Earl Turner	UD	10	Dec 1, 1948	Auditorium, Oakland, California, U.S.	
71	Win	61–9–1	Georgie Abrams	MD	10	Nov 17, 1947	Civic Auditorium, San Francisco, California, U.S.	
70	Win	60–9–1	Reuben Shank	UD	10	Aug 25, 1947	Civic Auditorium, San Francisco, California, U.S.	
69	Win	59–9–1	Reuben Shank	RTD	8 (10)	Jul 14, 1947	Civic Auditorium, San Francisco, California, U.S.	
68	Win	58–9–1	Bobby Volk	SD	10	May 21, 1947	Oaks Ballpark, Emeryville, California, U.S.	
67	Win	57–9–1	George Duke	PTS	10	May 2, 1947	Los Banos, California, U.S.	
66	Win	56–9–1	Bobby Volk	KO	3 (10)	Apr 7, 1947	Civic Auditorium, San Francisco, California, U.S.	
65	Loss	55–9–1	Bobby Volk	TKO	1 (10)	Feb 28, 1947	Legion Stadium, Hollywood, California, U.S.	
64	Win	55–8–1	Paul Lewis	UD	10	Dec 11, 1946	Auditorium, Oakland, California, U.S.	
63	Win	54–8–1	Frankie Angustain	MD	10	Nov 18, 1946	Civic Auditorium, San Francisco, California, U.S.	
62	Win	53–8–1	Tommy Egan	PTS	10	Oct 21, 1946	Civic Auditorium, San Francisco, California, U.S.	
61	Win	52–8–1	George Duke	KO	9 (10)	Sep 20, 1946	Civic Auditorium, San Francisco, California, U.S.	
60	Win	51–8–1	Sheik Rangel	PTS	10	Aug 27, 1946	Memorial Auditorium, Sacramento, California, U.S.	
59	Win	50–8–1	Dencio Cabanela Jr	TKO	7 (10)	Sep 9, 1946	Coliseum Bowl, San Francisco, California, U.S.	
58	Win	49–8–1	Pedro Jimenez	TKO	4 (10)	Aug 12, 1946	Coliseum Bowl, San Francisco, California, U.S.	
57	Win	48–8–1	Saverio Turiello	PTS	10	Aug 24, 1942	Foreman Field, Naval Base, Norfolk, New Jersey, U.S.	
56	Draw	47–8–1	Ken Overlin	PTS	10	Jun 26, 1942	Foreman Field, Naval Base, Norfolk, New Jersey, U.S.	
55	Win	47–8	Joe Mulli	TKO	2 (8)	Apr 4, 1942	Ridgewood Grove, New York City, New York, U.S.	
54	Win	46–8	Augie Arellano	TKO	5 (8)	Mar 7, 1942	Ridgewood Grove, New York City, New York, U.S.	
53	Win	45–8	El Brookman	TKO	6 (10)	Oct 14, 1941	Uline Arena, Washington, D.C., U.S.	
52	Win	44–8	Joey Spangler	TKO	5 (10)	Sep 15, 1941	Municipal Auditorium, Norfolk, New Jersey, U.S.	
51	Win	43–8	Bill McDowell	TKO	2 (10)	Aug 21, 1941	Foreman Field, Naval Base, Norfolk, New Jersey, U.S.	
50	Loss	42–8	Tony Zale	PTS	10	Nov 19, 1940	Civic Auditorium, Seattle, Washington, U.S.	
49	Win	42–7	Bobby Pacho	PTS	10	Sep 16, 1940	Coliseum Bowl, San Francisco, California, U.S.	
48	Win	41–7	Big Boy Hogue	PTS	10	Aug 19, 1940	Coliseum Bowl, San Francisco, California, U.S.	
47	Win	40–7	Dale Sparr	KO	5 (10)	Jul 22, 1940	Coliseum Bowl, San Francisco, California, U.S.	
46	Loss	39–7	Melio Bettina	RTD	12 (15)	Feb 2, 1940	Madison Square Garden, New York City, New York, U.S.	
45	Win	39–6	Melio Bettina	MD	12	Jan 5, 1940	Madison Square Garden, New York City, New York, U.S.	
44	Loss	38–6	Ceferino Garcia	KO	7 (15)	Oct 2, 1939	Madison Square Garden, New York City, New York, U.S.	Lost NYSAC middleweight title
43	Win	38–5	Glen Lee	MD	10	Aug 28, 1939	Forbes Field, Pittsburgh, Pennsylvania, U.S.	
42	Win	37–5	Mohamed Fahmy	TKO	3 (10)	Aug 7, 1939	Eastern States Coliseum, West Springfield, Massachusetts, U.S.	
41	Win	36–5	Eric Seelig	SD	10	May 1, 1939	Public Hall, Cleveland, Ohio, U.S.	
40	Win	35–5	George Nichols	KO	2 (10)	Apr 17, 1939	Open-Air Arena, Houston, Texas, U.S.	
39	Loss	34–5	Billy Conn	UD	15	Feb 10, 1939	Madison Square Garden, New York City, New York, U.S.	
38	Loss	34–4	Billy Conn	UD	10	Jan 6, 1939	Madison Square Garden, New York City, New York, U.S.	
37	Win	34–3	Al Cocozza	TKO	4 (10)	Dec 20, 1938	Arena, New Haven, Connecticut, U.S.	
36	Win	33–3	Young Corbett III	TKO	8 (15)	Nov 18, 1938	Madison Square Garden, New York City, New York, U.S.	Won vacant NYSAC middleweight title
35	Win	32–3	Butch Lynch	TKO	2 (10)	Sep 16, 1938	Dreamland Auditorium, San Francisco, California, U.S.	
34	Win	31–3	Mike Payan	KO	2 (10)	Sep 6, 1938	Civic Auditorium, San Jose, California, U.S.	
33	Win	30–3	Glen Lee	PTS	10	Apr 1, 1938	Madison Square Garden, New York City, New York, U.S.	
32	Loss	29–3	Young Corbett III	PTS	10	Feb 22, 1938	Seals Stadium, San Francisco, California, U.S.	
31	Win	29–2	Glen Lee	SD	12	Feb 4, 1938	Madison Square Garden, New York City, New York, U.S.	
30	Win	28–2	Freddie Steele	TKO	9 (12)	Jan 7, 1938	Madison Square Garden, New York City, New York, U.S.	
29	Win	27–2	Tony Celli	TKO	2 (10)	Oct 25, 1937	Arena, Philadelphia, Pennsylvania, U.S.	
28	Win	26–2	Marcel Thil	TKO	10 (15)	Sep 23, 1937	Polo Grounds, New York City, New York, U.S.	Won IBU middleweight title
27	Win	25–2	Tommy Jones	KO	2 (10)	Jun 22, 1937	Auditorium, Portland, Oregon, U.S.	
26	Win	24–2	Dale Sparr	PTS	10	Jun 11, 1937	Dreamland Auditorium, San Francisco, California, U.S.	
25	Win	23–2	Solly Krieger	TKO	5 (12)	Apr 14, 1937	Hippodrome, New York City, New York, U.S.	
24	Win	22–2	Butch Lynch	TKO	9 (10)	Mar 15, 1937	Laurel Garden, Newark, New Jersey, U.S.	
23	Win	21–2	Solly Krieger	UD	10	Feb 17, 1937	Hippodrome, New York City, New York, U.S.	
22	Loss	20–2	Ken Overlin	MD	10	Jan 27, 1937	Hippodrome, New York City, New York, U.S.	
21	Win	20–1	Babe Marino	PTS	10	Dec 14, 1936	Dreamland Auditorium, San Francisco, California, U.S.	
20	Win	19–1	Lou Brouillard	PTS	10	Oct 9, 1936	Dreamland Auditorium, San Francisco, California, U.S.	
19	Win	18–1	Marty Simmons	PTS	10	Aug 21, 1936	Dreamland Auditorium, San Francisco, California, U.S.	
18	Win	17–1	Eddie Babe Risko	PTS	10	May 8, 1936	Dreamland Auditorium, San Francisco, California, U.S.	
17	Win	16–1	Young Stuhley	PTS	10	Apr 6, 1936	Dreamland Auditorium, San Francisco, California, U.S.	
16	Win	15–1	Paul Pirrone	RTD	7 (10)	Feb 28, 1936	Dreamland Auditorium, San Francisco, California, U.S.	
15	Win	14–1	Frankie Britt	PTS	10	Jan 20, 1936	Civic Auditorium, San Francisco, California, U.S.	
14	Win	13–1	Swede Berglund	PTS	10	Nov 27, 1935	Civic Auditorium, San Francisco, California, U.S.	
13	Win	12–1	Babe Marino	PTS	10	Oct 25, 1935	Dreamland Auditorium, San Francisco, California, U.S.	
12	Win	11–1	Young Stuhley	PTS	10	Oct 4, 1935	Dreamland Auditorium, San Francisco, California, U.S.	
11	Win	10–1	Rudy Mendez	PTS	8	Aug 14, 1935	Civic Auditorium, San Francisco, California, U.S.	
10	Win	9–1	Dick Foster	TKO	6 (8)	Jul 31, 1935	Civic Auditorium, San Francisco, California, U.S.	
9	Win	8–1	Eddie Schneider	KO	1 (8)	Jul 17, 1935	Civic Auditorium, San Francisco, California, U.S.	
8	Win	7–1	Mike Payan	PTS	10	May 31, 1935	Dreamland Auditorium, San Francisco, California, U.S.	
7	Loss	6–1	Freddie Steele	TKO	10 (10)	Apr 1, 1935	Civic Auditorium, San Francisco, California, U.S.	
6	Win	6–0	Newsboy Millich	TKO	4 (6)	Feb 22, 1935	Kezar Stadium, San Francisco, California, U.S.	
5	Win	5–0	Andy DiVodi	PTS	6	Jan 28, 1935	Civic Auditorium, San Francisco, California, U.S.	
4	Win	4–0	Eddie Fox	TKO	5 (6)	Jan 7, 1935	Civic Auditorium, San Francisco, California, U.S.	
3	Win	3–0	Eddie Daniels	TKO	2 (6)	Nov 30, 1934	Civic Auditorium, San Francisco, California, U.S.	
2	Win	2–0	Jack Riley	KO	1 (6)	Nov 12, 1934	Civic Auditorium, San Francisco, California, U.S.	
1	Win	1–0	Gilbert Attell	TKO	3 (6)	Oct 8, 1934	Civic Auditorium, San Francisco, California, U.S.	

Achievements
Preceded by Freddie Steele; Recognition Withdrawn	NYSAC World Middleweight Champion; 18 November 1938 – 2 October 1939	Succeeded by Ceferino Garcia
