= John McAvoy =

John McAvoy may refer to:

- John McAvoy (footballer) (1878–?), Scottish footballer
- John H. McAvoy (1830–1893), Chicago businessman and politician
- John McAvoy (athlete), competitor in the Ironman Triathlon
- John C. McAvoy (1905–1995), American football player and coach
- Jack McAvoy (John H. McAvoy, c. 1930–2008), American football and basketball coach and college athletic administrator
- Gerry McAvoy (John Gerrard McAvoy, born 1951), Northern Irish blues rock bass guitarist

== See also ==
- Jock McAvoy (1908–1971), British boxer
