= McAvoy =

McAvoy, MacAvoy or Mac-Avoy (/ˈmækəvɔɪ/) is an Irish surname. Notable people with the surname include:

- Alex McAvoy (1928–2005), Scottish actor
- Andy McAvoy (born 1979), English footballer
- Billy McAvoy, Northern Irish footballer
- Charlie McAvoy (born 1997), American ice hockey defenseman
- Ciara McAvoy, Scottish artist
- Doug McAvoy (1939–2019), British trade union leader
- Doug McAvoy (footballer) (1918–1988), Scottish footballer
- Dylan McAvoy, fictional character from The Young and the Restless
- Édouard Georges Mac-Avoy (1906–1991), French artist and portraitist
- Francis S. McAvoy (1856–1926), American jurist
- Frank McAvoy (1875–?), Scottish professional footballer
- George McAvoy (baseball) (1884–1952), American baseball player
- George McAvoy (1931–1998), Canadian ice hockey player
- Gerry McAvoy (born 1951), Northern Ireland guitarist
- Jack McAvoy, American football coach
- James McAvoy (born 1979), Scottish actor
- Jess McAvoy, Australian musician
- Jock McAvoy (1908–1971), British boxer
- John McAvoy (disambiguation)
- May McAvoy (1899–1984), American actress
- Michael McAvoy (1871–1950), Scottish footballer with Darwen and St Mirren
- Nathan McAvoy (born 1976), English rugby league player
- Paul MacAvoy (1934–2016), American economist
- R. A. MacAvoy (born 1949), American author
- Thomas C. MacAvoy (1928–2015), former president of the Boy Scouts of America
- Thomas James McAvoy (born 1938), American jurist
- Tom McAvoy (1936–2011), baseball pitcher
- Tommy McAvoy (1943–2024), Scottish politician
- Tony McAvoy, first Indigenous Australian QC and presenter of the 2021 Dr Charles Perkins Oration
- Walter C. McAvoy (1904-1990), American politician
- Wickey McAvoy (1894–1973), American professional baseball player
- William H. McAvoy, aviator
- William McAvoy (1884–1956), American college sports coach

== See also ==
- McEvoy
