= McVoy =

Surname list

McVoy is a surname. Notable people with the surname include:

- Carl McVoy (1931–1992), American pianist
- Larry McVoy (born 1962), American computer programmer

== See also ==
- McAvoy
- McCoy (surname)
