= Fred McEvoy =

Fred McEvoy may refer to:

- Frederick McEvoy (1907–1951), Australian/British sportsman and socialite
- Fred McEvoy (footballer) (1913–1982), Australian rules footballer
- Frederick McEvoy (cricketer) (1856–1913), Australian cricketer
