= McEvoy =

Mac Fhiodhbhuidhe, Mac Giolla Bhuidhe, McEvoy
- Language: Irish language

Origin
- Meaning: "son of the yellow-haired lad" or "son of the woodsman"
- Region of origin: Ireland

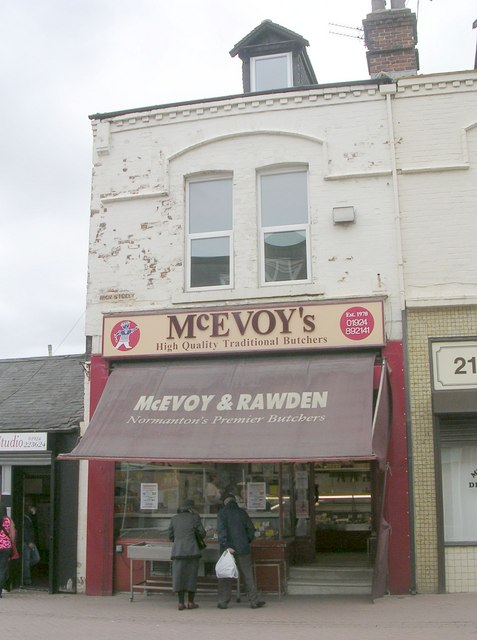

McEvoy (/ˈmækɪvɔɪ/; Irish: Mac Fhíobhuí or Mac Fhíodhbhuidhe or alternatively Mac Giolla Bhuidhe) is an Irish surname. It is closely related to the name McAvoy and with the placename Clandeboye, an anglicised version of Clann Fhiodhbhuidge. The name translates as either "son of the fair-haired lad" or "son of the woodsman", depending on the original Gaelic version referred to. According to historian C. Thomas Cairney, the MacEvoys were a chiefly family of the Oirghialla or Airgíalla tribe who were in turn from the Laigin tribe who were the third wave of Celts to settle in Ireland during the first century BC.

Notable people with the surname include:

- Ambrose McEvoy (1878–1927), English artist
- Andy McEvoy (1938–1994), Irish footballer
- Anne Marie McEvoy (born 1975), American actress and psychologist
- Arthur J. McEvoy (1882–1941), Canadian politician
- Barney McEvoy (1933–2016), Australian rugby league player
- Barry McEvoy (born 1967), Irish film actor/writer
- Ben McEvoy (born 1989), Australian rules footballer
- Brian McEvoy (born 1974), Irish hurler
- Cameron McEvoy (Born 1994), Triple Australian Olympic swimmer
- Catherine McEvoy (born 1956), Irish musician
- Charles McEvoy (1879–1929), British playwright
- Christopher McEvoy (1899–1953), English flying ace
- Danny McEvoy (born 1946), Australian cricketer
- Don McEvoy (1928–2004), English footballer and manager
- Dorothy McEvoy (1910–1994), English cricketer
- Edward McEvoy (1826–1899), Irish politician
- Eleanor McEvoy (born 1967), Irish singer-songwriter
- Enda McEvoy (born 1977), Irish head chef
- Eoin McEvoy, Irish Gaelic footballer
- Eugenie McEvoy (1879–1975), American artist
- Fred McEvoy (footballer) (1913–1982), Australian rules footballer
- Frederick McEvoy (1907–1951), Australian socialite
- Frederick McEvoy (cricketer) (1856–1913), Australian cricketer
- Harry McEvoy (1902–1984), British industrialist
- J. P. McEvoy (1897–1958), American comics writer
- James McEvoy (philosopher) (1943–2010), Irish philosopher
- Jennifer McEvoy, actor
- Johnny McEvoy (born 1945), Irish singer
- Jonathan McEvoy (born 1989), English cyclist
- Kenny McEvoy (born 1994), Irish professional footballer
- Kerrin McEvoy, (born 1980), Australian jockey
- Lola McEvoy, British politician
- Lou McEvoy (1902–1953), American baseball player
- Lucianne McEvoy, Irish actress
- Lucy McEvoy (born 2001), Australian rules footballer
- Martin McEvoy (born 1951), English opera singer
- Mary McEvoy (born 1954), Irish actress
- Mary McEvoy (artist) (1870–1941), British painter
- Michael McEvoy (born 1956), Indian-born English cricketer
- Michael J McEvoy (born 1961), American musician
- Ned McEvoy (born 1886), Irish hurler
- Neil McEvoy (born 1970), Welsh politician
- Neil McEvoy (Canadian football) (born 1974), Canadian gridiron football administrator
- Niamh McEvoy (footballer, born 1990) (born 1990), Gaelic and Australian rules footballer
- Niamh McEvoy (Parnells Gaelic footballer), Dublin senior ladies' footballer
- Peter McEvoy (1953–2025), English amateur golfer
- Peter McEvoy (journalist), Australian journalist and television producer
- Richard McEvoy (born 1979), English golfer
- Ricky McEvoy (born 1967), Gibraltarian-born Irish footballer
- Tanner McEvoy (born 1993), American football player
- Theodore McEvoy (1904–1991), British Royal Air Force air marshal
- Timothy McEvoy, Judge of the Federal Court of Australia
- Tom McEvoy (born 1944), American poker player and author
- William McEvoy (1845–1930), Australian cricketer

== See also ==
- McEvoy Motorcycles, British motorcycle manufacturer
- Irish clans
