= Teddy Yarosz =

American boxer (1910–1974)

Personal information
- Nationality: American
- Born: Thaddeus Jarosz; June 24, 1910 Pittsburgh, Pennsylvania, U.S.
- Died: March 29, 1974 (aged 63) Rochester, Pennsylvania, U.S.
- Height: 5 ft 10 in (1.78 m)
- Weight: Middleweight; Light Heavyweight

Boxing career
- Reach: 72 1/2 in (184 cm)
- Stance: Orthodox

Boxing record
- Total fights: 128
- Wins: 106
- Win by KO: 17
- Losses: 18
- Draws: 3
- No contests: 1

Thaddeus Yarosz (June 24, 1910 – March 29, 1974) was an American boxer. He held the world middleweight boxing championship from 1934 to 1935.

== Early life ==
Yarosz was born the second of eight children on the North side of Pittsburgh, but when he was ten, his family moved to Monaca, Pennsylvania, a suburb twenty-six miles away. His father died when he was only sixteen, putting economic pressure on him and his brothers. As a result, he quit school at the age of seventeen in order to train for a boxing career to earn wages for his family.

His older brother, Ed Yarosz, also helped the family financially. Their brothers, Tommy and Victor, were also boxers; older brother Ed became an amateur boxer before Teddy, who first put on a pair of gloves at roughly the age of twelve. Their brother Joe won an all-service welterweight tournament during his time in the military.

Teddy Yarosz ultimately became known as a strong defensive boxer; although he never recorded many knockouts, he lost only one bout by knockout against Babe Risko in January 1935.

== Professional boxing career ==
Yarosz became a professional boxer in 1929. He would eventually be trained by the legendary Ray Arcel and managed by Ray Fouts.

On August 21, 1933, Yarosz won the Pennsylvania version of the world middleweight title from Vince Dundee in ten rounds before 15,000 at Pittsburgh's Forbes Field. Yarosz annoyed Dundee with frequent left jabs to the face and scored repeatedly with rights to the jaw. In the second, Yarosz had Dundee against the ropes for over a half minute, and scored with lefts and rights to both the head and face with little return. In the ninth, Dundee took a strong offensive stand, but was too exhausted to do much damage to Yarosz.

Yarosz defended the Pennsylvania version of the middleweight title against Jimmy Smith on February 12, 1934, winning in a fifteen-round unanimous decision before a crowd of 5,000 in Pittsburgh. Yarosz took the offense through most of the long bout, and there were no knockdowns by either competitor. Yarosz dominated the fighting in the eleventh and twelfth. Smith forced the fighting in the thirteenth through fifteenth rounds, but was ineffective against the left of Yarosz. The United Press gave Yarosz all but the first, second, ninth, and thirteenth. The blows of Smith were well defended by Yarosz with his gloves and elbows, while Yarosz continuously shot through his left and connected nearly every time.

=== Taking the world middleweight title ===
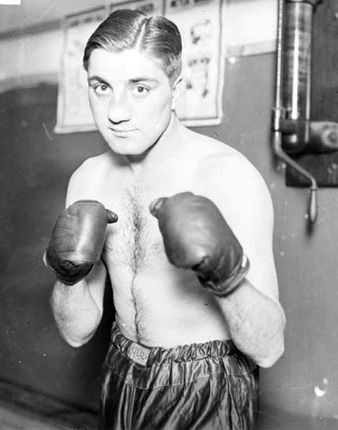
Vince Dundee

As a rising star, Yarosz was featured on the cover of the January 1934 issue of The Ring magazine. He took the NYSAC World Middleweight Title and National Boxing Association World Middleweight Title with a fifteen-round decision over Vince Dundee before a crowd of 28,000 at Forbes Field, on 11 September 1934 in his native Pittsburgh. The bout was close but somewhat dull due to too much wrestling and clinching, though Yarosz seemed to hold the lead in all but the late rounds when he looked visibly exhausted. Yarosz was awarded eight rounds to Dundee's four, with three even. He scored well with long range blows to the head of Dundee, who seemed to focus more on Yarosz's midsection. Dundee was down three times during the bout, once falling out of the ropes in round three.

Yarosz defended the Pennsylvania version of the middleweight title on April 6, 1934, against former world middleweight champion Ben Jeby, winning in a twelve-round points decision in Pittsburgh. Yarosz was most effective with right hand smashes to the jaw and body of Jeby, who was never given the chance to fight inside where he usually excelled. The Pittsburgh Press gave Yarosz nine rounds, with one to Jeby and two even.

=== Losing the world middleweight title ===
Yarosz lost both the NBA and NYSAC middleweight title to Eddie Babe Risko who defeated him on September 19, 1935, in Pittsburgh in fifteen rounds before a crowd of 25,000. Risko knocked Yarosz to the mat twice for counts of nine in the sixth and seventh rounds, and several judges gave Yarosz only the first round. Yarosz made his best showing in the eighth but did not appear to win any other round on points. In the ninth, Yarosz was stunned by a blow beneath his heart which caused him to clinch, and after the third had received frequent pounding to his midsection. Yarosz injured his right knee in the fourth round or possibly earlier, and had surgery two months later to repair it.

After his loss to Risko, the legendary trainer Ray Arcel worked with Yarosz for months to rehabilitate his knee, heating and massaging it, and supervising his work with weights.

On September 21, 1936, Yarosz defeated Risko for the first time in a close ten round split decision, demonstrating the skills of his trainer and the depths of his recovery from his knee injury. Yarosz showed a definite advantage from the first round, scoring with roundhouse swings, and shining in the seventh where he pummeled the slower moving Risko.

Unfazed by his loss of the title, Yarosz scored an impressive victory over future world middleweight champion Solly Krieger on January 13, 1937, in a ten-round unanimous decision in New York. Yarosz took seven rounds to three for Krieger.

Yarosz defeated former world welter and middleweight champion Lou Brouillard on May 7, 1937, in a ten-round points decision before 2,438 in Boston. With a darting left and a lightning fast right cross, Yarosz gained a large enough margin on points to take the decision. Brouillard offered strong opposition through the entire bout taking at least two rounds with strong body blows to Yarosz's middle, but his crouching southpaw defense was penetrated too often to even the scoring. In the tenth, Brouillard opened with a strong two fisted attack that had Yarosz retreating, but was knocked down for a count of two with a right before the round ended.

On June 6, 1938, Georgie Abrams defeated Yarosz in a ten-round split decision at Griffith Stadium in Washington, D.C.

Yarosz lost to the skilled, youthful opponent Billy Conn, another boxer trained by Ray Arcel, on June 30, 1937, in a close twelve round split decision before 13,874 at Forbes Field in Pittsburgh. Yarosz started the first three rounds on offense, scoring heavily with hooks, jabs, and right crosses. Conn looked stronger in the fourth and fifth, scoring with lefts and rights to the head and body. For the sixth through tenth, the well matched duo boxed cautiously, until the final two rounds where both boxers slugged it out, often toe to toe. The excited fans protested the close decision, though Conn was credited with taking the middleweight championship of Pennsylvania.

On September 30, 1937, Yarosz lost again to Conn in an equally close fifteen round split decision before 9,000 at Duquesne Garden in Pittsburgh. Yarosz boxed a smart fight in the first seven rounds, building up a significant points margin. But in the remainder of the long bout, Conn caught up and went ahead on points with a brutal body attack and an occasional right and left to the face that exhausted the older Yarosz who became nearly helpless in the closing rounds. In a fight that had been slow and methodical, the fourteenth opened when Conn dealt a blow to Yarosz's head that made it difficult for him to complete the round, and though he managed, he had little strength left in the fifteenth.

Yarosz defeated Conn only once on July 25, 1938, in a twelve-round unanimous decision before a crowd of 10,800 at Forbes Field in Pittsburgh. According to the Pittsburgh Press the bout included kidney punching and low left hooks from Conn, and thumbing, gouging and heeling from the gloves of Yarosz. Both fighters, out of anger, continued fighting after the second and fifth rounds. Yarosz outboxed Conn in the last few rounds and Conn was unable to find a remedy or an adequate defense. Yarosz was awarded seven rounds, with just one to Conn, with the seventh even.

In a July 5, 1938, rating of American middleweights, Yarosz was still placed in the top ten by the Cincinnati Enquirer, remaining in top contention for a four-year period, if not the majority of his later career.

Future NYSAC world middleweight champion Ken Overlin fell to Yarosz, on March 27, 1939, in a ten-round points decision in Houston. Dominating with his left, the United Press gave seven rounds to Yarosz with only two to Overlin and one even.

Yarosz defeated Archie Moore, future light heavyweight champion, on April 20, 1939, in a ten-round unanimous decision in St. Louis. He used his always present left to deliver and ward off blows, and took the close with the help of a low blow penalty that cost Moore a round. Only in the seventh and eighth was Moore able to penetrate the defenses of Yarosz.

== Retirement from boxing and later life ==
He married Eugenia Lesniak of Lawrenceville, Pennsylvania in 1940.

After retiring from boxing in 1942, he operated a bar called "Teddy's Inn" in Potter Township and worked for a while as a policeman. After the war years, he worked as a caster at the Aliquippa Works of the Jones and Laughlin steel corporation until his death.

== Death and interment ==
Yarosz died after a six-month battle with cancer on March 29, 1974, at Beaver Medical Center in Rochester, Pennsylvania, a mile and a half North of his home in Monica, where he had been a member of St. John's Church. He was buried in nearby St. John's Cemetery and was survived by his wife, four sons and a daughter. He was inducted into the International Boxing Hall of Fame for the Class of 2006.

== Professional boxing record ==
All information in this section is derived from BoxRec, unless otherwise stated.

=== Official record ===
128 fights	106 wins	18 losses
By knockout	17	1
By decision	89	17
Draws	3	
Newspaper decisions/draws	1	

All newspaper decisions are officially regarded as “no decision” bouts and are not counted in the win/loss/draw column.

No.	Result	Record	Opponent	Type	Round	Date	Location	Notes
128	Loss	106–18–3 (1)	Joe Muscato	UD	8	Feb 12, 1942	Knights of Columbus Auditorium, Rochester, New York, U.S.	
127	Loss	106–17–3 (1)	Ezzard Charles	UD	10	Nov 17, 1941	Music Hall Arena, Cincinnati, Ohio, U.S.	
126	Win	106–16–3 (1)	Jimmy Young	PTS	10	Jun 30, 1941	Point Stadium, Johnstown, Pennsylvania, U.S.	
125	Loss	105–16–3 (1)	Tommy Gómez	UD	10	Jun 16, 1941	Benjamin Field Arena, Tampa, Florida, U.S.	
124	Win	105–15–3 (1)	Bobby Berry	PTS	10	Mar 26, 1941	Armory, Akron, Ohio, U.S.	
123	Loss	104–15–3 (1)	Jimmy Bivins	PTS	10	Mar 5, 1941	Arena, Cleveland, Ohio, U.S.	
122	Win	104–14–3 (1)	Lloyd Marshall	PTS	10	Oct 21, 1940	Duquesne Gardens, Pittsburgh, Pennsylvania, U.S.	
121	Win	103–14–3 (1)	Bud Mignault	PTS	10	Jun 27, 1940	Patterson Field, East Liverpool, Ohio, U.S.	
120	Win	102–14–3 (1)	Jimmy Reeves	SD	10	Apr 15, 1940	Public Hall, Cleveland, Ohio, U.S.	
119	Loss	101–14–3 (1)	Turkey Thompson	PTS	10	Mar 26, 1940	Olympic Auditorium, Los Angeles, California, U.S.	
118	Win	101–13–3 (1)	Willie Muldune	PTS	10	Feb 29, 1940	Public Hall, Cleveland, Ohio, U.S.	
117	Win	100–13–3 (1)	Nate Bolden	PTS	10	Jan 8, 1940	Duquesne Garden, Pittsburgh, Pennsylvania, U.S.	
116	Loss	99–13–3 (1)	Lloyd Marshall	PTS	10	Sep 29, 1939	Civic Auditorium, San Francisco, California, U.S.	
115	Loss	99–12–3 (1)	Ben Brown	PTS	10	Sep 11, 1939	Ponce de Leon Ballpark, Atlanta, Georgia, U.S.	
114	Loss	99–11–3 (1)	Ben Brown	PTS	10	Aug 9, 1939	Ponce de Leon Ballpark, Atlanta, Georgia, U.S.	
113	Win	99–10–3 (1)	Al Gainer	PTS	10	Jul 17, 1939	Forbes Field, Pittsburgh, Pennsylvania, U.S.	
112	Win	98–10–3 (1)	Archie Moore	UD	10	Apr 20, 1939	Municipal Auditorium, Saint Louis, Missouri, U.S.	
111	Win	97–10–3 (1)	Ken Overlin	PTS	10	Mar 27, 1939	Olympiad Arena, Houston, Texas, U.S.	
110	Draw	96–10–3 (1)	Erich Seelig	PTS	8	Feb 3, 1939	Madison Square Garden, New York City, New York, U.S.	
109	Win	96–10–2 (1)	Ralph DeJohn	PTS	10	Dec 12, 1938	Motor Square Garden, Pittsburgh, Pennsylvania, U.S.	
108	Win	95–10–2 (1)	Ralph DeJohn	UD	10	Dec 1, 1938	Convention Hall, Rochester, New York, U.S.	
107	Loss	94–10–2 (1)	Ralph DeJohn	MD	8	Nov 11, 1938	Convention Hall, Rochester, New York, U.S.	
106	Win	94–9–2 (1)	Oscar Rankins	SD	10	Oct 24, 1938	Motor Square Garden, Pittsburgh, Pennsylvania, U.S.	
105	Win	93–9–2 (1)	Jimmy Clark	UD	10	Sep 13, 1938	Convention Hall, Rochester, New York, U.S.	
104	Win	92–9–2 (1)	Billy Conn	UD	12	Jul 25, 1938	Forbes Field, Pittsburgh, Pennsylvania, U.S.	
103	Loss	91–9–2 (1)	Georgie Abrams	SD	10	Jun 6, 1938	Griffith Stadium, Washington, D.C., U.S.	
102	Win	91–8–2 (1)	Al Quaill	UD	10	May 12, 1938	Duquesne Garden, Pittsburgh, Pennsylvania, U.S.	
101	Win	90–8–2 (1)	George Black	PTS	10	Apr 26, 1938	Auditorium, Milwaukee, Wisconsin, U.S.	
100	Loss	89–8–2 (1)	Carmen Barth	SD	10	Mar 28, 1938	Arena, Cleveland, Ohio, U.S.	
99	Win	89–7–2 (1)	Paulie Mahoney	UD	10	Feb 7, 1938	Broadway Auditorium, Buffalo, New York, U.S.	
98	Loss	88–7–2 (1)	Carmelo Candel	PTS	10	Dec 9, 1937	Salle Wagram, Paris, France	
97	Loss	88–6–2 (1)	Billy Conn	SD	15	Sep 30, 1937	Duquesne Garden, Pittsburgh, Pennsylvania, U.S.	
96	Loss	88–5–2 (1)	Billy Conn	SD	12	Jun 30, 1937	Forbes Field, Pittsburgh, Pennsylvania, U.S.	
95	Win	88–4–2 (1)	Lou Brouillard	PTS	10	May 7, 1937	Mechanics Building, Boston, Massachusetts, U.S.	
94	Win	87–4–2 (1)	Solly Krieger	UD	10	Jan 13, 1937	Hippodrome, New York City, New York, U.S.	
93	Win	86–4–2 (1)	Eddie Maguire	PTS	10	Dec 17, 1936	Duquesne Garden, Pittsburgh, Pennsylvania, U.S.	
92	Win	85–4–2 (1)	Ken Overlin	UD	10	Nov 4, 1936	Motor Square Garden, Pittsburgh, Pennsylvania, U.S.	
91	Win	84–4–2 (1)	Babe Risko	SD	10	Sep 21, 1936	Forbes Field, Pittsburgh, Pennsylvania, U.S.	
90	Win	83–4–2 (1)	Young Terry	KO	10 (10)	Aug 12, 1936	Idora Park, Youngstown, Ohio, U.S.	
89	Win	82–4–2 (1)	Bob Turner	PTS	10	May 19, 1936	Hickey Park, Millvale, Pennsylvania, U.S.	
88	Loss	81–4–2 (1)	Babe Risko	UD	15	Sep 19, 1935	Forbes Field, Pittsburgh, Pennsylvania, U.S.	Lost NYSAC and NBA middleweight titles
87	Win	81–3–2 (1)	Oscar Schmeling	KO	3 (10)	Sep 2, 1935	Swiss Park Open Air Arena, Louisville, Kentucky, U.S.	
86	Win	80–3–2 (1)	Freddie Sallus	TKO	2 (10)	Jul 30, 1935	Harding Stadium, Steubenville, Ohio, U.S.	
85	Loss	79–3–2 (1)	Babe Risko	TKO	7 (10)	Jan 1, 1935	Town Hall, Scranton, Pennsylvania, U.S.	
84	Win	79–2–2 (1)	Kid Leonard	PTS	10	Dec 14, 1934	Chicago Stadium, Chicago, Illinois, U.S.	
83	Win	78–2–2 (1)	Johnny Phagan	UD	10	Oct 29, 1934	Auditorium, Milwaukee, Wisconsin, U.S.	
82	Win	77–2–2 (1)	Vince Dundee	SD	15	Sep 11, 1934	Forbes Field, Pittsburgh, Pennsylvania, U.S.	Won NYSAC and NBA middleweight titles
81	Win	76–2–2 (1)	Bud Saltis	PTS	10	Aug 13, 1934	Patterson Field, East Liverpool, Ohio, U.S.	
80	Win	75–2–2 (1)	Tait Littman	PTS	10	Jul 18, 1934	Wrigley Field, Chicago, Illinois, U.S.	
79	Win	74–2–2 (1)	Pete Latzo	TKO	4 (10)	Jun 5, 1934	Hickey Park, Millvale, Pennsylvania, U.S.	
78	Win	73–2–2 (1)	Freddie Heinz	PTS	10	May 18, 1934	Clarksburg, West Virginia, U.S.	
77	Win	72–2–2 (1)	Tommy Rios	UD	10	Apr 16, 1934	Canton Auditorium, Canton, Ohio, U.S.	
76	Win	71–2–2 (1)	Ben Jeby	PTS	12	Apr 6, 1934	Duquesne Garden, Pittsburgh, Pennsylvania, U.S.	Retained Pennsylvania State middleweight title
75	Win	70–2–2 (1)	Jimmy Smith	UD	15	Feb 12, 1934	Motor Square Garden, Pittsburgh, Pennsylvania, U.S.	Retained Pennsylvania State middleweight title
74	Win	69–2–2 (1)	Tony D'Alessandro	PTS	10	Dec 11, 1933	Valley Arena, Holyoke, Massachusetts, U.S.	
73	Win	68–2–2 (1)	Paul Pirrone	PTS	10	Dec 4, 1933	Public Hall, Cleveland, Ohio, U.S.	
72	Loss	67–2–2 (1)	Young Terry	PTS	10	Oct 25, 1933	Newark Armory, Newark, New Jersey, U.S.	
71	Win	67–1–2 (1)	Vince Dundee	PTS	10	Sep 18, 1933	Dreamland Park, Newark, New Jersey, U.S.	
70	Win	66–1–2 (1)	Vince Dundee	PTS	10	Aug 21, 1933	Forbes Field, Pittsburgh, Pennsylvania, U.S.	Won vacant Pennsylvania State middleweight title
69	Win	65–1–2 (1)	Al Rossi	PTS	10	Aug 7, 1933	Dreamland Park, Newark, New Jersey, U.S.	
68	Win	64–1–2 (1)	Freddie Polo	KO	5 (10)	Jul 24, 1933	Dreamland Park, Newark, New Jersey, U.S.	
67	Win	63–1–2 (1)	Sammy Slaughter	PTS	10	Jun 20, 1933	Public Hall, Cleveland, Ohio, U.S.	
66	Win	62–1–2 (1)	Tommy Freeman	UD	10	May 22, 1933	Hickey Park, Millvale, Pennsylvania, U.S.	
65	Win	61–1–2 (1)	Andy DiVodi	TKO	5 (10)	Apr 10, 1933	Motor Square Garden, Pittsburgh, Pennsylvania, U.S.	
64	Win	60–1–2 (1)	Paulie Walker	PTS	10	Mar 24, 1933	Northside Arena, Pittsburgh, Pennsylvania, U.S.	
63	Win	59–1–2 (1)	Eddie Ran	PTS	10	Mar 10, 1933	Olympia Stadium, Detroit, Michigan, U.S.	
62	Draw	58–1–2 (1)	Eddie Wolfe	PTS	10	Feb 27, 1933	Motor Square Garden, Pittsburgh, Pennsylvania, U.S.	
61	Loss	58–1–1 (1)	Eddie Wolfe	SD	10	Jan 23, 1933	Motor Square Garden, Pittsburgh, Pennsylvania, U.S.	
60	Win	58–0–1 (1)	Jackie King	UD	10	Dec 19, 1932	Northside Arena, Pittsburgh, Pennsylvania, U.S.	
59	Win	57–0–1 (1)	Jackie King	SD	10	Nov 18, 1932	Northside Arena, Pittsburgh, Pennsylvania, U.S.	
58	Win	56–0–1 (1)	Meyer Lichtenstein	PTS	10	Oct 14, 1932	Northside Arena, Pittsburgh, Pennsylvania, U.S.	
57	Draw	55–0–1 (1)	Eddie Wolfe	PTS	10	Oct 7, 1932	Madison Square Garden, New York City, New York, U.S.	
56	Win	55–0 (1)	Jimmy Belmont	UD	10	Aug 30, 1932	Hickey Park, Millvale, Pennsylvania, U.S.	
55	Win	54–0 (1)	Eddie Wolfe	PTS	10	Aug 12, 1932	State Fairgrounds Arena, Detroit, Michigan, U.S.	
54	Win	53–0 (1)	Lope Tenorio	UD	10	Jul 22, 1932	Hickey Park, Millvale, Pennsylvania, U.S.	
53	Win	52–0 (1)	Johnny Hayes	TKO	8 (10)	Jun 30, 1932	Hickey Park, Millvale, Pennsylvania, U.S.	
52	Win	51–0 (1)	Vincent Hambright	UD	10	Apr 11, 1932	Motor Square Garden, Pittsburgh, Pennsylvania, U.S.	
51	Win	50–0 (1)	Jimmy Hill	PTS	10	Jan 22, 1932	Arena Gardens, Detroit, Michigan, U.S.	
50	Win	49–0 (1)	Jimmy Belmont	PTS	10	Dec 25, 1931	Motor Square Garden, Pittsburgh, Pennsylvania, U.S.	
49	Win	48–0 (1)	Jimmy Moinette	PTS	10	Dec 10, 1931	Eagles Hall, East Liverpool, Ohio, U.S.	
48	Win	47–0 (1)	Tiger Joe Randall	UD	10	Aug 20, 1931	Hickey Park, Millvale, Pennsylvania, U.S.	
47	Win	46–0 (1)	Thomas Lawless	PTS	10	Jul 27, 1931	Meyers Bowl, North Braddock, Pennsylvania, U.S.	
46	Win	45–0 (1)	Marty McHale	NWS	10	Jul 15, 1931	American Legion Smoot Lot, Parkersburg, West Virginia, U.S.	
45	Win	45–0	Buck McTiernan	PTS	10	Jul 9, 1931	Hickey Park, Millvale, Pennsylvania, U.S.	
44	Win	44–0	Tommy Rios	PTS	10	Jun 2, 1931	Columbiana Park, East Liverpool, Ohio, U.S.	
43	Win	43–0	Tiger Joe Randall	PTS	10	Apr 16, 1931	Palisades Rink, McKeesport, Pennsylvania, U.S.	
42	Win	42–0	Larry Madge	PTS	10	Apr 8, 1931	State Armory, Oil City, Pennsylvania, U.S.	
41	Win	41–0	Eddie Kaufman	TKO	6 (8)	Mar 23, 1931	Canton Auditorium, Canton, Ohio, U.S.	
40	Win	40–0	Joe Trippe	UD	10	Mar 16, 1931	State Armory, Oil City, Pennsylvania, U.S.	
39	Win	39–0	Tiger Joe Randall	SD	10	Feb 20, 1931	Moose Temple, Pittsburgh, Pennsylvania, U.S.	
38	Win	38–0	Larry Madge	PTS	8	Feb 6, 1931	Nursery Armory, Franklin, Pennsylvania, U.S.	
37	Win	37–0	Mickey Fedor	PTS	10	Jan 30, 1931	Eagles Hall, East Liverpool, Ohio, U.S.	
36	Win	36–0	Jimmy Moinette	PTS	10	Jan 13, 1931	Barnes Auditorium, Alliance, Ohio, U.S.	
35	Win	35–0	Young Rudy	MD	8	Dec 15, 1930	Motor Square Garden, Pittsburgh, Pennsylvania, U.S.	
34	Win	34–0	Jimmy Neal	PTS	10	Nov 28, 1930	Moose Lodge, Pittsburgh, Pennsylvania, U.S.	
33	Win	33–0	Jimmy Belmont	PTS	10	Oct 20, 1930	Knights of Columbus Auditorium, Oil City, Pennsylvania, U.S.	
32	Win	32–0	Benny Burns	TKO	4 (10)	Oct 7, 1930	Eagles Hall, East Liverpool, Ohio, U.S.	
31	Win	31–0	Tiger Joe Randall	PTS	10	Sep 25, 1930	Hickey Park, Millvale, Pennsylvania, U.S.	
30	Win	30–0	Billy Holt	PTS	8	Aug 18, 1930	Meyers Bowl, North Braddock, Pennsylvania, U.S.	
29	Win	29–0	Johnny Rich	PTS	10	Aug 15, 1930	American Legion Arena, Belpre, Ohio, U.S.	
28	Win	28–0	Roger Brooks	PTS	10	Jul 15, 1930	Fouts Brothers Bowl, East Liverpool, Ohio, U.S.	
27	Win	27–0	Jackie Herman	UD	10	Jul 11, 1930	American Legion Arena, Belpre, Ohio, U.S.	
26	Win	26–0	Young Rudy	PTS	10	Jun 12, 1930	Junction Park, New Brighton, Pennsylvania, U.S.	
25	Win	25–0	Jack Murphy	TKO	8 (10)	May 29, 1930	Hickey Park, Millvale, Pennsylvania, U.S.	
24	Win	24–0	Jimmy Herman	TKO	3 (6)	May 14, 1930	Rayen-Wood Auditorium, Youngstown, Ohio, U.S.	
23	Win	23–0	Paul Oger	PTS	6	May 5, 1930	Market House Auditorium, Wheeling, West Virginia, U.S.	
22	Win	22–0	Joe Corelli	PTS	6	May 2, 1930	Moose Lodge, Pittsburgh, Pennsylvania, U.S.	
21	Win	21–0	Young Rudy	UD	10	Apr 28, 1930	The Coliseum, Washington, Pennsylvania, U.S.	
20	Win	20–0	Paul Oger	PTS	8	Apr 8, 1930	Eagles Hall, East Liverpool, Ohio, U.S.	
19	Win	19–0	Young Joe Walcott	PTS	6	Mar 31, 1930	Motor Square Garden, Pittsburgh, Pennsylvania, U.S.	
18	Win	18–0	Hans Roberts	PTS	8	Mar 11, 1930	Eagles Hall, East Liverpool, Ohio, U.S.	
17	Win	17–0	Jimmy McGraw	PTS	6	Feb 10, 1930	Market House Auditorium, Wheeling, West Virginia, U.S.	
16	Win	16–0	Jackie Herman	PTS	6	Jan 30, 1930	Palisades Rink, McKeesport, Pennsylvania, U.S.	
15	Win	15–0	Johnny Popicg	PTS	6	Jan 20, 1930	Market House Auditorium, Wheeling, West Virginia, U.S.	
14	Win	14–0	Johnny Dill	KO	3 (6)	Jan 9, 1930	Eagles Hall, East Liverpool, Ohio, U.S.	
13	Win	13–0	Billy Burke	TKO	3 (6)	Dec 16, 1929	Junction Park, New Brighton, Pennsylvania, U.S.	
12	Win	12–0	Billy Holt	PTS	6	Dec 5, 1929	City Hall Auditorium, Wellsville, Ohio, U.S.	
11	Win	11–0	Billy Yeltz	PTS	6	Nov 21, 1929	City Hall Auditorium, Wellsville, Ohio, U.S.	
10	Win	10–0	Johnny Brown	PTS	6	Nov 11, 1929	Armco Armory, Butler, Pennsylvania, U.S.	
9	Win	9–0	Carl Patron	TKO	4 (6)	Nov 7, 1929	City Hall Auditorium, Wellsville, Ohio, U.S.	
8	Win	8–0	Bob Collura	SD	6	Oct 25, 1929	Moose Lodge, Pittsburgh, Pennsylvania, U.S.	
7	Win	7–0	George Bretch	PTS	6	Sep 5, 1929	Junction Park, New Brighton, Pennsylvania, U.S.	
6	Win	6–0	Young Joe Walcott	PTS	6	Aug 26, 1929	Meyers Bowl, North Braddock, Pennsylvania, U.S.	
5	Win	5–0	Jimmy McDuff	TKO	2 (6)	Aug 22, 1929	Cycler Park, McKeesport, Pennsylvania, U.S.	
4	Win	4–0	Johnny Judd	KO	4 (6)	Aug 10, 1929	McKeesport, Pennsylvania, U.S.	
3	Win	3–0	Jack McCarthy	KO	2 (6)	Jul 11, 1929	Junction Park, New Brighton, Pennsylvania, U.S.	
2	Win	2–0	Johnny Brown	PTS	6	Jun 27, 1929	Junction Park, New Brighton, Pennsylvania, U.S.	
1	Win	1–0	Jackie King	PTS	4	Jun 13, 1929	Junction Park, New Brighton, Pennsylvania, U.S.	

=== Unofficial record ===
128 fights	107 wins	18 losses
By knockout	17	1
By decision	90	17
Draws	3	

Record with the inclusion of newspaper decisions in the win/loss/draw column.

No.	Result	Record	Opponent	Type	Round	Date	Location	Notes
128	Loss	107–18–3	Joe Muscato	UD	8	Feb 12, 1942	Knights of Columbus Auditorium, Rochester, New York, U.S.	
127	Loss	107–17–3	Ezzard Charles	UD	10	Nov 17, 1941	Music Hall Arena, Cincinnati, Ohio, U.S.	
126	Win	107–16–3	Jimmy Young	PTS	10	Jun 30, 1941	Point Stadium, Johnstown, Pennsylvania, U.S.	
125	Loss	106–16–3	Tommy Gómez	UD	10	Jun 16, 1941	Benjamin Field Arena, Tampa, Florida, U.S.	
124	Win	106–15–3	Bobby Berry	PTS	10	Mar 26, 1941	Armory, Akron, Ohio, U.S.	
123	Loss	105–15–3	Jimmy Bivins	PTS	10	Mar 5, 1941	Arena, Cleveland, Ohio, U.S.	
122	Win	105–14–3	Lloyd Marshall	PTS	10	Oct 21, 1940	Duquesne Gardens, Pittsburgh, Pennsylvania, U.S.	
121	Win	104–14–3	Bud Mignault	PTS	10	Jun 27, 1940	Patterson Field, East Liverpool, Ohio, U.S.	
120	Win	103–14–3	Jimmy Reeves	SD	10	Apr 15, 1940	Public Hall, Cleveland, Ohio, U.S.	
119	Loss	102–14–3	Turkey Thompson	PTS	10	Mar 26, 1940	Olympic Auditorium, Los Angeles, California, U.S.	
118	Win	102–13–3	Willie Muldune	PTS	10	Feb 29, 1940	Public Hall, Cleveland, Ohio, U.S.	
117	Win	101–13–3	Nate Bolden	PTS	10	Jan 8, 1940	Duquesne Garden, Pittsburgh, Pennsylvania, U.S.	
116	Loss	100–13–3	Lloyd Marshall	PTS	10	Sep 29, 1939	Civic Auditorium, San Francisco, California, U.S.	
115	Loss	100–12–3	Ben Brown	PTS	10	Sep 11, 1939	Ponce de Leon Ballpark, Atlanta, Georgia, U.S.	
114	Loss	100–11–3	Ben Brown	PTS	10	Aug 9, 1939	Ponce de Leon Ballpark, Atlanta, Georgia, U.S.	
113	Win	100–10–3	Al Gainer	PTS	10	Jul 17, 1939	Forbes Field, Pittsburgh, Pennsylvania, U.S.	
112	Win	99–10–3	Archie Moore	UD	10	Apr 20, 1939	Municipal Auditorium, Saint Louis, Missouri, U.S.	
111	Win	98–10–3	Ken Overlin	PTS	10	Mar 27, 1939	Olympiad Arena, Houston, Texas, U.S.	
110	Draw	97–10–3	Erich Seelig	PTS	8	Feb 3, 1939	Madison Square Garden, New York City, New York, U.S.	
109	Win	97–10–2	Ralph DeJohn	PTS	10	Dec 12, 1938	Motor Square Garden, Pittsburgh, Pennsylvania, U.S.	
108	Win	96–10–2	Ralph DeJohn	UD	10	Dec 1, 1938	Convention Hall, Rochester, New York, U.S.	
107	Loss	95–10–2	Ralph DeJohn	MD	8	Nov 11, 1938	Convention Hall, Rochester, New York, U.S.	
106	Win	95–9–2	Oscar Rankins	SD	10	Oct 24, 1938	Motor Square Garden, Pittsburgh, Pennsylvania, U.S.	
105	Win	94–9–2	Jimmy Clark	UD	10	Sep 13, 1938	Convention Hall, Rochester, New York, U.S.	
104	Win	93–9–2	Billy Conn	UD	12	Jul 25, 1938	Forbes Field, Pittsburgh, Pennsylvania, U.S.	
103	Loss	92–9–2	Georgie Abrams	SD	10	Jun 6, 1938	Griffith Stadium, Washington, D.C., U.S.	
102	Win	92–8–2	Al Quaill	UD	10	May 12, 1938	Duquesne Garden, Pittsburgh, Pennsylvania, U.S.	
101	Win	91–8–2	George Black	PTS	10	Apr 26, 1938	Auditorium, Milwaukee, Wisconsin, U.S.	
100	Loss	90–8–2	Carmen Barth	SD	10	Mar 28, 1938	Arena, Cleveland, Ohio, U.S.	
99	Win	90–7–2	Paulie Mahoney	UD	10	Feb 7, 1938	Broadway Auditorium, Buffalo, New York, U.S.	
98	Loss	89–7–2	Carmelo Candel	PTS	10	Dec 9, 1937	Salle Wagram, Paris, France	
97	Loss	89–6–2	Billy Conn	SD	15	Sep 30, 1937	Duquesne Garden, Pittsburgh, Pennsylvania, U.S.	
96	Loss	89–5–2	Billy Conn	SD	12	Jun 30, 1937	Forbes Field, Pittsburgh, Pennsylvania, U.S.	
95	Win	89–4–2	Lou Brouillard	PTS	10	May 7, 1937	Mechanics Building, Boston, Massachusetts, U.S.	
94	Win	88–4–2	Solly Krieger	UD	10	Jan 13, 1937	Hippodrome, New York City, New York, U.S.	
93	Win	87–4–2	Eddie Maguire	PTS	10	Dec 17, 1936	Duquesne Garden, Pittsburgh, Pennsylvania, U.S.	
92	Win	86–4–2	Ken Overlin	UD	10	Nov 4, 1936	Motor Square Garden, Pittsburgh, Pennsylvania, U.S.	
91	Win	85–4–2	Babe Risko	SD	10	Sep 21, 1936	Forbes Field, Pittsburgh, Pennsylvania, U.S.	
90	Win	84–4–2	Young Terry	KO	10 (10)	Aug 12, 1936	Idora Park, Youngstown, Ohio, U.S.	
89	Win	83–4–2	Bob Turner	PTS	10	May 19, 1936	Hickey Park, Millvale, Pennsylvania, U.S.	
88	Loss	82–4–2	Babe Risko	UD	15	Sep 19, 1935	Forbes Field, Pittsburgh, Pennsylvania, U.S.	Lost NYSAC and NBA middleweight titles
87	Win	82–3–2	Oscar Schmeling	KO	3 (10)	Sep 2, 1935	Swiss Park Open Air Arena, Louisville, Kentucky, U.S.	
86	Win	81–3–2	Freddie Sallus	TKO	2 (10)	Jul 30, 1935	Harding Stadium, Steubenville, Ohio, U.S.	
85	Loss	80–3–2	Babe Risko	TKO	7 (10)	Jan 1, 1935	Town Hall, Scranton, Pennsylvania, U.S.	
84	Win	80–2–2	Kid Leonard	PTS	10	Dec 14, 1934	Chicago Stadium, Chicago, Illinois, U.S.	
83	Win	79–2–2	Johnny Phagan	UD	10	Oct 29, 1934	Auditorium, Milwaukee, Wisconsin, U.S.	
82	Win	78–2–2	Vince Dundee	SD	15	Sep 11, 1934	Forbes Field, Pittsburgh, Pennsylvania, U.S.	Won NYSAC and NBA middleweight titles
81	Win	77–2–2	Bud Saltis	PTS	10	Aug 13, 1934	Patterson Field, East Liverpool, Ohio, U.S.	
80	Win	76–2–2	Tait Littman	PTS	10	Jul 18, 1934	Wrigley Field, Chicago, Illinois, U.S.	
79	Win	75–2–2	Pete Latzo	TKO	4 (10)	Jun 5, 1934	Hickey Park, Millvale, Pennsylvania, U.S.	
78	Win	74–2–2	Freddie Heinz	PTS	10	May 18, 1934	Clarksburg, West Virginia, U.S.	
77	Win	73–2–2	Tommy Rios	UD	10	Apr 16, 1934	Canton Auditorium, Canton, Ohio, U.S.	
76	Win	72–2–2	Ben Jeby	PTS	12	Apr 6, 1934	Duquesne Garden, Pittsburgh, Pennsylvania, U.S.	Retained Pennsylvania State middleweight title
75	Win	71–2–2	Jimmy Smith	UD	15	Feb 12, 1934	Motor Square Garden, Pittsburgh, Pennsylvania, U.S.	Retained Pennsylvania State middleweight title
74	Win	70–2–2	Tony D'Alessandro	PTS	10	Dec 11, 1933	Valley Arena, Holyoke, Massachusetts, U.S.	
73	Win	69–2–2	Paul Pirrone	PTS	10	Dec 4, 1933	Public Hall, Cleveland, Ohio, U.S.	
72	Loss	68–2–2	Young Terry	PTS	10	Oct 25, 1933	Newark Armory, Newark, New Jersey, U.S.	
71	Win	68–1–2	Vince Dundee	PTS	10	Sep 18, 1933	Dreamland Park, Newark, New Jersey, U.S.	
70	Win	67–1–2	Vince Dundee	PTS	10	Aug 21, 1933	Forbes Field, Pittsburgh, Pennsylvania, U.S.	Won vacant Pennsylvania State middleweight title
69	Win	66–1–2	Al Rossi	PTS	10	Aug 7, 1933	Dreamland Park, Newark, New Jersey, U.S.	
68	Win	65–1–2	Freddie Polo	KO	5 (10)	Jul 24, 1933	Dreamland Park, Newark, New Jersey, U.S.	
67	Win	64–1–2	Sammy Slaughter	PTS	10	Jun 20, 1933	Public Hall, Cleveland, Ohio, U.S.	
66	Win	63–1–2	Tommy Freeman	UD	10	May 22, 1933	Hickey Park, Millvale, Pennsylvania, U.S.	
65	Win	62–1–2	Andy DiVodi	TKO	5 (10)	Apr 10, 1933	Motor Square Garden, Pittsburgh, Pennsylvania, U.S.	
64	Win	61–1–2	Paulie Walker	PTS	10	Mar 24, 1933	Northside Arena, Pittsburgh, Pennsylvania, U.S.	
63	Win	60–1–2	Eddie Ran	PTS	10	Mar 10, 1933	Olympia Stadium, Detroit, Michigan, U.S.	
62	Draw	59–1–2	Eddie Wolfe	PTS	10	Feb 27, 1933	Motor Square Garden, Pittsburgh, Pennsylvania, U.S.	
61	Loss	59–1–1	Eddie Wolfe	SD	10	Jan 23, 1933	Motor Square Garden, Pittsburgh, Pennsylvania, U.S.	
60	Win	59–0–1	Jackie King	UD	10	Dec 19, 1932	Northside Arena, Pittsburgh, Pennsylvania, U.S.	
59	Win	58–0–1	Jackie King	SD	10	Nov 18, 1932	Northside Arena, Pittsburgh, Pennsylvania, U.S.	
58	Win	57–0–1	Meyer Lichtenstein	PTS	10	Oct 14, 1932	Northside Arena, Pittsburgh, Pennsylvania, U.S.	
57	Draw	56–0–1	Eddie Wolfe	PTS	10	Oct 7, 1932	Madison Square Garden, New York City, New York, U.S.	
56	Win	56–0	Jimmy Belmont	UD	10	Aug 30, 1932	Hickey Park, Millvale, Pennsylvania, U.S.	
55	Win	55–0	Eddie Wolfe	PTS	10	Aug 12, 1932	State Fairgrounds Arena, Detroit, Michigan, U.S.	
54	Win	54–0	Lope Tenorio	UD	10	Jul 22, 1932	Hickey Park, Millvale, Pennsylvania, U.S.	
53	Win	53–0	Johnny Hayes	TKO	8 (10)	Jun 30, 1932	Hickey Park, Millvale, Pennsylvania, U.S.	
52	Win	52–0	Vincent Hambright	UD	10	Apr 11, 1932	Motor Square Garden, Pittsburgh, Pennsylvania, U.S.	
51	Win	51–0	Jimmy Hill	PTS	10	Jan 22, 1932	Arena Gardens, Detroit, Michigan, U.S.	
50	Win	50–0	Jimmy Belmont	PTS	10	Dec 25, 1931	Motor Square Garden, Pittsburgh, Pennsylvania, U.S.	
49	Win	49–0	Jimmy Moinette	PTS	10	Dec 10, 1931	Eagles Hall, East Liverpool, Ohio, U.S.	
48	Win	48–0	Tiger Joe Randall	UD	10	Aug 20, 1931	Hickey Park, Millvale, Pennsylvania, U.S.	
47	Win	47–0	Thomas Lawless	PTS	10	Jul 27, 1931	Meyers Bowl, North Braddock, Pennsylvania, U.S.	
46	Win	46–0	Marty McHale	NWS	10	Jul 15, 1931	American Legion Smoot Lot, Parkersburg, West Virginia, U.S.	
45	Win	45–0	Buck McTiernan	PTS	10	Jul 9, 1931	Hickey Park, Millvale, Pennsylvania, U.S.	
44	Win	44–0	Tommy Rios	PTS	10	Jun 2, 1931	Columbiana Park, East Liverpool, Ohio, U.S.	
43	Win	43–0	Tiger Joe Randall	PTS	10	Apr 16, 1931	Palisades Rink, McKeesport, Pennsylvania, U.S.	
42	Win	42–0	Larry Madge	PTS	10	Apr 8, 1931	State Armory, Oil City, Pennsylvania, U.S.	
41	Win	41–0	Eddie Kaufman	TKO	6 (8)	Mar 23, 1931	Canton Auditorium, Canton, Ohio, U.S.	
40	Win	40–0	Joe Trippe	UD	10	Mar 16, 1931	State Armory, Oil City, Pennsylvania, U.S.	
39	Win	39–0	Tiger Joe Randall	SD	10	Feb 20, 1931	Moose Temple, Pittsburgh, Pennsylvania, U.S.	
38	Win	38–0	Larry Madge	PTS	8	Feb 6, 1931	Nursery Armory, Franklin, Pennsylvania, U.S.	
37	Win	37–0	Mickey Fedor	PTS	10	Jan 30, 1931	Eagles Hall, East Liverpool, Ohio, U.S.	
36	Win	36–0	Jimmy Moinette	PTS	10	Jan 13, 1931	Barnes Auditorium, Alliance, Ohio, U.S.	
35	Win	35–0	Young Rudy	MD	8	Dec 15, 1930	Motor Square Garden, Pittsburgh, Pennsylvania, U.S.	
34	Win	34–0	Jimmy Neal	PTS	10	Nov 28, 1930	Moose Lodge, Pittsburgh, Pennsylvania, U.S.	
33	Win	33–0	Jimmy Belmont	PTS	10	Oct 20, 1930	Knights of Columbus Auditorium, Oil City, Pennsylvania, U.S.	
32	Win	32–0	Benny Burns	TKO	4 (10)	Oct 7, 1930	Eagles Hall, East Liverpool, Ohio, U.S.	
31	Win	31–0	Tiger Joe Randall	PTS	10	Sep 25, 1930	Hickey Park, Millvale, Pennsylvania, U.S.	
30	Win	30–0	Billy Holt	PTS	8	Aug 18, 1930	Meyers Bowl, North Braddock, Pennsylvania, U.S.	
29	Win	29–0	Johnny Rich	PTS	10	Aug 15, 1930	American Legion Arena, Belpre, Ohio, U.S.	
28	Win	28–0	Roger Brooks	PTS	10	Jul 15, 1930	Fouts Brothers Bowl, East Liverpool, Ohio, U.S.	
27	Win	27–0	Jackie Herman	UD	10	Jul 11, 1930	American Legion Arena, Belpre, Ohio, U.S.	
26	Win	26–0	Young Rudy	PTS	10	Jun 12, 1930	Junction Park, New Brighton, Pennsylvania, U.S.	
25	Win	25–0	Jack Murphy	TKO	8 (10)	May 29, 1930	Hickey Park, Millvale, Pennsylvania, U.S.	
24	Win	24–0	Jimmy Herman	TKO	3 (6)	May 14, 1930	Rayen-Wood Auditorium, Youngstown, Ohio, U.S.	
23	Win	23–0	Paul Oger	PTS	6	May 5, 1930	Market House Auditorium, Wheeling, West Virginia, U.S.	
22	Win	22–0	Joe Corelli	PTS	6	May 2, 1930	Moose Lodge, Pittsburgh, Pennsylvania, U.S.	
21	Win	21–0	Young Rudy	UD	10	Apr 28, 1930	The Coliseum, Washington, Pennsylvania, U.S.	
20	Win	20–0	Paul Oger	PTS	8	Apr 8, 1930	Eagles Hall, East Liverpool, Ohio, U.S.	
19	Win	19–0	Young Joe Walcott	PTS	6	Mar 31, 1930	Motor Square Garden, Pittsburgh, Pennsylvania, U.S.	
18	Win	18–0	Hans Roberts	PTS	8	Mar 11, 1930	Eagles Hall, East Liverpool, Ohio, U.S.	
17	Win	17–0	Jimmy McGraw	PTS	6	Feb 10, 1930	Market House Auditorium, Wheeling, West Virginia, U.S.	
16	Win	16–0	Jackie Herman	PTS	6	Jan 30, 1930	Palisades Rink, McKeesport, Pennsylvania, U.S.	
15	Win	15–0	Johnny Popicg	PTS	6	Jan 20, 1930	Market House Auditorium, Wheeling, West Virginia, U.S.	
14	Win	14–0	Johnny Dill	KO	3 (6)	Jan 9, 1930	Eagles Hall, East Liverpool, Ohio, U.S.	
13	Win	13–0	Billy Burke	TKO	3 (6)	Dec 16, 1929	Junction Park, New Brighton, Pennsylvania, U.S.	
12	Win	12–0	Billy Holt	PTS	6	Dec 5, 1929	City Hall Auditorium, Wellsville, Ohio, U.S.	
11	Win	11–0	Billy Yeltz	PTS	6	Nov 21, 1929	City Hall Auditorium, Wellsville, Ohio, U.S.	
10	Win	10–0	Johnny Brown	PTS	6	Nov 11, 1929	Armco Armory, Butler, Pennsylvania, U.S.	
9	Win	9–0	Carl Patron	TKO	4 (6)	Nov 7, 1929	City Hall Auditorium, Wellsville, Ohio, U.S.	
8	Win	8–0	Bob Collura	SD	6	Oct 25, 1929	Moose Lodge, Pittsburgh, Pennsylvania, U.S.	
7	Win	7–0	George Bretch	PTS	6	Sep 5, 1929	Junction Park, New Brighton, Pennsylvania, U.S.	
6	Win	6–0	Young Joe Walcott	PTS	6	Aug 26, 1929	Meyers Bowl, North Braddock, Pennsylvania, U.S.	
5	Win	5–0	Jimmy McDuff	TKO	2 (6)	Aug 22, 1929	Cycler Park, McKeesport, Pennsylvania, U.S.	
4	Win	4–0	Johnny Judd	KO	4 (6)	Aug 10, 1929	McKeesport, Pennsylvania, U.S.	
3	Win	3–0	Jack McCarthy	KO	2 (6)	Jul 11, 1929	Junction Park, New Brighton, Pennsylvania, U.S.	
2	Win	2–0	Johnny Brown	PTS	6	Jun 27, 1929	Junction Park, New Brighton, Pennsylvania, U.S.	
1	Win	1–0	Jackie King	PTS	4	Jun 13, 1929	Junction Park, New Brighton, Pennsylvania, U.S.	

== Titles in boxing ==
=== Major world titles ===
- NYSAC middleweight champion (160 lbs)
- NBA (WBA) middleweight champion (160 lbs)

=== Regional/International titles ===
- Pennsylvania State middleweight champion (160 lbs)

=== Undisputed titles ===
- Undisputed middleweight champion

Awards and achievements
Preceded by Vince Dundee	NYSAC World Middleweight Champion; 11 Sep 1934 – 19 Sep 1935	Succeeded by Eddie (Babe) Risko
Preceded by Vince Dundee	NBA World Middleweight Champion; 11 Sep 1934 – 19 Sep 1935	Succeeded by Eddie (Babe) Risko
