= Eddie Babe Risko =

American boxer (1911–1957)

Babe Risko

Personal information
- Nicknames: Babe Risko, Eddie Risko, Sailor Puleski
- Nationality: American
- Born: Henry L. Pylkowski; July 14, 1911 Syracuse, New York, U.S.
- Died: March 7, 1957 (aged 45) Syracuse, New York, U.S.
- Height: 5 ft 10 in (1.78 m)
- Weight: Middleweight; Light Heavyweight

Boxing career
- Reach: 72 1/2 in (184 cm)
- Stance: Orthodox

Boxing record
- Total fights: 103
- Wins: 65
- Win by KO: 12
- Losses: 26
- Draws: 12

Henry Pylkowski, known in his boxing career as Babe Risko, and Eddie Risko, (July 14, 1911 – March 8, 1957) was a Lithuanian-Polish-American boxer who became Middleweight boxing champion of the world in portions of 1935–36. While boxing in his early career with the US Navy, he was known as Sailor Puleski. He was managed by Gabe Genovese of Syracuse, New York. After winning the World Middleweight Title, his professional career declined rapidly, perhaps because of his lengthy amateur career with the Navy.

== Early life and amateur career ==
Risko was born Henry Pylkowski on July 14, 1911 in Syracuse, New York, the son of a struggling Lithuanian family of five. He attended school in Syracuse. He had a long and impressive amateur boxing career in the United States Navy, which he joined at only 16 in 1927, and fought around 125 matches as Sailor Puleski. Risko won the Navy Middleweight Title in a Panama Bullring in 1931, and was undefeated in his fights with the Navy.

== Professional boxing career ==
=== Risko's rapid rise in the boxing world ===
On New Years Day 1935, bursting on the world scene in a stunning upset, Risko defeated defending World Middleweight Champion Teddy Yarosz in a technical knockout, though the bout was not for the title. Yarosz was down five times before his manager ended the bout early in the seventh round. A crowd of only 2300 witnessed the bout that demonstrated Risko's mastery of the reigning champion.

On January 25, 1935, Risko met the great Vince Dundee, losing in a fifteen round split decision at New York's Madison Square Garden. Due to an error by one of the two judges, Risko was first announced as the winner, but the mistake was soon corrected by boxing commissioners present at the fight. Though Risko's closing rounds were strong and demonstrated his youthful endurance, Dundee's consistent aggressiveness and body punching convinced judges to vote in his favor. The Associated Press gave six rounds to Dundee and four to Risko.

=== Taking the World Middleweight Championship ===
Risko won the NYSAC World Middleweight Title and National Boxing Association World Middleweight Title with a win over Teddy Yarosz on September 19, 1935. Risko knocked Yarosz to the mat twice for counts of nine in the sixth and seventh rounds, and several judges gave Yarosz only the first round. On December 21, 1935 Risko was knocked out in the first round by Jock McAvoy after being floored six times. The match was a non-title bout, with both men weighing in over the 160 pound middleweight limit.

On February 10, 1936, Risko successfully defended his World Middleweight championship for the only time against Tony Fisher in ten rounds in Newark, New Jersey. Risko was awarded eight of the ten rounds in a title bout considered "drab" by some reporters. Only one round was awarded to Fisher, a 21 year old Newark native.

=== Losing the World Middleweight Championship ===
Risko lost the belt on July 11, 1936 to Freddie Steele via a fifteen round unanimous decision in Seattle, Washington before an impressive crowd of 25,000. Steele scored the only knockdown in the bout when he put Risko to the mat with a right to the jaw for a count of six in the first round. Steele damaged both of Risko's eyes during the bout which hampered the reigning champions ability to defend himself. The Associated Press gave Risko only three rounds of the well attended bout.

On February 19, 1937 Risko attempted another shot at the title against Steele at Madison Square Garden but lost in a fifteen around unanimous decision. The Associated Press gave Steele nine rounds, with five to Risko, and one even. The bout, fought before a crowd of 11,600, was described as tedious by many reporters.

== Retirement and life after boxing ==
Risko married Sally Ciborowski of Syracuse in 1936 and eventually had a daughter.

After losing five straight fights by knockout, Risko retired from boxing in 1939, only three years after holding the crown. He recruited for the Navy during WWII and served as Deputy Sheriff in Onondaga County. He later worked as a sales manager for the U. S. Hoffman Machinery Corp. of New York. On March 7, 1957, he died unexpectedly in his sleep in his home in Syracuse at age 46. He was still working for the machinery firm at the time of his death.

== Professional boxing record ==
103 fights	65 wins	26 losses
By knockout	18	12
By decision	47	13
By disqualification	0	1
Draws	12	

No.	Result	Record	Opponent	Type	Round, time	Date	Location	Notes
103	Loss	65–26–12	Lloyd Marshall	KO	5 (10)	May 17, 1939	Memorial Auditorium, Sacramento, California, US	
102	Loss	65–25–12	Walter Franklin	KO	6 (8), 0:49	Feb 7, 1939	New York Coliseum, New York City, New York, US	
101	Loss	65–24–12	Billy Soose	KO	3 (10), 1:47	Oct 5, 1938	Motor Square Garden, Pittsburgh, Pennsylvania, US	
100	Loss	65–23–12	Ben Brown	KO	9 (12)	Sep 26, 1938	Warren Arena, Atlanta, Georgia, US	
99	Loss	65–22–12	Larry Lane	KO	2 (10), 2:46	Sep 19, 1938	Arena, Trenton, New Jersey, US	
98	Draw	65–21–12	Ben Brown	PTS	10	Jul 18, 1938	Warren Arena, Atlanta, Georgia, US	
97	Loss	65–21–11	Ralph DeJohn	KO	7 (8)	Jun 27, 1938	Municipal Stadium, Syracuse, New York, US	
96	Draw	65–20–11	Al Quaill	PTS	10	Jun 6, 1938	Hickey Park, Millvale, Pennsylvania, US	
95	Win	65–20–10	Gorilla Jones	PTS	10	May 10, 1938	Armory, Akron, Ohio, US	
94	Loss	64–20–10	George Black	KO	5 (10), 1:26	Aug 17, 1937	State Fair Park, Milwaukee, Wisconsin, US	
93	Loss	64–19–10	Al Hostak	KO	7 (10)	Jul 13, 1937	Civic Ice Arena, Seattle, Washington, US	
92	Loss	64–18–10	Billy Conn	UD	10	Mar 11, 1937	Duquesne Garden, Pittsburgh, Pennsylvania, US	
91	Loss	64–17–10	Freddie Steele	UD	15	Feb 19, 1937	Madison Square Garden, New York City, New York, US	For NYSAC and NBA middleweight titles
90	Win	64–16–10	Butch Lynch	KO	8 (10)	Dec 18, 1936	Arena, Syracuse, New York, US	
89	Win	63–16–10	Tony Tozzo	UD	10	Nov 27, 1936	Broadway Auditorium, Buffalo, New York, US	
88	Win	62–16–10	Harry Balsamo	UD	10	Oct 28, 1936	Hippodrome, New York City, New York, US	
87	Loss	61–16–10	Teddy Yarosz	SD	10	Sep 21, 1936	Forbes Field, Pittsburgh, Pennsylvania, US	
86	Loss	61–15–10	Freddie Steele	UD	15	Jul 11, 1936	Civic Stadium, Seattle, Washington, US	Lost NYSAC and NBA middleweight titles
85	Loss	61–14–10	Fred Apostoli	PTS	10	May 8, 1936	Dreamland Auditorium, San Francisco, California, US	
84	Win	61–13–10	Mike Payan	PTS	10	Apr 9, 1936	Coliseum, San Diego, California, US	
83	Loss	60–13–10	Freddie Steele	UD	10	Mar 24, 1936	Civic Ice Arena, Seattle, Washington, US	
82	Win	60–12–10	Tony Fisher	PTS	10	Feb 10, 1936	Laurel Garden, Newark, New Jersey, US	Retained NYSAC and NBA middleweight titles
81	Loss	59–12–10	Jock McAvoy	KO	1 (10), 2:48	Dec 20, 1935	Madison Square Garden, New York City, New York, US	
80	Win	59–11–10	Frank Battaglia	SD	10	Dec 9, 1935	Arena, Philadelphia, Pennsylvania, US	
79	Win	58–11–10	Chester Palutis	UD	10	Oct 21, 1935	Town Hall, Scranton, Pennsylvania, US	
78	Win	57–11–10	Jackie Aldare	PTS	10	Oct 4, 1935	Arena, Syracuse, New York, US	
77	Win	56–11–10	Teddy Yarosz	UD	15	Sep 19, 1935	Forbes Field, Pittsburgh, Pennsylvania, US	Won NYSAC and NBA middleweight titles
76	Loss	55–11–10	Paul Pirrone	PTS	10	Jul 8, 1935	Municipal Stadium, Cleveland, Ohio, US	
75	Win	55–10–10	Frank Battaglia	UD	12	May 22, 1935	Motor Square Garden, Pittsburgh, Pennsylvania, US	
74	Loss	54–10–10	Jimmy Belmont	SD	8	Mar 25, 1935	Public Hall, Cleveland, Ohio, US	
73	Win	54–9–10	Sammy Slaughter	PTS	10	Mar 18, 1935	Arena, Philadelphia, Pennsylvania, US	
72	Win	53–9–10	Benny Levine	TKO	2 (10)	Mar 11, 1935	Arena, Syracuse, New York, US	
71	Win	52–9–10	Paul Pirrone	UD	10	Feb 25, 1935	Arena, Philadelphia, Pennsylvania, US	
70	Draw	51–9–10	Solly Dukelsky	PTS	10	Jan 31, 1935	Chicago Stadium, Chicago, Illinois, US	
69	Loss	51–9–9	Vince Dundee	SD	10	Jan 25, 1935	Madison Square Garden, New York City, New York, US	
68	Win	51–8–9	Teddy Yarosz	TKO	7 (10)	Jan 1, 1935	Town Hall, Scranton, Pennsylvania, US	
67	Win	50–8–9	Pete Susky	UD	6	Dec 7, 1934	Town Hall, Scranton, Pennsylvania, US	
66	Win	49–8–9	Al Salbano	PTS	10	Nov 26, 1934	Arena, Syracuse, New York, US	
65	Win	48–8–9	Freddie Sallus	KO	8 (10)	Nov 5, 1934	Arena, Syracuse, New York, US	
64	Win	47–8–9	Weiner Wilch	KO	2 (6)	Oct 26, 1934	Kalurah Temple, Binghamton, New York, US	
63	Win	46–8–9	Chester Palutis	UD	6	Oct 19, 1934	Town Hall, Scranton, Pennsylvania, US	
62	Draw	45–8–9	Freddie Sallus	PTS	8	Oct 15, 1934	Arena, Syracuse, New York, US	
61	Win	45–8–8	Pete Susky	PTS	8	Sep 17, 1934	Arena, Syracuse, New York, US	
60	Win	44–8–8	Weiner Wilch	TKO	3 (8)	Sep 10, 1934	Arena, Syracuse, New York, US	
59	Draw	43–8–8	Larry Wagner	PTS	6	Aug 9, 1934	Johnson Field, Johnson City, New York, US	
58	Win	43–8–7	Joe Desmond	PTS	6	Aug 6, 1934	Convention Hall, Saratoga Springs, New York, US	
57	Draw	42–8–7	Paulie Sykes	SD	6	Jul 18, 1934	South Depot St. Arena, Oswego, New York, US	
56	Win	42–8–6	Thomas Lawless	KO	5 (6)	Jun 8, 1934	Kalurah Temple, Binghamton, New York, US	
55	Win	41–8–6	Thomas Lawless	PTS	6	May 14, 1934	Arena, Syracuse, New York, US	
54	Win	40–8–6	Jackie Flowers	PTS	6	May 7, 1934	Arena, Syracuse, New York, US	
53	Win	39–8–6	Jackie Flowers	PTS	6	Apr 20, 1934	Convention Hall, Utica, New York, US	
52	Win	38–8–6	Joe Lyons	KO	3 (4)	Apr 16, 1934	Arena, Syracuse, New York, US	
51	Win	37–8–6	Jackie Flowers	PTS	6	Apr 3, 1934	Convention Hall, Utica, New York, US	
50	Win	36–8–6	Steve Wolanin	PTS	6	Mar 27, 1934	Convention Hall, Utica, New York, US	
49	Win	35–8–6	Frank LaSpina	KO	2 (4)	Mar 26, 1934	Arena, Syracuse, New York, US	
48	Loss	34–8–6	Swede Berglund	KO	4 (10), 1:18	Jan 12, 1934	Coliseum, San Diego, California, US	
47	Win	34–7–6	Nick Ures	KO	3 (6)	Dec 8, 1933	Coliseum, San Diego, California, US	
46	Win	33–7–6	Johnny 'Bandit' Romero	PTS	10	Oct 20, 1933	Coliseum, San Diego, California, US	
45	Win	32–7–6	Deacon Leo Kelly	PTS	6	Sep 22, 1933	Coliseum, San Diego, California, US	
44	Loss	31–7–6	Dutch Weimer	PTS	4	Sep 3, 1933	Foreign Club Arena, Tijuana, Mexico	
43	Win	31–6–6	Johnny Cavos	TKO	3 (6)	Aug 18, 1933	Coliseum, San Diego, California, US	
42	Win	30–6–6	Ray Griffiths	TKO	3 (6), 2:57	Aug 4, 1933	Coliseum, San Diego, California, US	
41	Win	29–6–6	Miles Murphy	TKO	6 (6)	Jun 15, 1933	Greenwich Coliseum, Tacoma, Washington, US	
40	Win	28–6–6	Guy McKinney	TKO	5 (6)	May 19, 1933	Coliseum, San Diego, California, US	
39	Loss	27–6–6	Grant Willardson	DQ	3 (6)	Mar 10, 1933	Coliseum, San Diego, California, US	
38	Win	27–5–6	Guy McKinney	PTS	6	Mar 3, 1933	Coliseum, San Diego, California, US	
37	Win	26–5–6	Jack O'Neill	PTS	6	Jan 13, 1933	Coliseum, San Diego, California, US	
36	Win	25–5–6	Johnny Reed	PTS	6	Dec 23, 1932	Coliseum, San Diego, California, US	
35	Win	24–5–6	Tony Pena	PTS	4	Nov 4, 1932	Coliseum, San Diego, California, US	
34	Win	23–5–6	Billy McMullen	PTS	6	Oct 7, 1932	Navy Field, San Diego, California, US	
33	Draw	22–5–6	Harry Walton	PTS	4	Sep 16, 1932	Coliseum, San Diego, California, US	
32	Loss	22–5–5	Leroy Brown	KO	6 (10)	Jul 6, 1932	Sullivan's Bowl, Charleston, South Carolina, US	
31	Win	22–4–5	Jack McCarthy	PTS	8	Jun 30, 1932	Freihofer Field, Phillipsburg, New Jersey, US	
30	Win	21–4–5	Vic Suquera	TKO	3 (6)	Jun 23, 1932	Armory, White Plains, New York, US	
29	Win	20–4–5	Joe Smallwood	PTS	6	Apr 14, 1932	New Broadway A.C., Philadelphia, Pennsylvania, US	
28	Loss	19–4–5	Joe Colucci	PTS	8	Feb 26, 1932	106th Infantry Regiment Armory, New York City, New York, US	
27	Win	19–3–5	Chick Williams	PTS	6	Feb 18, 1932	New Broadway A.C., Philadelphia, Pennsylvania, US	
26	Draw	18–3–5	Leroy Brown	PTS	10	Nov 23, 1931	Sullivan's Bowl, Charleston, South Carolina, US	
25	Loss	18–3–4	Rufus Miles	PTS	10	Oct 29, 1931	Fair Grounds Arena, Orangeburg, South Carolina, US	
24	Win	18–2–4	Bud Spittle	PTS	10	Oct 12, 1931	Sullivan's Bowl, Charleston, South Carolina, US	
23	Win	17–2–4	Carl Schlieper	PTS	6	Jun 19, 1931	106th Infantry Regiment Armory, New York City, New York, US	
22	Win	16–2–4	Frank Sumter	PTS	10	May 20, 1931	Sullivan's Bowl, Charleston, South Carolina, US	
21	Loss	15–2–4	Charlie Brown	PTS	10	Jan 6, 1931	Academy of Music, Charleston, South Carolina, US	
20	Draw	15–1–4	Bud Spittle	PTS	10	Dec 19, 1930	Sumter Guards' Armory, Charleston, South Carolina, US	
19	Draw	15–1–3	Rufus Miles	PTS	10	Dec 5, 1930	Citadel Gymnasium, Charleston, South Carolina, US	
18	Win	15–1–2	Larry Leavitt	PTS	10	Nov 27, 1930	Johnson Hagood Stadium, Charleston, South Carolina, US	
17	Win	14–1–2	Rufus Miles	UD	10	Nov 14, 1930	Johnson Hagood Stadium, Charleston, South Carolina, US	
16	Win	13–1–2	Wendell Weeks	PTS	10	Nov 11, 1930	Johnson Hagood Stadium, Charleston, South Carolina, US	
15	Win	12–1–2	Bob Allison	PTS	10	Nov 5, 1930	Ashley Park, Charleston, South Carolina, US	
14	Win	11–1–2	Bob Allison	PTS	10	Oct 27, 1930	Johnson Hagood Stadium, Charleston, South Carolina, US	
13	Win	10–1–2	Larry Leavitt	PTS	10	Oct 17, 1930	Elks Arena, Folly Beach, South Carolina, US	
12	Win	9–1–2	Wendell Weeks	PTS	10	Oct 10, 1930	Elks Arena, Folly Beach, South Carolina, US	
11	Win	8–1–2	Freddy Brewer	KO	4 (6)	Jul 22, 1930	22nd Engineers' Armory, New York City, New York, US	
10	Loss	7–1–2	Eddie Cavanaugh	KO	2 (6)	May 8, 1930	Armory, White Plains, New York, US	
9	Draw	7–0–2	Johnny Baruzzi	PTS	6	Apr 10, 1930	Armory, White Plains, New York, US	
8	Win	7–0–1	Tony Dallas	PTS	6	Mar 27, 1930	Armory, White Plains, New York, US	
7	Win	6–0–1	Roy LaDuca	TKO	3 (6)	Dec 19, 1929	102nd Medical Regiment Armory, New York City, New York, US	
6	Win	5–0–1	Charlie McKain	PTS	4	Dec 12, 1929	Armory, White Plains, New York, US	
5	Draw	4–0–1	Mule Brown	PTS	8	Dec 6, 1929	Flushing Armory, New York City, New York, US	
4	Win	4–0	Roy LaDuca	PTS	6	Dec 5, 1929	102nd Medical Regiment Armory, New York City, New York, US	
3	Win	3–0	Wendell Weeks	PTS	6	Nov 20, 1929	Marion Square Arena, Charleston, South Carolina, US	
2	Win	2–0	Young Murray	TKO	5 (10)	Nov 9, 1929	Marion Square Arena, Charleston, South Carolina, US	
1	Win	1–0	Diaz Music	PTS	4	Oct 26, 1929	Marion Square Arena, Charleston, South Carolina, US	

== Titles in boxing ==
=== Major world titles ===
- NYSAC middleweight champion (160 lbs)
- NBA (WBA) middleweight champion (160 lbs)

=== Undisputed titles ===
- Undisputed middleweight champion

Awards and achievements
Preceded by Teddy Yarosz	NYSAC World Middleweight Champion; 19 September 1935 – 11 July 1936	Succeeded by Freddie Steele
