= Thomas Lawless =

American boxer (1908–1966)

Thomas William Lawless
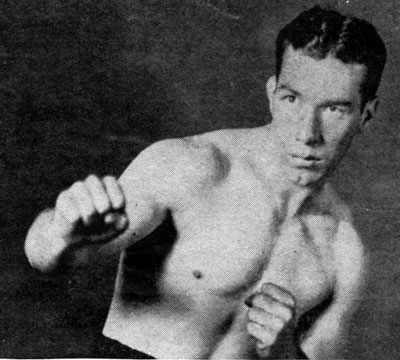

Personal information
- Nicknames: Bucky, The Irish Terrier, The Terror, Uncrowned Welterweight Champion of the World, The Auburn Wildcat
- Born: March 3, 1908 Auburn, New York, U.S.
- Died: June 19, 1966 (aged 58) Ovil, New York, U.S.
- Height: 5 ft 6 in (168 cm)
- Weight: Welterweight, middleweight

Boxing career

Boxing record
- Total fights: 132
- Wins: 78
- Win by KO: 9
- Losses: 47
- Draws: 7

Thomas William Lawless (March 3, 1908 – June 19, 1966), better known as Bucky Lawless, was an American welterweight boxer from Auburn, New York, who fought 131 professional bouts between April 30, 1925, and October 9, 1936. He was known for his hair-trigger left-handed punch. Lawless was one of the first boxers to be approved by the New York State Athletic Commission to box in professional bouts before he was 18 years of age. During Lawless' boxing career, sports writers called him the "Uncrowned Welterweight Champion of the World" by virtue of his non-title victories over four champions.

== Early life ==
Thomas "Bucky" Lawless was born on March 3, 1908, in Auburn, New York. His parents were Martin J. Lawless (1869–1941) and Francis T. Lawless (née O'Brien; 1883–1946). His father was born in Ireland, emigrated to the U.S. in 1882, and worked for the New York Central Railroad, while his mother was born in Ontario, Canada, and emigrated to the U.S. in 1889. Thomas was nicknamed "Bucky" by his friends soon after he began grade school at Holy Family School in Auburn. One of his first jobs was as a newspaper hawker for the Auburn Citizen, which is when he learned to fight in alley brawls with other newsies. Lawless dropped out of junior high school to learn boxing. On September 18, 1924, at 16 years of age, he made his lightweight debut in Moravia, New York, where he fought Red Curry from Binghamton, NY. After three rounds, Lawless was awarded the decision.

== Boxing career ==
Lawless' professional boxing debut occurred on September 28, 1925, when he fought and won against Tony Occipenti at Town Hall, Scranton, PA, by points after six rounds. He won 14 consecutive matches between September 1925 and May 1926, which included winning the Champion Lightweight of Central New York title from Sailor Pacilio (Ralph Rocco Pacilio) on April 12, 1926, at the Syracuse Arena in Syracuse, NY. His first professional loss occurred on May 28, 1926, in the Syracuse Arena, when he lost his match by points against Jackie Brady (Amedio Pizzica) and gave up his title to him. The crowd of over 5,000 did not approve of the judges' decision and jeered. The Auburn Citizen, reporting on the fight, declared that favoritism was shown to Brady by the judges and that Lawless had been robbed of his title. Lawless lost by points in a rematch against Brady on July 16, 1926, at Star Park in Syracuse. The rematch nearly did not occur for several reasons: initially, it was rumored that Lawless and boxer Canastota Bob (Joseph Kanafolo) had been "given a vacation" (suspended) by the New York State Boxing Commission after Lawless and Bob had recently worked in the corners of amateur boxers at a match in Ithaca, NY. Deputy State Commissioner Hodges responded that he would not interfere and that Lawless would be able to fight Brady. After two postponements, Lawless' manager, Edward Epstein, stated that Lawless would be unable to meet the stipulated weight and that taking off too much weight quickly would weaken him, leaving him in no shape to fight. During a scheduled conference, Charlie Celli, Brady's manager, stated that if Lawless did not meet the weight standard, he would consider it a forfeit. Epstein retorted that if another agreement was not reached, he would not permit Lawless to fight. A second conference that Lawless and Brady attended was scheduled the next day. The argument between Epstein and Celli during this conference became so heated that Marc Buckland, president of the Syracuse Arena Athletic Club, had to intervene several times to prevent the two managers from physically fighting each other. After over three hours of negotiations, an agreement was reached and the match was scheduled. Joe Netro of the Syracuse Arena Athletic Club, while speaking with reporters quipped that he was thinking of calling off the upcoming match at Star Park because he had heard there would be a "Lawless element there".

Lawless won the Welterweight Title of Central New York on October 14, 1927, when he defeated Billy Leonard at the Syracuse Arena in six rounds. Bucky carried all the rounds except for the second and fourth. It was called a grudge match after Leonard and his manager were "nasty" to Lawless while in the dressing rooms before the match, calling him a "small town pug" and a "country boy". In the sixth round, Leonard stood in the center of the ring, challenging Lawless to "come on", who accepted and effectively won the sixth round and the bout. Collyer's Eye, a weekly sports journal published in Chicago from 1915 to 1929, ran regularly scheduled articles that rated professional welterweight boxers. Although the rating methodology was not described, the article stated that all factors were taken into consideration in the figures employed and the system gives an accurate slant on a fighter's chances in a bout against another rated boxer. The purpose of the article was to allow readers to view two rated boxers for an upcoming bout and to select the projected winner based on his higher rating. These ratings were officially endorsed by the National Boxing Association and Pennsylvania Commission. Lawless first appeared in the rankings in the 15 October 1927 edition of Collyer's Eye. He was among 122 boxers listed in this edition and they were rated with scores between 109 and 300. Lawless was rated at 239. Of the eight fighters Lawless fought in 1927 who were rated in the same article, Lawless had victories over three fighters who had lower ratings than him (Bobby Richardson, Willie Greb, Eddie Dyer), and a loss against one fighter with a lower rating than him (Eddie Burnbrook). He had victories over two of the fighters who had higher ratings than him (Billy Leonard, Willie Harmon) and a draw with one fighter with a higher rating (Pete August). Lawless lost only one bout in 1927 against a fighter with a higher rating than him (Jack Zivic). In the 3 August 1929 edition of Collyer's Eye and The Baseball World, Bucky Lawless was ranked as Number 8 among "The Ten Best" welterweight fighters in a pool of 184 rated welterweight boxers. In the 19 July 1930 edition of Collyer's Eye and The Baseball World, Lawless was ranked Number 6 among the "Ten Best Welterweights." Lawless continued to rate among the Ten Best Welterweights into 1931.

Lawless fought seven World Welterweight Boxing Champions during his career, but never held the title himself. Sportswriters during this period editorialized about "overweight farces". Robert Edgren, the nationally syndicated American sports reporter, wrote in 1931 that welterweight champions "have been dodging the tough ones by making good contenders come in overweight. And they fought Bucky Lawless without any great success...That old gag again. Making Lawless come in overweight so that [Lou] Brouillard couldn't lose his title" as a response to the ten-round welterweight contest between Lawless and Lou Brouillard at Boston Garden on December 2, 1931, the latter of whom was the world welterweight boxing champion. Although Brouillard won the match by KO in the third round, both fighters came in over the weight limit, so his title was never at risk. Fighting Lawless in a title bout would have been risky for Brouillard because Lawless had appeared in four previous overweight matches and defeated them all. He won decisions over Joe Dundee, Tommy Freeman, and two over Young Jack Thompson (Cecil Lewis Thompson). One of the earlier non-title matches against Thompson was held seven months earlier on May 8, 1931, at Chicago Stadium. Lawless won this match, and although Thompson was the World Welterweight Champion at the time, Lawless was forced to come into the match overweight so that Thompson's title was not at risk. Lawless fought American Middleweight Champion Gorilla Jones (William Landon Jones) six times between 1928 and 1931, defeating him in four of these matches. During his professional boxing career, Lawless fought at venues across the country including Madison Square Garden in Manhattan, Brooklyn, NY; Atlantic City, NJ; Seattle, WA; New Orleans, LA; Cleveland, OH; Detroit, MI; Los Angeles, CA; Chicago, IL; Boston, MA; Pittsburgh, PA; Rochester, NY; and Buffalo, NY. The largest percentage (27%) of his 131 professional matches were fought in Syracuse, NY. By 1927 Lawless was the greatest drawing card for boxing matches in Syracuse.

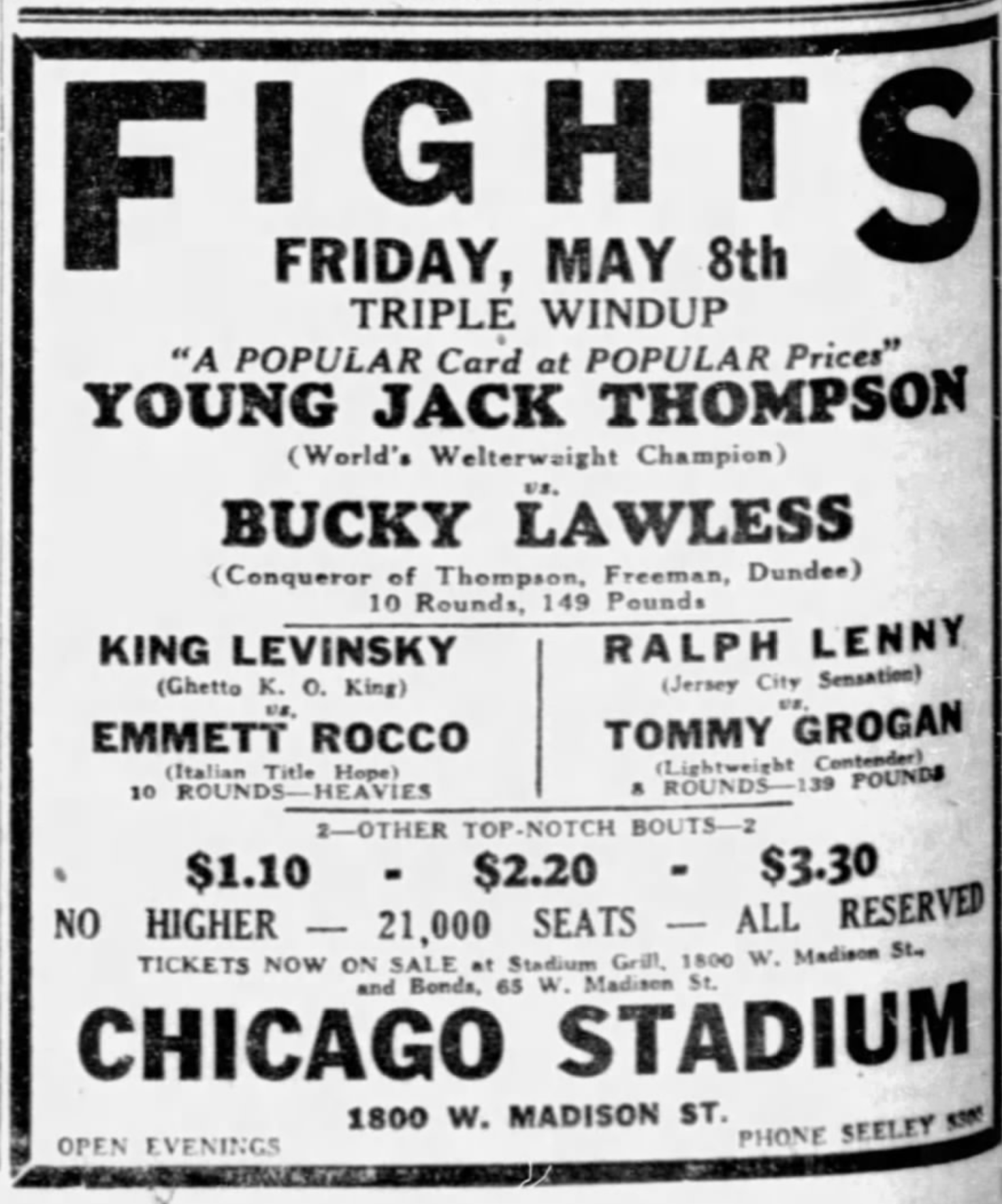
Advertisement for Wiki Article

== Personal life ==
Lawless moved from Auburn, NY, to Syracuse, NY in early 1930. By then he trained in Syracuse, NY, where he was managed by Joe Netro. Lawless married Norma Lila Conlin of Potsdam, NY on March 20, 1930, in Syracuse. The Syracuse Journal wrote an article about the newlywed couple's home life in their apartment at The James, and featured four large at-home photographs with captions, such as Lawless serving coffee, washing dishes, and listening to the new radio with his wife. Lawless moved back to Auburn in 1933.

Lawless was honored by his home city of Auburn, NY on May 13, 1931. A week after his May 8 victory over Young Jack Thompson, he arrived in Auburn shortly after 8:00 p.m. and was met at the Five Points by more than a hundred cars. Lawless sat in an elevated position on his roadster and a parade of three cars abreast escorted him through Fulton Street, Genesee Street, State Street, and Dill Street where the parade ended at the Auburn Fraternal Order of the Eagles. A reception was held in the Eagles Lodge where it was reported that hundreds of fans were turned away because of the limited space. Speakers at the reception included Joseph Hanlon, chairman of the event; John Donavan, City Manager; Syracuse journalists John McGrath and Martin La Chance; and Lawless himself.

After Lawless stopped boxing professionally in 1936, he lived in his hometown of Auburn, NY, where he worked as a laborer for public works and for business owner Thomas J. Hennessy. Lawless stayed active in Auburn local events; for example, he acted as master of ceremonies during a bowling match held in Auburn at the Roman Alleys on March 10, 1940, in which ex-fighters competed against ex-ball players. Lawless died after a long illness at age 58 on June 19, 1966.

== Professional boxing record ==
All information in this section is derived from BoxRec, unless otherwise stated.

=== Official record ===
132 fights	78 wins	46 losses
By knockout	9	22
By decision	68	24
By disqualification	1	0
Draws	6	
Newspaper decisions/draws	2	

All newspaper decisions are officially regarded as “no decision” bouts and are not counted in the win/loss/draw column.

No.	Result	Record	Opponent	Type	Round	Date	Age	Location	Notes
132	Loss	78–46–6 (2)	Buck Potvin	NWS	4	Oct 9, 1936	28 years, 220 days	Punchbowl, Lewiston, Maine, U.S.	
131	Draw	78–46–6 (1)	Walter Kayo Brown	NWS	6	Mar 27, 1936	28 years, 24 days	Waterville, Maine, U.S.	
130	Win	78–46–6	Kid Roberts	TKO	1 (6)	Mar 27, 1936	28 years, 24 days	Waterville, Maine, U.S.	
129	Loss	77–46–6	Sammy Chivas	KO	1 (10)	Aug 16, 1935	27 years, 166 days	Arena Gardens, Detroit, Michigan, U.S.	
128	Loss	77–45–6	Ossie Stewart	KO	2 (10)	Jan 23, 1935	26 years, 326 days	Augusta, Maine, U.S.	
127	Loss	77–44–6	Gus Lesnevich	KO	2 (8)	Jan 12, 1935	26 years, 315 days	Ridgewood Grove, New York City, New York, U.S.	
126	Loss	77–43–6	Eddie Moore	KO	4 (8)	Dec 14, 1934	26 years, 286 days	Bridgeport, Connecticut, U.S.	
125	Loss	77–42–6	Paul Pirrone	KO	2 (10)	Aug 31, 1934	26 years, 181 days	Bader Field, Atlantic City, New Jersey, U.S.	
124	Loss	77–41–6	Freddie Steele	TKO	2 (10)	Jun 29, 1934	26 years, 118 days	Civic Ice Arena, Seattle, Washington, U.S.	
123	Loss	77–40–6	Eddie Babe Risko	KO	5 (6)	Jun 8, 1934	26 years, 97 days	Kalurah Temple, Binghamton, New York, U.S.	
122	Loss	77–39–6	Eddie Babe Risko	PTS	6	May 14, 1934	26 years, 72 days	Arena, Syracuse, New York, U.S.	
121	Loss	77–38–6	Tony Rock	PTS	8	Mar 12, 1934	26 years, 9 days	Odd Fellows' Hall, Albany, New York, U.S.	
120	Loss	77–37–6	Panama Fred Jenkins	PTS	6	Dec 11, 1933	25 years, 283 days	Garden St. Arena, Auburn, New York, U.S.	
119	Loss	77–36–6	Eddie Flynn	PTS	10	Nov 6, 1933	25 years, 248 days	Coliseum Arena, New Orleans, Louisiana, U.S.	
118	Win	77–35–6	Weiner Wilch	PTS	6	Oct 30, 1933	25 years, 241 days	Garden St. Arena, Auburn, New York, U.S.	
117	Loss	76–35–6	Joe Moran	PTS	6	Oct 6, 1933	25 years, 217 days	Arena, Syracuse, New York, U.S.	
116	Loss	76–34–6	Young Terry	KO	5 (10)	Sep 18, 1933	25 years, 199 days	Hobbs' Arena, Shenandoah, Pennsylvania, U.S.	
115	Draw	76–33–6	Joe Thompson	PTS	6	Aug 28, 1933	25 years, 178 days	Arena, Syracuse, New York, U.S.	
114	Loss	76–33–5	Vincent Sireci	PTS	10	Aug 10, 1933	25 years, 160 days	Shewbridge Field, Chicago, Illinois, U.S.	
113	Loss	76–32–5	Freddie Polo	KO	10 (10)	Jun 6, 1933	25 years, 95 days	Dreamland Park, Newark, New Jersey, U.S.	
112	Win	76–31–5	Frankie Hughes	PTS	10	May 22, 1933	25 years, 80 days	Terre Haute, Indiana, U.S.	
111	Loss	75–31–5	Sterling "Six Second" Powell	PTS	8	May 9, 1933	25 years, 67 days	Amusement Academy, Plainfield, New Jersey, U.S.	
110	Draw	75–30–5	Alabama Kid	PTS	10	Mar 23, 1933	25 years, 20 days	Dover, Ohio, U.S.	
109	Win	75–30–4	Marty McHale	PTS	6	Mar 21, 1933	25 years, 18 days	Coliseum, Cleveland, Ohio, U.S.	
108	Draw	74–30–4	Leroy Smith	PTS	10	Dec 16, 1932	24 years, 288 days	Convention Hall, Rochester, New York, U.S.	
107	Loss	74–30–3	Buck McTiernan	PTS	10	Nov 3, 1932	24 years, 245 days	Carney Auditorium, Erie, Pennsylvania, U.S.	
106	Loss	74–29–3	Paulie Walker	KO	6 (10)	Aug 25, 1932	24 years, 175 days	Beach Casino, Asbury Park, New Jersey, U.S.	
105	Loss	74–28–3	Young Terry	PTS	10	Aug 15, 1932	24 years, 165 days	Outdoor High School Field, Trenton, New Jersey, U.S.	
104	Win	74–27–3	Eddie Bojack	PTS	8	Jun 23, 1932	24 years, 112 days	Equestrium, Cleveland, Ohio, U.S.	
103	Loss	73–27–3	Vince Dundee	PTS	10	May 23, 1932	24 years, 81 days	Dreamland Park, Newark, New Jersey, U.S.	
102	Loss	73–26–3	Salvatore Affinito	KO	8 (10)	Apr 25, 1932	24 years, 53 days	Arena, Syracuse, New York, U.S.	
101	Loss	73–25–3	King Tut	UD	10	Mar 7, 1932	24 years, 4 days	Auditorium, Milwaukee, Wisconsin, U.S.	
100	Loss	73–24–3	Leroy Smith	TKO	4 (10)	Jan 1, 1932	23 years, 304 days	Convention Hall, Rochester, New York, U.S.	
99	Loss	73–23–3	Lou Brouillard	KO	3 (10)	Dec 2, 1931	23 years, 274 days	Boston Garden, Boston, Massachusetts, U.S.	
98	Win	73–22–3	Billy Rose	UD	10	Nov 20, 1931	23 years, 262 days	Castle Bowl, New Castle, Pennsylvania, U.S.	
97	Win	72–22–3	Young Harry Wills	PTS	10	Nov 9, 1931	23 years, 251 days	Convention Hall, Rochester, New York, U.S.	
96	Win	71–22–3	Young Harry Wills	PTS	10	Oct 12, 1931	23 years, 223 days	Albany, New York, U.S.	
95	Loss	70–22–3	Jimmy Belmont	UD	10	Sep 8, 1931	23 years, 189 days	Meyers Bowl, North Braddock, Pennsylvania, U.S.	
94	Win	70–21–3	Donald Fagg	PTS	10	Aug 6, 1931	23 years, 156 days	Hickey Park, Millvale, Pennsylvania, U.S.	
93	Loss	69–21–3	Teddy Yarosz	PTS	10	Jul 27, 1931	23 years, 146 days	Meyers Bowl, North Braddock, Pennsylvania, U.S.	
92	Win	69–20–3	Pete August	PTS	10	Jul 15, 1931	23 years, 134 days	Newark, New Jersey, U.S.	
91	Win	68–20–3	Lowell Bobby Brown	PTS	10	Jul 13, 1931	23 years, 132 days	American Legion Stadium, West Springfield, Massachusetts, U.S.	
90	Win	67–20–3	Pete Susky	UD	10	Jul 2, 1931	23 years, 121 days	Kingston Armory, Kingston, Pennsylvania, U.S.	
89	Win	66–20–3	Jackie Horner	PTS	10	Jun 25, 1931	23 years, 114 days	Flint, Michigan, U.S.	
88	Win	65–20–3	Gorilla Jones	PTS	10	May 25, 1931	23 years, 83 days	Chicago Stadium, Chicago, Illinois, U.S.	
87	Win	64–20–3	Young Jack Thompson	MD	10	May 8, 1931	23 years, 66 days	Chicago Stadium, Chicago, Illinois, U.S.	
86	Win	63–20–3	Pete Susky	UD	10	Apr 20, 1931	23 years, 48 days	Motor Square Garden, Pittsburgh, Pennsylvania, U.S.	
85	Win	62–20–3	Sailor Pacilio	TKO	4 (10)	Mar 17, 1931	23 years, 14 days	Majestic Theatre, Utica, New York, U.S.	The bout was halted after round 4
84	Loss	61–20–3	Baby Joe Gans	PTS	10	Feb 27, 1931	22 years, 361 days	Madison Square Garden, New York City, New York, U.S.	
83	Loss	61–19–3	Sam Bruce	SD	10	Feb 9, 1931	22 years, 343 days	Broadway Auditorium, Buffalo, New York, U.S.	
82	Win	61–18–3	Pinky Kaufman	KO	4 (10)	Feb 2, 1931	22 years, 336 days	Convention Hall, Rochester, New York, U.S.	
81	Win	60–18–3	Meyer Lichtenstein	MD	12	Jan 12, 1931	22 years, 315 days	Convention Hall, Rochester, New York, U.S.	
80	Loss	59–18–3	Jackie Fields	KO	5 (10)	Dec 19, 1930	22 years, 291 days	Olympia Stadium, Detroit, Michigan, U.S.	
79	Win	59–17–3	Gene Cardi	TKO	9 (10)	Dec 12, 1930	22 years, 284 days	Carney Auditorium, Erie, Pennsylvania, U.S.	
78	Win	58–17–3	Billy Townsend	PTS	10	Nov 21, 1930	22 years, 263 days	Olympia Stadium, Detroit, Michigan, U.S.	
77	Win	57–17–3	Paul Pirrone	PTS	10	Nov 10, 1930	22 years, 252 days	Motor Square Garden, Pittsburgh, Pennsylvania, U.S.	
76	Win	56–17–3	Jackie Horner	PTS	10	Nov 3, 1930	22 years, 245 days	Convention Hall, Rochester, New York, U.S.	
75	Win	55–17–3	Buck McTiernan	MD	10	Oct 20, 1930	22 years, 231 days	Motor Square Garden, Pittsburgh, Pennsylvania, U.S.	
74	Draw	54–17–3	Jackie Brady	PTS	10	Sep 30, 1930	22 years, 211 days	State Fair Coliseum, Syracuse, New York, U.S.	
73	Loss	54–17–2	Sammy Jackson	TKO	9 (10)	Sep 2, 1930	22 years, 183 days	Olympic Auditorium, Los Angeles, California, U.S.	
72	Win	54–16–2	Babe Anderson	PTS	10	Aug 15, 1930	22 years, 165 days	Legion Stadium, Hollywood, California, U.S.	
71	Loss	53–16–2	Gorilla Jones	KO	9 (10)	Jul 18, 1930	22 years, 137 days	Dreamland Auditorium, San Francisco, California, U.S.	
70	Win	53–15–2	Meyer Lichtenstein	PTS	10	Jun 23, 1930	22 years, 112 days	Edgerton Park Arena, Rochester, New York, U.S.	
69	Win	52–15–2	Harry Mason	PTS	10	Jun 10, 1930	22 years, 99 days	Heywood Arena, West Springfield, Massachusetts, U.S.	
68	Win	51–15–2	Gorilla Jones	PTS	10	May 12, 1930	22 years, 70 days	Valley Arena, Holyoke, Massachusetts, U.S.	
67	Win	50–15–2	Joe Dundee	UD	10	Apr 14, 1930	22 years, 42 days	Convention Hall, Rochester, New York, U.S.	
66	Win	49–15–2	Sergeant Sammy Baker	PTS	10	Mar 17, 1930	22 years, 14 days	Convention Hall, Rochester, New York, U.S.	
65	Loss	48–15–2	Vince Dundee	PTS	10	Feb 21, 1930	21 years, 355 days	Madison Square Garden, New York City, New York, U.S.	
64	Win	48–14–2	Young Jack Thompson	MD	10	Feb 3, 1930	21 years, 337 days	Convention Hall, Rochester, U.S.	
63	Loss	47–14–2	Tommy Freeman	KO	7 (10)	Oct 25, 1929	21 years, 236 days	Erie, Pennsylvania, U.S.	
62	Loss	47–13–2	Young Corbett III	KO	1 (10)	Aug 30, 1929	21 years, 180 days	Dreamland Auditorium, San Francisco, California, U.S.	
61	Win	47–12–2	Tommy Freeman	PTS	10	Aug 21, 1929	21 years, 171 days	Taylor Bowl, Newburgh Heights, Ohio, U.S.	
60	Win	46–12–2	Gorilla Jones	PTS	12	Jul 16, 1929	21 years, 135 days	Taylor Bowl, Newburgh Heights, Ohio, U.S.	
59	Win	45–12–2	Bruce Flowers	PTS	10	Jun 21, 1929	21 years, 110 days	Arena, Syracuse, New York, U.S.	
58	Loss	44–12–2	Vince Dundee	PTS	10	May 28, 1929	21 years, 86 days	Taylor Bowl, Newburgh Heights, Ohio, U.S.	
57	Loss	44–11–2	Jimmy Goodrich	PTS	10	May 6, 1929	21 years, 64 days	Broadway Auditorium, Buffalo, New York, U.S.	
56	Win	44–10–2	Sam Bruce	PTS	8	Apr 26, 1929	21 years, 54 days	Broadway Auditorium, Buffalo, New York, U.S.	
55	Win	43–10–2	Willie Lavin	PTS	10	Mar 18, 1929	21 years, 15 days	Broadway Auditorium, Buffalo, New York, U.S.	
54	Win	42–10–2	Gorilla Jones	PTS	10	Feb 18, 1929	20 years, 352 days	Broadway Auditorium, Buffalo, New York, U.S.	
53	Draw	41–10–2	Jackie Horner	PTS	8	Feb 4, 1929	20 years, 338 days	Broadway Auditorium, Buffalo, New York, U.S.	
52	Win	41–10–1	Jackie Horner	PTS	10	Jan 21, 1929	20 years, 324 days	Broadway Auditorium, Buffalo, New York, U.S.	
51	Win	40–10–1	Canada Lee	DQ	3 (10)	Dec 12, 1928	20 years, 279 days	Erie, Pennsylvania, U.S.	
50	Win	39–10–1	Young Saylor	PTS	10	Nov 19, 1928	20 years, 261 days	State Armory, Oil City, Pennsylvania, U.S.	
49	Loss	38–10–1	Gorilla Jones	PTS	10	Oct 19, 1928	20 years, 230 days	Erie, Pennsylvania, U.S.	
48	Loss	38–9–1	Canada Lee	KO	3 (10)	Oct 12, 1928	20 years, 223 days	Arena, Syracuse, New York, U.S.	
47	Win	38–8–1	Meyer Grace	PTS	6	Sep 3, 1928	20 years, 184 days	Carney Auditorium, Erie, Pennsylvania, U.S.	
46	Win	37–8–1	Larry Marinucci	TKO	10 (10)	Aug 31, 1928	20 years, 181 days	Arena, Syracuse, New York, U.S.	
45	Win	36–8–1	Young Saylor	PTS	10	Jul 23, 1928	20 years, 142 days	Lake Conneaut, Pennsylvania, U.S.	
44	Win	35–8–1	Jack Berry	PTS	10	Jun 29, 1928	20 years, 118 days	Erie, Pennsylvania, U.S.	
43	Win	34–8–1	Johnny Piai	PTS	10	May 25, 1928	20 years, 83 days	Erie, Pennsylvania, U.S.	
42	Loss	33–8–1	Sammy Vogel	PTS	10	May 18, 1928	20 years, 76 days	Arena, Syracuse, New York, U.S.	
41	Loss	33–7–1	Sammy Vogel	PTS	10	Apr 20, 1928	20 years, 48 days	Arena, Syracuse, New York, U.S.	
40	Win	33–6–1	Jack Manley	PTS	10	Mar 23, 1928	20 years, 20 days	Arena, Syracuse, New York, U.S.	
39	Win	32–6–1	Jack Sparr	PTS	6	Feb 3, 1928	19 years, 337 days	Arena, Syracuse, New York, U.S.	
38	Loss	31–6–1	Jack Sparr	PTS	10	Jan 20, 1928	19 years, 323 days	Coliseum, Chicago, Illinois, U.S.	
37	Draw	31–5–1	Pete August	PTS	6	Dec 9, 1927	19 years, 281 days	Arena, Syracuse, New York, U.S.	
36	Win	31–5	Cuddy DeMarco	PTS	10	Dec 2, 1927	19 years, 274 days	Erie, Pennsylvania, U.S.	
35	Win	30–5	Willie Harmon	PTS	6	Nov 4, 1927	19 years, 246 days	Arena, Syracuse, New York, U.S.	
34	Win	29–5	Billy Leonard	PTS	6	Oct 14, 1927	19 years, 225 days	Arena, Syracuse, New York, U.S.	
33	Win	28–5	Eddie Dyer	PTS	10	Oct 7, 1927	19 years, 218 days	Erie, Pennsylvania, U.S.	
32	Win	27–5	Joe Saviola	PTS	6	Sep 30, 1927	19 years, 211 days	Arena, Syracuse, New York, U.S.	
31	Win	26–5	Willie Greb	PTS	6	Sep 2, 1927	19 years, 183 days	Arena, Syracuse, New York, U.S.	
30	Win	25–5	Sailor Pacilio	PTS	6	Jun 3, 1927	19 years, 92 days	Arena, Syracuse, New York, U.S.	
29	Loss	24–5	Jack Zivic	KO	6 (10)	May 2, 1927	19 years, 60 days	Carney Auditorium, Erie, Pennsylvania, U.S.	
28	Loss	24–4	Eddie Burnbrook	KO	2 (10)	Apr 11, 1927	19 years, 39 days	Erie, Pennsylvania, U.S.	
27	Win	24–3	Sammy Marco	PTS	6	Mar 18, 1927	19 years, 15 days	Arena, Syracuse, New York, U.S.	
26	Win	23–3	Johnny Carey	KO	5 (10)	Mar 11, 1927	19 years, 8 days	Erie, Pennsylvania, U.S.	
25	Win	22–3	Bobby Richardson	PTS	10	Feb 22, 1927	18 years, 356 days	Majestic Theatre, Williamsport, Pennsylvania, U.S.	
24	Win	21–3	Dave Forbes	TKO	7 (10)	Feb 11, 1927	18 years, 345 days	Erie, Pennsylvania, U.S.	
23	Win	20–3	Dorey Shimar	PTS	10	Jan 28, 1927	18 years, 331 days	Erie, Pennsylvania, U.S.	
22	Win	19–3	Dorey Shimar	PTS	6	Jan 21, 1927	18 years, 324 days	Arena, Syracuse, New York, U.S.	
21	Loss	18–3	Eddie Burnbrook	KO	3 (10)	Dec 30, 1926	18 years, 302 days	Arena, Syracuse, New York, U.S.	
20	Win	18–2	Jackie Horner	PTS	6	Dec 15, 1926	18 years, 287 days	Arena, Syracuse, New York, U.S.	
19	Win	17–2	Canastota Bob	PTS	6	Nov 26, 1926	18 years, 268 days	Arena, Syracuse, New York, U.S.	
18	Win	16–2	Kid Savage	PTS	6	Oct 29, 1926	18 years, 240 days	Arena, Syracuse, New York, U.S.	
17	Win	15–2	Pinky Burns	PTS	6	Jul 28, 1926	18 years, 147 days	Johnson Field, Johnson City, New York, U.S.	
16	Loss	14–2	Jackie Brady	PTS	6	Jul 16, 1926	18 years, 105 days	Star Park, Syracuse, New York, U.S.	
15	Loss	14–1	Jackie Brady	PTS	6	May 28, 1926	18 years, 86 days	Arena, Syracuse, New York, U.S.	For Central New York lightweight title
14	Win	14–0	Johnny Sacco	PTS	6	May 21, 1926	18 years, 79 days	Arena, Syracuse, New York, U.S.	
13	Win	13–0	Sailor Pacilio	PTS	6	Apr 12, 1926	18 years, 40 days	Arena, Syracuse, New York, U.S.	
12	Win	12–0	Teddy Dean	PTS	6	Mar 26, 1926	18 years, 23 days	Arena, Syracuse, New York, U.S.	
11	Win	11–0	Bobby Tracey	PTS	6	Mar 12, 1926	18 years, 9 days	Arena, Syracuse, New York, U.S.	
10	Win	10–0	Ralph Miles	TKO	4 (6)	Feb 12, 1926	17 years, 346 days	Arena, Syracuse, New York, U.S.	
9	Win	9–0	Johnny Beach	PTS	6	Jan 22, 1926	17 years, 325 days	Arena, Syracuse, New York, U.S.	
8	Win	8–0	Kid Savage	PTS	6	Jan 18, 1926	17 years, 321 days	Convention Hall, Rochester, New York, U.S.	
7	Win	7–0	Canastota Bob	PTS	6	Dec 4, 1925	17 years, 276 days	Arena, Syracuse, New York, U.S.	
6	Win	6–0	Battling Klem	PTS	?	Nov 26, 1925	17 years, 268 days	Arena, Syracuse, New York, U.S.	
5	Win	5–0	Harry Webber	PTS	4	Nov 11, 1925	17 years, 253 days	Arena, Syracuse, New York, U.S.	
4	Win	4–0	Willie Devanney	PTS	6	Nov 9, 1925	17 years, 251 days	Town Hall, Scranton, Pennsylvania, U.S.	
3	Win	3–0	Willie Devanney	PTS	6	Oct 12, 1925	17 years, 223 days	Town Hall, Scranton, Pennsylvania, U.S.	
2	Win	2–0	Billy Gray	KO	5 (6)	Oct 1, 1925	17 years, 212 days	United States of America	
1	Win	1–0	Tony Occipenti	PTS	6	Sep 28, 1925	17 years, 209 days	Town Hall, Scranton, Pennsylvania, U.S.	Professional debut

=== Unofficial record ===
132 fights	78 wins	47 losses
By knockout	9	22
By decision	68	25
By disqualification	1	0
Draws	7	

Record with the inclusion of newspaper decisions in the win/loss/draw column.

No.	Result	Record	Opponent	Type	Round	Date	Age	Location	Notes
132	Loss	78–47–7	Buck Potvin	NWS	4	Oct 9, 1936	28 years, 220 days	Punchbowl, Lewiston, Maine, U.S.	
131	Draw	78–46–7	Walter Kayo Brown	NWS	6	Mar 27, 1936	28 years, 24 days	Waterville, Maine, U.S.	
130	Win	78–46–6	Kid Roberts	TKO	1 (6)	Mar 27, 1936	28 years, 24 days	Waterville, Maine, U.S.	
129	Loss	77–46–6	Sammy Chivas	KO	1 (10)	Aug 16, 1935	27 years, 166 days	Arena Gardens, Detroit, Michigan, U.S.	
128	Loss	77–45–6	Ossie Stewart	KO	2 (10)	Jan 23, 1935	26 years, 326 days	Augusta, Maine, U.S.	
127	Loss	77–44–6	Gus Lesnevich	KO	2 (8)	Jan 12, 1935	26 years, 315 days	Ridgewood Grove, New York City, New York, U.S.	
126	Loss	77–43–6	Eddie Moore	KO	4 (8)	Dec 14, 1934	26 years, 286 days	Bridgeport, Connecticut, U.S.	
125	Loss	77–42–6	Paul Pirrone	KO	2 (10)	Aug 31, 1934	26 years, 181 days	Bader Field, Atlantic City, New Jersey, U.S.	
124	Loss	77–41–6	Freddie Steele	TKO	2 (10)	Jun 29, 1934	26 years, 118 days	Civic Ice Arena, Seattle, Washington, U.S.	
123	Loss	77–40–6	Eddie Babe Risko	KO	5 (6)	Jun 8, 1934	26 years, 97 days	Kalurah Temple, Binghamton, New York, U.S.	
122	Loss	77–39–6	Eddie Babe Risko	PTS	6	May 14, 1934	26 years, 72 days	Arena, Syracuse, New York, U.S.	
121	Loss	77–38–6	Tony Rock	PTS	8	Mar 12, 1934	26 years, 9 days	Odd Fellows' Hall, Albany, New York, U.S.	
120	Loss	77–37–6	Panama Fred Jenkins	PTS	6	Dec 11, 1933	25 years, 283 days	Garden St. Arena, Auburn, New York, U.S.	
119	Loss	77–36–6	Eddie Flynn	PTS	10	Nov 6, 1933	25 years, 248 days	Coliseum Arena, New Orleans, Louisiana, U.S.	
118	Win	77–35–6	Weiner Wilch	PTS	6	Oct 30, 1933	25 years, 241 days	Garden St. Arena, Auburn, New York, U.S.	
117	Loss	76–35–6	Joe Moran	PTS	6	Oct 6, 1933	25 years, 217 days	Arena, Syracuse, New York, U.S.	
116	Loss	76–34–6	Young Terry	KO	5 (10)	Sep 18, 1933	25 years, 199 days	Hobbs' Arena, Shenandoah, Pennsylvania, U.S.	
115	Draw	76–33–6	Joe Thompson	PTS	6	Aug 28, 1933	25 years, 178 days	Arena, Syracuse, New York, U.S.	
114	Loss	76–33–5	Vincent Sireci	PTS	10	Aug 10, 1933	25 years, 160 days	Shewbridge Field, Chicago, Illinois, U.S.	
113	Loss	76–32–5	Freddie Polo	KO	10 (10)	Jun 6, 1933	25 years, 95 days	Dreamland Park, Newark, New Jersey, U.S.	
112	Win	76–31–5	Frankie Hughes	PTS	10	May 22, 1933	25 years, 80 days	Terre Haute, Indiana, U.S.	
111	Loss	75–31–5	Sterling "Six Second" Powell	PTS	8	May 9, 1933	25 years, 67 days	Amusement Academy, Plainfield, New Jersey, U.S.	
110	Draw	75–30–5	Alabama Kid	PTS	10	Mar 23, 1933	25 years, 20 days	Dover, Ohio, U.S.	
109	Win	75–30–4	Marty McHale	PTS	6	Mar 21, 1933	25 years, 18 days	Coliseum, Cleveland, Ohio, U.S.	
108	Draw	74–30–4	Leroy Smith	PTS	10	Dec 16, 1932	24 years, 288 days	Convention Hall, Rochester, New York, U.S.	
107	Loss	74–30–3	Buck McTiernan	PTS	10	Nov 3, 1932	24 years, 245 days	Carney Auditorium, Erie, Pennsylvania, U.S.	
106	Loss	74–29–3	Paulie Walker	KO	6 (10)	Aug 25, 1932	24 years, 175 days	Beach Casino, Asbury Park, New Jersey, U.S.	
105	Loss	74–28–3	Young Terry	PTS	10	Aug 15, 1932	24 years, 165 days	Outdoor High School Field, Trenton, New Jersey, U.S.	
104	Win	74–27–3	Eddie Bojack	PTS	8	Jun 23, 1932	24 years, 112 days	Equestrium, Cleveland, Ohio, U.S.	
103	Loss	73–27–3	Vince Dundee	PTS	10	May 23, 1932	24 years, 81 days	Dreamland Park, Newark, New Jersey, U.S.	
102	Loss	73–26–3	Salvatore Affinito	KO	8 (10)	Apr 25, 1932	24 years, 53 days	Arena, Syracuse, New York, U.S.	
101	Loss	73–25–3	King Tut	UD	10	Mar 7, 1932	24 years, 4 days	Auditorium, Milwaukee, Wisconsin, U.S.	
100	Loss	73–24–3	Leroy Smith	TKO	4 (10)	Jan 1, 1932	23 years, 304 days	Convention Hall, Rochester, New York, U.S.	
99	Loss	73–23–3	Lou Brouillard	KO	3 (10)	Dec 2, 1931	23 years, 274 days	Boston Garden, Boston, Massachusetts, U.S.	
98	Win	73–22–3	Billy Rose	UD	10	Nov 20, 1931	23 years, 262 days	Castle Bowl, New Castle, Pennsylvania, U.S.	
97	Win	72–22–3	Young Harry Wills	PTS	10	Nov 9, 1931	23 years, 251 days	Convention Hall, Rochester, New York, U.S.	
96	Win	71–22–3	Young Harry Wills	PTS	10	Oct 12, 1931	23 years, 223 days	Albany, New York, U.S.	
95	Loss	70–22–3	Jimmy Belmont	UD	10	Sep 8, 1931	23 years, 189 days	Meyers Bowl, North Braddock, Pennsylvania, U.S.	
94	Win	70–21–3	Donald Fagg	PTS	10	Aug 6, 1931	23 years, 156 days	Hickey Park, Millvale, Pennsylvania, U.S.	
93	Loss	69–21–3	Teddy Yarosz	PTS	10	Jul 27, 1931	23 years, 146 days	Meyers Bowl, North Braddock, Pennsylvania, U.S.	
92	Win	69–20–3	Pete August	PTS	10	Jul 15, 1931	23 years, 134 days	Newark, New Jersey, U.S.	
91	Win	68–20–3	Lowell Bobby Brown	PTS	10	Jul 13, 1931	23 years, 132 days	American Legion Stadium, West Springfield, Massachusetts, U.S.	
90	Win	67–20–3	Pete Susky	UD	10	Jul 2, 1931	23 years, 121 days	Kingston Armory, Kingston, Pennsylvania, U.S.	
89	Win	66–20–3	Jackie Horner	PTS	10	Jun 25, 1931	23 years, 114 days	Flint, Michigan, U.S.	
88	Win	65–20–3	Gorilla Jones	PTS	10	May 25, 1931	23 years, 83 days	Chicago Stadium, Chicago, Illinois, U.S.	
87	Win	64–20–3	Young Jack Thompson	MD	10	May 8, 1931	23 years, 66 days	Chicago Stadium, Chicago, Illinois, U.S.	
86	Win	63–20–3	Pete Susky	UD	10	Apr 20, 1931	23 years, 48 days	Motor Square Garden, Pittsburgh, Pennsylvania, U.S.	
85	Win	62–20–3	Sailor Pacilio	TKO	4 (10)	Mar 17, 1931	23 years, 14 days	Majestic Theatre, Utica, New York, U.S.	The bout was halted after round 4
84	Loss	61–20–3	Baby Joe Gans	PTS	10	Feb 27, 1931	22 years, 361 days	Madison Square Garden, New York City, New York, U.S.	
83	Loss	61–19–3	Sam Bruce	SD	10	Feb 9, 1931	22 years, 343 days	Broadway Auditorium, Buffalo, New York, U.S.	
82	Win	61–18–3	Pinky Kaufman	KO	4 (10)	Feb 2, 1931	22 years, 336 days	Convention Hall, Rochester, New York, U.S.	
81	Win	60–18–3	Meyer Lichtenstein	MD	12	Jan 12, 1931	22 years, 315 days	Convention Hall, Rochester, New York, U.S.	
80	Loss	59–18–3	Jackie Fields	KO	5 (10)	Dec 19, 1930	22 years, 291 days	Olympia Stadium, Detroit, Michigan, U.S.	
79	Win	59–17–3	Gene Cardi	TKO	9 (10)	Dec 12, 1930	22 years, 284 days	Carney Auditorium, Erie, Pennsylvania, U.S.	
78	Win	58–17–3	Billy Townsend	PTS	10	Nov 21, 1930	22 years, 263 days	Olympia Stadium, Detroit, Michigan, U.S.	
77	Win	57–17–3	Paul Pirrone	PTS	10	Nov 10, 1930	22 years, 252 days	Motor Square Garden, Pittsburgh, Pennsylvania, U.S.	
76	Win	56–17–3	Jackie Horner	PTS	10	Nov 3, 1930	22 years, 245 days	Convention Hall, Rochester, New York, U.S.	
75	Win	55–17–3	Buck McTiernan	MD	10	Oct 20, 1930	22 years, 231 days	Motor Square Garden, Pittsburgh, Pennsylvania, U.S.	
74	Draw	54–17–3	Jackie Brady	PTS	10	Sep 30, 1930	22 years, 211 days	State Fair Coliseum, Syracuse, New York, U.S.	
73	Loss	54–17–2	Sammy Jackson	TKO	9 (10)	Sep 2, 1930	22 years, 183 days	Olympic Auditorium, Los Angeles, California, U.S.	
72	Win	54–16–2	Babe Anderson	PTS	10	Aug 15, 1930	22 years, 165 days	Legion Stadium, Hollywood, California, U.S.	
71	Loss	53–16–2	Gorilla Jones	KO	9 (10)	Jul 18, 1930	22 years, 137 days	Dreamland Auditorium, San Francisco, California, U.S.	
70	Win	53–15–2	Meyer Lichtenstein	PTS	10	Jun 23, 1930	22 years, 112 days	Edgerton Park Arena, Rochester, New York, U.S.	
69	Win	52–15–2	Harry Mason	PTS	10	Jun 10, 1930	22 years, 99 days	Heywood Arena, West Springfield, Massachusetts, U.S.	
68	Win	51–15–2	Gorilla Jones	PTS	10	May 12, 1930	22 years, 70 days	Valley Arena, Holyoke, Massachusetts, U.S.	
67	Win	50–15–2	Joe Dundee	UD	10	Apr 14, 1930	22 years, 42 days	Convention Hall, Rochester, New York, U.S.	
66	Win	49–15–2	Sergeant Sammy Baker	PTS	10	Mar 17, 1930	22 years, 14 days	Convention Hall, Rochester, New York, U.S.	
65	Loss	48–15–2	Vince Dundee	PTS	10	Feb 21, 1930	21 years, 355 days	Madison Square Garden, New York City, New York, U.S.	
64	Win	48–14–2	Young Jack Thompson	MD	10	Feb 3, 1930	21 years, 337 days	Convention Hall, Rochester, U.S.	
63	Loss	47–14–2	Tommy Freeman	KO	7 (10)	Oct 25, 1929	21 years, 236 days	Erie, Pennsylvania, U.S.	
62	Loss	47–13–2	Young Corbett III	KO	1 (10)	Aug 30, 1929	21 years, 180 days	Dreamland Auditorium, San Francisco, California, U.S.	
61	Win	47–12–2	Tommy Freeman	PTS	10	Aug 21, 1929	21 years, 171 days	Taylor Bowl, Newburgh Heights, Ohio, U.S.	
60	Win	46–12–2	Gorilla Jones	PTS	12	Jul 16, 1929	21 years, 135 days	Taylor Bowl, Newburgh Heights, Ohio, U.S.	
59	Win	45–12–2	Bruce Flowers	PTS	10	Jun 21, 1929	21 years, 110 days	Arena, Syracuse, New York, U.S.	
58	Loss	44–12–2	Vince Dundee	PTS	10	May 28, 1929	21 years, 86 days	Taylor Bowl, Newburgh Heights, Ohio, U.S.	
57	Loss	44–11–2	Jimmy Goodrich	PTS	10	May 6, 1929	21 years, 64 days	Broadway Auditorium, Buffalo, New York, U.S.	
56	Win	44–10–2	Sam Bruce	PTS	8	Apr 26, 1929	21 years, 54 days	Broadway Auditorium, Buffalo, New York, U.S.	
55	Win	43–10–2	Willie Lavin	PTS	10	Mar 18, 1929	21 years, 15 days	Broadway Auditorium, Buffalo, New York, U.S.	
54	Win	42–10–2	Gorilla Jones	PTS	10	Feb 18, 1929	20 years, 352 days	Broadway Auditorium, Buffalo, New York, U.S.	
53	Draw	41–10–2	Jackie Horner	PTS	8	Feb 4, 1929	20 years, 338 days	Broadway Auditorium, Buffalo, New York, U.S.	
52	Win	41–10–1	Jackie Horner	PTS	10	Jan 21, 1929	20 years, 324 days	Broadway Auditorium, Buffalo, New York, U.S.	
51	Win	40–10–1	Canada Lee	DQ	3 (10)	Dec 12, 1928	20 years, 279 days	Erie, Pennsylvania, U.S.	
50	Win	39–10–1	Young Saylor	PTS	10	Nov 19, 1928	20 years, 261 days	State Armory, Oil City, Pennsylvania, U.S.	
49	Loss	38–10–1	Gorilla Jones	PTS	10	Oct 19, 1928	20 years, 230 days	Erie, Pennsylvania, U.S.	
48	Loss	38–9–1	Canada Lee	KO	3 (10)	Oct 12, 1928	20 years, 223 days	Arena, Syracuse, New York, U.S.	
47	Win	38–8–1	Meyer Grace	PTS	6	Sep 3, 1928	20 years, 184 days	Carney Auditorium, Erie, Pennsylvania, U.S.	
46	Win	37–8–1	Larry Marinucci	TKO	10 (10)	Aug 31, 1928	20 years, 181 days	Arena, Syracuse, New York, U.S.	
45	Win	36–8–1	Young Saylor	PTS	10	Jul 23, 1928	20 years, 142 days	Lake Conneaut, Pennsylvania, U.S.	
44	Win	35–8–1	Jack Berry	PTS	10	Jun 29, 1928	20 years, 118 days	Erie, Pennsylvania, U.S.	
43	Win	34–8–1	Johnny Piai	PTS	10	May 25, 1928	20 years, 83 days	Erie, Pennsylvania, U.S.	
42	Loss	33–8–1	Sammy Vogel	PTS	10	May 18, 1928	20 years, 76 days	Arena, Syracuse, New York, U.S.	
41	Loss	33–7–1	Sammy Vogel	PTS	10	Apr 20, 1928	20 years, 48 days	Arena, Syracuse, New York, U.S.	
40	Win	33–6–1	Jack Manley	PTS	10	Mar 23, 1928	20 years, 20 days	Arena, Syracuse, New York, U.S.	
39	Win	32–6–1	Jack Sparr	PTS	6	Feb 3, 1928	19 years, 337 days	Arena, Syracuse, New York, U.S.	
38	Loss	31–6–1	Jack Sparr	PTS	10	Jan 20, 1928	19 years, 323 days	Coliseum, Chicago, Illinois, U.S.	
37	Draw	31–5–1	Pete August	PTS	6	Dec 9, 1927	19 years, 281 days	Arena, Syracuse, New York, U.S.	
36	Win	31–5	Cuddy DeMarco	PTS	10	Dec 2, 1927	19 years, 274 days	Erie, Pennsylvania, U.S.	
35	Win	30–5	Willie Harmon	PTS	6	Nov 4, 1927	19 years, 246 days	Arena, Syracuse, New York, U.S.	
34	Win	29–5	Billy Leonard	PTS	6	Oct 14, 1927	19 years, 225 days	Arena, Syracuse, New York, U.S.	
33	Win	28–5	Eddie Dyer	PTS	10	Oct 7, 1927	19 years, 218 days	Erie, Pennsylvania, U.S.	
32	Win	27–5	Joe Saviola	PTS	6	Sep 30, 1927	19 years, 211 days	Arena, Syracuse, New York, U.S.	
31	Win	26–5	Willie Greb	PTS	6	Sep 2, 1927	19 years, 183 days	Arena, Syracuse, New York, U.S.	
30	Win	25–5	Sailor Pacilio	PTS	6	Jun 3, 1927	19 years, 92 days	Arena, Syracuse, New York, U.S.	
29	Loss	24–5	Jack Zivic	KO	6 (10)	May 2, 1927	19 years, 60 days	Carney Auditorium, Erie, Pennsylvania, U.S.	
28	Loss	24–4	Eddie Burnbrook	KO	2 (10)	Apr 11, 1927	19 years, 39 days	Erie, Pennsylvania, U.S.	
27	Win	24–3	Sammy Marco	PTS	6	Mar 18, 1927	19 years, 15 days	Arena, Syracuse, New York, U.S.	
26	Win	23–3	Johnny Carey	KO	5 (10)	Mar 11, 1927	19 years, 8 days	Erie, Pennsylvania, U.S.	
25	Win	22–3	Bobby Richardson	PTS	10	Feb 22, 1927	18 years, 356 days	Majestic Theatre, Williamsport, Pennsylvania, U.S.	
24	Win	21–3	Dave Forbes	TKO	7 (10)	Feb 11, 1927	18 years, 345 days	Erie, Pennsylvania, U.S.	
23	Win	20–3	Dorey Shimar	PTS	10	Jan 28, 1927	18 years, 331 days	Erie, Pennsylvania, U.S.	
22	Win	19–3	Dorey Shimar	PTS	6	Jan 21, 1927	18 years, 324 days	Arena, Syracuse, New York, U.S.	
21	Loss	18–3	Eddie Burnbrook	KO	3 (10)	Dec 30, 1926	18 years, 302 days	Arena, Syracuse, New York, U.S.	
20	Win	18–2	Jackie Horner	PTS	6	Dec 15, 1926	18 years, 287 days	Arena, Syracuse, New York, U.S.	
19	Win	17–2	Canastota Bob	PTS	6	Nov 26, 1926	18 years, 268 days	Arena, Syracuse, New York, U.S.	
18	Win	16–2	Kid Savage	PTS	6	Oct 29, 1926	18 years, 240 days	Arena, Syracuse, New York, U.S.	
17	Win	15–2	Pinky Burns	PTS	6	Jul 28, 1926	18 years, 147 days	Johnson Field, Johnson City, New York, U.S.	
16	Loss	14–2	Jackie Brady	PTS	6	Jul 16, 1926	18 years, 105 days	Star Park, Syracuse, New York, U.S.	
15	Loss	14–1	Jackie Brady	PTS	6	May 28, 1926	18 years, 86 days	Arena, Syracuse, New York, U.S.	For Central New York lightweight title
14	Win	14–0	Johnny Sacco	PTS	6	May 21, 1926	18 years, 79 days	Arena, Syracuse, New York, U.S.	
13	Win	13–0	Sailor Pacilio	PTS	6	Apr 12, 1926	18 years, 40 days	Arena, Syracuse, New York, U.S.	
12	Win	12–0	Teddy Dean	PTS	6	Mar 26, 1926	18 years, 23 days	Arena, Syracuse, New York, U.S.	
11	Win	11–0	Bobby Tracey	PTS	6	Mar 12, 1926	18 years, 9 days	Arena, Syracuse, New York, U.S.	
10	Win	10–0	Ralph Miles	TKO	4 (6)	Feb 12, 1926	17 years, 346 days	Arena, Syracuse, New York, U.S.	
9	Win	9–0	Johnny Beach	PTS	6	Jan 22, 1926	17 years, 325 days	Arena, Syracuse, New York, U.S.	
8	Win	8–0	Kid Savage	PTS	6	Jan 18, 1926	17 years, 321 days	Convention Hall, Rochester, New York, U.S.	
7	Win	7–0	Canastota Bob	PTS	6	Dec 4, 1925	17 years, 276 days	Arena, Syracuse, New York, U.S.	
6	Win	6–0	Battling Klem	PTS	?	Nov 26, 1925	17 years, 268 days	Arena, Syracuse, New York, U.S.	
5	Win	5–0	Harry Webber	PTS	4	Nov 11, 1925	17 years, 253 days	Arena, Syracuse, New York, U.S.	
4	Win	4–0	Willie Devanney	PTS	6	Nov 9, 1925	17 years, 251 days	Town Hall, Scranton, Pennsylvania, U.S.	
3	Win	3–0	Willie Devanney	PTS	6	Oct 12, 1925	17 years, 223 days	Town Hall, Scranton, Pennsylvania, U.S.	
2	Win	2–0	Billy Gray	KO	5 (6)	Oct 1, 1925	17 years, 212 days	United States of America	
1	Win	1–0	Tony Occipenti	PTS	6	Sep 28, 1925	17 years, 209 days	Town Hall, Scranton, Pennsylvania, U.S.	Professional debut
