= John McAvoy (footballer) =

Scottish footballer

Personal information
- Date of birth: 1878
- Place of birth: Scotland
- Position: Full-back

Senior career*
Years	Team	Apps	(Gls)
1897–1898	Celtic		
1898	Airdrieonians		
1898–1900	Woolwich Arsenal	25	(0)
1900–1901	Grimsby Town	26	(0)
- * Club domestic league appearances and goals

John McAvoy (born 1878) was a Scottish professional footballer who played as a full-back.
