= John McAvoy (athlete) =

Ironman triathlete and former criminal

John McAvoy is an Iron Man Triathlete and former convicted armed robber.

== Biography ==
John McAvoy was born on September 26 1983. Growing up in a marginalised community, his impoverished family groomed him to lead a life of crime from the time he was a young teenager. He was arrested in 2006 for armed robbery, and sentenced to ten years in prison, two of which were spent at HM Prison Belmarsh. While imprisoned McAvoy began an intense fitness regimen breaking British and World records in the process, and eventually leading him to become a professional athlete.

In 2018 McAvoy was called to give evidence to a UK government committee on the social impact of sport and culture. He is currently the only Nike sponsored Ironman Triathlete.

== Book and other projects ==
McAvoy has also written a book titled Redemption, it was co-written by Mark Turley and published in 2016. He has stated in interviews that he gave copies to the police officers who arrested him and also many prison officers, he did this so he could prove that “people can turn their lives around”. He has also featured on Podcasts with Russell Brand & Dr. Rangan Chatterjee and The High Performance Podcast.
