= Frederick McEvoy (cricketer) =

Australian cricketer

Personal information
- Born: 4 July 1856; Gundagai, Australia
- Died: 5 November 1913 (aged 57); Brighton, Victoria, Australia

Domestic team information
- Years: Team
- 1877: Victoria
- Source: Cricinfo, 7 June 2015

Frederick McEvoy (4 July 1856 – 5 November 1913) was an Australian cricketer. He played one first-class cricket match for Victoria in 1877.

== See also ==
- List of Victoria first-class cricketers
