= Jack McAvoy =

American sports coach and administrator (1930–2008)

Biographical details
- Born: November 6, 1930
- Died: May 22, 2008 (aged 77); Dowagiac, Michigan, U.S.

Playing career

Football
- c. 1953: Hillsdale

Basketball
- c. 1953: Hillsdale

Coaching career (HC unless noted)

Football
- 1957: Bangor HS (MI)
- 1958–1966: Dowagiac Union HS (MI)
- 1967–1973: Hillsdale (assistant)
- 1974–1977: Hillsdale

Basketball
- 1967–1968: Hillsdale

Administrative career (AD unless noted)
- 1976–1996: Hillsdale

Head coaching record
- Overall: 24–16–1 (college football); 19–8 (college basketball)

John H. McAvoy (November 6, 1930 – May 22, 2008) was an American football and basketball coach and college athletic administrator. He served as the head football coach at Hillsdale College in Hillsdale, Michigan. He held that position for four seasons, from 1974 to 1977, compiling a record of 24–16–1. McAvoy was also the head basketball coach at Hillsdale for one season, in 1967–68, tallying a mark of 19–8.

While a student at Hillsdale College, McAvoy played on the school's football, basketball, and track and field teams.

McAvoy died at the age of 77, May 22, 2008, at his home in Dowagiac, Michigan.

== Head coaching record ==
=== College football ===
| Year | Team | Overall | Conference | Standing | Bowl/playoffs |
|---|---|---|---|---|---|
Hillsdale Chargers (Great Lakes Intercollegiate Athletic Conference) (1974–1977)
| 1974 | Hillsdale | 6–3–1 | 1–2 | T–3rd | |
| 1975 | Hillsdale | 7–4 | 3–2 | 4th | |
| 1976 | Hillsdale | 5–5 | 2–3 | 5th | |
| 1977 | Hillsdale | 6–4 | 2–3 | T–3rd | |
| Hillsdale: | | 24–16–1 | 8–10 | | |
| Total: | | 24–16–1 | | | |
