= Jock McAvoy =

British boxer

Personal information
- Nickname: The Rochdale Thunderbolt
- Nationality: British
- Born: Joseph Patrick Bamford; 20 November 1908 Burnley, Lancashire, England
- Died: 20 November 1971 (aged 63) Partington, Cheshire, England
- Weight: Middleweight; Light-heavyweight

Boxing career
- Stance: Orthodox

Boxing record
- Total fights: 147
- Wins: 132
- Win by KO: 88
- Losses: 14
- Draws: 1

Joseph Patrick Bamford (20 November 1908 – 20 November 1971), better known by his ring name Jock McAvoy, was a British boxer who fought from 1927 to 1945. He held the British Empire Middleweight Championship from 1933 to 1939, and took the British Empire Light Heavyweight Title in April 1937 by knocking out Eddie Phillips.

== Early life ==
Bamford was born in Burnley, Lancashire, but was billed as being from Rochdale.

== Boxing career ==
Bamford adopted the name Jock McAvoy so that his mother did not realize he was boxing. Initially discovered, trained and managed by Joseph Tolley at Tolley's famous Rochdale Boxing Club, he was known as the Rochdale thunder bolt. During his career he held the British and Commonwealth middleweight and light heavyweight titles. McAvoy's bid to capture the European middleweight crown was derailed when he lost a unanimous decision to future world middleweight champion Marcel Thil of France in Paris on 15 January 1935.

On 10 August 1931 McAvoy officially held the BBBofC Northern Area Middleweight Title when he defeated Joe Lowthner at King's Hall in Manchester, England. Lowthner's corner through in the towel, ending the bout in eight of fifteen rounds.

== Taking the British Empire Middleweight Title, April 1933 ==
On 10 April 1933 McAvoy took the BBBofC British Middleweight Title and British Empire Middleweight Title in a fifteen-round points decision from Len Harvey in Manchester, England.

In 1935 McAvoy travelled to the United States of America, where he outpointed Al McCoy in November. On 21 December 1935, McAvoy was matched against the World Middleweight boxing champion, Ed 'Babe' Risko at Madison Square Garden in a non-title bout. McAvoy, who outweighed his opponent by seven pounds floored Risko with a right to the jaw in the opening seconds. Risko was dropped five more times in the first round before being knocked out in 2:48. McAvoy had performed too well for his own good, and boxing politics being what they were, McAvoy was never allowed a rematch with the title at stake. McAvoy then decided to campaign as a light heavyweight in the United States. In November 1935 he made his debut in America, and won two fights in February 1936 before obtaining an NBA World Light Heavyweight Title shot against reigning world champion John Henry Lewis at Madison Square Garden in New York City. On 13 March 1936 he was outpointed over 15 rounds by Lewis.

=== Attempting the British Heavyweight Title, April 1936 ===
After his unsuccessful bid to capture the world light heavyweight crown from John Henry Lewis in 1936, McAvoy returned to England, and his next fight was for the British and British Empire heavyweight titles held by Welshman, Jack Petersen. Petersen won the fifteen round fight on points in Kensington, London on 23 April 1936. After a fast start, the action slowed and the crowd of 10,000, urged the boxers to mix. McAvoy picked up the pace, rocking Petersen with some flashy lefts, but was later down for a count of eight from a right uppercut. He fought well, if cautiously for the remainder of the bout, easily remaining on his feet throughout, despite Petersen's twelve pound weight advantage. McAvoy weaved continuously and fought from a crouch, methods he had observed fighting in America. Though there were few fouls, Petersen was repeatedly warned for blows to the back of McAvoy's head.

== Taking the BBBofC British Light Heavyweight Title, April 1937 ==
McAvoy took the BBBofC British Light Heavyweight Title from Eddie Phillips in a fourteenth-round knockout on 27 April 1937 at Empire Pool at Wembley. The match was featured as the semi-final bout.

=== Losing the British Empire Light Heavyweight Title, April 1938 ===
McAvoy officially lost the BBBofC Light Heavyweight Title to Len Harvey on 7 April 1938 in a fast fifteen-round decision at Harringay Arena. Harvey was cut over the right eye when both boxers bumped heads in the third round, and so skillfully ducked a blow by McAvoy in the tenth, that he nearly toppled from the ring.

McAvoy lost another BBBofC World Light Heavyweight Title in a fifteen-round decision against Len Harvey on 10 July 1939 before an incredible crowd of 100,000 at White City Stadium in London. The title was sanctioned as both a World Light Heavyweight, and BBBofC Light Heavyweight Title bout. In the second round Harvey was floored for a count of one, but he finished strong to take the decision. According to the Associated Press, Harvey took a terrific beating in the fourteenth, but caught McAvoy in his corner and beat him harshly with a series of right crosses.

His most important remaining bout was against future Light Heavyweight world champion Freddie Mills, who beat him on points, and forced him to retire in the re-match with an injured back.

== Assessment ==
McAvoy was a hard puncher who scored 88 KOs in his 132 wins. He lost 14 times and was held to a draw once. McAvoy was included in The Ring magazine's list of 100 greatest punchers of all time.

The boxing statistics site BoxRec rates McAvoy as the tenth best British boxer of all time, the second best British boxer of all time in the middleweight division, behind Randolph Turpin and the thirty-ninth best middleweight in the history of boxing.

== Retirement and death ==
In 1951, he was stricken with polio and used a wheelchair for the rest of his life. He had survived both diphtheria and a broken neck prior to his bout with polio.

Suffering from insomnia and depression, McAvoy committed suicide by overdosing on barbiturates at his home in Partington, Cheshire, England, on 20 November 1971.

== See also ==
- List of British light-heavyweight boxing champions
- List of British middleweight boxing champions
