= Georgie Abrams =

American boxer (1918–1994)

Personal information
- Nationality: American
- Born: Georgie Freedom Abrams; November 11, 1918 Roanoke, Virginia, U.S.
- Died: June 30, 1994 (aged 75) Las Vegas, Nevada, U.S.
- Height: 5 ft 9 in (1.75 m)
- Weight: Welterweight; Middleweight

Boxing career
- Stance: Orthodox

Boxing record
- Total fights: 61
- Wins: 48
- Win by KO: 9
- Losses: 10
- Draws: 3

Georgie Abrams (November 11, 1918 – June 30, 1994) was an American boxer who came very close to winning the World Middleweight Championship in November 1941 against Tony Zale and was a top contender for the title in the early 1940s. In his unique boxing career, he fought eight former or future world champions. He was managed by Bo Bregman, and Chris Dundee. Abrams was inducted into the World Boxing Hall of Fame in 2005.

== Early life and career ==
Georgie Abrams was born the son of a shoemaker in Roanoke, Virginia on November 11, 1918. He was given the middle name "Freedom" for being born on Armistice Day. His family eventually moved to Washington, D.C., where he was raised and began his ring career. A gifted athlete and top student in high school, he had to forgo completing college due to the economic pressures of the Great Depression, even though he was offered partial athletic scholarships by two colleges, Notre Dame and Catholic University, in swimming and boxing. He briefly attended Tri-State College in Angola, Indiana, having to leave for financial reasons.

An outstanding amateur boxer, with a record of 62–3, he won the Washington, D.C. AAU Welterweight Title. Later, he took a Golden Gloves championship in Chicago in 1937 at 147 pounds.

Turning professional in 1937, Abrams won his first 17 fights. He earned a shot at middleweight champion Tony Zale by defeating such contenders as Billy Soose, Teddy Yarosz, and Lou Brouillard.

== Early career wins ==
On June 6, 1936, Abrams defeated Teddy Yarosz in a ten-round split decision at the Griffith Stadium in Washington, D.C. In a July 5, 1938, rating of American middleweights, Yarosz was placed at tenth by the Cincinnati Enquirer. Yarosz had previously taken the NYSAC World Middleweight Championship in September 1934 against Vince Dundee in Pittsburgh.

On April 11, 1938, he defeated Jimmy Jones in an eight-round points decision at Turner's Arena in Washington, D.C. Abrams had previously lost to Jones on March 21 in a fifth-round knockout that ended when Jones landed a wild right to his jaw.

On June 29, 1938, he defeated Phil Furr at Griffith Stadium in Washington, D.C., in a ten-round unanimous decision. Furr was rated the number six welterweight in the country in a standing released by the National Boxing Association (NBA) the following month. The fighting was fast, and Furr had Abrams down on the mat at one point in the match.

On April 28, 1939, Abrams defeated Harry Balsamo in the main event at New York's Hippodrome in an eight-round points decision. Abrams, who may have taken every round, was on the offensive throughout, never giving Balsamo a chance to lead with his strong right. Balsamo may have not yet been in top condition having had an appendectomy several months prior to the fight, though Abrams' win was decisive. Abrams was given seven of the eight rounds by most of the judges, and numerous facial cuts at the end, though Balsamo led 3 to 1 in the pre-fight betting.

== Win over former middle champ Lou Brouillard, 1939 ==
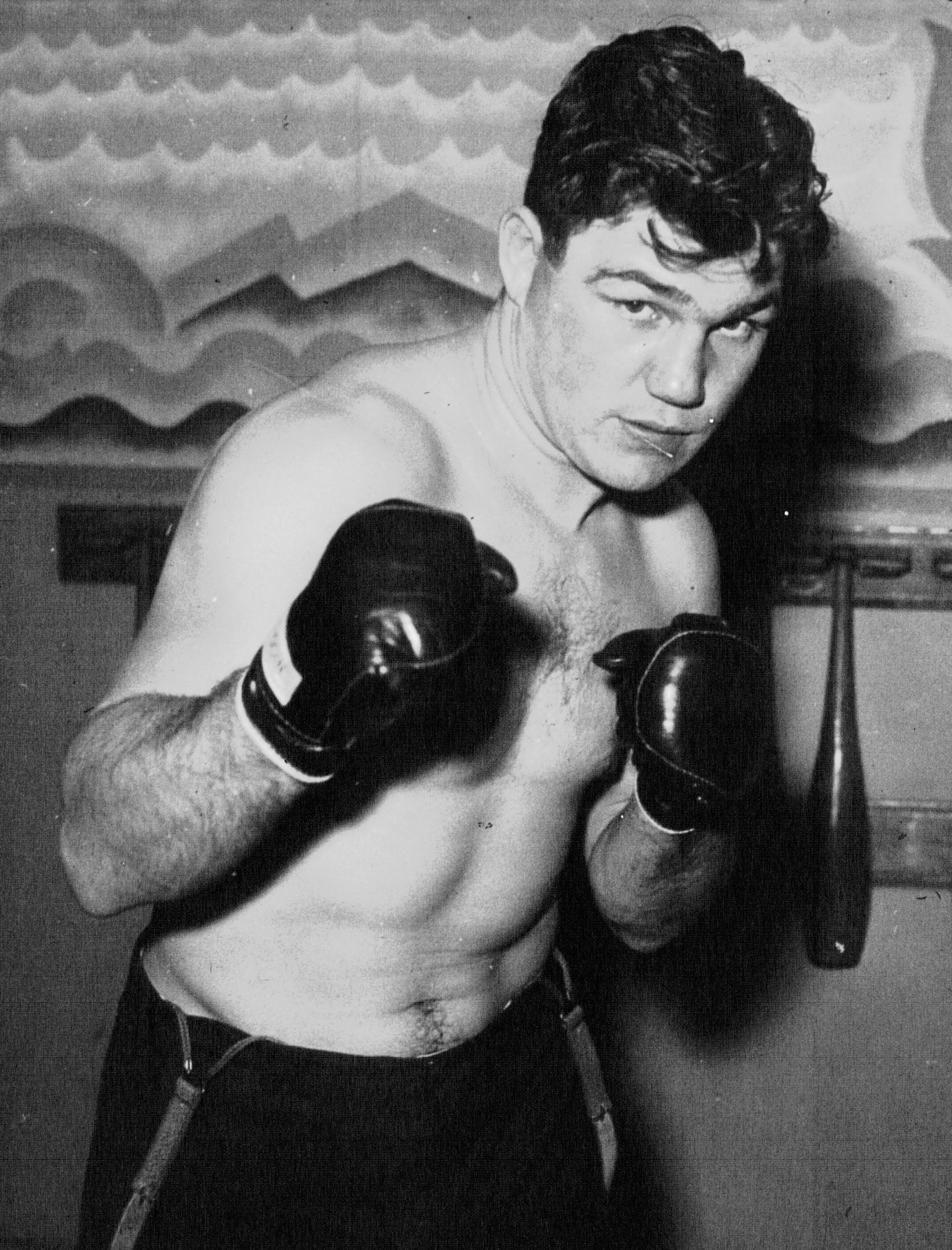
Lou Brouillard

On June 20, 1939, Abrams defeated Lou Brouillard in a ten-round points decision at Griffith Stadium at Abram's home turf in Washington, D.C., in a ten-round points decision. Brouillard was a former October 1931, NBA World Welterweight Champion, and an August 1933 NYSAC World Middleweight Champion against Ben Jeby, making Abram's win more significant.

On October 28, 1939, he defeated Vincent Pimpinella in an eight-round points decision at Ridgewood Grove in Brooklyn, New York. The Italian Flatbush native Pimpinella, also a New York Golden Gloves winner, fought such boxing greats as Lew Tendler, British born champion Jack "Kid" Berg, Billy Soose, and Fritzie Zivic, as well as sharing some of the opponents Abrams had fought including Phil Furr.

He defeated Ernie Vigh on March 26, 1940, in an eight-round points decision at the New York Coliseum in the Bronx. Both boxers fighting near 162, had a rough March bout before 8,000 spectators. Vigh was the victim of an accidental head butt in the second, and Abrams landed a hard left hook to the face of Vigh in the third. Vigh was known as a very hard puncher and was a top New York-based world rated Middleweight contender between 1941 and 1942, rising as high as second in some standings. Like Abrams, he fought champions Tony Zale and Billy Soose in his career.

On July 29, 1940, he met the talented Black boxer Charley Burley in a rough ten round draw at Hickey Park in Millvale, Pennsylvania, close to Burley's hometown of Pittsburgh. Burley had the first two rounds taken from him because of low punches, but may have had a slight edge in the following rounds which ended when Abram's, rallying late with a flurry of punches, may have taken the eighth and ninth. Abrams appeared to have taken the third, but the bout was certainly close and the sharper blows may have been dealt by Burley. The Pittsburgh Press and Post Gazette, though both were hometown papers of Burley, both wrote that Burley probably should have received the decision.

== Cocoa Kid win, August 1940 ==
On August 12, 1940, Abrams defeated the Cocoa Kid (Herbert Hardwick), a Black boxer from New Haven, Connecticut. The "Kid" was rated fifth nationally among Middleweights at the time. The Cocoa Kid took the "Colored" Welterweight Title on June 11, 1937, and had previously held the USA New England Welterweight Title. Impressively, Abrams win over the Kid was the black brawler's first loss in forty six successive bouts.

On September 9, 1940, lost to Polish boxer Henry Chmielewski at 160 pounds at the auditorium in Milwaukee, Wisconsin in a ten-round points decision. According to The Ring magazine, the decision was somewhat controversial as Abrams had fought in a more polished manner, and possibly thrown more punches. On November 28, 1940, he defeated Chmielewski at 161 at the Riverside Stadium in Washington D. C., in a six-round technical knockout.

== Wins over Izzy Jannazzo, Jimmy Leto, and Coley Welsh ==
On December 12, 1940, Abrams defeated Izzy Jannazzo in a ten-round split decision at Carlin's Park in Baltimore. Jannazzo had previously held the World Welterweight Championship as recognized in Maryland in October against the Cocoa Kid. Though leading in the first two rounds, Jannazzo lost the third, being called for a low blow. In the late rounds, a strong attack by Abrams gave him the decision. Abrams dominated the infighting, but Jannazzo put on a more scientific and cautious defense.

On January 20, 1941, Abrams defeated Jimmy Leto in a unanimous decision at Carlin's Park in Baltimore, Maryland. Leto lost the first and seventh due to low blows, though they may have been the only rounds in which he had an edge. Abrams scored with rights and lefts throughout the bout, probably having an edge in all but the first and seventh rounds.

Boxing at 160, On March 7, 1941, he defeated Coley Welsh, a Polish middleweight, at Madison Square Garden in an eight-round points decision. The bout was at the important venue of the Garden and Welsh would take the USA New England Middleweight Title on March 21, 1941, and hold it for several years, but he would never contend for a World Middleweight title.

== Important win over Middle champ Billy Soose, 1941 ==
On July 30, 1941, Abrams defeated Billy Soose at Madison Square Garden in a ten-round unanimous decision. Abrams took a formal furlough from his Naval Reserve Station to attend the bout, already serving as a Boatswain's Mate prior to America's official entry into the WWII. Soose held the World Middleweight Championship recognized in New York and California, having previously taken it in May against Ken Overlin. Before he took the title, Soose had already lost to Abrams twice. One organization, "The American Federation of Boxing", recognized Abrams as World Middleweight Champion after his July 1941 win over Soose, but the organization lacked authority to sanction the title. According to the Decatur Daily Review, Abram's win was fairly decisive, though unfortunately for Abrams, Soose's World Middleweight Title was not on the line, probably since Soose was over the Middleweight limit at 164 pounds.

== Close bout for World middle title, Tony Zale, 1941 ==
He met Gary, Indiana native Tony Zale in Madison Square Garden in a World Middleweight Championship match on November 28, 1941, before a crowd of nearly 10,000. Abrams was already serving in the Navy at an air station in Jacksonville, Florida as a boxing Boatswain's Mate under the invitation of Lt. Commander Gene Tunney, and required a pass to meet Zale in New York. Despite knocking down Zale in the first round, a poke in the eye from Zale's glove in the second left him with pain and blurred vision. From the fourth round on, he fought with his left eye nearly closed. Blood from a cut opened above his right eye in the third from an accidental head butt from Zale caused additional vision problems from blood that dripped from the wound. Despite fighting half blind, Abrams fought courageously for fifteen rounds, taking the sixth round due to a low blow from Zale, and the eighth when he staggered Zale with a hard right to the jaw. The Associated Press actually placed Abrams with the win at eight rounds to Zale's seven. He lost in a somewhat close match, due to the incessant body attacks of Zale in the late rounds, particularly the ninth where he received a severe two handed attack to the midsection.

Rushed to Polyclinic Hospital across the street from his bout with Zale, a doctor felt his eye injury was severe enough to consider surgery to remove it. The Abrams family declined, and Georgie recovered full vision. After recuperating for six months, he returned to boxing and defeated Steve Mamakos in a ten-round points decision on May 25, 1942.

Hoping for a rematch with Zale, WWII intervened, and Abrams served in the Navy where he performed physical training for recruits and boxed in over 200 exhibition bouts.

== Win over Steve Belloise, August 1946 ==
When Abrams was discharged from the Navy in 1946, he fought several tune up fights, though was slowed somewhat in his return to the ring by a kidney operation. On August 23, 1946, he defeated Steve Belloise in a ten-round match before nearly 10,000 fans at Madison Square Garden. Abrams won with fast left jabs and strong right crosses in a fast fight. Abrams won the early rounds with accurate punches, withstood a comeback attempt in the middle rounds. Belloise landed two strong rights to Abram's head in the fifth, opening a cut over Abram's eye which hampered him in the sixth and seventh. But Abrams showed more stamina and took the lead in the ninth and tenth rounds, taking a close decision at the end.

== Bout with Marcel Cerdan, December 1946 ==
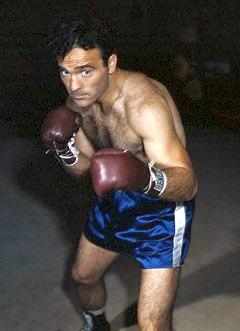
Marcel Cerdan

Abrams next challenged the French middleweight Marcel Cerdan before 17,000 spectators at Madison Square Garden. Marcel would become a World Middleweight Champion in September 1948, after having held the equivalent title in France and Europe. Abrams lost a close ten round decision on December 6, 1946, though it was a unanimous ruling among the judges, who included Ruby Goldstein. The Des Moines Register agreed that the match was close, but that Cerdan put on a fierce display of punching in the closing rounds accounting for his victory. The Associated Press gave five rounds to Cerdan, four to Abrams, and one even. Cerdan had not lost a match on points or by knockout in 97 previous bouts and was considered to be the greatest European boxer of the era.

== Close bout with Sugar Ray Robinson, May 1947 ==
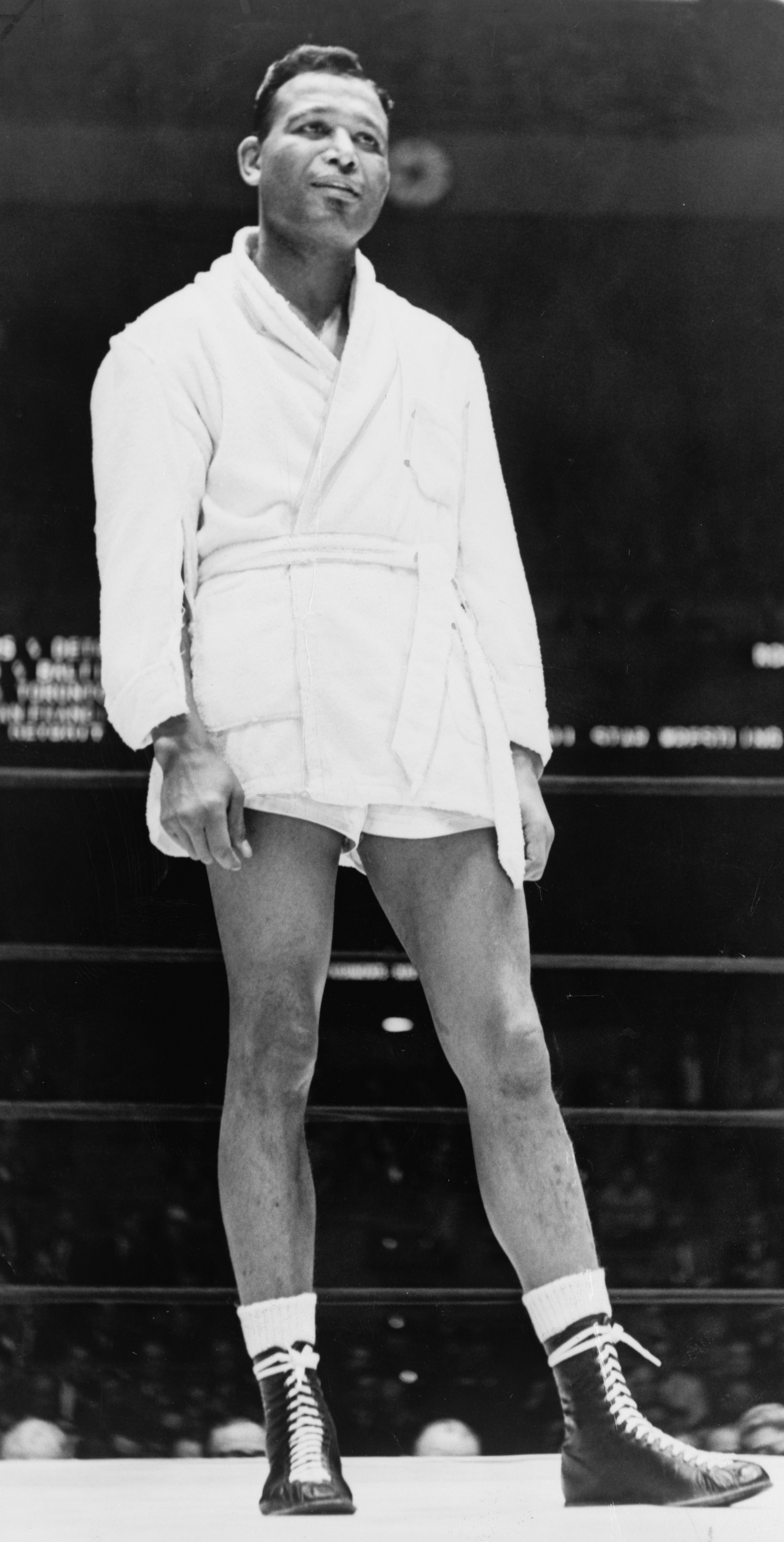
Sugar Ray Robinson

On May 16, 1947, he lost a split ten round decision before a crowd of 15,000, against Sugar Ray Robinson, the reigning welterweight world champion, at New York's Madison Square Garden. The shorter armed but heavier Abrams was able to maneuver inside of Robinson's longer reach keeping much of the fighting at close quarters. But Abrams was unable to land a knockout blow against the skilled Robinson. Robinson received fouls for low blows in both the seventh and eighth rounds. According to the Brooklyn Daily Eagle, Robinson had tired somewhat by the late rounds, and may have been past his prime. Abrams staggered his opponent with hard rights in both the sixth and ninth. Robinson fought the match with a ten-pound weight disadvantage at around 150. The crowd voiced their disapproval of the final ruling, and the Associated Press gave Abrams a slight edge in the bout in contrast with the decision of the referees. Robinson once remarked that Abrams had given him his toughest bout.

== Second bout with Steve Belloise, July 1947 ==
In a second match with Steve Belloise on July 11, 1947, Abrams lost in a fifth-round technical knockout at Madison Square Garden. He was down in the first and second rounds before the bout was stopped in the fifth. Abram's knockdowns were the first any boxer had scored on him in eight years, probably demonstrating that his reign at the top of contenders was ending. Belloise had served with Abrams in the Navy in 1941 as a Boatswain's Mate. The crowd of a little under 8,000 was a poor turnout for the Garden.

== Loss to former middle champ Fred Apostoli, November 1947 ==
On November 17, 1947, Abrams lost to Fred Apostoli, also a former navy veteran, in a close ten round mixed decision at the Civic Auditorium in San Francisco. Apostoli was a former NYSAC (New York State) World Middleweight Champion from November 1938. In front of nearly 9,000 fans, Apostoli faced a more aggressive attack from Abrams than his typical scientific, cautious defense, but Apostoli slowed Abrams with a flurry of blows to the midsection in five rounds. The only knockdown was caused from a right to the jaw by Abrams, but it was brief occurring at the end of the fifth. The crowd seemed to be rooting for Abrams, though Apostoli was fighting in his hometown, and the decision for Apostoli was met with boos, and there was loud applause when Abrams left the fight. Apostoli was cautioned on several occasions for low blows in the fifth and sixth rounds, and lost points as a result. Both boxers weighed in at 162.

== Loss to Anton Raadik, retirement, April 1948 ==
Abrams lost to Anton Raadik in a tenth round technical knockout on April 21, 1948, at the International Amphitheatre in Chicago, Illinois. He was down in the ninth, and twice in the tenth, and according to the United Press, he was battered around the ring so badly that his manager, Chris Dundee, announced he was through. Following the advice of his manager, Abrams never boxed in professional competition again. Abrams had defeated Raadik the previous year in a tough battle on April 11, in a ten-round unanimous decision before a crowd of 13,000 at Chicago Stadium. The crushing defeat one year later was a disappointment to many.

== Life after boxing ==
After retiring from boxing in 1948, Abrams attempted unsuccessfully to make a living as an illustrator in Brooklyn, New York, drawing portraits. He had one exhibition of his paintings in New York in July 1947 while he was still boxing which was not a great success. He worked at various times as an auto dealer, liquor salesman, and owner of a tavern. After living for a while in Florida in the late 1950s where he parked cars in Miami Beach, he eventually settled down in Las Vegas where he worked as a security guard at the Tropicana. He suffered a serious heart attack in the early 1980s. He married his third wife, Vicki Lee, a former singer in Tommy Dorsey's band, in 1984 and was previously married to Terrie Tumin when he lived in New York. Tumin, whose father was a merchant in Flatbush, married Abrams shortly after his return from the Navy in 1946. By the 1980s Abrams was suffering from a progressive dementia common to boxers which affected him the rest of his life.

He died on June 30, 1994, in Las Vegas after suffering a stroke.

He was posthumously inducted into the World Boxing Hall of Fame in 2005.

== Professional boxing record ==
61 fights	48 wins	10 losses
By knockout	9	3
By decision	39	7
Draws	3	

No.	Result	Record	Opponent	Type	Round, time	Date	Location	Notes
61	Loss	48–10–3	Anton Raadik	TKO	10 (10)	Apr 21, 1948	International Amphitheatre, Chicago, Illinois, US	
60	Loss	48–9–3	Fred Apostoli	MD	10	Nov 17, 1947	Civic Auditorium, San Francisco, California, US	
59	Loss	48–8–3	Steve Belloise	TKO	5 (10)	Jul 11, 1947	Madison Square Garden, New York City, New York, US	
58	Loss	48–7–3	Sugar Ray Robinson	SD	10	May 16, 1947	Madison Square Garden, New York City, New York, US	
57	Win	48–6–3	Anton Raadik	UD	10	Apr 11, 1947	Chicago Stadium, Chicago, Illinois, US	
56	Loss	47–6–3	Marcel Cerdan	UD	10	Dec 6, 1946	Madison Square Garden, New York City, New York, US	
55	Win	47–5–3	Steve Belloise	MD	10	Aug 23, 1946	Madison Square Garden, New York City, New York, US	
54	Draw	46–5–3	Jimmy Mandell	PTS	10	Jun 24, 1946	Griffith Stadium, Washington, DC, US	
53	Win	46–5–2	Johnny Lawer	PTS	10	Jun 13, 1946	Mooers Field, Richmond, Virginia, US	
52	Win	45–5–2	Johnny Lawer	PTS	10	May 20, 1946	Forbes Field, Pittsburgh, Pennsylvania, US	
51	Win	44–5–2	Steve Mamakos	PTS	10	May 25, 1942	Griffith Stadium, Washington, DC, US	
50	Loss	43–5–2	Tony Zale	UD	15	Nov 28, 1941	Madison Square Garden, New York City, New York, US	For NBA, vacant NYSAC, and The Ring middleweight titles
49	Win	43–4–2	Gene Molnar	PTS	10	Oct 13, 1941	Beach Arena, Miami Beach, Florida, US	
48	Win	42–4–2	Billy Soose	UD	10	Jul 30, 1941	Madison Square Garden, New York City, New York, US	
47	Win	41–4–2	Joey Spangler	PTS	10	Jun 19, 1941	City Stadium, Richmond, Virginia, US	
46	Win	40–4–2	Coley Welch	PTS	8	Mar 7, 1941	Madison Square Garden, New York City, New York, US	
45	Win	39–4–2	Jimmy O'Boyne	KO	3 (8)	Feb 11, 1941	Broadway Arena, New York City, New York, US	
44	Win	38–4–2	Jimmy Leto	PTS	10	Jan 20, 1941	Carlin's Park, Baltimore, Maryland, US	
43	Win	37–4–2	Izzy Jannazzo	SD	10	Dec 12, 1940	Coliseum, Baltimore, Maryland, US	
42	Win	36–4–2	Henry Chmielewski	TKO	6 (10)	Nov 28, 1940	Riverside Stadium, Washington, DC, US	
41	Win	35–4–2	Augie Arellano	UD	8	Nov 19, 1940	New York Coliseum, New York City, New York, US	
40	Win	34–4–2	Jack Munley	UD	10	Oct 21, 1940	Town Hall, Scranton, Pennsylvania, US	
39	Loss	33–4–2	Henry Chmielewski	PTS	10	Sep 9, 1940	Auditorium, Milwaukee, Wisconsin, US	
38	Win	33–3–2	Herbert Lewis Hardwick	SD	10	Aug 12, 1940	Griffith Stadium, Washington, DC, US	
37	Draw	32–3–2	Charley Burley	PTS	10	Jul 29, 1940	Hickey Park, Millvale, Pennsylvania, US	
36	Win	32–3–1	Augie Arellano	PTS	8	May 21, 1940	Queensboro Arena, New York City, New York, US	
35	Win	31–3–1	Joe Sutka	PTS	6	Apr 5, 1940	Olympia Stadium, Detroit, Michigan, US	
34	Win	30–3–1	Ernie Vigh	PTS	8	Mar 26, 1940	New York Coliseum, New York City, New York, US	
33	Win	29–3–1	Billy Soose	UD	10	Feb 12, 1940	Duquesne Gardens, Pittsburgh, Pennsylvania, US	
32	Win	28–3–1	Joe Duca	TKO	8 (8), 1:23	Dec 18, 1939	Turner's Arena, Washington, DC, US	
31	Draw	27–3–1	Fred Henneberry	PTS	8	Nov 17, 1939	Madison Square Garden, New York City, New York, US	
30	Win	27–3	Vince Pimpinella	PTS	8	Oct 28, 1939	Ridgewood Grove, New York City, New York, US	
29	Win	26–3	Billy Soose	UD	8	Sep 25, 1939	Forbes Field, Pittsburgh, Pennsylvania, US	
28	Win	25–3	Vic Dellicurti	PTS	8	Jul 25, 1939	Queensboro Arena, New York City, New York, US	
27	Loss	24–3	Vic Dellicurti	PTS	8	Jun 27, 1939	Queensboro Arena, New York City, New York, US	
26	Win	24–2	Lou Brouillard	PTS	10	Jun 20, 1939	Griffith Stadium, Washington, DC, US	
25	Win	23–2	Harry Balsamo	PTS	8	Apr 28, 1939	Hippodrome, New York City, New York, US	
24	Win	22–2	Babe Orgovan	PTS	8	Apr 6, 1939	Hippodrome, New York City, New York, US	
23	Loss	21–2	Steve Mamakos	UD	10	Aug 15, 1938	Griffith Stadium, Washington, DC, US	
22	Win	21–1	Phil Furr	UD	10	Jun 29, 1938	Griffith Stadium, Washington, DC, US	
21	Win	20–1	Teddy Yarosz	SD	10	Jun 6, 1938	Griffith Stadium, Washington, DC, US	
20	Win	19–1	Jimmy O'Boyne	PTS	8	May 2, 1938	Turner's Arena, Washington, DC, US	
19	Win	18–1	Jimmy Jones	PTS	8	Apr 11, 1938	Turner's Arena, Washington, DC, US	
18	Loss	17–1	Jimmy Jones	KO	5 (8), 1:40	Mar 21, 1938	Turner's Arena, Washington, DC, US	
17	Win	17–0	Tony Cisco	SD	8	Feb 28, 1938	Turner's Arena, Washington, DC, US	
16	Win	16–0	Ben Wojack	UD	8	Feb 7, 1938	Turner's Arena, Washington, DC, US	
15	Win	15–0	Leo Finnegan	PTS	8	Jan 10, 1938	Turner's Arena, Washington, DC, US	
14	Win	14–0	Steve Mamakos	UD	8	Dec 27, 1937	Turner's Arena, Washington, DC, US	
13	Win	13–0	Johnny Barrie	KO	4 (6)	Nov 29, 1937	Turner's Arena, Washington, DC, US	
12	Win	12–0	Sargis Prevost	UD	6	Nov 15, 1937	Turner's Arena, Washington, DC, US	
11	Win	11–0	Charley Marshall	UD	6	Nov 8, 1937	Turner's Arena, Washington, DC, US	
10	Win	10–0	Joey Spangler	PTS	6	Oct 18, 1937	Griffith Stadium, Washington, DC, US	
9	Win	9–0	Charley Ubele	PTS	4	Oct 11, 1937	Arena, Philadelphia, Pennsylvania, US	
8	Win	8–0	Eddie Miles	TKO	2 (4)	Sep 13, 1937	Arena Stadium, Philadelphia, Pennsylvania, US	
7	Win	7–0	Hunter Crostic	PTS	4	Sep 1, 1937	Griffith Stadium, Washington, DC, US	
6	Win	6–0	Charley Rondo	KO	3 (4)	Aug 2, 1937	Griffith Stadium, Washington, DC, US	
5	Win	5–0	Joe Chaney	UD	4	Jul 6, 1937	Griffith Stadium, Washington, DC, US	
4	Win	4–0	Tony Livingston	KO	2 (4)	Jun 28, 1937	Griffith Stadium, Washington, DC, US	
3	Win	3–0	Bobby Wilson	PTS	4	Jun 23, 1937	Griffith Stadium, Washington, DC, US	
2	Win	2–0	Sam Baccala	KO	3 (4)	Jun 2, 1937	Griffith Stadium, Washington, DC, US	
1	Win	1–0	Eddie Stillson	KO	2 (4)	May 10, 1937	Turner's Arena, Washington, DC, US	
