= Izzy Jannazzo =

American boxer (1915-1995)

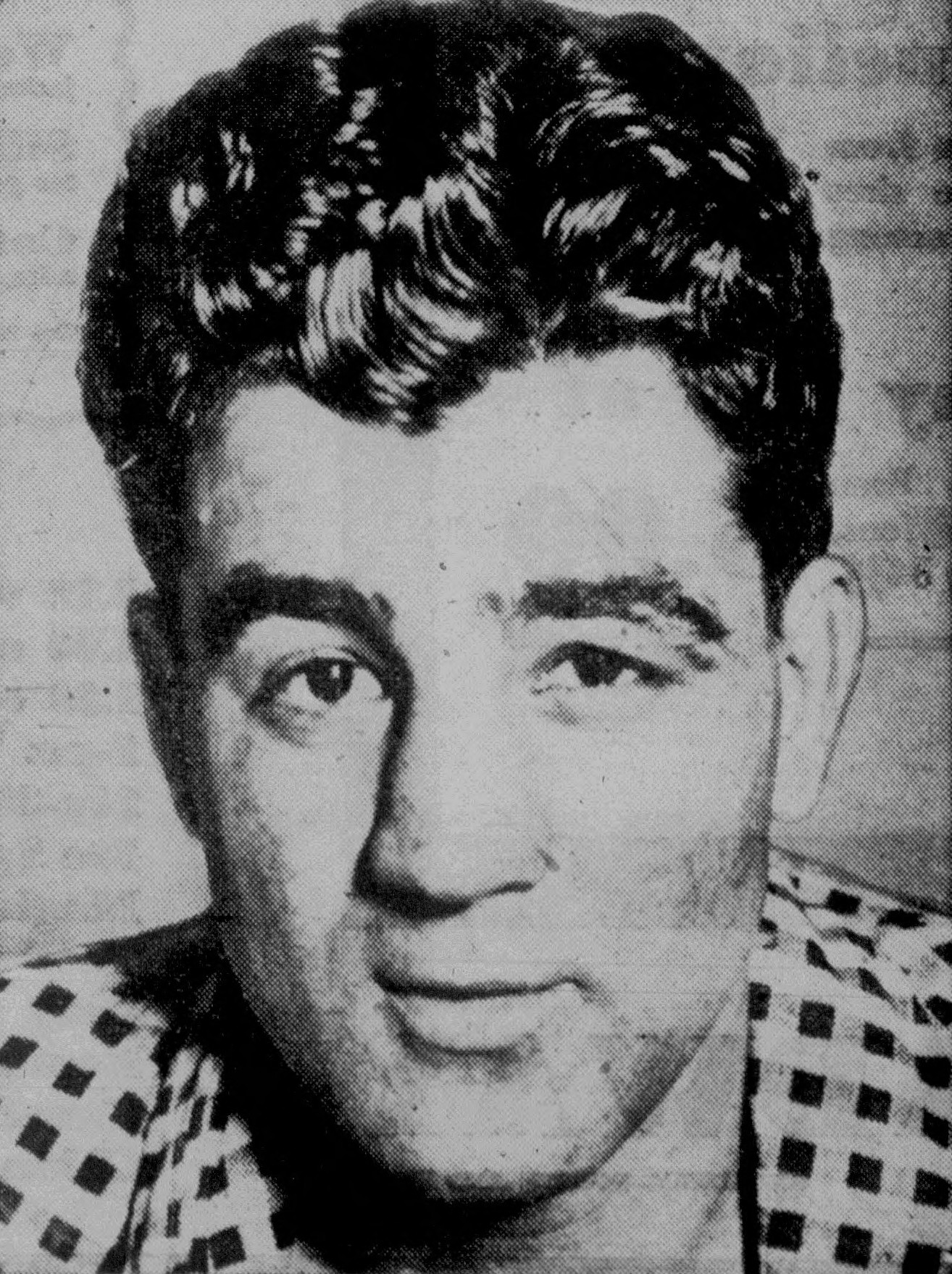

Personal information
- Nationality: American
- Born: Isadoro Anthony Jannazzo; January 31, 1915 Ensley, Alabama, U.S.
- Died: June 18, 1995 (aged 80) Columbus, Ohio, U.S.
- Height: 5 ft 9 in (175 cm)
- Weight: Welterweight; Middleweight

Boxing career
- Reach: 71 1/2 in (182 cm)
- Stance: Orthodox

Boxing record
- Total fights: 126
- Wins: 65
- Win by KO: 8
- Losses: 46
- Draws: 15

Isadoro Anthony "Izzy" Jannazzo (January 31, 1915 – June 18, 1995) was an American professional boxer who challenged Barney Ross for the NYSAC, NBA, and The Ring magazine world welterweight championship in November 1936, and took the Maryland version of the World Welterweight Championship in October 1940. In 1937, he fought national welterweight champions before large crowds in Australia and Germany. In 1940, he was listed as the world's top welterweight contender by some sources. His managers were Guy Anselmi and Chris Dundee.

== Early life and career ==
Isadoro Jannazzo was born on January 31, 1915, in Ensley, Alabama to poor Sicilian Italian parents Francesca and Anthony Jannazzo. He would become part of a family of six, which included a sister Bernice and brothers Vincent and Sam and would live in his hometown until roughly the age of seventeen. He may have boxed in as many as one hundred amateur bouts, and once contended for a state bantamweight championship around the age of fourteen. After his family's move to New York around 1932, his mother died, causing him to shoulder additional financial responsibility for the support of his family. In 1941, Izzy married Francesca "Frances" Tombrello, who was five years his junior. Francesca's family, who had also lived in Ensley, Alabama, where she was born, had been friends of his family for many years. Francesca and her family moved to New York shortly after his. Izzy and his wife would settle on Troutman Street in Brooklyn, New York, in attached buildings near other family members.

Fighting in the New York City area, primarily Brooklyn or the Bronx between December 6, 1932, and January 13, 1934, he won nine of nineteen fights, losing six and drawing three times. He was not considered a power hitter yet won 65 of 126 bouts, though scoring only 8 knockouts.

=== Important early career wins ===
On April 21, 1934, he defeated Murray Brandt in a six-round points decision at Ridgewood Grove Arena in Brooklyn. He had formerly lost to Brandt in a six-round decision.

On May 31, 1934, he defeated Stanislaus Loayza in a six-round points decision at Fort Hamilton Arena in Brooklyn, New York. Stanislaus would contend for the NYSE World Lightweight Title in July 1935 against Jimmy Goodrich and was well known in his native Chile.

On November 17, 1934, he defeated Joe Rossi at the Ridgewood Grove in Brooklyn, New York in a six-round points decision. Rossi was another well rated New York welterweight who had previously beaten Jannazzo in six rounds on September 30, 1933, in Brooklyn. He would draw with Rossi in a six-round Brooklyn bout shortly after.

On January 7, 1935, he defeated Tony Falco at the St. Nicholas Arena in New York in a ten-round points decision. Jannazzo, with a reach advantage landed effective rights in the first, had an even second, and fought fiercely and evenly in the third and fourth. Jannazzo took the fifth with clean rights to the body and face while eluding Falco. Falco took the sixth using both hands, but Jannazzo may have taken the eighth with two stiff rights to the head of Falco near the end of the round. Jannazzo may have taken the ninth with lefts to the face of Falco, though the tenth was even with both boxers too exhausted to land stiff blows.

At 145 pounds, Jannazzo fought Jackie Davis twice on January 26, and February 16, in eight round points decisions at Ridgewood Grove in Brooklyn, losing the first, but winning the second. Jannazzo had roughly a four-pound weight advantage in each bout.

=== Defeating Kid Azteca and Steve Halaiko ===
On March 2, 1935, he lost to Kid Azteca at the Arena Nacional in Mexico City in a ten-round points decision. In 1936, Azteca, Mexico City born, would take and hold the Mexican Welterweight title and fight in five separate decades in his native land.

On May 4, 1936, Jannazzo, at 145 1/2, scored a small upset defeating top NYSE welterweight contender Billy Celebron at the St. Nicholas Arena in New York in a ten-round points decision. According to the United Press, Celebron won only three rounds with the fourth and seventh even.

On July 6, 1936, fighting at 145 1/2, he knocked out Steve Halaiko in the fourth of six rounds at the Dexter Park arena in Queens.

== Win over former Light Welterweight Champion Johnny Jadick, draw with Ceferino Garcia ==
At 145 1/4 pounds, on July 22, 1936, he defeated former champion Johnny Jadick, in a ten-round points decision at the Dykman Oval in Manhattan. In a decisive win, Jannazzo put Jadick on the canvas in the first, fourth and sixth rounds. The fight was a benefit for the United Palestine Appeal. Jadick had previously taken the World Light Welterweight Championship on March 18, 1932, against Tony Canzoneri.

On October 30, 1936, he fought an important fifteen-round draw with Ceferino Garcia before a crowd of 5640 at New York's Madison Square Garden. In a fairly close bout, the Associated Press gave eight rounds to Garcia, six to Jannazzo, and one even. Jannazzo, a powerful hitter who had once floored Barney Ross, was thrown off in his attack by the scientific defense of Jannazzo, who was able to throw Garcia off balance from his attacks with his jabbing. Garcia scored the fight's only knockdown in the eighth for a count of one with a strong right. In the seventh through the fifteenth, both boxers changed the pace from the more cautious early rounds, and unleashed continuous punches. Garcia lost two of the first three rounds from penalties for low punches, and narrowly lost the other, but won most all of the remaining rounds through the ninth with a more aggressive display. The tenth through the twelfth went to Jannazzo who effectively used jabs to Garcia's head, interfering with his punching. Garcia would take the World Middleweight Championship in 1939.

== Undisputed Welterweight Title bout against Barney Ross, November 1936 ==
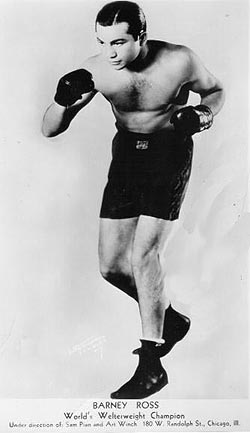
Barney Ross

On November 27, 1936, he faced the incomparable triple division champion Barney Ross before 8,484 spectators in a NYSAC, NBA, and Ring Magazine recognized World Welterweight Championship at Madison Square Garden, losing in a fifteen-round unanimous decision. There were few serious knockdowns in the bout, a credit to Jannazzo, though Ross may have taken as many as nine rounds, clearly starting out with an edge in the first two. Jannazzo was knocked down only briefly in the second and the fifth, for counts of one, and two, both from rights from Ross, though he likely slipped backing away in the fifth. The Associated Press had Ross with ten of the fifteen rounds, with four to Janazzo and one even. Janazzo showed pluck lasting fifteen rounds with Ross, even scoring with hard right crosses in the seventh, eighth, and tenth, though the outcome of the bout was never strongly in doubt.

On June 18, 1937, he defeated Phoenix welterweight Freddie Dixon in a ten-round points decision at the Municipal Stadium in Phoenix, Arizona.

== Boxing in Sydney, Australia, and Hamburg, Germany, December 1937–38 ==
On December 21, 1937, and January 25, 1938, he fought Jack Carroll and Dick Humphries in Sydney, Australia, losing both bouts in ten round points decisions. The bout with Carroll, Australian Welterweight Champion, brought an enthused capacity crowd of 30,000, likely the largest crowd of Jannazzo's career. Jannazzo was badly pummeled by Carroll's blows to both body and head, but never tired in the bout, and attempted to return counterpunches after each encounter. The bout was described as one of Carroll's best. "Jack Carroll Wins from Izzy Jannazzo", The Winnipeg Tribune gave Carroll nine of the ten rounds.

On October 15, 1938, he fought a fifteen-round draw with Gustav Eder, German Welterweight Champion, at Hanseaten Hall in Hamburg, Germany. The bout was close, with Jannazzo scoring with fast lefts through the first seven rounds, but Eder scoring with rights to the head and body in the subsequent rounds. The decision was unpopular with the enthusiastic home crowd of 10,000, among whom may felt Jannazzo had shown more science in the boxing and landed the more telling blows. In a previous match in New York in September 1936 with Eder, Jannazzo had won a fifteen-round points decision.

On February 7, 1940, he defeated Jackie Burke in a ten-round points decision at the Watres Armory in Scranton, Pennsylvania. Jannazzo battered Burke with both hands throughout the bout.

On April 10, 1940, he defeated Steve Mamakos at Riverside Stadium in Washington, D. C., in a ten-round split decision.

On September 4, 1940, he defeated Holman Williams in a ten-round points decision at Griffith Stadium in Washington, D.C. In that year, Holman was rated seventh in the world among welterweights. He would become a boxer of some renown, taking the World Colored Middleweight Championship on October 16, 1942, against Charley Burley in New Orleans, Louisiana. Holman would lose the title to the "Cocoa Kid". Williams had previously beaten Jannazzo on March 27, 1940, in Scranton, Pennsylvania in a ten-round points decision. Williams, fighting at 150 in their March meeting, won from clever infighting in the later rounds, when Jannazzo may have tired from his strong opening rounds.

== Taking the Welterweight Championship of the World (Maryland version), October 1940 ==
He won the Welterweight Championship of the World (as recognized by Maryland state), fighting at 147 pounds against the Puerto Rican boxer "Cocoa Kid" on October 14, 1940, in a close fifteen round split decision before 3,000 fans at Carlin's Park in Baltimore, Maryland. Jannazzo took the bout using a strong left jab, and effective footwork that left him out of the range of his Puerto Rican challenger. The "Kid", who fought with a four-pound disadvantage, repeatedly tried to take the fight to Jannazzo but was stopped by Jannazzo's ever present left jab. Jack Dempsey refereed the bout.

== Loss to future middleweight champion Georgie Abrams, December 1940 ==
On December 12, 1940, Jannazzo lost to Georgie Abrams in a ten-round split decision at Carlin's Park in Baltimore. Though leading in the first two rounds, Jannazzo lost the third, being called for a low blow. In the late rounds, a strong attack by Abrams gave him the decision. Abrams dominated the infighting, but Jannazzo put on a more scientific and cautious defense.

Fighting at 145 1/2, on April 14, 1941, he defended the Maryland version of the World Welterweight Championship against Jimmy Leto in a fifteen-round split decision at the Coliseum in Baltimore, Maryland. Leto was a rated welterweight, and the victory was a significant one. Jannazzo once again used his strong left to win the bout, though the decision was somewhat disputed as the referee voted against Jannazzo, while both judges voted in his favor.

On September 21, 1942, in a lead-up to his fight with Sugar Ray Robinson, Jannazzo defeated Portuguese born Freddie Cabral in a ten-round points decision at the Valley Arena, in Holyoke, Massachusetts.

== Bouts with Sugar Ray Robinson, October 1942 and March 1946 ==
On October 19, 1942, he lost to the great Sugar Ray Robinson for the first time at the arena in Philadelphia, Pennsylvania, in a ten-round unanimous decision. Immediately after on December 1, 1942, he fought a return bout with Robinson at the Arena in Cleveland, Ohio, losing in an eighth round Technical Knockout.

He defeated "Wild" Bill McDowell of Dallas on June 17, 1943, in a ten-round points decision at Moers Field in Richmond, Virginia. McDowell was unable to use his left hand for seven rounds, after injuring his right in the third. McDowell had a ten-pound advantage over Jannazzo who weighed in at 149 1/2 pounds. It was a noteworthy win considering the disadvantages with which Jannazzo fought.

On May 9, 1944, he defeated Johnny Green at Memorial Auditorium before 3,893 fans in Buffalo, New York in a ten-round unanimous decision. Jannazzo, fighting at 152, won the bout with a well placed left, which he was unable to use to equal advantage in previous bouts with Green. Green had defeated and drawn with Jannazzo the previous February at the same venue in Buffalo. Green was a black boxer from Buffalo who fought several of the same opponents as Jannazzo.

He defeated Charley Parham twice in July and September 1945 at the Auditorium in Milwaukee, Wisconsin. Jannazzo took the September bout by a unanimous decision with Parham winning only one round, but their July bout was somewhat closer. Jannuzzo had "little trouble", however, in scoring the decision in their second meeting.

On November 16, 1945, he defeated Frankie Abrams before 3000 fans in a ten-round unanimous decision at Olympia Stadium in Detroit. Jannazzo took every round but the last, when Abrams made a late rally. Abrams scored four knockdowns in the second round, showing his dominance.

On March 14, 1946, he fought champion Sugar Ray Robinson for the last time in Baltimore, Maryland, losing in a ten-round unanimous decision before a somewhat disappointing crowd of 4100. All three judges voted for Robinson. Jannazzo at 154, was outboxed by Robinson throughout the fight, and Robinson won every round. He had formerly fought Robinson on October 13, 1944, in Boston Garden before a crowd of 7,347, losing in a second-round technical knockout. Robinson had returned to the ring after fourteen months in the army, but had no trouble dropping Jannazzo twice in the second with well placed lefts and rights to the head, before asking the referee to end the fight.

On June 17, 1946, fighting at 151 3/4, he defeated Ralph Zannelli at the Rhode Island Auditorium in a ten-round points decision.

Fighting at 155 pounds on June 5, 1946, he defeated Joe Governale in a ten-round split decision at McArthur Stadium in Brooklyn, New York. He would lose to Governale at the same location in a ten-round decision one month later.

On January 28, 1947, he fought his last fight against Steve Belloise at the Orange Bowl in Miami, Florida. Belloise scored a technical knockout in 2:20 of the third round, and his manager, Chris Dundee, announced Jannazzo's retirement after seventeen years in the ring.

== Life after boxing ==
During WWII, Jannazzo worked as an air raid warden. After retiring from boxing in 1947, Jannazzo eventually worked for the city managing an incinerator for the department of sanitation. He retired at sixty-five to spend time with his children and grandchildren.

Around 1991, shortly after he moved to Columbus, Ohio, his family placed him in a nursing home, due primarily to the progressive boxing induced dementia from which he was suffering.

On June 18, 1995, Jannazzo died in Columbus, Ohio. He was buried in Forest Lawn Memorial Gardens in Columbus, where his wife had been buried three months earlier.

== Professional boxing record ==
126 fights	65 wins	46 losses
By knockout	8	6
By decision	57	40
Draws	15	

No.	Result	Record	Opponent	Type	Round	Date	Age	Location	Notes
126	Loss	65–46–15	Steve Belloise	TKO	3 (10)	Jan 28, 1947	31 years, 362 days	Orange Bowl, Miami, Florida, U.S.	
125	Loss	65–45–15	Henry Jordan	UD	10	Oct 28, 1946	31 years, 270 days	Rhode Island Auditorium, Providence, Rhode Island, U.S.	
124	Loss	65–44–15	Joe Governale	UD	10	Jul 2, 1946	31 years, 152 days	MacArthur Stadium, New York City, New York, U.S.	
123	Win	65–43–15	Ralph Zannelli	UD	10	Jun 17, 1946	31 years, 137 days	Rhode Island Auditorium, Providence, Rhode Island, U.S.	
122	Win	64–43–15	Joe Governale	SD	10	Jun 5, 1946	31 years, 125 days	MacArthur Stadium, New York City, New York, U.S.	
121	Loss	63–43–15	Sugar Ray Robinson	UD	10	Mar 14, 1946	31 years, 42 days	5th Regiment Armory, Baltimore, Maryland, U.S.	
120	Loss	63–42–15	Joe Legon	PTS	10	Feb 16, 1946	31 years, 16 days	Palacio de Deportes, Havana, Cuba	
119	Loss	63–41–15	Joe Blackwood	PTS	10	Jan 25, 1946	30 years, 359 days	Boston Garden, Boston, Massachusetts, U.S.	
118	Win	63–40–15	Frankie Abrams	UD	10	Nov 16, 1945	30 years, 284 days	Olympia Stadium, Detroit, Michigan, U.S.	
117	Loss	62–40–15	Jimmy Sherrer	UD	10	Sep 27, 1945	30 years, 239 days	Auditorium, Milwaukee, Wisconsin, U.S.	
116	Win	62–39–15	Charley Parham	UD	10	Sep 6, 1945	30 years, 218 days	Auditorium, Milwaukee, Wisconsin, U.S.	
115	Win	61–39–15	Tony Riccio	PTS	10	Jul 30, 1945	30 years, 180 days	Meadowbrook Bowl, Newark, New Jersey, U.S.	
114	Win	60–39–15	Charley Parham	PTS	10	Jul 19, 1945	30 years, 169 days	Auditorium, Milwaukee, Wisconsin, U.S.	
113	Loss	59–39–15	Dave Clark	PTS	10	Jun 27, 1945	30 years, 147 days	Crosley Field, Cincinnati, Ohio, U.S.	
112	Win	59–38–15	Van McNutt	UD	10	Mar 5, 1945	30 years, 33 days	Metropolitan Opera House, Philadelphia, Pennsylvania, U.S.	
111	Loss	58–38–15	Prentiss Hall	SD	8	Feb 27, 1945	30 years, 27 days	Memorial Auditorium, Buffalo, New York, U.S.	
110	Loss	58–37–15	Ralph Zannelli	SD	10	Dec 22, 1944	29 years, 326 days	Boston Garden, Boston, Massachusetts, U.S.	
109	Loss	58–36–15	Sugar Ray Robinson	TKO	2 (10)	Oct 13, 1944	29 years, 256 days	Boston Garden, Boston, Massachusetts, U.S.	
108	Win	58–35–15	Larney Moore	TKO	5 (10)	Sep 5, 1944	29 years, 218 days	Auditorium Outdoor Arena, Hartford, Connecticut, U.S.	
107	Loss	57–35–15	Bee Bee Wright	MD	10	Jun 12, 1944	29 years, 133 days	Forbes Field, Pittsburgh, U.S.	
106	Win	57–34–15	Johnny Green	UD	10	May 9, 1944	29 years, 99 days	Memorial Auditorium, Buffalo, New York, U.S.	
105	Win	56–34–15	Larry Anzalone	UD	10	Apr 14, 1944	29 years, 74 days	Boston Garden, Boston, Massachusetts, U.S.	
104	Win	55–34–15	Phil Enzenga	UD	10	Apr 6, 1944	29 years, 66 days	Olympia Stadium, Detroit, Michigan, U.S.	
103	Win	54–34–15	Phil Enzenga	TKO	7 (10)	Mar 10, 1944	29 years, 39 days	Olympia Stadium, Detroit, Michigan, U.S.	
102	Loss	53–34–15	Johnny Green	PTS	10	Feb 29, 1944	29 years, 29 days	Memorial Auditorium, Buffalo, New York, U.S.	
101	Draw	53–33–15	Johnny Green	PTS	10	Feb 8, 1944	29 years, 8 days	Memorial Auditorium, Buffalo, New York, U.S.	
100	Loss	53–33–14	Ralph Zannelli	SD	10	Jan 27, 1944	28 years, 361 days	Boston Garden, Boston, Massachusetts, U.S.	
99	Loss	53–32–14	Ralph Zannelli	SD	10	Dec 2, 1943	28 years, 305 days	Boston Garden, Boston, Massachusetts, U.S.	
98	Win	53–31–14	Ralph Zannelli	UD	10	Nov 22, 1943	28 years, 295 days	Rhode Island Auditorium, Providence, Rhode Island, U.S.	
97	Win	52–31–14	Ernest 'Cat' Robinson	PTS	8	Nov 16, 1943	28 years, 289 days	Broadway Arena, New York City, New York, U.S.	
96	Draw	51–31–14	Vinnie Vines	PTS	10	Nov 12, 1943	28 years, 285 days	Municipal Auditorium, Norfolk, Virginia, U.S.	
95	Win	51–31–13	Al Gilbert	TKO	7 (10)	Sep 30, 1943	28 years, 242 days	Olympia A.C., Philadelphia, Pennsylvania, U.S.	
94	Loss	50–31–13	Reuben Shank	PTS	10	Sep 24, 1943	28 years, 236 days	Municipal Auditorium, Norfolk, Virginia, U.S.	
93	Loss	50–30–13	Cecil Hudson	PTS	6	Aug 27, 1943	28 years, 208 days	Madison Square Garden, New York City, New York, U.S.	
92	Win	50–29–13	Bill McDowell	PTS	10	Jun 17, 1943	28 years, 137 days	Mooers Field, Richmond, Virginia, U.S.	
91	Win	49–29–13	Sammy Secreet	TKO	8 (10)	Mar 31, 1943	28 years, 59 days	Arena, Cleveland, Ohio, U.S.	
90	Win	48–29–13	Bobby Richardson	PTS	10	Feb 23, 1943	28 years, 23 days	Arena, Cleveland, Ohio, U.S.	
89	Loss	47–29–13	Jackie Cooper	PTS	10	Feb 9, 1943	28 years, 9 days	Broadway Arena, New York City, New York, U.S.	
88	Win	47–28–13	Andres Gomez	PTS	10	Jan 19, 1943	27 years, 353 days	Broadway Arena, New York City, New York, U.S.	
87	Loss	46–28–13	Sugar Ray Robinson	TKO	8 (10)	Dec 1, 1942	27 years, 304 days	Arena, Cleveland, Ohio, U.S.	
86	Loss	46–27–13	Sugar Ray Robinson	UD	10	Oct 19, 1942	27 years, 261 days	Arena, Philadelphia, Pennsylvania, U.S.	
85	Win	46–26–13	Freddie Cabral	RTD	6 (10)	Sep 21, 1942	27 years, 233 days	Valley Arena, Holyoke, Massachusetts, U.S.	
84	Loss	45–26–13	Eddie Booker	PTS	10	Aug 24, 1942	27 years, 205 days	Coliseum Bowl, San Francisco, California, U.S.	
83	Win	45–25–13	Johnny Walker	PTS	8	Jul 7, 1942	27 years, 157 days	Shibe Park, Philadelphia, Pennsylvania, U.S.	
82	Win	44–25–13	Joey Spangler	PTS	10	Jun 18, 1942	27 years, 138 days	Mooers Field, Richmond, Virginia, U.S.	
81	Loss	43–25–13	Johnny Jackson	SD	10	Jun 8, 1942	27 years, 128 days	Coliseum, Baltimore, Maryland, U.S.	
80	Win	43–24–13	Jackie Cooper	PTS	10	May 5, 1942	27 years, 94 days	Broadway Arena, New York City, New York, U.S.	
79	Loss	42–24–13	Saverio Turiello	PTS	10	Apr 24, 1942	27 years, 83 days	City Auditorium, Birmingham, Alabama, U.S.	
78	Loss	42–23–13	Fritzie Zivic	RTD	4 (10)	Mar 9, 1942	27 years, 37 days	Duquesne Gardens, Pittsburgh, Pennsylvania, U.S.	
77	Win	42–22–13	Ossie Harris	UD	10	Feb 9, 1942	27 years, 9 days	Duquesne Gardens, Pittsburgh, Pennsylvania, U.S.	
76	Loss	41–22–13	Coley Welch	KO	7 (8)	Nov 14, 1941	26 years, 287 days	Madison Square Garden, New York City, New York, U.S.	
75	Win	41–21–13	Lou Schwartz	PTS	10	Oct 7, 1941	26 years, 249 days	Broadway Arena, New York City, New York, U.S.	
74	Win	40–21–13	Herbert Lewis Hardwick	PTS	10	Aug 5, 1941	26 years, 186 days	Ebbets Field, New York City, New York, U.S.	
73	Win	39–21–13	Frank Velez	PTS	10	Jul 10, 1941	26 years, 160 days	Stack Arena, Norwalk, Virginia, U.S.	
72	Win	38–21–13	Jimmy Leto	SD	15	Apr 14, 1941	26 years, 73 days	Coliseum, Baltimore, Maryland, U.S.	Retained Maryland world welterweight title
71	Loss	37–21–13	Georgie Abrams	SD	10	Dec 12, 1940	25 years, 316 days	Coliseum, Baltimore, Maryland, U.S.	
70	Win	37–20–13	Augie Arellano	PTS	8	Nov 9, 1940	25 years, 283 days	Ridgewood Grove, New York City, New York, U.S.	
69	Win	36–20–13	Herbert Lewis Hardwick	SD	15	Oct 14, 1940	25 years, 257 days	Carlin's Park, Baltimore, Maryland, U.S.	Won vacant Maryland world welterweight title
68	Win	35–20–13	Holman Williams	PTS	10	Sep 4, 1940	25 years, 217 days	Griffith Stadium, Washington, D.C., U.S.	
67	Win	34–20–13	Steve Mamakos	UD	10	Apr 10, 1940	25 years, 70 days	Riverside Stadium, Washington, D.C., U.S.	
66	Loss	33–20–13	Holman Williams	UD	10	Mar 27, 1940	25 years, 56 days	Watres Armory, Scranton, Pennsylvania, U.S.	
65	Win	33–19–13	Jackie Burke	UD	10	Feb 7, 1940	25 years, 7 days	Watres Armory, Scranton, Pennsylvania, U.S.	
64	Draw	32–19–13	Holman Williams	PTS	10	Dec 13, 1939	24 years, 316 days	Watres Armory, Scranton, Pennsylvania, U.S.	
63	Win	32–19–12	Milo Theodorescu	PTS	8	Sep 9, 1939	24 years, 221 days	Ridgewood Grove, New York City, New York, U.S.	
62	Win	31–19–12	Andre Jessurun	PTS	10	Jul 20, 1939	24 years, 170 days	Fort Hamilton Arena, New York City, New York, U.S.	
61	Win	30–19–12	Vince Pimpinella	PTS	8	Apr 24, 1939	24 years, 83 days	Ridgewood Grove, New York City, New York, U.S.	
60	Draw	29–19–12	Gustav Eder	PTS	15	Oct 15, 1938	23 years, 257 days	Hanseatenhalle, Hamburg, Nazi Germany	
59	Loss	29–19–11	Solly Krieger	TKO	11 (12)	Apr 6, 1938	23 years, 65 days	Hippodrome, New York City, New York, U.S.	
58	Loss	29–18–11	Dick Humphries	PTS	10	Jan 25, 1938	22 years, 359 days	Sydney Sports Ground, Sydney, New South Wales, Australia	
57	Loss	29–17–11	Jack Carroll	PTS	10	Dec 21, 1937	22 years, 324 days	Sydney Sports Ground, Sydney, New South Wales, Australia	
56	Win	29–16–11	Freddie Dixon	PTS	10	Jun 18, 1937	22 years, 138 days	Municipal Stadium, Phoenix, Arizona, U.S.	
55	Loss	28–16–11	Glen Lee	PTS	10	May 28, 1937	22 years, 117 days	Wrigley Field, Los Angeles, California, U.S.	
54	Loss	28–15–11	Barney Ross	UD	15	Nov 27, 1936	21 years, 301 days	Madison Square Garden, New York City, New York, U.S.	For NYSAC, NBA, and The Ring welterweight titles
53	Draw	28–14–11	Ceferino Garcia	PTS	15	Oct 30, 1936	21 years, 273 days	Madison Square Garden, New York City, New York, U.S.	
52	Win	28–14–10	Gustav Eder	PTS	15	Sep 21, 1936	21 years, 234 days	St. Nicholas Arena, New York City, New York, U.S.	
51	Win	27–14–10	Johnny Jadick	PTS	10	Jul 22, 1936	21 years, 173 days	Dyckman Oval, New York City, New York, U.S.	
50	Win	26–14–10	Steve Halaiko	KO	4 (10)	Jul 6, 1936	21 years, 157 days	Dexter Park Arena, New York City, New York, U.S.	
49	Win	25–14–10	Billy Celebron	PTS	10	May 4, 1936	21 years, 94 days	St. Nicholas Arena, New York City, New York, U.S.	
48	Loss	24–14–10	Cleto Locatelli	PTS	10	Feb 21, 1936	21 years, 21 days	Madison Square Garden, New York City, New York, U.S.	
47	Loss	24–13–10	Cleto Locatelli	PTS	10	Dec 9, 1935	20 years, 312 days	St. Nicholas Arena, New York City, New York, U.S.	
46	Draw	24–12–10	Harry Dublinsky	PTS	10	Oct 21, 1935	20 years, 263 days	St. Nicholas Arena, New York City, New York, U.S.	
45	Draw	24–12–9	Harry Dublinsky	PTS	10	Sep 16, 1935	20 years, 228 days	St. Nicholas Arena, New York City, New York, U.S.	
44	Loss	24–12–8	Jimmy Leto	PTS	10	Aug 19, 1935	20 years, 200 days	Dexter Park Arena, New York City, New York, U.S.	
43	Win	24–11–8	Babe Marino	PTS	8	Jul 15, 1935	20 years, 165 days	Dexter Park Arena, New York City, New York, U.S.	
42	Win	23–11–8	Mickey Serrian	PTS	8	Jul 1, 1935	20 years, 151 days	Dexter Park Arena, New York City, New York, U.S.	
41	Loss	22–11–8	Mickey Serrian	PTS	8	Apr 20, 1935	20 years, 79 days	Ridgewood Grove, New York City, New York, U.S.	
40	Win	22–10–8	Phil Furr	UD	10	Apr 15, 1935	20 years, 74 days	Auditorium, Washington, D.C., U.S.	
39	Loss	21–10–8	Kid Azteca	PTS	10	Mar 2, 1935	20 years, 30 days	Arena Nacional, Mexico City, Distrito Federal, Mexico	
38	Win	21–9–8	Jackie Davis	PTS	8	Feb 16, 1935	20 years, 16 days	Ridgewood Grove, New York City, New York, U.S.	
37	Loss	20–9–8	Jackie Davis	PTS	8	Jan 26, 1935	19 years, 360 days	Ridgewood Grove, New York City, New York, U.S.	
36	Win	20–8–8	Tony Falco	PTS	10	Jan 7, 1935	19 years, 341 days	St. Nicholas Arena, New York City, New York, U.S.	
35	Win	19–8–8	Steve Halaiko	PTS	8	Dec 8, 1934	19 years, 311 days	Ridgewood Grove, New York City, New York, U.S.	
34	Win	18–8–8	Al Casimini	PTS	8	Nov 26, 1934	19 years, 299 days	St. Nicholas Arena, New York City, New York, U.S.	
33	Win	17–8–8	Joe Rossi	PTS	6	Nov 17, 1934	19 years, 290 days	Ridgewood Grove, New York City, New York, U.S.	
32	Draw	16–8–8	Morrie Sherman	PTS	8	Oct 29, 1934	19 years, 271 days	St. Nicholas Arena, New York City, New York, U.S.	
31	Win	16–8–7	Joe Mulli	TKO	3 (8)	Sep 20, 1934	19 years, 232 days	Fort Hamilton Arena, New York City, New York, U.S.	
30	Win	15–8–7	Danny Levine	PTS	6	Aug 14, 1934	19 years, 195 days	Coney Island Velodrome, New York City, New York, U.S.	
29	Loss	14–8–7	Kenny LaSalle	PTS	6	Jul 17, 1934	19 years, 167 days	Coney Island Velodrome, New York City, New York, U.S.	
28	Win	14–7–7	Mickey Paul	PTS	6	Jul 10, 1934	19 years, 160 days	Coney Island Velodrome, New York City, New York, U.S.	
27	Win	13–7–7	Stanislaus Loayza	PTS	6	May 31, 1934	19 years, 120 days	Fort Hamilton Arena, New York City, New York, U.S.	
26	Loss	12–7–7	Jack Lowery	PTS	6	May 5, 1934	19 years, 94 days	Ridgewood Grove, New York City, New York, U.S.	
25	Win	12–6–7	Murray Brandt	PTS	6	Apr 21, 1934	19 years, 80 days	Ridgewood Grove, New York City, New York, U.S.	
24	Draw	11–6–7	Joe Rossi	PTS	6	Apr 4, 1934	19 years, 63 days	Broadway Arena, New York City, New York, U.S.	
23	Win	11–6–6	Sal Canata	PTS	6	Mar 5, 1934	19 years, 33 days	Valley Arena, Holyoke, Massachusetts, U.S.	
22	Draw	10–6–6	Teddy Loder	PTS	6	Mar 3, 1934	19 years, 31 days	Ridgewood Grove, New York City, New York, U.S.	
21	Draw	10–6–5	Jack Lowery	PTS	6	Feb 17, 1934	19 years, 17 days	Ridgewood Grove, New York City, New York, U.S.	
20	Draw	10–6–4	Teddy Loder	PTS	6	Jan 31, 1934	19 years, 0 days	Broadway Arena, New York City, New York, U.S.	
19	Win	10–6–3	Sammy Kanter	PTS	6	Jan 13, 1934	18 years, 347 days	Ridgewood Grove, New York City, New York, U.S.	
18	Win	9–6–3	Joe Pennino	PTS	6	Dec 12, 1933	18 years, 315 days	Ridgewood Grove, New York City, New York, U.S.	
17	Loss	8–6–3	Joe Rossi	PTS	6	Sep 30, 1933	18 years, 242 days	Ridgewood Grove, New York City, New York, U.S.	
16	Loss	8–5–3	Meyer Rowan	PTS	6	Sep 23, 1933	18 years, 235 days	Ridgewood Grove, New York City, New York, U.S.	
15	Win	8–4–3	Pedro Nieves	PTS	6	Sep 11, 1933	18 years, 223 days	Fugazy Bowl, New York City, New York, U.S.	
14	Win	7–4–3	Joey Delmaschio	PTS	6	Aug 17, 1933	18 years, 198 days	Fort Hamilton Arena, New York City, New York, U.S.	
13	Win	6–4–3	Jimmy Sherlaw	PTS	4	Jul 28, 1933	18 years, 178 days	Clarkston County Club, Nyack, New York, U.S.	
12	Loss	5–4–3	Murray Brandt	PTS	6	Jul 24, 1933	18 years, 174 days	Starlight Park, New York City, New York, U.S.	
11	Win	5–3–3	Sammy Kanter	PTS	5	Jul 5, 1933	18 years, 155 days	Starlight Park, New York City, New York, U.S.	
10	Win	4–3–3	Johnny Williams	PTS	4	Jun 19, 1933	18 years, 139 days	Starlight Park, New York City, New York, U.S.	
9	Draw	3–3–3	Sid Silas	PTS	6	Jun 3, 1933	18 years, 123 days	Ridgewood Grove, New York City, New York, U.S.	
8	Draw	3–3–2	Willie Lewis	PTS	4	May 22, 1933	18 years, 111 days	St. Nicholas Arena, New York City, New York, U.S.	
7	Draw	3–3–1	Marty Silvers	PTS	4	Apr 15, 1933	18 years, 74 days	Ridgewood Grove, New York City, New York, U.S.	
6	Loss	3–3	Sammy Kanter	PTS	4	Apr 1, 1933	18 years, 60 days	Ridgewood Grove, New York City, New York, U.S.	
5	Win	3–2	Mickey O'Connor	PTS	4	Mar 13, 1933	18 years, 41 days	New York Coliseum, New York City, New York, U.S.	
4	Loss	2–2	Al Haslem	PTS	5	Feb 6, 1933	18 years, 6 days	New York Coliseum, New York City, New York, U.S.	
3	Win	2–1	Ralph Esposito	TKO	1 (4)	Jan 30, 1933	17 years, 365 days	New York Coliseum, New York City, New York, U.S.	
2	Win	1–1	Joe Melletti	PTS	4	Jan 17, 1933	17 years, 352 days	New Lenox S.C., New York City, New York, U.S.	
1	Loss	0–1	Willie Miller	PTS	4	Dec 6, 1932	17 years, 310 days	New Lenox S.C., New York City, New York, U.S.	
