= Billy Soose =

American boxer

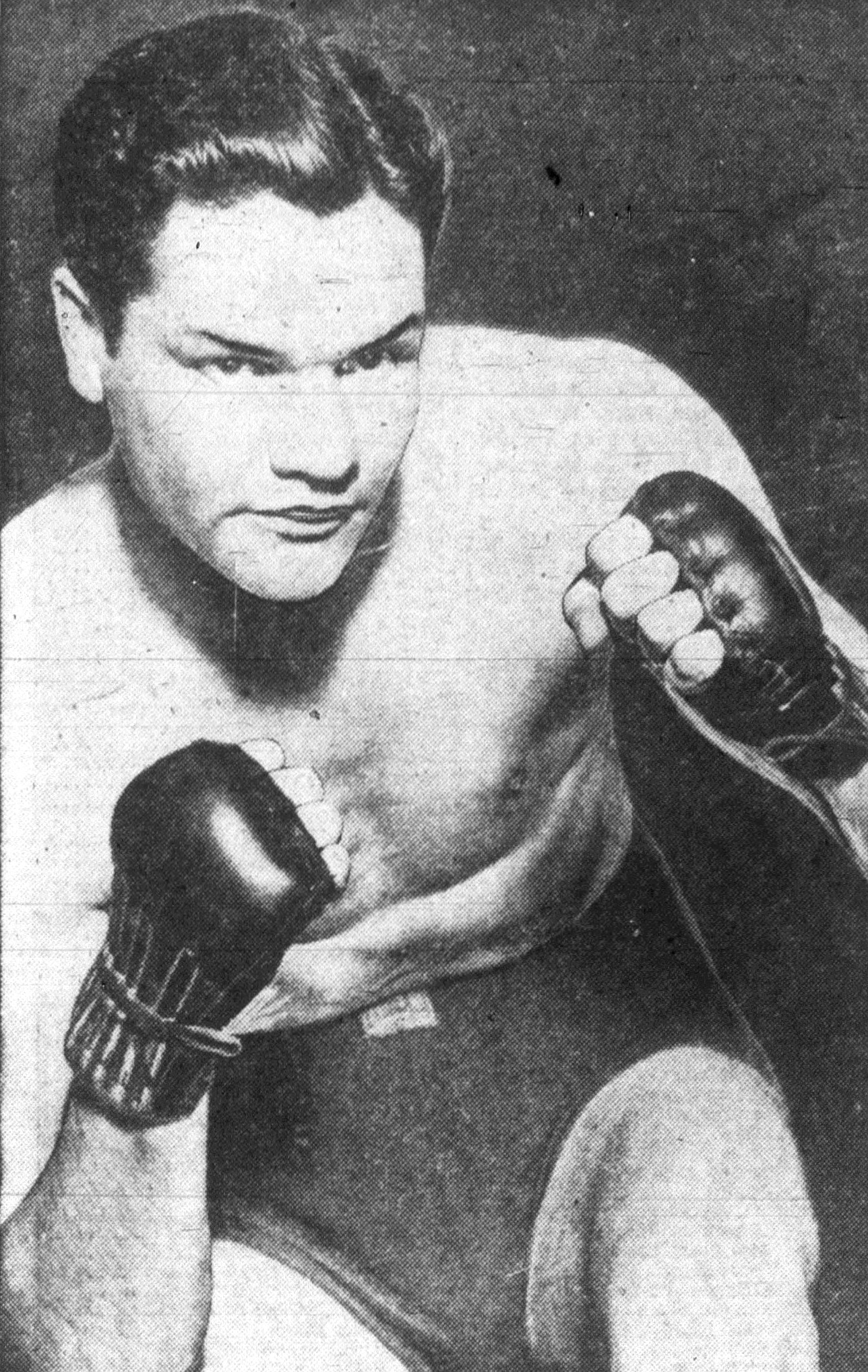
- Soose, circa 1941

Personal information
- Born: Billy Soose; August 2, 1915 Farrell, Pennsylvania, U.S.
- Died: September 5, 1998 (aged 83) Tafton, Pennsylvania, U.S.
- Height: 6 ft 0 in (1.83 m)
- Weight: Middleweight

Boxing career
- Stance: Orthodox

Boxing record
- Total fights: 41
- Wins: 34
- Win by KO: 13
- Losses: 6
- Draws: 1

Billy Soose (August 2, 1915 – September 5, 1998) was an American boxer who won the world middleweight championship in 1941.

== Biography ==
Soose was undefeated in his collegiate boxing career at Penn State and was a three-time Golden Gloves winner before turning professional in 1938.

By the end of his first year in the paid ranks he had beaten the former world champion Eddie Babe Risko although he lost a unanimous decision to Charley Burley. In 1940 Soose defeated two future middleweight champions, Ken Overlin and Tony Zale. He began 1941 by defeating future heavyweight and light heavyweight title challenger Tami Mauriello. In May of that year he challenged Overlin for the middleweight title at Madison Square Garden and won by a controversial, but unanimous points decision. He made no defences and in November it was reported that he had relinquished the championship in order to pursue the light-heavyweight title.

After losing a bout to light-heavyweight contender Jimmy Bivins in January 1942 Soose joined the United States Navy and retired from professional boxing at the age of twenty-six.

Soose was featured on the cover of the June 1941 Ring magazine and is a member of the World Boxing Hall of Fame. He is also the subject of a book, Billy Soose - The Champion Time Forgot. He was inducted into the International Boxing Hall of Fame in 2009.

Soose was found dead at his home at Tafton, Pennsylvania in 1998.

== Professional boxing record ==
| 40 fights | 33 wins | 6 losses |
|---|---|---|
| By knockout | 13 | 0 |
| By decision | 20 | 6 |
| Draws | 1 | |

| No. | Result | Record | Opponent | Type | Round | Date | Location | Notes |
|---|---|---|---|---|---|---|---|---|
| 41 | Loss | 34–6–1 | Jimmy Bivins | UD | 10 | Jan 13, 1942 | Arena, Cleveland, Ohio, U.S. | |
| 40 | Win | 34–5–1 | Jimmy Reeves | PTS | 10 | Dec 18, 1941 | Arena, Cleveland, Ohio, U.S. | |
| 39 | Draw | 33–5–1 | Ceferino Garcia | TD | 8 (12) | Jul 30, 1941 | Gilmore Field, Los Angeles, California, U.S. | Bout was halted due to an eye injury suffered by Soose |
| 38 | Loss | 33–5 | Georgie Abrams | UD | 10 | Jul 30, 1941 | Madison Square Garden, New York City, New York, U.S. | |
| 37 | Win | 33–4 | Tony Celli | TKO | 2 (10) | Jul 11, 1941 | Sportman's Park, Cleveland, Ohio, U.S. | |
| 36 | Win | 32–4 | Ken Overlin | UD | 15 | May 9, 1941 | Madison Square Garden, New York City, New York, U.S. | Won NYSAC middleweight title |
| 35 | Win | 31–4 | Ernie Vigh | PTS | 12 | Mar 7, 1941 | Madison Square Garden, New York City, New York, U.S. | |
| 34 | Win | 30–4 | Ernie Vigh | UD | 10 | Feb 7, 1941 | Madison Square Garden, New York City, New York, U.S. | |
| 33 | Win | 29–4 | Tami Mauriello | SD | 10 | Jan 3, 1941 | Madison Square Garden, New York City, New York, U.S. | |
| 32 | Win | 28–4 | Jimmy Casino | PTS | 10 | Dec 13, 1940 | Legion Stadium, Hollywood, California, U.S. | |
| 31 | Win | 27–4 | Vince Pimpinella | UD | 10 | Nov 7, 1940 | South Main Street Armory, Wilkes-Barre, Pennsylvania, U.S. | |
| 30 | Win | 26–4 | Tony Zale | UD | 10 | Aug 21, 1940 | Mills Stadium, Chicago, Illinois, U.S. | |
| 29 | Win | 25–4 | Ken Overlin | SD | 10 | Jul 24, 1940 | Scranton Stadium, Scranton, Pennsylvania, U.S. | |
| 28 | Win | 24–4 | Jack Ennis | PTS | 10 | May 30, 1940 | Memorial Field, Williamsport, Pennsylvania, U.S. | |
| 27 | Win | 23–4 | Ernest Peirce | PTS | 10 | May 15, 1940 | Scranton Stadium, Scranton, Pennsylvania, U.S. | |
| 26 | Win | 22–4 | Frankie Nelson | PTS | 10 | Mar 25, 1940 | Rayen-Wood Auditorium, Youngstown, Ohio, U.S. | |
| 25 | Win | 21–4 | Enzo Iannozzi | KO | 4 (10) | Mar 5, 1940 | Watres Armory, Scranton, Pennsylvania, U.S. | |
| 24 | Loss | 20–4 | Georgie Abrams | UD | 10 | Feb 12, 1940 | Duquesne Gardens, Pittsburgh, Pennsylvania, U.S. | |
| 23 | Win | 20–3 | Bud Mignault | UD | 10 | Jan 29, 1940 | Arena, Philadelphia, Pennsylvania, U.S. | |
| 22 | Win | 19–3 | Jimmy Clark | TKO | 3 (10) | Jan 22, 1940 | Town Hall, Scranton, Pennsylvania, U.S. | |
| 21 | Win | 18–3 | Vince Pimpinella | PTS | 8 | Jan 15, 1940 | Public Hall, Cleveland, Ohio, U.S. | |
| 20 | Win | 17–3 | Jimmy Jones | TKO | 5 (6) | Dec 19, 1939 | Metropolitan Opera House, Philadelphia, Pennsylvania, U.S. | |
| 19 | Win | 16–3 | Paul Pirrone | PTS | 6 | Dec 11, 1939 | Arena, Cleveland, Ohio, U.S. | |
| 18 | Win | 15–3 | Butch Lynch | KO | 4 (10) | Nov 29, 1939 | South Main Street Armory, Wilkes-Barre, Pennsylvania, U.S. | |
| 17 | Win | 14–3 | Johnny Duca | UD | 10 | Nov 15, 1939 | Watres Armory, Scranton, Pennsylvania, U.S. | |
| 16 | Win | 13–3 | Jack Munley | TKO | 5 (10) | Oct 18, 1939 | Watres Armory, Scranton, Pennsylvania, U.S. | |
| 15 | Loss | 12–3 | Georgie Abrams | UD | 8 | Sep 25, 1939 | Forbes Field, Pittsburgh, Pennsylvania, U.S. | |
| 14 | Win | 12–2 | Joe Fedz | TKO | 1 (10) | Sep 11, 1939 | Rochester, New York, U.S. | |
| 13 | Win | 11–2 | Johnny Duca | PTS | 10 | Feb 20, 1939 | Youngstown, Ohio, U.S. | |
| 12 | Loss | 10–2 | Charley Burley | UD | 10 | Nov 21, 1938 | Motor Square Garden, Pittsburgh, Pennsylvania, U.S. | |
| 11 | Loss | 10–1 | Johnny Duca | MD | 10 | Oct 13, 1938 | Maple Grove Field House, Lancaster, Pennsylvania, U.S. | |
| 10 | Win | 10–0 | Eddie Babe Risko | KO | 3 (10) | Oct 5, 1938 | Motor Square Garden, Pittsburgh, Pennsylvania, U.S. | |
| 9 | Win | 9–0 | Charley Weise | KO | 2 (10) | Sep 13, 1938 | Farrell High Athletic Field, Farrell, Pennsylvania, U.S. | |
| 8 | Win | 8–0 | Freddie Lenn | UD | 10 | Aug 29, 1938 | Hickey Park, Millvale, Pennsylvania, U.S. | |
| 7 | Win | 7–0 | Eric Lawson | TKO | 5 (8) | Aug 2, 1938 | Clearfield Park, Clearfield, Pennsylvania, U.S. | |
| 6 | Win | 6–0 | Al Quaill | UD | 10 | Jul 25, 1938 | Forbes Field, Pittsburgh, Pennsylvania, U.S. | |
| 5 | Win | 5–0 | Johnny Foster | PTS | 4 | Jun 17, 1938 | Gilmore Stadium, Los Angeles, California, U.S. | |
| 4 | Win | 4–0 | Joe Lujan | TKO | 3 (6) | Jun 6, 1938 | Long Beach Arena, Long Beach, California, U.S. | |
| 3 | Win | 3–0 | Sewell Hipps | TKO | 4 (4) | Apr 5, 1938 | Olympic Auditorium, Los Angeles, California, U.S. | |
| 2 | Win | 2–0 | Jimmy Brent | PTS | 4 | Mar 29, 1938 | Olympic Auditorium, Los Angeles, California, U.S. | |
| 1 | Win | 1–0 | Marine Johnny Dean | TKO | 4 (4) | Mar 15, 1938 | Olympic Auditorium, Los Angeles, California, U.S. | |
