= Anton Raadik =

Estonian boxer

- Born: January 15, 1917; Raikküla, Kreis Harrien, Governorate of Estonia, Russian Empire
- Died: March 13, 1999 (aged 82); Chicago, Illinois
- Other names: Rampaging Estonian
- Nationality: Estonia
- Height: 1.75 m (5 ft 9 in)
- Weight: 168 lb (76 kg; 12.0 st)
- Division: Middleweight
- Stance: Orthodox
- Fighting out of: Chicago, Illinois
- Years active: 1940–1952

Professional boxing record
- Total: 63
- Wins: 37
- By knockout: 26
- Losses: 25
- By knockout: 9
- Draws: 1

Amateur boxing record
- Total: 130
- Wins: 118
- Losses: 12

Other information
- Boxing record from BoxRec
- Last updated on: August 8, 2009

Anton "Rampaging Estonian" Raadik (January 15, 1917 – March 13, 1999) was the most famous Estonian-born middleweight boxer of the 1940s and 1950s, fighting out of Chicago, Illinois.

== Professional boxing career ==
Anton Raadik was European Middleweight Champion in 1939. On May 13, 1939, he lost a three-round decision to middleweight Jimmy Reeves in Chicago in the International Golden Gloves. In all, he had a reported 130 amateur fights, winning 118.

In 1940 and 1941 he had his first three professional fights in Moscow. In 1943 he won three more fights in Scandinavia, losing only to Oiva Purho in Gothenburg in 1944. Raadik fled the Soviet occupation of Estonia during World War II and settled first in Finland before moving to Sweden in 1945. He was inactive in 1945 and then moved to Chicago in 1946.

In the United States, Raadik made rapid progress and in December 1946 fought the formidable Jake LaMotta. In 1947 he lost to two famous and experienced opponents, Georgie Abrams and Al Hostak.

On October 31, 1947, he had his most famous fight, with future middleweight champion Marcel Cerdan, in Chicago. Cerdan was well ahead on points going into the tenth round, but then Raadik floored him three times and came close to stopping him, only to lose the decision.

Raadik boxed until 1952, losing more fights than he won. He fought such highly regarded opponents as Carl (Bobo) Olson, Robert Villemain, Steve Belloise, and Harry (Kid) Matthews, but his heyday had passed.

He died on March 13, 1999.

== Books ==
- Mis juhtus Anton Raadikuga? by Jaan Sepp, Juhan Maidlo - 1997. ISBN 9985-57-147-9
