= Eric Seelig =

German boxer (1909–1984)

Personal information
- Nationality: German by birth Nationalized American citizen
- Born: Erich Seelig; July 15, 1909 Bromberg, German Empire
- Died: January 19, 1984 (aged 74) Atlantic City, New Jersey, U.S.
- Height: 5 ft 8 in (1.73 m)
- Weight: Middleweight; Light heavyweight

Boxing career
- Stance: Orthodox

Boxing record
- Total fights: 62
- Wins: 41
- Win by KO: 8
- Losses: 14
- Draws: 17

Eric Seelig (July 15, 1909, in Bromberg, now Bydgoszcz – January 19, 1984) was middleweight boxing champion in Germany in 1931 and their light-heavyweight champion in 1933. Because he was Jewish, he was stripped of his titles, and, in July 1933, the Nazis threatened that if he dared to fight another match to defend his titles he would be killed. Seelig fled to France, though his stripped titles were never restored. He had a successful boxing career in America from 1935 to 1940.

== Early life and amateur boxing career ==
Eric Seelig was born on July 15, 1909, in Bromberg, Germany. When he was nine, his family moved to Berlin and in the period before Hitler, he became Germany's Amateur Middleweight Champion.

== Professional boxing career ==
Seelig won his first twelve professional matches in Germany, from February 1931 to March 1932. This period included his winning the German national middleweight title.

== German BDB middle and light heavy champ 1931, 1933 ==
On November 12, 1931, Seelig took the German middleweight championship in a twelve points decision against Hans Seifried at Zircus Busch in Mitte, Germany.

On February 26, 1933, Seelig defeated Helmut Hartkopp in a twelve-round points decision at the Flora Theatre to take the German BDB Light Heavyweight Title.

Eric and his parents then moved to France. Seelig competed in France for a few years, also boxing in Belgium and England. He emigrated to the United States via Cuba in 1935. In his remaining career, he fought nearly every top middleweight contender of his era. He enjoyed success in the U.S. compiling a career record of 57 bouts, 40 victories (9 KOs), 7 draws, and 10 losses, and he would fight against several champions including reigning IBU world middleweight champion Marcel Thil, former world middleweight champion Freddy Yarosz, world middleweight champion Fred Apostoli, and reigning world middleweight champion Al Hostak. One of his highest rankings in The Ring was #6 in 1938, though he would climb as high as #5 between 1935-40.

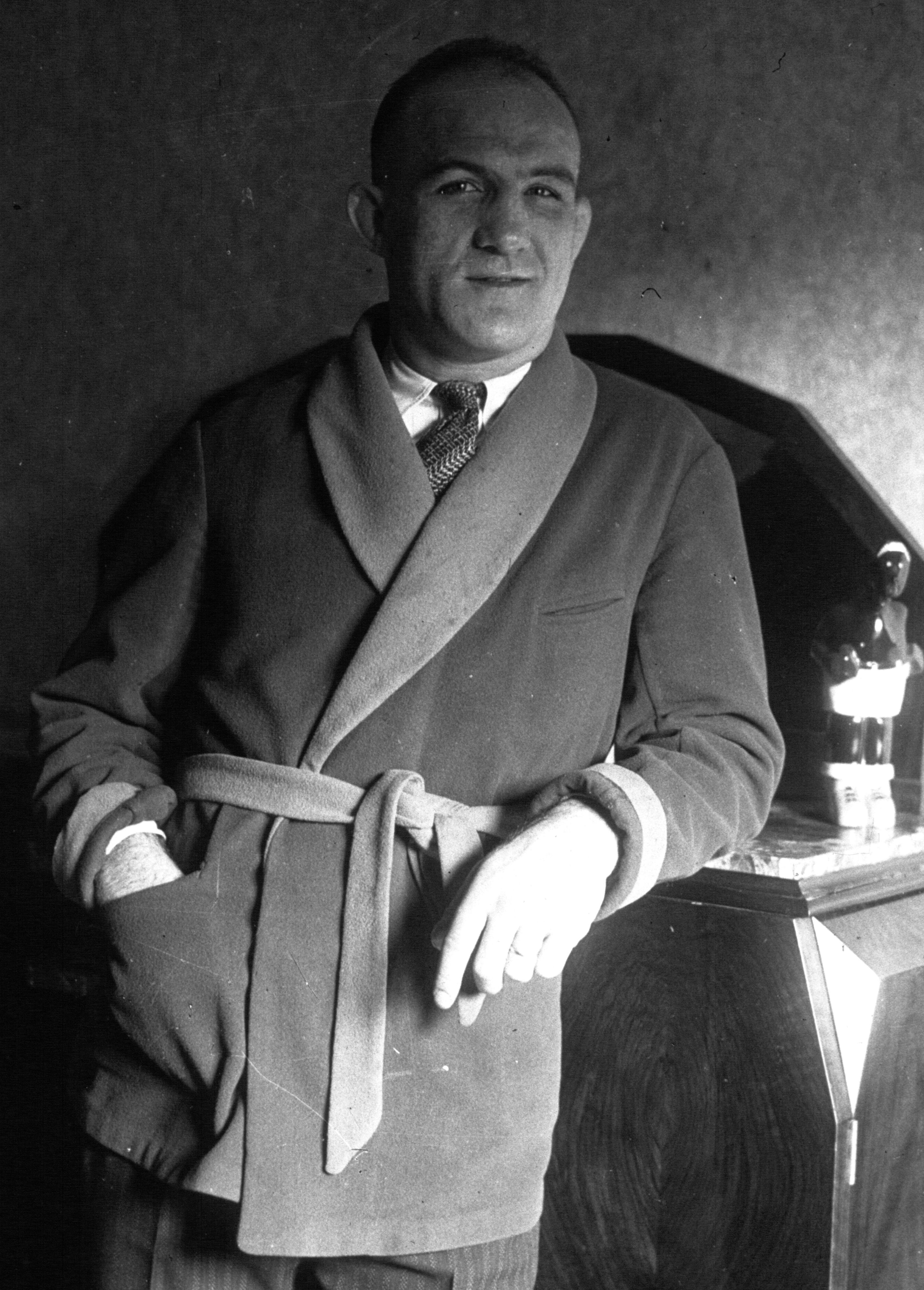
Marcel Thil

On May 22, 1933, Seelig fought an important bout against IBU world middleweight champion Marcel Thil at the Palais de Sports in Paris, losing in a twelve-round points decision. Thil was also the former holder of the NBA world middleweight title, and would later hold the European light heavyweight title in 1934. By a few accounts, Seelig's May bout with Thil was for the world title, but the boxers were overweight according to Le Petit Parisien. On January 29, 1934, Seelig fought Marcel Thil again in Paris, losing in a twelve-round points decision.

=== European middleweight title attempt, 1934 ===
Seelig competed unsuccessfully for the EBU European Middleweight Title on March 17, 1934, against Gustave Roth, losing in a fifteen rounds points decision in Brussels, Belgium. He would lose again to Roth at the Palais de Sport in Brussels on October 31, 1934, in a twelve-round points decision.

Seelig won a ten-round points decision against black Cuban boxer Kid Tunero on September 28, 1934, at the Salle Wagram in Paris. Tunero had attempted to take the IBU world middleweight title in October 1933 against French champion Marcel Thil, and would again try for the title against Thil in July 1935.

== Highlights of bouts with top contenders in America ==
In his first fight in American on September 11, 1935, he knocked out Italian Al Rossi in the eighth round at St. Nicholas Arena. Seelig blasted Rossi around the ring for seven rounds with both lefts and rights, backing him into the ropes, and landing dangerous hooks. Fifty-five seconds into the eighth, Seelig threw his signature overhand right to the jaw of Rossi and ended the bout. Lacking boxing science and appearing wild at times when he took head shots while wading in, Seelig continued his attack, nonetheless, and rocked Rossi with hooks to the face and damaging blows to the midsection.

In only his second bout in New York, Seelig knocked out Charley Bellanger on November 11, 1935, to a winning reception, fifty-two seconds into the fourth round at New York's St. Nicholas arena. An overhand right to the point of the jaw, preceded by a storm of lightning fast blows to the head and body, dropped Bellanger for the count. After Seelig was momentarily down to one knee from a terrific right hook to the jaw, he fought cautiously, realizing that long range fighting would not be his best bet against Bellanger who had a slight advantage in reach. Another right to the chin put Bellanger down momentarily in the second. The Brooklyn Daily Eagle, wrote, "a fighting heart, a will to win and two strong arms that keep whirling like a windmill...have combined to enlist the hearts of American fighting fans to his side." The New York crowd gave him an enormous hand at the end of the bout.

=== Victory over ex-champion Mickey Walker, 1935 ===
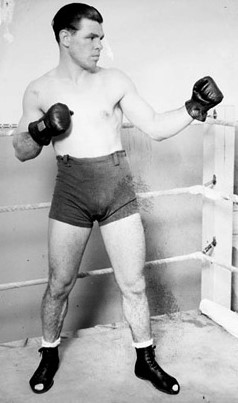
Mickey Walker

In an impressive victory on December 2, 1935, Seelig defeated Mickey Walker, American former holder of both the world middleweight and welterweight championships, in the seventh round of a ten-round bout at New York's St. Nicholas Arena. A bad cut over Walker's left eye caused the referee to call the fight 2:31 into the seventh round. Seelig was in front by a wide margin when the fight was called.

Seelig won a unanimous fifteen-round decision against leading contender Paul Pirrone in Cleveland, Ohio, on December 16, 1935, retaining his standings in the top ten world middleweights. He came back to win after being knocked down in the second round by a stiff punch to the chin. In a clear cut victory, Seelig continued to box well after fracturing his hand in the fifth round. It was his fourth win since arriving in America.

On May 10, 1938, Seelig lost to highly rated contender Billy Conn in a ten-round mixed decision at the Motor Square Garden in Pittsburgh. Conn would become a world light heavyweight champion the following year. In close bout before a modest crowd of 1,200, Seelig was given three rounds, Conn took five, and two were declared even. Seelig blasted Conn in the sixth with a right uppercut that sent him to the ropes. Conn dominated the last three rounds with high pressured infighting that smothered Seelig, and gave a significant points advantage to Conn. Conn held a slight advantage in the infighting, with a five-inch advantage in height, giving him roughly a three-inch or ten centimeter advantage in reach.

Seelig outpointed Carmen Barth on October 14, 1938, at Legion Stadium in Hollywood before a crowd of 4,500. In the infighting, though suffering from a slight reach disadvantage, Seelig scored with frequent left hooks and right crosses, and in the seventh Seelig had Barth shaking at the knees but could not put him to the canvas for a knockout. Seelig dropped the first round from a foul, but used his vicious left hook to gain a points advantage in six of the ten rounds with three to Barth, according to the Los Angeles Times. Barth had defeated Seelig one year earlier in an eight-round decision in Cleveland on December 6, 1937. In April 1937, Seelig defeated Barth in a ten-round points decision at Public Hall in Cleveland in what the Ring magazine described as "one of the greatest fights in the history of the fight game."

Seelig defeated future NYSAC world middleweight champion Ken Overlin on December 20, 1938, in a close ten round unanimous points decision before 8,100, at New York Colliseum in the Bronx. Seelig lost the third as the results of a low punch, but took the first two on hard rights to the head and body, but after the fourth, he lost ground with continuous body punches from Seelig, which the crowd may not have noticed. In the last two rounds, Overlin switched to blows to the head, and scored again, but was too far behind in scoring to take the decision. There were no knockdowns in the bout. Seelig lost to Overlin in a ten-round points decision at Chicago Stadium on June 8, 1939. Seelig showed more aggression which won him fans in the audience, but Overlin landed more effective punches and allowed him to win decisively.

Seelig drew with Teddy Yarosz, former world middleweight champion, before a crowd of 7,937, on February 3, 1939, at New York's shrine to boxing, Madison Square Garden in an eight-round bout, but still retained a top ten world standing among middleweights. In the second, the close bout saw Yarosz drop Seelig for a two count. Seelig evened up the bout by scoring repeatedly in close fighting.

=== Match with World middle champ, Apostoli, 1939 ===
On May 1, 1939, before 3,500 fans, accomplished world middleweight champion Fred Apostoli won an unpopular ten round points decision over Seelig in Cleveland, Ohio. Seelig's best round was the seventh when he smashed Apostoli's jaw with a right that caused the champion to clinch and cover, and gained the support of a number of fans. Nonetheless, judges gave Apostoli, the reigning champion, seven of the ten rounds.

=== World Middle title attempt, 1939 ===
On December 11, 1939, Seelig fought an NBA world middleweight title match against Al Hostak before an enthusiastic crowd of 10,000 at the Arena in Cleveland, Ohio, losing in a first-round knockout of a scheduled fifteen rounds. Seelig sparred cautiously in the opening of the round, but was sent to the canvas from a crushing left hook to the right side of his jaw, and could not resume the bout until a count of nine was completed. A left and right put him to the canvas for the count 1:21 into the first round.

In his last bout, Seelig lost to top rated heavyweight contender Tami Mauriello in the feature fight at the Bronx's New York Colliseum in a seventh-round technical knockout on December 3, 1940. Seelig was hammered about the head and body in the sixth, and in the seventh, after arising, turned his back to Mauriello, when the referee called the bout.

== Life after boxing ==
Seelig married his wife Greta in the United States. She was also an athlete persecuted under the Nazi regime, and was not allowed to compete in the Berlin Olympics in 1936, where she would have participated in the hurdles race, having already qualified. After boxing retirement, he moved to New Jersey in 1942 and worked on a poultry farm with his wife, Greta, and son. In 1974, he opened an Atlantic City boxing gym and helped to mentor nine Golden Gloves champions. He was elected to the New Jersey Boxing Hall of Fame in November 1999, and the International Jewish Sports Hall of Fame.

== Selected fights ==
10 Wins, 1 Draw, 5 Losses
Result	Opponent(s)	Date	Location	Duration	Notes
Win	Hans Seifried	12 Nov 1931	Mitte, Germany	12 Rounds	Won BDU German Middle title
Win	Helmut Hartkopp	26 Feb 1933	Flora Theatre	12 Rounds	Won BDU German Light-Heavy title
Loss	Marcel Thil	22 May 1933	Paris	12 Rounds; Non-title	Thil - EBU World middle champ
Loss	Gustave Roth	17 Mar 1934	Brussels, Bel.	10 Rounds	For EBU Europ. Middle title
Win	Kid Tunero	28 Sep 1934	Salle Wagram, Paris	10 Rounds	-
Win	Al Rossi	23 Sep 1935	St. Nick's, NY city	8 Round KO	-
Win	Charley Bellanger	11 Nov 1935	St. Nick's, NY city	4 Round KO	-
Win	Mickey Walker	2 Dec 1935	St. Nicks Arena, NY City	7 Round TKO	Former Middle and Welter champ
Win	Paul Pirrone	16 Dec 1935	Cleveland, OH	15 Rounds	-
Loss	Billy Conn	20 May 1938	Pittsburgh, PA	10 Rounds	1939 World Light heavy champ
Win	Carmen Barth	14 Oct 1938	Legion Stadium, Hollywood	10 Rounds	-
Win	Ken Overlin	20 Dec 1938	NY Stadium, Bronx	10 Round UD	Future World Middle champ
*Draw*	Teddy Yarosz	3 Feb 1939	Mad. Sq. Gard., NY	10 Rounds	Former World middle champ
Loss	Fred Apostoli	1 May 1939	Cleveland, Ohio	10 Round SD; Close bout	Apostoli was Middle champ
Loss	Al Hostak	11 Dec 1939	Cleveland, Ohio	1st Round KO; 10,000 fans	For NBA World Middle title
Loss	Tami Mauriello	3 Dec 1940	Bronx, NY	7th Round TKO	-
