= Raikküla =

Village in Estonia

Coordinates: 58°56′N 24°46′E

- Village
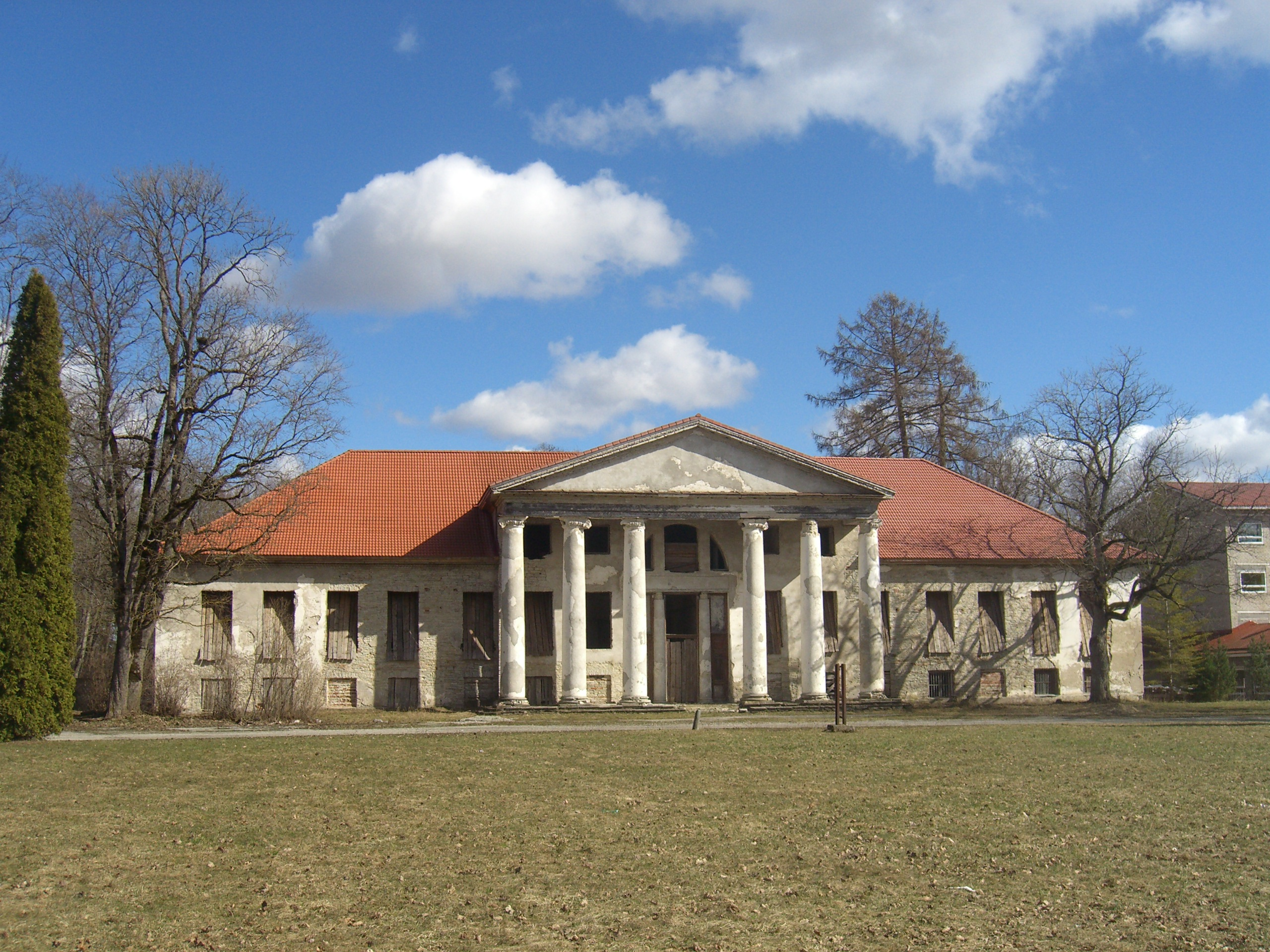
- Raikküla Manor
- Interactive map of Raikküla
- Country: Estonia
- County: Rapla County
- Parish: Rapla Parish

Population (2011)
  - Total: 256
- Time zone: UTC+2 (EET)
  - Summer (DST): UTC+3 (EEST)

Raikküla (German: Rayküll) is a village in Rapla Parish, Rapla County in northwestern Estonia. Between 1991 and 2017 (until the administrative reform of Estonian local governments) the village was located in Raikküla Parish.

Geologist and paleontologist Alexander Keyserling (1815–1891) lived in Raikküla Manor since 1847. Anton Raadik, the most famous Estonian born Middleweight boxer of the 1940s and 1950s was born in Raikküla.

Raikküla is the location of Luuka pig farm that accommodates 8,470 pigs. It is owned by OÜ Raikküla Seakasvatus and produces pigs for Rakvere Lihakombinaat.
