= Ken Overlin =

American boxer (1910–1969)

Personal information
- Nationality: American
- Born: Kenneth Edward Overlin; August 15, 1910 Decatur, Illinois, U.S.
- Died: July 24, 1969 (aged 58) Reno, Nevada, U.S.
- Height: 5 ft 9 in (1.75 m)
- Weight: Middleweight

Boxing career
- Reach: 70 in (178 cm)
- Stance: Orthodox

Boxing record
- Total fights: 167
- Wins: 136
- Win by KO: 24
- Losses: 19
- Draws: 10
- No contests: 2

Ken Overlin (August 15, 1910 – July 24, 1969), was an American-born middleweight boxer who fought professionally from 1931 to 1944, compiling a record of 131 wins (23 by knockout), 18 losses, and 9 draws. He took the World middleweight championship as recognized by the New York State Athletic Commission in a win against Ceferino Garcia in New York on May 23, 1940, and held it until May 9, 1941. Overlin was inducted into the International Boxing Hall of Fame as part of the 2015 class.

== Early life and career ==
Overlin was born to Irish parents on August 15, 1910 in Decatur, Illinois. He excelled in basketball and football at Decatur's Central Junior High. While at Decatur Senior High, he worked as a bellhop, then joined the Navy in 1927, and soon began boxing, having many of his early bouts in cities where his ship the U.S.S. Tennessee was stationed. He would do most of his boxing from 1927-31 on the West coast, but his Navy and boxing career would later be based out of Norfolk, and nearby Portsmouth, Virginia. He dropped out of the Navy in 1932, and began his boxing career under the management of Chris Dundee as a fringe middleweight contender, continuing to box around Virginia and the East Coast.

In an impressive but close win, he defeated middleweight contender and future champion Fred Apostoli in New York City's Hippodrome in a ten round mixed decision on January 27, 1937. Apostoli began the fight as a 2-1 favorite, but was unable to stop the long thrusting lefts that Overlin sent to his face throughout the bout. The AP score sheet gave Apostoli a slight edge, but two of the judges present at the bout gave Overlin eight of the ten rounds, giving a slight edge to Overlin in three rounds that the referee scored even. In the first five rounds, Overlin took a slight lead showing greater speed and mobility, and displaying greater defensive skills than his older opponent. But he was faulted by many in the crowd for his occasional holds, which he would resort to again when threatened by a highly skilled adversary.

A middleweight contender by the mid-to-late 1930s, he received his first title shot on September 11, 1937 when he was knocked out in the 4th round of a match against reigning World middleweight champion Freddie Steele in Seattle. Overlin would learn from the experience, and Steele would become the only boxer to ever defeat him by knockout.

Overlin lost to former World Middleweight champion Teddy Yarosz on March 27, 1939 in a ten round points decision in Houston, breaking an eleven match winning streak that included a single loss to Eric Seelig.

== NYSAC World middleweight champ, 1940 ==
Overlin won recognition as a World middleweight champion by the New York State Athletic Commission on May 23, 1940, when he won a unanimous decision over Ceferino Garcia before a light crowd of 7,587 at Madison Square Garden. Overlin's fast, sweeping left hook to the body tied up Garcia's dangerous right. The young challenger to the title took significant punishment in the fifth and sixth rounds, and in the seventh, Ceferino landed a near knockout punch to his right ear. The former Navy boxer persevered, recovering with a left to the body and right to the head of Ceferino. With Overlin dictating the fighting style and avoiding his opponent's deadly right, the judges credited Garcia with no more than six rounds and gave Overlin as many as ten in their scoring.

=== Loss of Middle title to Billy Soose ===
Overlin successfully defended his title twice against Steve Belloise, before losing it to Billy Soose on May 9, 1941 in a fifteen round unanimous decision before 11,676 fans at New York's Madison Square Garden. The New York Times wrote that Overlin appeared to have the upperhand in eleven of the fifteen rounds, but that Overlin probably lost points from holding at critical times in the fight to avoid blows. A supporter of the close decision for Soose, the Dunkirk Evening Observer wrote that in the ninth Soose had Overlin nearly floored with a blow to the heart, but that Overlin wisely clinched to avoid a follow up. The Observer also noted that in the tenth Soose shook Overlin again with a right, but by quickly countering, the reigning champion kept his opponent from a quick follow up that might have ended the match. The crowd booed the decision once they realized Overlin had lost the title to a twenty-five year old relatively unknown, and unrated opponent. In the close decision, one judge and one referee scored 8 rounds for Soose with seven for Overlin, though the remaining judge gave nine rounds, a slightly larger edge, to Soose. The bout was described as somewhat dull, with frequent missed blows, no knockdowns, and both boxers leaving the ring appearing relatively unscathed and unbleeding.

Overlin continued fighting without a loss until 1945, scoring notable wins over Ezzard Charles and Al Hostak, before his retirement. Before a crowd of 8,000, Overlin defeated former NBA Middleweight champion Al Hostak on November 21, 1941 in a ten round unanimous decision at Madison Square Garden. Hostak threw as many as forty rights at Overlin, but nearly all whizzed past his left cheek, as Overlin dominated the last two minutes of nearly every round, taking nearly all but one round of the fight in a unanimous decision. His win over Charles came in a ten round unanimous decision on June 9, 1941, in Cincinnati, only one month after his loss of the World middleweight title. Charles best round was the sixth, where he tagged Overlin several times with a two handed attack. Though there were no knockdowns in the bout, Charles was on his knees briefly in the second round. Charles, who had not been defeated in his last 23 bouts, fought a very close match for the first six rounds, but Overlin dominated in the final four landing solid blows, particularly in rounds eight through ten as Charles became careless hoping to makeup for lost ground.

Overlin drew with Fred Apostoli on June 26, 1942 in a close ten round draw before 7,000 fans at Norfolk's Naval base. Overlin piled up points with his signature left jab, though Apostoli, with effective punching, had Overlin in a bad condition in the seventh. Apostoli showed more aggression in the bout, tried hard for a knockout in the closing rounds, and left the ring seemingly unmarked.

== Life outside boxing ==
Interrupting his boxing career, Overlin rejoined the Navy in 1942 to serve during WWII, then in 1944, after completing his wartime service, he fought four additional fights. He fought his last recorded bout on September 26, 1944, against RJ Lewis in Denver, Colorado, winning in a ten round decision. He then returned to his hometown of Decatur, Illinois, where he ran a Tavern on East Main Street. After having to sell his Main Street Tavern in 1947 by order of the Mayor due to frequent disturbances, he operated another Tavern in Springfield. He left the Springfield bar in 1955, shortly before losing his license for serving liquor to minors. He then left Illinois, to run a bar in Vallejo, California, outside San Francisco, near the Mare Island Naval Shipyard.

After 1957, he lived in Reno, Nevada, where he worked as a bartender. He had been in ill health for the last seven years of his life as a result of an assault by a hoodlum who had pistol whipped him in May, 1962 after he had struck the man in an argument. He was required to undergo emergency surgery for skull fractures and severe scalp lacerations. Seven years after the assault, on July 24, 1969, Overlin was found dead in his Reno apartment, where he had passed a few days earlier.

== Professional boxing record ==
167 fights	136 wins	19 losses
By knockout	24	2
By decision	112	17
Draws	10	
No contests	2	

No.	Result	Record	Opponent	Type	Round	Date	Location	Notes
167	Win	136–19–10 (2)	RJ Lewis	PTS	10	Sep 26, 1942	City Auditorium, Denver, Colorado, U.S.	
166	Win	135–19–10 (2)	Paul Hartnek	PTS	10	Sep 20, 1942	Auditorium, Oakland, California, U.S.	
165	Win	134–19–10 (2)	Al LaBoa	TKO	6 (10)	Sep 12, 1942	Civic Auditorium, San Jose, California, U.S.	
164	Win	133–19–10 (2)	John Donnelly	PTS	10	Aug 31, 1942	Ice Arena, Santa Rosa, California, U.S.	
163	Draw	132–19–10 (2)	Fred Apostoli	PTS	10	Jun 26, 1942	Foreman Field, Naval Base, Norfolk, Virginia, U.S.	
162	Win	132–19–9 (2)	Paulie Mahoney	UD	10	Mar 11, 1942	Memorial Auditorium, Buffalo, New York, U.S.	
161	Draw	131–19–9 (2)	Ezzard Charles	MD	10	Mar 2, 1942	Music Hall Arena, Cincinnati, Ohio, U.S.	
160	Draw	131–19–8 (2)	Bill McDowell	PTS	10	Feb 23, 1942	Laurel Garden, Newark, New Jersey, U.S.	
159	Win	131–19–7 (2)	Mose Brown	UD	10	Dec 15, 1941	Duquesne Gardens, Pittsburgh, Pennsylvania, U.S.	
158	Win	130–19–7 (2)	Al Hostak	UD	10	Nov 21, 1941	Madison Square Garden, New York City, New York, U.S.	
157	Win	129–19–7 (2)	Al Gilbert	PTS	10	Nov 3, 1941	Municipal Auditorium, Norfolk, Virginia, U.S.	
156	Win	128–19–7 (2)	Bill McDowell	PTS	10	Sep 30, 1941	Grotto Auditorium, Jersey City, New Jersey, U.S.	
155	Win	127–19–7 (2)	Young Crawford	TKO	3 (10)	Sep 8, 1941	Bowman Gray Stadium, Winston-Salem, North Carolina, U.S.	
154	Win	126–19–7 (2)	Jimmy Young	KO	8 (10)	Aug 27, 1941	Newfield Park, Bridgeport, Connecticut, U.S.	
153	Win	125–19–7 (2)	Jimmy Marmon	KO	3 (10)	Aug 18, 1941	Municipal Auditorium, Augusta, Georgia, U.S.	
152	Win	124–19–7 (2)	Ezzard Charles	UD	10	Jun 9, 1941	Crosley Field, Cincinnati, Ohio, U.S.	
151	Loss	123–19–7 (2)	Billy Soose	UD	15	Mar 9, 1941	Madison Square Garden, New York City, New York, U.S.	Lost NYSAC middleweight title
150	Win	123–18–7 (2)	Larry Kellum	UD	10	Mar 31, 1941	Maple Grove Field House, Lancaster, Pennsylvania, U.S.	
149	Win	122–18–7 (2)	Larry Kellum	TKO	4 (10)	Mar 27, 1941	Memorial Auditorium, Barre, Vermont, U.S.	
148	Win	121–18–7 (2)	Mose Brown	UD	10	Mar 10, 1941	Duquesne Gardens, Pittsburgh, Pennsylvania, U.S.	
147	Draw	120–18–7 (2)	Paulie Walker	PTS	10	Feb 10, 1941	Arena, Trenton, New Jersey, U.S.	
146	Win	120–18–6 (2)	Jack Munley	UD	10	Feb 3, 1941	Lyric Theatre, Allentown, Pennsylvania, U.S.	
145	Win	119–18–6 (2)	Tony Cisco	UD	10	Jan 21, 1941	Turner's Arena, Washington, D.C., U.S.	
144	Win	118–18–6 (2)	Steve Belloise	SD	15	Dec 13, 1940	Madison Square Garden, New York City, New York, U.S.	Retained NYSAC middleweight title
143	Win	117–18–6 (2)	Steve Belloise	MD	15	Nov 1, 1940	Madison Square Garden, New York City, New York, U.S.	Retained NYSAC middleweight title
142	Win	116–18–6 (2)	Larry Lane	PTS	10	Sep 30, 1940	Arena, Trenton, New Jersey, U.S.	
141	Win	115–18–6 (2)	Ernest Peirce	PTS	10	Sep 18, 1940	Municipal Auditorium, Norfolk, Virginia, U.S.	
140	Win	114–18–6 (2)	Ben Brown	PTS	12	Aug 8, 1940	Ponce de Leon Ballpark, Atlanta, Georgia, U.S.	
139	Loss	113–18–6 (2)	Billy Soose	SD	10	Jul 24, 1940	Scranton Stadium, Scranton, Pennsylvania, U.S.	
138	Win	113–17–6 (2)	Harry Balsamo	TKO	9 (10)	Jul 9, 1940	Queensboro Arena, Long Island City, Queens, New York City, New York, U.S.	
137	Win	112–17–6 (2)	Ben Brown	PTS	10	Jun 28, 1940	City Stadium, Richmond, Virginia, U.S.	
136	Win	111–17–6 (2)	Ralph DeJohn	PTS	10	Jun 13, 1940	State Fair Coliseum, Syracuse, New York City, New York, U.S.	
135	Win	110–17–6 (2)	Ceferino Garcia	UD	15	May 23, 1940	Madison Square Garden, New York City, New York, U.S.	Won NYSAC middleweight title
134	Win	109–17–6 (2)	Steve Wilkerson	KO	9 (10)	Apr 25, 1940	Auditorium, Memphis, Tennessee, U.S.	
133	Win	108–17–6 (2)	Frankie Nelson	PTS	10	Apr 15, 1940	Exposition Building, Portland, Oregon, U.S.	
132	Win	107–17–6 (2)	Jerry Maloni	UD	10	Mar 28, 1940	Polish National Home, Chicopee, Massachusetts, U.S.	
131	Win	106–17–6 (2)	Butch Lynch	KO	8 (10)	Mar 15, 1940	State Armory, Cumberland, Maryland, U.S.	
130	Win	105–17–6 (2)	Enzo Iannozzi	PTS	10	Feb 21, 1940	Auditorium, Raleigh, North Carolina, U.S.	
129	Draw	104–17–6 (2)	Ben Brown	PTS	10	Dec 11, 1939	City Auditorium, Atlanta, Georgia, U.S.	
128	Win	104–17–5 (2)	Babe Orgovan	PTS	10	Dec 4, 1939	Turner's Arena, Washington, D.C., U.S.	
127	Win	103–17–5 (2)	Ben Brown	PTS	10	Nov 27, 1939	Miami Field, Miami, Florida, U.S.	
126	Win	102–17–5 (2)	Honeyboy Jones	UD	10	Nov 21, 1939	Municipal Auditorium, Saint Louis, Missouri, U.S.	
125	Draw	101–17–5 (2)	Ben Brown	PTS	10	Oct 23, 1939	Warren Arena, Atlanta, Georgia, U.S.	
124	Win	101–17–4 (2)	Allen Matthews	UD	10	Oct 18, 1939	Municipal Auditorium, Saint Louis, Missouri, U.S.	
123	Win	100–17–4 (2)	Al Wardlow	UD	10	Aug 28, 1939	Forbes Field, Pittsburgh, Pennsylvania, U.S.	
122	Draw	99–17–4 (2)	Ernest Peirce	PTS	10	Jul 7, 1939	Atlantic Stadium, Long Branch, New Jersey, U.S.	
121	Win	99–17–3 (2)	Honeyboy Jones	PTS	10	Jun 26, 1939	Hickey Park, Millvale, Pennsylvania, U.S.	
120	Win	98–17–3 (2)	Eric Seelig	PTS	10	Jun 8, 1939	Chicago Stadium, Chicago, Illinois, U.S.	
119	Win	97–17–3 (2)	Harvey Massey	PTS	10	May 18, 1939	Coliseum, Baltimore, Maryland, U.S.	
118	Win	96–17–3 (2)	Jimmy Webb	PTS	10	May 2, 1939	Olympiad Arena, Houston, Texas, U.S.	
117	Win	95–17–3 (2)	Jack Riley	KO	2 (10)	Apr 17, 1939	Open-Air Arena, Houston, Texas, U.S.	
116	Loss	94–17–3 (2)	Teddy Yarosz	PTS	10	Feb 27, 1939	Olympiad Arena, Houston, Texas, U.S.	
115	Win	94–16–3 (2)	Al Bernard	UD	10	Feb 14, 1939	Olympiad Arena, Houston, Texas, U.S.	
114	Win	93–16–3 (2)	Al Quaill	PTS	10	Feb 6, 1939	Marigold Gardens, Chicago, Illinois, U.S.	
113	Win	92–16–3 (2)	Billy Celebron	PTS	10	Jan 16, 1939	Marigold Gardens, Chicago, Illinois, U.S.	
112	Loss	91–16–3 (2)	Eric Seelig	UD	10	Dec 20, 1938	New York Coliseum, Bronx, New York City, New York, U.S.	
111	Win	91–15–3 (2)	Jack Moran	PTS	10	Dec 17, 1938	Armory, Akron, Ohio, U.S.	
110	Win	90–15–3 (2)	Nate Bolden	UD	10	Dec 2, 1938	White City Arena, Chicago, Illinois, U.S.	
109	Win	89–15–3 (2)	Milton Shivers	UD	10	Nov 16, 1938	Park Casino, Chicago, Illinois, U.S.	
108	Win	88–15–3 (2)	Nate Bolden	UD	10	Nov 4, 1938	White City Arena, Chicago, Illinois, U.S.	
107	Win	87–15–3 (2)	Jack Moran	KO	6 (10)	Oct 17, 1938	Peoria, Illinois, U.S.	
106	Win	86–15–3 (2)	Jimmy Clark	TKO	4 (10)	Oct 7, 1938	White City Arena, Chicago, Illinois, U.S.	
105	Win	85–15–3 (2)	Billy Celebron	PTS	10	Sep 19, 1938	Marigold Gardens Outdoor Arena, Chicago, Illinois, U.S.	
104	Loss	84–15–3 (2)	Lloyd Marshall	PTS	10	Sep 1, 1938	Civic Auditorium, San Francisco, California, U.S.	
103	NC	84–14–3 (2)	Atilio Sabatino	NC	7 (12)	Jul 15, 1938	West Melbourne Stadium, Melbourne, Victoria, Australia	
102	Draw	84–14–3 (1)	Atilio Sabatino	PTS	12	Jun 23, 1938	Sydney Stadium, Sydney, New South Wales, Australia	
101	Loss	84–14–2 (1)	Fred Henneberry	PTS	12	May 30, 1938	Sydney Stadium, Sydney, New South Wales, Australia	
100	Win	84–13–2 (1)	Dick Foster	UD	10	Mar 16, 1938	Civic Auditorium, San Francisco, California, U.S.	
99	Loss	83–13–2 (1)	Walter Woods	UD	10	Jan 26, 1938	Hippodrome, New York City, New York, U.S.	
98	Win	83–12–2 (1)	Jack Moran	PTS	6	Dec 6, 1937	Arena, Cleveland, Ohio, U.S.	
97	Win	82–12–2 (1)	Bobby Birch	PTS	8	Nov 15, 1937	Odd Fellows' Hall, Albany, New York, U.S.	
96	Win	81–12–2 (1)	Butch Lynch	KO	7 (8)	Oct 25, 1937	Odd Fellows' Hall, Albany, New York, U.S.	
95	Win	80–12–2 (1)	Tiger Roy Williams	TKO	4 (10)	Oct 18, 1937	Westchester County Center, White Plains, New York, U.S.	
94	Loss	79–12–2 (1)	Freddie Steele	KO	4 (15)	Sep 11, 1937	Civic Auditorium, Seattle, Washington, U.S.	For NBA and NYSAC middleweight titles
93	Win	79–11–2 (1)	Young Stuhley	PTS	10	Jul 30, 1937	Legion Stadium, Hollywood, California, U.S.	
92	Win	78–11–2 (1)	John Zawackie	KO	2 (10)	Feb 15, 1937	Armory, Newport News, Virginia, U.S.	
91	Win	77–11–2 (1)	Fred Apostoli	MD	10	Jan 27, 1937	Hippodrome, New York City, New York, U.S.	
90	Loss	76–11–2 (1)	Kid Tunero	PTS	10	Dec 21, 1936	Palais des Sports, Paris, Paris, France	
89	Win	76–10–2 (1)	Ben Brown	PTS	10	Nov 23, 1936	City Auditorium, Richmond, Virginia, U.S.	
88	Loss	75–10–2 (1)	Teddy Yarosz	UD	10	Nov 4, 1936	Motor Square Garden, Pittsburgh, Pennsylvania, U.S.	
87	Win	75–9–2 (1)	Ralph Chong	PTS	10	Oct 12, 1936	Municipal Auditorium, Norfolk, Virginia, U.S.	
86	Win	74–9–2 (1)	Oscar Rankins	MD	10	Aug 31, 1936	Hickey Park, Millvale, Pennsylvania, U.S.	
85	Win	73–9–2 (1)	Al Quaill	PTS	10	Aug 20, 1936	Johnstown, Pennsylvania, U.S.	
84	Win	72–9–2 (1)	Billy Hood	KO	3 (10)	Jul 20, 1936	Carolina Arena, Asheville, North Carolina, U.S.	
83	Win	71–9–2 (1)	George Black	PTS	10	Jul 1, 1936	Auditorium, Milwaukee, Wisconsin, U.S.	
82	Win	70–9–2 (1)	Jackie Aldare	PTS	10	Jun 22, 1936	Mayo Island, Richmond, Virginia, U.S.	
81	Win	69–9–2 (1)	Jimmy Jones	PTS	10	Jun 17, 1936	Oriole Park, Baltimore, Maryland, U.S.	
80	Win	68–9–2 (1)	Ralph Chong	UD	10	Apr 27, 1936	Turner's Arena, Washington, D.C., U.S.	
79	Win	67–9–2 (1)	Jack Ennis	PTS	10	Apr 20, 1936	City Auditorium, Richmond, Maryland, U.S.	
78	Win	66–9–2 (1)	Ralph Chong	PTS	10	Mar 30, 1936	Carlin's Park, Baltimore, Maryland, U.S.	
77	Win	65–9–2 (1)	Johnny Rossi	PTS	10	Mar 20, 1936	Boston Garden, Boston, Massachusetts, U.S.	
76	Win	64–9–2 (1)	Tony Fisher	PTS	10	Mar 2, 1936	Northside Arena, Pittsburgh, Pennsylvania, U.S.	
75	Win	63–9–2 (1)	Roxie Allen	KO	2 (10)	Feb 21, 1936	Palace Theater, Baltimore, Maryland, U.S.	
74	Win	62–9–2 (1)	Mickey Bottone	KO	4 (10)	Feb 10, 1936	City Auditorium, Richmond, Virginia, U.S.	
73	Win	61–9–2 (1)	Tony Brescia	UD	10	Dec 19, 1935	City Auditorium, Richmond, Virginia, U.S.	
72	Win	60–9–2 (1)	Al Quaill	MD	11	Dec 9, 1935	Northside Arena, Pittsburgh, Pennsylvania, U.S.	
71	Win	59–9–2 (1)	Carmen Barth	PTS	10	Nov 25, 1935	City Auditorium, Richmond, Virginia, U.S.	
70	Win	58–9–2 (1)	Mookie Goldman	PTS	10	Nov 18, 1935	Municipal Auditorium, Norfolk, Virginia, U.S.	
69	Win	57–9–2 (1)	Al Quaill	MD	10	Oct 14, 1935	Motor Square Garden, Pittsburgh, Pennsylvania, U.S.	
68	Win	56–9–2 (1)	George Black	PTS	8	Oct 4, 1935	Chicago Stadium, Chicago, Illinois, U.S.	
67	Win	55–9–2 (1)	Anson Green	UD	8	Sep 19, 1935	Forbes Field, Pittsburgh, Pennsylvania, U.S.	
66	Win	54–9–2 (1)	Tommy Romano	PTS	10	Aug 26, 1935	Virginia Sports Corp., Richmond, Virginia, U.S.	
65	Win	53–9–2 (1)	Joe Smallwood	PTS	10	Aug 19, 1935	Griffith Stadium, Washington, D.C., U.S.	
64	Win	52–9–2 (1)	Henry Firpo	PTS	10	Aug 9, 1935	Convention Hall, Atlantic City, New Jersey, U.S.	
63	Win	51–9–2 (1)	Johnny Duca	TKO	4 (8)	Jul 29, 1935	Virginia Sports Corp., Richmond, Virginia, U.S.	
62	Win	50–9–2 (1)	Charley Weise	PTS	8	Feb 6, 1935	Municipal Auditorium, Norfolk, Virginia, U.S.	
61	Win	49–9–2 (1)	Danny Hassett	PTS	10	Oct 15, 1934	Arena, Philadelphia, Pennsylvania, U.S.	
60	Win	48–9–2 (1)	Al Diamond	PTS	10	Oct 5, 1934	Cambria A.C., Philadelphia, Pennsylvania, U.S.	
59	Win	47–9–2 (1)	Pat Flaherty	KO	6 (8)	Sep 21, 1934	Municipal Auditorium, Norfolk, Virginia, U.S.	
58	Win	46–9–2 (1)	Frankie Remus	KO	7 (10)	Sep 8, 1934	Municipal Auditorium, Norfolk, Virginia, U.S.	
57	Win	45–9–2 (1)	Henry Irving	TKO	7 (10)	Aug 22, 1934	Virginia Sports Corp., Richmond, Virginia, U.S.	
56	Loss	44–9–2 (1)	Jimmy Smith	PTS	10	Jun 20, 1934	Cambria Stadium, Philadelphia, Pennsylvania, U.S.	
55	Win	44–8–2 (1)	Paul Pirrone	PTS	10	Jun 4, 1934	Bain Field, Norfolk, Virginia, U.S.	
54	Loss	43–8–2 (1)	Paul Pirrone	UD	10	Apr 30, 1934	Convention Hall, Philadelphia, Pennsylvania, U.S.	
53	Win	43–7–2 (1)	Tommy Rios	PTS	10	Apr 20, 1934	Cambria A.C., Philadelphia, Pennsylvania, U.S.	
52	Win	42–7–2 (1)	Billy Ketchell	PTS	10	Apr 6, 1934	Cambria A.C., Philadelphia, Pennsylvania, U.S.	
51	Win	41–7–2 (1)	Danny Hassett	SD	10	Mar 16, 1934	Cambria A.C., Philadelphia, Pennsylvania, U.S.	
50	Win	40–7–2 (1)	Roxie Allen	PTS	8	Mar 6, 1934	Portner's Arena, Alexandria, Virginia, U.S.	
49	Win	39–7–2 (1)	Joe Kaminski	UD	10	Mar 2, 1934	Cambria A.C., Philadelphia, Pennsylvania, U.S.	
48	Win	38–7–2 (1)	Andy DiVodi	PTS	8	Feb 2, 1934	Virginia Athletic Club, Norfolk, Virginia, U.S.	
47	Win	37–7–2 (1)	Weiner Wilch	PTS	10	Jan 26, 1934	Cambria A.C., Philadelphia, Pennsylvania, U.S.	
46	Win	36–7–2 (1)	Red Burman	PTS	8	Jan 2, 1934	Portner's Arena, Alexandria, Virginia, U.S.	
45	Win	35–7–2 (1)	Tommy Rios	PTS	8	Dec 29, 1933	Virginia Athletic Club, Norfolk, Virginia, U.S.	
44	Win	34–7–2 (1)	Rudy Marshall	PTS	10	Dec 8, 1933	106th Infantry Regiment Armory, Brooklyn, New York City, New York, U.S.	Won New York State National Guard middleweight title
43	Win	33–7–2 (1)	Tommy Rios	PTS	8	Nov 15, 1933	Virginia Athletic Club, Norfolk, Virginia, U.S.	
42	Win	32–7–2 (1)	Johnny Bates	PTS	8	Nov 10, 1933	106th Infantry Regiment Armory, Brooklyn, New York City, New York, U.S.	
41	Win	31–7–2 (1)	Art Sykes	KO	5 (8)	Sep 6, 1933	Virginia Athletic Club, Norfolk, Virginia, U.S.	
40	Win	30–7–2 (1)	Roy Bailey	PTS	10	Aug 14, 1933	Sullivan's Bowl, Charleston, South Carolina, U.S.	
39	Win	29–7–2 (1)	Billy Strickler	PTS	8	Aug 7, 1933	Rosecroft Raceway, Fort Washington, Maryland, U.S.	
38	Win	28–7–2 (1)	Joe Lipps	PTS	8	Jul 19, 1933	Arena, Virginia Beach, Virginia, U.S.	
37	Win	27–7–2 (1)	Billy Shell	PTS	10	Jun 19, 1933	Sullivan's Bowl, Charleston, South Carolina, U.S.	
36	Win	26–7–2 (1)	Henry Irving	UD	8	May 23, 1933	Portner's Arena, Alexandria, Virginia, U.S.	
35	Win	25–7–2 (1)	Johnny Vermillion	PTS	4	May 17, 1933	Virginia Athletic Club, Norfolk, Virginia, U.S.	
34	Win	24–7–2 (1)	Walter Kirkwood	PTS	6	May 16, 1933	Portner's Arena, Alexandria, Virginia, U.S.	
33	Win	23–7–2 (1)	Johnny Mays	PTS	6	May 3, 1933	Municipal Auditorium, Norfolk, Virginia, U.S.	
32	Win	22–7–2 (1)	Joe Finazzo	KO	3 (6)	Apr 25, 1933	Portner's Arena, Alexandria, Virginia, U.S.	
31	Win	21–7–2 (1)	Walter Kirkwood	PTS	4	Apr 12, 1933	Municipal Auditorium, Norfolk, Virginia, U.S.	
30	Win	20–7–2 (1)	Billy Brennan	PTS	4	Jan 24, 1933	Oasis, Portsmouth, Virginia, U.S.	
29	Win	19–7–2 (1)	Red Journee	PTS	8	Dec 9, 1932	Oasis, Portsmouth, Virginia, U.S.	
28	Loss	18–7–2 (1)	Red Journee	PTS	8	Dec 2, 1932	Oasis, Portsmouth, Virginia, U.S.	
27	Draw	18–6–2 (1)	Bob Turner	PTS	8	Sep 19, 1932	Armory, Newport News, Virginia, U.S.	
26	Loss	18–6–1 (1)	Vince Dundee	PTS	10	Aug 10, 1932	Arena, Virginia Beach, Virginia, U.S.	
25	Win	18–5–1 (1)	Walter Kirkwood	PTS	8	Jul 21, 1932	Arena, Virginia Beach, Virginia, U.S.	
24	Win	17–5–1 (1)	Spike Webb	PTS	8	Jun 8, 1932	Arena, Virginia Beach, Virginia, U.S.	
23	Loss	16–5–1 (1)	Sylvan Bass	PTS	8	Jun 6, 1932	Portner's Arena, Alexandria, Virginia, U.S.	
22	Win	16–4–1 (1)	Joe Smallwood	PTS	8	May 9, 1932	Portner's Arena, Alexandria, Virginia, U.S.	
21	Win	15–4–1 (1)	Tony D'Alessandro	PTS	8	Apr 12, 1932	Portner's Arena, Alexandria, Virginia, U.S.	
20	Win	14–4–1 (1)	Joey Raymond	PTS	8	Mar 25, 1932	Oasis, Portsmouth, Virginia, U.S.	
19	Win	13–4–1 (1)	Eric Lawson	PTS	8	Mar 11, 1932	Oasis, Portsmouth, Virginia, U.S.	
18	Loss	12–4–1 (1)	Al Trainor	PTS	8	Jan 15, 1932	Oasis, Portsmouth, Virginia, U.S.	
17	Win	12–3–1 (1)	Bob Turner	PTS	8	Jan 1, 1932	First Street Arena, Portsmouth, Virginia, U.S.	
16	Win	11–3–1 (1)	Eric Lawson	PTS	8	Dec 11, 1931	Oasis, Portsmouth, Virginia, U.S.	
15	Win	10–3–1 (1)	Red Journee	PTS	8	Nov 27, 1931	Oasis, Portsmouth, Virginia, U.S.	
14	NC	9–3–1 (1)	Sailor Jack Potter	NC	1 (8)	Nov 18, 1931	Twin City Arena, Portsmouth, Virginia, U.S.	Fight was called off when it was learned that Overlin and Potter were shipmates on the U.S. Idaho
13	Win	9–3–1	Red Hickman	PTS	8	Nov 9, 1931	Twin City Arena, Portsmouth, Virginia, U.S.	
12	Win	8–3–1	Johnny Skrinan	PTS	8	Oct 30, 1931	Oasis, Portsmouth, Virginia, U.S.	
11	Win	7–3–1	Billy Brennan	PTS	6	Oct 16, 1931	Oasis, Portsmouth, Virginia, U.S.	
10	Win	6–3–1	Ted Beales	PTS	4	Jul 23, 1931	Port Angeles, Oregon, U.S.	
9	Win	5–3–1	Mickey Balabon	PTS	4	Jun 30, 1931	Olympic Auditorium, Los Angeles, Washington, U.S.	
8	Win	4–3–1	Jack McKnight	PTS	6	Jun 10, 1931	Wilmington Bowl, Wilmington, Washington, U.S.	
7	Win	3–3–1	Harry Hansen	TKO	5 (6)	May 27, 1931	Wilmington Bowl, Wilmington, Washington, U.S.	
6	Win	2–3–1	Tolly Dolan	PTS	6	Mar 13, 1931	Charleston Legion Hall, West Bremerton, Washington, U.S.	
5	Loss	1–3–1	Neil Kilbane	PTS	6	Mar 12, 1931	Greenwich Coliseum, Tacoma, Washington, U.S.	
4	Win	1–2–1	Neil Kilbane	PTS	4	Feb 26, 1931	Greenwich Coliseum, Tacoma, Washington, U.S.	
3	Loss	0–2–1	Jack Hanley	KO	6 (6)	Feb 12, 1931	Arena, White Center, Washington, U.S.	
2	Loss	0–1–1	Paul Delaney	PTS	6	Jan 28, 1931	Crystal Pool, Seattle, Washington, U.S.	
1	Draw	0–0–1	Paul Delaney	PTS	4	Jan 21, 1931	Crystal Pool, Seattle, Washington, U.S.	

Awards and achievements
Preceded by Ceferino Garcia	NYSAC World Middleweight Champion; May 23, 1940 – May 9, 1941	Succeeded by Billy Soose
