= Coley Welch =

American boxer

Personal information
- Nickname: Fighting Iceman
- Born: February 8, 1919 (age 107) Portland, Maine, U.S.
- Died: December 4, 2000 (aged 81) Las Vegas, Nevada, U.S.
- Height: 5 ft 7 in (170 cm)
- Weight: Middleweight

Boxing career
- Stance: Orthodox

Boxing record
- Total fights: 141
- Wins: 109
- Win by KO: 51
- Losses: 26
- Draws: 6

Coleman Patrick Welch (February 8, 1919 – December 4, 2000) was an American middleweight boxer. Born in Portland, Maine, Welch came from an Irish-American community and was nicked the Fighting Iceman. He made his amateur debut on May 21, 1936 at the age of 17 and fought primarily at the Portland Exposition Building during his early years. In 1941, The Ring magazine ranked him #3 among middleweights. He was a member of the U.S. Coast Guard during World War II and returned to boxing in 1943. On St. Patrick's Day (March 17), 1944, Welch fought Jake LaMotta in front of 10,000 fans at the Boston Garden. The fight ended with a unanimous decision in LaMotta's favor. His final match was on April 5, 1949. He ended his career with a 109-26-6 record over 141 matches.

He died in Las Vegas, where he had worked as a casino security guard following his retirement from boxing.
