= Harold Johnson (boxer) =

American boxer (1928–2015)

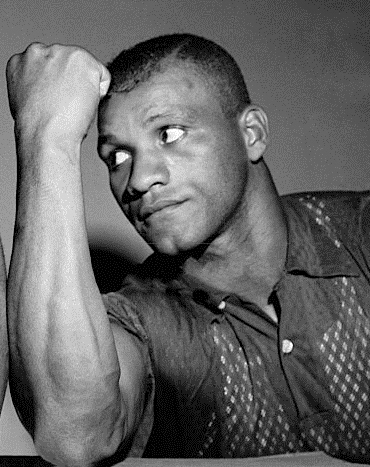
- Johnson in 1954

Personal information
- Nickname: Hercules
- Nationality: American
- Born: August 9, 1928 Manayunk, Pennsylvania, U.S.
- Died: February 19, 2015 (aged 86) Philadelphia, Pennsylvania, U.S.
- Height: 5 ft 10 in (1.78 m)
- Weight: Light Heavyweight; Middleweight

Boxing career
- Reach: 74 in (188 cm)
- Stance: Orthodox

Boxing record
- Total fights: 88
- Wins: 76
- Win by KO: 32
- Losses: 11
- No contests: 1

Harold Johnson (August 9, 1928 – February 19, 2015) was an American professional boxer. He held the NYSAC, NBA/WBA, and The Ring light heavyweight titles from 1962 to 1963.

== Boxing career ==
Johnson was born in Manayunk, Philadelphia. He started boxing while serving in the United States Navy and turned professional in 1946. He won his first twenty-four fights before losing a ten-round decision to Archie Moore in 1949. Moore would be Johnson's biggest career rival. Johnson rebounded with four straight victories, including a ten-round decision win against future Hall of Fame inductee Jimmy Bivins.

Johnson's father, Phil Johnson, was also a professional boxer. Phil and Harold Johnson became the first father/son combination to not only fight the same fighter, but lose to him as well. Both suffered third-round knockout defeats at the hands of future World Heavyweight Champion Jersey Joe Walcott in 1936 and 1950, respectively. Harold lost after suffering an injury to the intervertebral disc in the small of his back.

After five consecutive wins, Johnson resumed his rivalry with Archie Moore, fighting Moore three times in a row between September 1951 and January 1954. All three went the ten-round distance. Johnson lost the rematch, won the rubber match and lost the fourth bout.

In 1952, Johnson split two fights with Bob Satterfield, losing the first by decision and winning the second by knockout, and won a decision over heavyweight contender Nino Valdez. The following year, he defeated former World Heavyweight Champion Ezzard Charles by a split decision. Johnson would finally get a title shot eight years into his career in his fifth and final fight against Archie Moore in 1954. Moore was making the third defense of the World Light Heavyweight Championship. In an exciting fight, Johnson knocked Moore down in the 10th round and was ahead on the scorecards after 13 rounds. But Moore rallied, knocking Johnson down and stopping him in the 14th round.

Johnson outpointed Julio Mederos over ten rounds in 1954. The following year, they had a rematch in Philadelphia. Johnson collapsed after the second round and was carried from the ring on a stretcher. Tests later revealed that Johnson had been drugged with a barbiturate. As a result, the Governor of Pennsylvania suspended boxing in the state for 114 days and instructed the Pennsylvania Athletic Commission to launch a probe. Johnson said he started feeling ill in his dressing room after eating an orange that had been given to him by a stranger who said he was a long-time admirer. A chemical analysis of a piece of the orange showed no trace of a drug or barbiturate. The probe never did uncover who drugged Johnson or how the drug was administered. However, the commission ruled that Johnson knew he was not in condition to fight and should've reported that fact to commission officials on duty that night. He was suspended for six months and his purse was forfeited.

When the National Boxing Association (NBA) withdrew recognition of Archie Moore as World Light Heavyweight Champion for failure to defend, Johnson defeated Jesse Bowdry in 1961 by a ninth-round technical knockout to capture the vacant NBA title. In his first title defense, Johnson stopped Von Clay in two rounds. After defeating second-ranked heavyweight contender Eddie Machen by a ten-round decision in a non-title bout, Johnson successfully defended his title for a second time with a split decision victory over 4th-ranked light heavyweight contender Eddie Cotton.

Johnson gained universal recognition as World Light Heavyweight Champion when he defeated Doug Jones in 1962 by a decision in fifteen rounds. He successfully defended the undisputed title once, outpointing Gustav Scholz in Berlin, then lost it to Willie Pastrano by a fifteen-round split decision in 1963. Johnson would never fight for a title again and retired in 1971 with a record of 76–11 with 32 knockouts.

Johnson was inducted into the World Boxing Hall of Fame in 1992 and the International Boxing Hall of Fame in 1993.

Johnson was named the 7th greatest light heavyweight of the 20th century by the Associated Press in 1999. Three years later, The Ring magazine ranked Johnson 7th on the list "The 20 Greatest Light Heavyweight of All-Time" and 80th on the list "The 80 Best Fighters of the Last 80 Years." Johnson died at the age of 86 on February 19, 2015.

== Professional boxing record ==
87 fights	76 wins	11 losses
By knockout	31	5
By decision	45	6

No.	Result	Record	Opponent	Type	Round	Date	Location	Notes
87	Loss	76–11	Herschel Jacobs	TKO	3 (10)	Mar 30, 1971	Sunnyside Gardens, Queens, New York City, New York, U.S.	
86	Win	76–10	Johnny Alford	UD	10	Jun 11, 1968	Miami Beach Convention Hall, Miami Beach, Florida, U.S.	
85	Win	75–10	Lothar Stengel	PTS	10	Feb 3, 1968	Festhalle Frankfurt, Frankfurt, Hesse, Germany	
84	Win	74–10	Eddie Jones	PTS	10	Aug 7, 1967	Silver Slipper, Las Vegas, Nevada, U.S.	
83	Win	73–10	Herschel Jacobs	UD	10	May 1, 1967	New Orleans Municipal Auditorium, New Orleans, Louisiana, U.S.	
82	Win	72–10	Pekka Kokkonen	PTS	10	Dec 6, 1966	Wiener Stadthalle, Vienna, Austria	
81	Loss	71–10	Johnny Persol	UD	10	Jan 7, 1966	Madison Square Garden, New York City, New York, U.S.	
80	Win	71–9	Hank Casey	KO	8 (10)	Apr 20, 1964	Santa Monica Civic Auditorium, Santa Monica, California, U.S.	
79	Win	70–9	Henry Hank	UD	10	Dec 6, 1963	The Blue Horizon, Philadelphia, Pennsylvania, U.S.	
78	Loss	69–9	Willie Pastrano	SD	15	Jun 1, 1963	Las Vegas Convention Center, Las Vegas, Nevada, U.S.	Lost WBA, WBC, and The Ring light heavyweight titles
77	Win	69–8	Tommy Merrill	TKO	9 (10)	Mar 19, 1963	Catholic Youth Center, Scranton, Pennsylvania, U.S.	
76	Win	68–8	Gustav Scholz	UD	15	Jun 23, 1962	Olympiastadion, Westend, Berlin, Germany	Retained NYSAC, NBA, and The Ring light heavyweight titles
75	Win	67–8	Doug Jones	UD	15	May 12, 1962	Philadelphia Arena, Philadelphia, Pennsylvania, U.S.	Retained NBA light heavyweight title; Won vacant NYSAC and The Ring light heavyweight titles
74	Win	66–8	Eddie Cotton	SD	15	Aug 29, 1961	Sick's Stadium, Seattle, Washington, U.S.	Retained NBA light heavyweight title
73	Win	65–8	Eddie Machen	PTS	10	Jul 1, 1961	Boardwalk Hall, Atlantic City, New Jersey, U.S.	
72	Win	64–8	Von Clay	TKO	2 (15)	Apr 24, 1961	Philadelphia Arena, Philadelphia, Pennsylvania, U.S.	Retained NBA light heavyweight title
71	Win	63–8	Jesse Bowdry	TKO	9 (15)	Feb 7, 1961	Miami Beach Convention Hall, Miami Beach, Florida, U.S.	Won vacant NBA light heavyweight title
70	Win	62–8	Clarence Floyd	UD	10	May 4, 1960	Philadelphia Convention Center, Philadelphia, Pennsylvania	
69	Win	61–8	Sonny Ray	TKO	10 (10)	Nov 11, 1959	Chicago Stadium, Chicago, Illinois, U.S.	
68	Win	60–8	Johnny York	TKO	6 (10)	Aug 4, 1959	Wahconah Park, Pittsfield, Massachusetts, U.S.	
67	Win	59–8	Rudy Watkins	KO	6 (10)	Dec 15, 1958	Cambria A.C., Philadelphia, Pennsylvania, U.S.	
66	Win	58–8	Howard King	UD	10	Dec 3, 1958	Chicago Stadium, Chicago, Illinois, U.S.	
65	Win	57–8	Ollie Wilson	TKO	2 (10)	Apr 15, 1958	Foot Guard Hall, Hartford, Connecticut, U.S.	
64	Win	56–8	Bert Whitehurst	UD	10	Jan 17, 1958	Syracuse War Memorial Arena, Syracuse, New York City, New York, U.S.	
63	Win	55–8	Sid Peaks	KO	5 (10)	Dec 17, 1957	Toledo, Ohio, U.S.	
62	Win	54–8	Wayne Bethea	UD	10	Sep 10, 1957	Philadelphia Convention Center, Philadelphia, Pennsylvania, U.S.	
61	Win	53–8	Clarence Hinnant	KO	1 (10)	May 31, 1957	St. Nicholas Arena, New York City, New York, U.S.	
60	Win	52–8	Bob Satterfield	UD	10	Mar 12, 1957	Miami Beach Auditorium, Miami Beach, Florida, U.S.	
59	Win	51–8	Bert Whitehurst	PTS	10	Dec 8, 1956	Portland Exposition Building, Portland, Maine, U.S.	
58	Loss	50–8	Julio Mederos	TKO	2 (10)	May 6, 1955	Philadelphia Arena, Philadelphia, Pennsylvania, U.S.	Tests revealed that Johnson had been drugged. Some sources list this bout as a no contest
57	Win	50–7	Paul Andrews	KO	6 (10)	Feb 11, 1955	Madison Square Garden, New York City, New York, U.S.	
56	Win	49–7	Marty Marshall	UD	10	Dec 22, 1954	Detroit Olympia, Detroit, Michigan, U.S.	
55	Win	48–7	Julio Mederos	UD	10	Dec 7, 1954	Miami Beach Auditorium, Miami Beach, Florida, U.S.	
54	Loss	47–7	Oakland Billy Smith	KO	2 (10)	Oct 8, 1954	Philadelphia Arena, Philadelphia, Pennsylvania, U.S.	
53	Loss	47–6	Archie Moore	TKO	14 (15)	Aug 11, 1954	Madison Square Garden, New York City, New York, U.S.	For NYSAC, NBA, and The Ring light heavyweight titles
52	Win	47–5	Paul Andrews	MD	10	Mar 17, 1954	Chicago Stadium, Chicago, Illinois, U.S.	
51	Win	46–5	Charley Doc Williams	TKO	8 (10)	Feb 15, 1954	Miami Beach Auditorium, Miami Beach, Florida, U.S.	
50	Win	45–5	Jimmy Slade	SD	10	Jan 29, 1954	St. Nicholas Arena, New York City, New York, U.S.	
49	Win	44–5	Chubby Wright	UD	10	Nov 19, 1953	Hershey Sports Arena, Hershey, Pennsylvania	
48	Win	43–5	Henry Hall	UD	10	Nov 7, 1953	Milwaukee Auditorium, Milwaukee, Wisconsin, U.S.	
47	Win	42–5	Ezzard Charles	SD	10	Sep 8, 1953	Shibe Park, Philadelphia, Pennsylvania, U.S.	
46	Win	41–5	Toxie Hall	UD	10	May 11, 1953	Dinner Key, Miami, Florida, U.S.	
45	Win	40–5	Billy Gilliam	UD	10	Mar 21, 1953	Toledo Sports Arena, Toledo, Ohio, U.S.	
44	Win	39–5	Jimmy Slade	UD	10	Jan 16, 1953	St. Nicholas Arena, New York City, New York, U.S.	
43	Win	38–5	Niño Valdés	UD	10	Nov 24, 1952	Boxing From Eastern Parkway, Brooklyn, New York City, New York, U.S.	
42	Win	37–5	Bob Satterfield	KO	2 (10)	Oct 6, 1952	Philadelphia Arena, Philadelphia, Pennsylvania, U.S.	
41	Win	36–5	Leonard Morrow	KO	3 (10)	Sep 16, 1952	Arena, Toledo, Ohio, U.S.	
40	Loss	35–5	Bob Satterfield	SD	10	Aug 6, 1952	Chicago Stadium, Chicago, Illinois, U.S.	
39	Win	35–4	Clarence Henry	SD	10	Mar 17, 1952	Philadelphia Arena, Philadelphia, Pennsylvania, U.S.	
38	Loss	34–4	Archie Moore	UD	10	Jan 29, 1952	Toledo Sports Arena, Toledo, Ohio, U.S.	
37	Win	34–3	Archie Moore	UD	10	Dec 10, 1951	Arena, Milwaukee, Wisconsin, U.S.	
36	Loss	33–3	Archie Moore	UD	10	Sep 24, 1951	Philadelphia Arena, Philadelphia, Pennsylvania, U.S.	
35	Win	33–2	Chubby Wright	UD	10	Jul 23, 1951	Toppi Stadium, Philadelphia, Pennsylvania, U.S.	
34	Win	32–2	Elkins Brothers	TKO	10 (10)	Jun 18, 1951	Toppi Stadium, Philadelphia, Pennsylvania, U.S.	
33	Win	31–2	Chuck Hunter	PTS	8	Feb 9, 1951	Madison Square Garden, New York City, New York, U.S.	
32	Win	30–2	Dusty Wilkerson	KO	4 (10)	Jan 22, 1951	Philadelphia Arena, Philadelphia, Pennsylvania, U.S.	
31	Win	29–2	Harry Daniels	KO	2 (10)	Dec 18, 1950	Philadelphia Arena, Philadelphia, Pennsylvania, U.S.	
30	Loss	28–2	Jersey Joe Walcott	KO	3 (10)	Feb 8, 1950	Philadelphia Arena, Philadelphia, Pennsylvania, U.S.	
29	Win	28–1	Bert Lytell	PTS	10	Dec 7, 1949	Memorial Hall, Dayton, Ohio, U.S.	
28	Win	27–1	Jimmy Bivins	UD	10	Oct 26, 1949	Philadelphia Convention Center, Philadelphia, Pennsylvania, U.S.	
27	Win	26–1	Henry Hall	UD	10	Jul 25, 1949	Borchert Field, Milwaukee, Wisconsin, U.S	
26	Win	25–1	Henry Hall	UD	10	Jun 16, 1949	Milwaukee Auditorium, Milwaukee, Wisconsin, U.S.	
25	Loss	24–1	Archie Moore	UD	10	Apr 26, 1949	Philadelphia Convention Center, Philadelphia, Pennsylvania, U.S.	
24	Win	24–0	Arturo Godoy	UD	10	Feb 23, 1949	Philadelphia Convention Center, Philadelphia, Pennsylvania, U.S.	
23	Win	23–0	Willie Brown	KO	7 (8)	Dec 14, 1948	Philadelphia Convention Center, Philadelphia, Pennsylvania, U.S.	
22	Win	22–0	Jim Holden	PTS	8	Nov 9, 1948	Little Palestra, Allentown, Pennsylvania, U.S.	
21	Win	21–0	Agostinho Guedes	TKO	3 (10)	Sep 28, 1948	Philadelphia Convention Center, Philadelphia, Pennsylvania, U.S.	
20	Win	20–0	Vernon Williams	PTS	8	May 13, 1948	Waltz Dream Arena, Atlantic City, New Jersey, U.S.	
19	Win	19–0	Kenny Harris	UD	10	Mar 29, 1948	Philadelphia Arena, Philadelphia, Pennsylvania, U.S.	
18	Win	18–0	Kenny Harris	UD	8	Mar 1, 1948	Philadelphia Arena, Philadelphia, Pennsylvania, U.S.	
17	Win	17–0	Kid Wolfe	PTS	8	Dec 11, 1947	Waltz Dream Arena, Atlantic City, New Jersey, U.S.	
16	Win	16–0	Herbie Katz	KO	1 (8)	Nov 24, 1947	Philadelphia Arena, Philadelphia, Pennsylvania, U.S.	
15	Win	15–0	Jimmy Moore	KO	5 (8)	Nov 6, 1947	Waltz Dream Arena, Atlantic City, New Jersey, U.S.	
14	Win	14–0	Eddie Beazley	TKO	1 (6)	Oct 6, 1947	Philadelphia Arena, Philadelphia, Pennsylvania, U.S.	
13	Win	13–0	Al Pinel	PTS	6	Aug 4, 1947	Philadelphia Municipal Stadium, Philadelphia, Pennsylvania, U.S.	
12	Win	12–0	Tommy Ruth	KO	6 (8)	Jul 8, 1947	Philadelphia Arena Stadium, Philadelphia, Pennsylvania, U.S.	
11	Win	11–0	Fred Lester	TKO	8 (8)	May 26, 1947	Philadelphia Arena, Philadelphia, Pennsylvania, U.S.	
10	Win	10–0	Leon Szymurski	TKO	3 (6)	Apr 28, 1947	Philadelphia Arena, Philadelphia, Pennsylvania, U.S.	
9	Win	9–0	Tony Gillo	PTS	6	Mar 10, 1947	Philadelphia Arena, Philadelphia, Pennsylvania, U.S.	
8	Win	8–0	Joe Van Loan	TKO	2 (6)	Feb 17, 1947	Philadelphia Arena, Philadelphia, Pennsylvania, U.S.	
7	Win	7–0	Jim Holden	KO	4 (6)	Feb 10, 1947	William Allen High School, Allentown, Pennsylvania, U.S.	
6	Win	6–0	Chappie Manning	PTS	6	Jan 24, 1947	Armory (military), Reading Armory, Reading, Pennsylvania, U.S.	
5	Win	5–0	Frank Lowry	TKO	2 (6)	Jan 10, 1947	Sports club, Cambria A.C., Philadelphia, Pennsylvania, U.S.	
4	Win	4–0	Randy Ingram	KO	4 (6)	Oct 25, 1946	Sports club, Cambria A.C., Philadelphia, Pennsylvania, U.S.	
3	Win	3–0	Jimmy Kennedy	PTS	6	Sep 9, 1946	Allentown, Pennsylvania, U.S.	
2	Win	2–0	Ted Simmons	KO	2 (4)	Aug 13, 1946	Wilmington, Delaware, U.S.	
1	Win	1–0	Dick Brewster	KO	2 (4)	Jun 18, 1946	Wilmington, Delaware, U.S.	

== Titles in boxing ==
=== Major world titles ===
- NYSAC light heavyweight champion (175 lbs)
- NBA (WBA) light heavyweight champion (Note: The NBA was renamed the WBA during his reign.) (175 lbs)
- WBC light heavyweight champion (Note: Awarded inaugural title on February 14, 1963.) (175 lbs)

=== The Ring magazine titles ===
- The Ring light heavyweight champion (175 lbs)

=== Undisputed titles ===
- Undisputed light heavyweight champion

== See also ==
- List of light heavyweight boxing champions

== Notes and references ==
=== References ===
Achievements
Preceded by Archie Moore; Stripped	NBA-WBA Light Heavyweight Champion; February 7, 1961 – June 1, 1963; The NBA became the WBA on August 23, 1962	Succeeded by Willie Pastrano
Preceded by Archie Moore; Vacated	World Light Heavyweight Champion; May 12, 1962 – June 1, 1963	Succeeded by Willie Pastrano
Preceded by Inaugural Champion	WBC Light Heavyweight Champion; February 14, 1963 – June 1, 1963	Succeeded by Willie Pastrano
