= Rocky Marciano vs. Archie Moore =

Boxing match

- Date: September 21, 1955
- Venue: Yankee Stadium, New York City, New York, U.S.
- Title(s) on the line: NYSAC, NBA and The Ring undisputed heavyweight championship

Tale of the tape
Boxer	(United States) Rocky Marciano	(United States) Archie Moore
Nickname	"The Brockton Blockbuster"	"The Old Mongoose"
Hometown	Brockton, Massachusetts	Benoit, Mississippi
Purse	$482,374	$241,187
Pre-fight record	48–0 (42 KO)	149–19–8 (108 KO)
Age	32 years	41 years, 9 months
Height	5 ft 10 in (178 cm)	5 ft 11 in (180 cm)
Weight	188 lb (85 kg)	188 lb (85 kg)
Style	Orthodox	Orthodox
Recognition	NYSAC, NBA, and The Ring; Undisputed Heavyweight Champion	NYSAC, NBA, and The Ring; Undisputed Light Heavyweight Champion

Result
- Marciano won via 9th-round KO

Rocky Marciano vs. Archie Moore was a professional boxing match contested on September 21, 1955, for the undisputed heavyweight championshipbetween Rocky Marciano, the undefeated heavyweight champion, and Archie Moore, the light-heavyweight champion. Marciano knocked Moore out in the ninth round, winning his 49th and final fight before retiring.

== Background ==
Both men had won their respective championship titles in 1952. While Marciano defended his title, Moore climbed through the heavyweight ranks, defeating several top contenders (most notable was two victories over top contender Niño Valdés), and by 1955 was ranked #1 heavyweight contender, ultimately leading to him receiving a title shot later that year. The fight would be Marciano's sixth title defense.

The fight was one of the most anticipated sports events of the year, featuring two popular champions both with a large number of knockouts. Moore in particular created a lot of publicity by confidently claiming that he would be the first man to defeat Marciano. Although Moore was nine years older than Marciano, he was far more experienced, and after having studied film of Marciano's fights, believed he had crafted a successful plan to defeat him.

The fight was held at Yankee Stadium in New York. It was originally scheduled for September 20, but it was postponed by one day due to Hurricane Ione.

Marciano was a 4 to 1 favourite to win.

== The fight ==
Instead of a short slugfest, the fight was a very tactical match, with both men attempting to impose their respective styles upon the other. Marciano spent much of the fight on the offensive, trying to break through Moore's defense, while Moore cleverly boxed and moved. Moore began the fight well, using his jab and combinations at range, along with his defense to keep the ever approaching champion off balance, and did well in the fierce exchanges at close range. In the second round, Moore threw a counter right hand that dropped the champion. Marciano took a four count, but soon recovered.

As the fight progressed, Marciano's constant pressure began to wear Moore down, and found himself increasingly being cornered and forced to take punishment. In round six, Marciano dropped Moore twice, first with a right hook towards the beginning, and a second time after taking a barrage of punches at the end of the round. Moore survived the seventh round without being knocked down, but was knocked down a third time at the end of the eighth but was saved by the bell, though the end was near. In the ninth round, Marciano backed Moore up against the ropes, and after landing two consecutive left hooks to the head, dropped Moore for a fourth time, who did not beat the referee's count.

== Aftermath ==
The fight was Marciano's 49th and final professional boxing match, and he announced his retirement six months later in 1956. That year, following his retirement, Moore remained the top heavyweight contender, and following a brief tournament, ultimately fought Floyd Patterson for the vacant heavyweight title in November. Moore was defeated and never fought for the heavyweight title again, but retained his light-heavyweight title into the 1960s.

== Undercard ==
Confirmed bouts:

Preceded by vs. Don Cockell	Rocky Marciano's bouts 21 September 1955	Retired
Preceded by vs. Bobo Olson	Archie Moore's bouts 21 September 1955	Succeeded by vs. Howard King
