= Archie Moore =

American professional boxer (1913–1998)

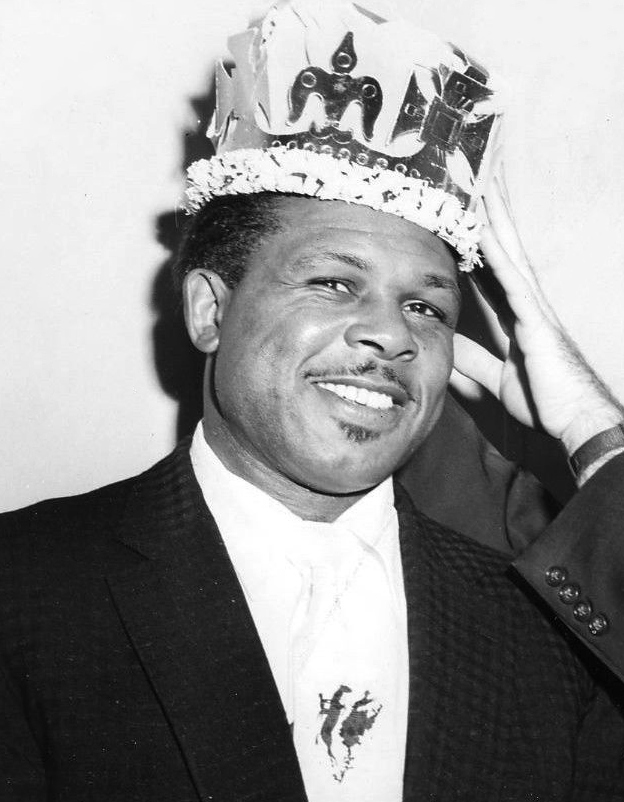
- Moore in 1955

Personal information
- Nicknames: The (Old) Mongoose; Ancient Archie
- Born: Archibald Lee Wright; December 13, 1913 Benoit, Mississippi, U.S.
- Died: December 9, 1998 (aged 84) San Diego, California, U.S.
- Height: 5 ft 11 in (1.80 m)
- Weight: Middleweight; Light heavyweight Heavyweight

Boxing career
- Reach: 75 in (191 cm)
- Stance: Orthodox

Boxing record
- Total fights: 220
- Wins: 186
- Win by KO: 132
- Losses: 23
- Draws: 10
- No contests: 1

2nd President of the Cauliflower Alley Club
- In office 1991–1992
- Preceded by: Mike Mazurki
- Succeeded by: Lou Thesz

Archie Moore (born Archibald Lee Wright; December 13, 1913 – December 9, 1998) was an American professional boxer and the longest reigning World Light Heavyweight Champion of all time (1952 – 1962). He had one of the longest professional careers in the history of the sport, competing from 1935 to 1963. Nicknamed "the Mongoose", and then "the Old Mongoose" in the latter half of his career, Moore was a highly strategic and defensive boxer. As of September 2025, BoxRec ranks Moore as the greatest light heavyweight boxer of all time.

Moore was named the greatest light heavyweight of all time by the Associated Press in 1999, and his 132 career knockouts remains second in the all-time record. He also ranks fourth on The Ring's list of "100 greatest punchers of all time". Moore was also a trainer for a short time after retirement, training Muhammad Ali, George Foreman, Bob Foster, Eddie Mustafa Muhammad, Earnie Shavers and James Tillis.

Born in Benoit, Mississippi, Moore was raised in St. Louis, Missouri, and grew up in poverty. Moore was denied a shot at the world title for 15 years, and spent many of those years fighting on the road with little to show for it. An important figure in the American Black community, he became involved in African American causes once his days as a fighter were over. He also established himself as a successful character actor in television and film. Moore died in his adopted home of San Diego, California; he was 84 years old.

== Early life ==
Moore was born Archibald Lee Wright, the son of Thomas Wright, a farm laborer and drifter, and Lorena Wright. Though he always insisted that he was born in 1916 in Collinsville, Illinois, his mother told reporters that he was actually born in 1913 in Benoit, Mississippi. His father abandoned the family when Archie was an infant. Unable to provide for him and his older sister, his mother gave them into the care of an uncle and aunt, Cleveland and Willie Pearl Moore, who lived in St. Louis. Archie later explained why he was given their surname: "It was less questions to be called Moore."

He attended segregated all-Black schools in St. Louis, including Lincoln High School, although he never graduated. His uncle and aunt provided him with a stable upbringing, but after his uncle died in a freak accident around 1928, Moore began running with a street gang. One of his first thefts was a pair of oil lamps from his home, which he sold so that he would have money to buy boxing gloves. He later recalled of his stealing: "It was inevitable that I would be caught. I think I knew this even before I started, but somehow the urge to have a few cents in my pocket made me overlook this eventuality". After he was arrested for attempting to steal change from a motorman's box on a streetcar, he was sentenced to a three-year term at a reform school in Booneville, Missouri. He was released early from the school for good behavior after serving twenty-two months.

Around 1933 Moore joined the Civilian Conservation Corps, working for the forestry division at a camp in Poplar Bluff, Missouri. Determined to become a boxer, he decided to make his work at the camp a form of training. He later recalled that the other boys constantly kidded him about one daily exercise—standing upright in the bed of a truck as it drove along primitive forest roads, waiting until the last possible moment before ducking or weaving away from tree branches.

== Boxing career ==
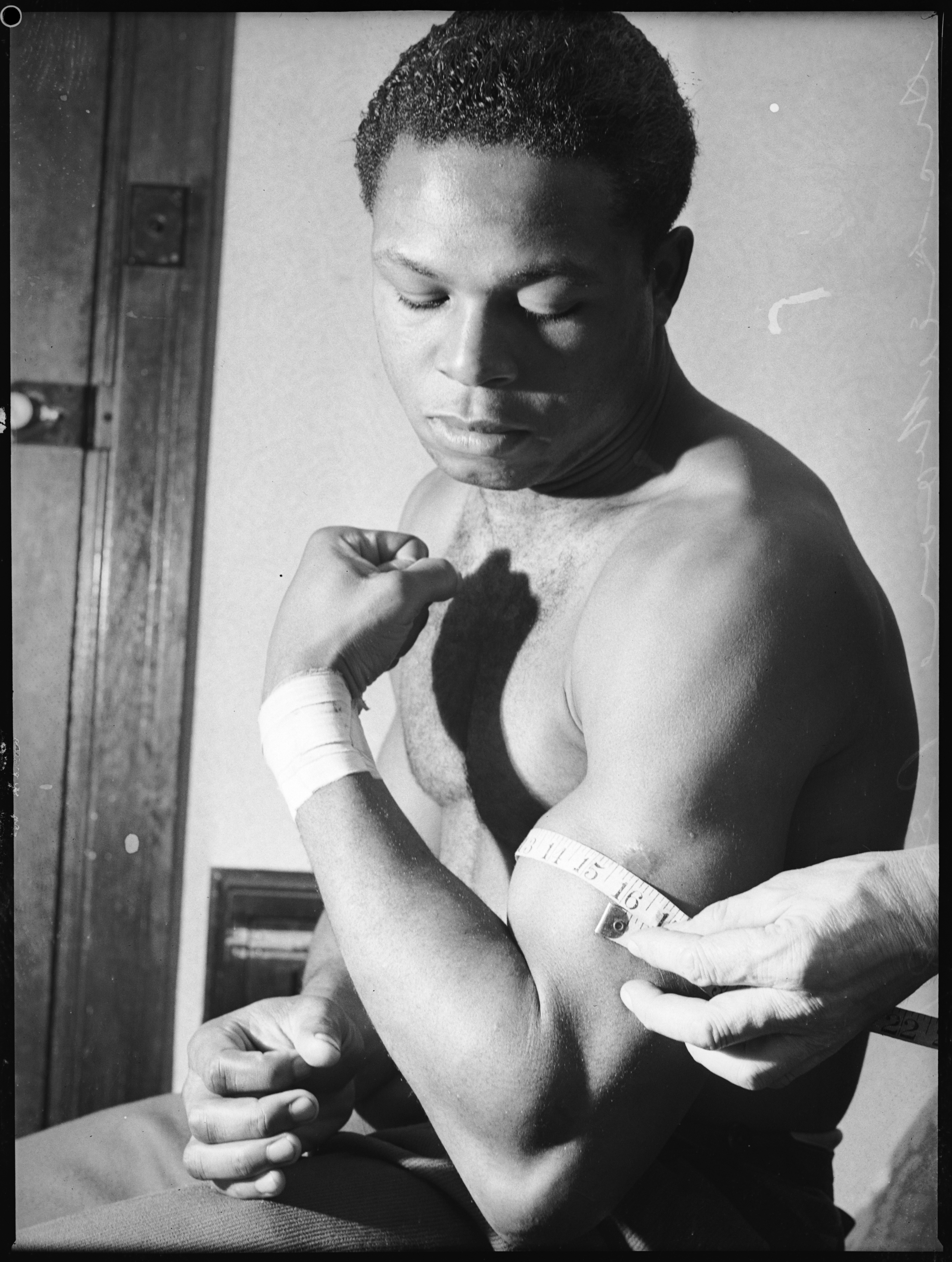
Archie Moore boxer, Sydney, 2 May 1940

The captain of the camp permitted him to organize a boxing team, which competed in Golden Gloves tournaments in southern Missouri and Illinois. Many of his fights occurred in a racially charged atmosphere; he later described one of them, against a white boxer named Bill Richardson in Poplar Bluff:

I knocked him down with a volley of head punches about one minute into round one. His brother ... was the referee. He was furious at me and told me to keep my punches up. Since I had been hitting Bill in the head I would have missed him altogether if I threw my punches any higher. But the referee said I had fouled him. ... I got steamed at this and offered to fight [the referee], too. I resolved not to hit Bill any place but his head. ... In the second round I dropped him with a left hook that spun his head like a top. ... I heard a man at ringside say, "For two cents I'd shoot that nigger."

=== First retirement and comeback ===
Moore had four fights in 1941, during which he went 2–1–1, with the draw against Eddie Booker. By then, however, he had suffered through several stomach ulcers and the resulting operations, and had announced his retirement from boxing.

His retirement was brief. By 1942 he was back in the ring. He won his first six bouts that year, including a second-round knockout of Hogue in a rematch, and a ten-round decision over Jack Chase. He met Booker in a rematch, and reached the same conclusion as their first meeting had: another 10-round draw.

In 1943, Moore fought seven bouts, winning five and losing two. He won and then lost the California State Middleweight title against Chase, both by 15-round decisions, and beat Chase again in his last bout of that year, in a ten-round decision. He also lost a decision to Aaron Wade that year.

=== The Atlantic Coast ===
In 1944, he had nine bouts, going 7–2. His last bout that year marked his debut on the Atlantic Coast, and the level of his opposition began to improve. He beat Jimmy Hayden by a knockout in five, lost to future Hall of Famer Charlie Burley by a decision, and to Booker by a knockout in eight.

He won his first eight bouts of 1945, impressing Atlantic coast boxing experts and earning a fight with light heavyweight Jimmy Bivins, a boxer that was not considered a hard puncher, who defeated Moore by a knockout in six at Cleveland. He returned to the Eastern Seaboard to fight five more times before that year was over. He met, among others, light heavyweight Holman Williams during that span, losing a ten-round decision, and knocking him out in eleven in the rematch.

By 1946, Moore had moved to the light heavyweight division and he went 5–2–1 that year, beating contender Curtis Sheppard, but losing to future World Heavyweight Champion and Hall of Famer Ezzard Charles by a decision in ten, and drawing with old nemesis Chase. By then, Moore began complaining publicly that, according to him, none of boxing's world champions would risk their titles fighting him. 1947 was essentially a year of rematches for Moore. He went 7–1 that year, his one loss being to Charles. He beat Chase by a knockout in nine, Sheppard by a decision in ten and Bivins by a knockout in nine. He also defeated Burt Lytell, by a decision in ten. On June 2, 1948, Leonard Morrow (12–2–1) KO’d Archie Moore (92–14–7) in the first round to win the California light heavyweight championship. He fought a solid 14 fights in 1948, losing again to Charles by a knockout in nine, losing to Henry Hall by a decision in ten and to Lloyd Gibson by a disqualification in four. But he also beat Ted Lowry, by a decision in ten, and Hall in a rematch, also by decision.

In 1949, he had 13 bouts, going 12–1. He defeated the Alabama Kid twice; by knockout in four and by knockout in three, Bob Satterfield by a knockout in three, Bivins by a knockout in eight, future World Light Heavyweight Champion and IBHOF inductee Harold Johnson by a decision, Bob Sikes by a knockout in three and Phil Muscato by a decision. He lost to Clinton Bacon by a disqualification in six. By Moore's standards, 1950 was a vacation year for him: he only had two fights, winning both, including a 10-round decision in a rematch with Lydell.

In 1951, Moore boxed 18 times, winning 16, losing one, and drawing one. He went on an Argentinian tour, fighting seven times there, winning six and drawing one. In between those seven fights, he found time for a trip to Montevideo, Uruguay, where he defeated Vicente Quiroz by a knockout in six. He knocked out Bivins in nine and split two decisions with Johnson.

=== World Light Heavyweight Champion ===
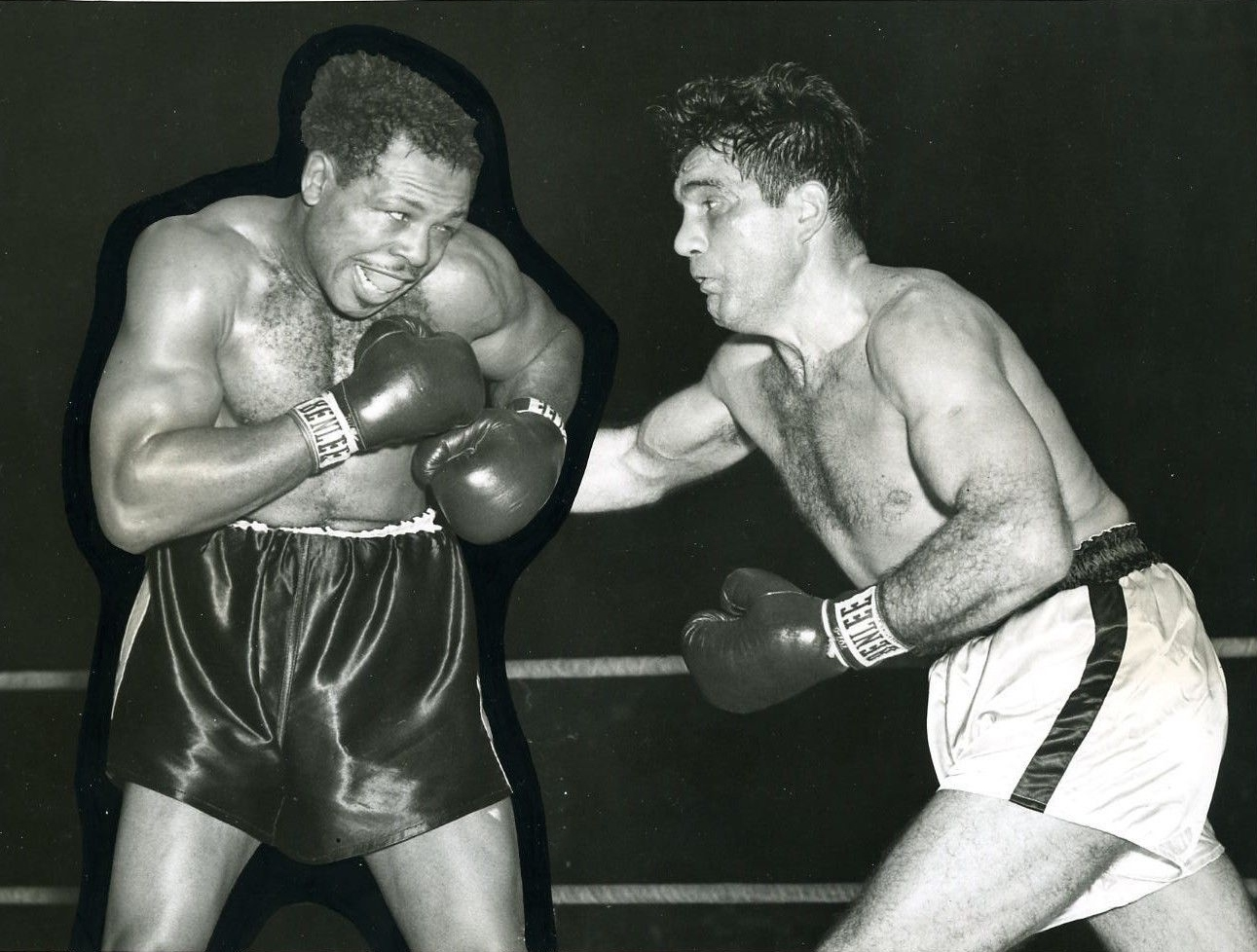
Archie Moore vs. Joey Maxim in December 1952

1952 was one of the most important years in Moore's life. After beating Johnson, heavyweight contenders Jimmy Slade, Bob Dunlap, and Clarence Henry and light heavyweight Clinton Bacon (knocked out in four in a rematch), Moore was finally given an opportunity at age 36 (he later learned he was actually nearly 39, his mother confirming he had been born in 1913, not 1916) to fight for the title of World Light Heavyweight Champion against future IBHOF honoree Joey Maxim. Maxim had just defeated the great Sugar Ray Robinson by a technical knockout in 14 rounds, forcing Robinson to quit in his corner due to heat exhaustion. Against Maxim, Moore consistently landed powerful right hands, hurting him several times en route to a fifteen-round decision. After sixteen long years, he had finally achieved his dream. The next year, Moore won all nine of his bouts, including a 10-round, non-title win against then fringe heavyweight contender Nino Valdez of Cuba and a 15-round decision over Maxim in a rematch to retain the belt. He made two more bouts in Argentina before the end of the year.

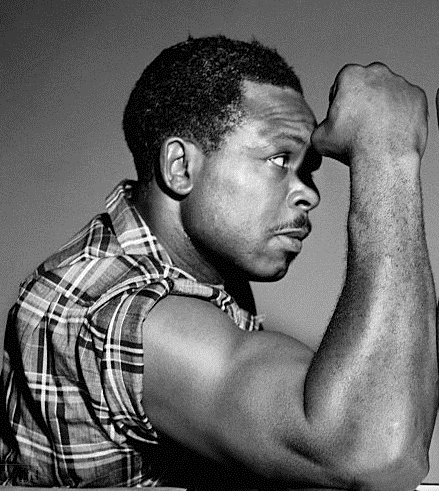
Archie Moore in 1954

In 1954, he had only four fights, retaining the title in a third fight with Maxim, who once again went the 15 round distance, and versus Johnson, whom he knocked out in 14. He also beat highly ranked heavyweight Bob Baker. In 1955, Moore again beat Valdez, who by that time was the no. 1 heavyweight contender, and defended against Bobo Olson, the World Middleweight Champion and future Hall of Famer who was coming off a decision victory over Joey Maxim, by a knockout in three.

"The Mongoose" received two cracks at the heavyweight championship of the world. On September 21, 1955, Moore faced future Hall of Famer Rocky Marciano at New York's Yankee Stadium. The fight was originally scheduled for September 20, according to Trilogy Book. It was in this fight Archie came closest to wearing the belt. A Moore surprise right hand in the 2nd round sent Marciano down for the second and final time in his career, setting the stage for a legendary battle, but also creating controversy as far as shared memory. In subsequent years Moore made much of Referee Harry Kessler's handling of the pivotal moment. A half-decade on, in Archie's autobiography, The Archie Moore Story (1960), he describes in detail the referee, though Rocky arose at "two", continuing a superfluous mandatory eight-count: "...Kessler went on, three, four. The mandatory count does not apply in championship bouts (1955)...My seconds were screaming for me to finish him and I moved to do so, but Kessler...carefully wiped off Rocky's gloves, giving him another few seconds...he gave him a sort of stiff jerk, which may have helped Rocky clear his head." Moore admits to being angry enough at what he saw as interference, he went recklessly, "blind and stupid with rage", going for the knockout, toe-to-toe. This resentment toward referee Kessler appears only to have grown more entrenched. By the time of a recorded interview with Peter Heller, in October, 1970, Archie had this to say: "(Kessler) had no business refereeing that match because he was too excitable. He didn't know what to do...He grabbed Marciano's gloves and began to wipe Marciano's gloves and look over his shoulder...I'll never forget it. It cost me the heavyweight title."

This grudge, however, was not mutual. In his own autobiography, Harry Kessler indeed recounts Marciano-Moore with a great excitement, frequently employing exclamation marks in his punctuation, going so far as a direct comparison to the donnybrook between Jack Dempsey and Luis Firpo. Yet, the third man is evenhanded in his praise, taking time over most of a chapter on the bout, to laud Moore. His praise for Moore include the following quotes: "Archie had exuded a stalwart confidence from his training camp..." "Archie Moore had more punches in his arsenal than Robin Hood and all his Merry Men had arrows in their quivers..." "Archie Moore was probably as sure a fighter as ever set foot in the ring..." "No one ever questioned Archie Moore's courage...". As for the knockdown, described here also in detail, Kessler offers a perspective directly contradicting Moore's, saying "I didn't bother to wipe Marciano's gloves on my shirt before I waved them back to combat; that early in the drama, there was no resin on the canvas." As opposed to any blind rage, Kessler states that "Archie hesitated a couple of seconds before he came in." With humor and without malice, Kessler even recounts the 41-year-old Moore poo-pooing any talk of retirement at the postfight press conference, then sitting in on bass fiddle at a hotspot in Greenwich Village until 5 a.m.!

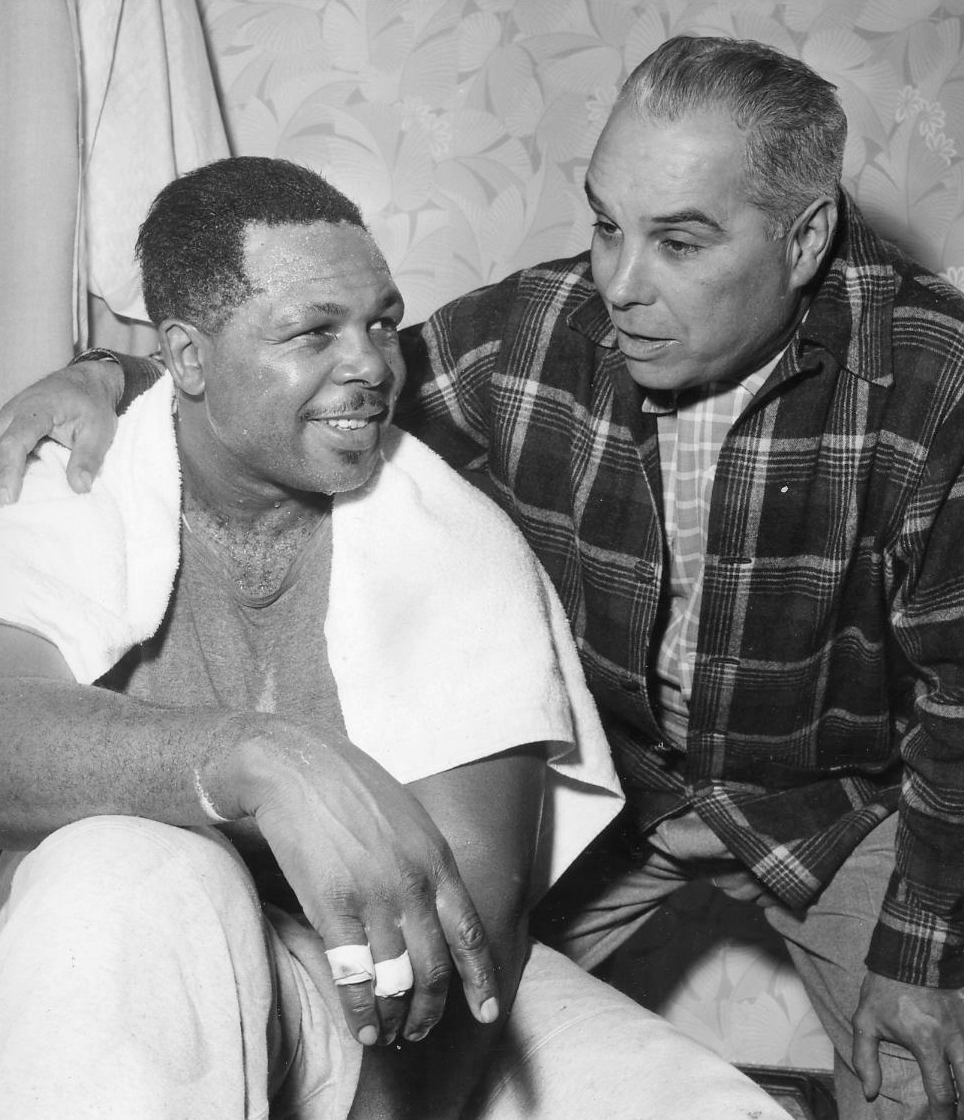
Archie Moore and Onyx Roach in 1956

In 1956, Moore fought mostly as a heavyweight but did retain his Light Heavyweight title with a ten-round knockout over Yolande Pompey in London. He won 11 bouts in a row before challenging again for the World Heavyweight Championship. The title was left vacant by Marciano, but Moore lost to Floyd Patterson by a knockout in five (Patterson, yet another future Hall of Famer, himself made history that night, becoming, at the age of 21, the youngest World Heavyweight Champion yet, a record he would hold until 1986).

Moore won all six of his bouts during 1957. Among those wins was an easy 10-round decision over heavyweight contender Hans Kalbfell in Germany, a knockout in 7 rounds over highly ranked Tony Anthony to retain the light heavyweight title, a one-sided 10-round decision over light heavyweight contender Eddie Cotton in a non-title bout and a 4th-round knockout of future top ten heavyweight contender Roger Rischer. In 1958, Moore had 10 fights, going 9–0–1 during that span. His fight with Yvon Durelle in particular was of note: defending his world light heavyweight title in Montreal, Quebec, Canada, he was felled three times in round one, and once again in round five, but then dropped Durelle in round 10 and won by a knockout in the 11th. 1959, his last full year as uncontested champion, was another rare low-profile year; in his two fights, he beat Sterling Davis by a knockout in three, and then Durelle again, also by a knockout in three, to once again retain his World Light Heavyweight title.

In 1960, Moore was stripped of his World Light Heavyweight title by the National Boxing Association (NBA) for taking too long to defend his title, but continued to be recognized by most major boxing authorities including the New York State Athletic Commission and The Ring Magazine. Moore won three of his four bouts in 1960, one by decision against Buddy Turman in Dallas, his lone loss coming in a ten-round decision versus Giulio Rinaldi in Rome. In 1961, he defeated Turman again by decision in Manila, Philippines before defending his Lineal World Light Heavyweight Championship for what would be the last time, beating Rinaldi by a 15-round decision to retain the belt. In his last fight that year, he once again ventured into the heavyweights, and met Pete Rademacher, a man who had made history earlier in his career by becoming the first man ever to challenge for a world title in his first professional bout (when he lost to Patterson by a knockout in six). Moore beat Rademacher by a knockout in nine.

In 1962, the remaining boxing commissions that had continued to back Moore as the World Light Heavyweight Champion withdrew their recognition. He campaigned exclusively as a heavyweight from then on, and beat Alejandro Lavorante by a knockout in 10 and Howard King by a knockout in one round in Tijuana. He then drew against future World Light Heavyweight Champion Willie Pastrano in a 10-round heavyweight contest. On the posters advertising that fight, Moore was billed as the "World Light Heavyweight Champion." The bout took place in California, which had not yet withdrawn recognition from Moore at the time the Moore-Pastrano fight was signed. By the time the bout took place, the California commission, like New York, Massachusetts, the EBU and Ring Magazine, had recognized Harold Johnson, who had beaten Doug Jones 16 days earlier, as the new Light Heavyweight Champion. Johnson had reigned as the NBA (WBA) Champion since February 7, 1961. Then, in his last fight of note, the 49 year-old Moore faced a young heavyweight out of Louisville named Cassius Clay (Muhammad Ali). Moore had been Clay's trainer for a time, but Clay became dissatisfied and left Moore because of Moore's attempts to change his style and his insistence that Clay do dishes and help clean gym floors. In the days before the fight, Clay had rhymed that "Archie Moore...Must fall in four." Moore replied that he had perfected a new punch for the match: The Lip-Buttoner. Nonetheless, as Clay predicted, Moore was beaten by a knockout in four rounds. Moore is the only man to have faced both Rocky Marciano and Muhammad Ali. After one more fight in 1963, a third-round knockout win over Mike DiBiase in Phoenix, Moore announced his retirement from boxing, for good.

== Fighting style ==
Moore's style relied heavily on the armadillo defense, also known as crab style of boxing, which includes the cross-armed guard. Moore later taught this to George Foreman who used it extensively during his comeback. Moore also made heavy use of shoulder rolls to avoid punches and set up counters. This style allowed Moore to not only avoid much damage while fighting, leading to his long career, but to score the most knockouts in boxing history.

== Post-retirement ==
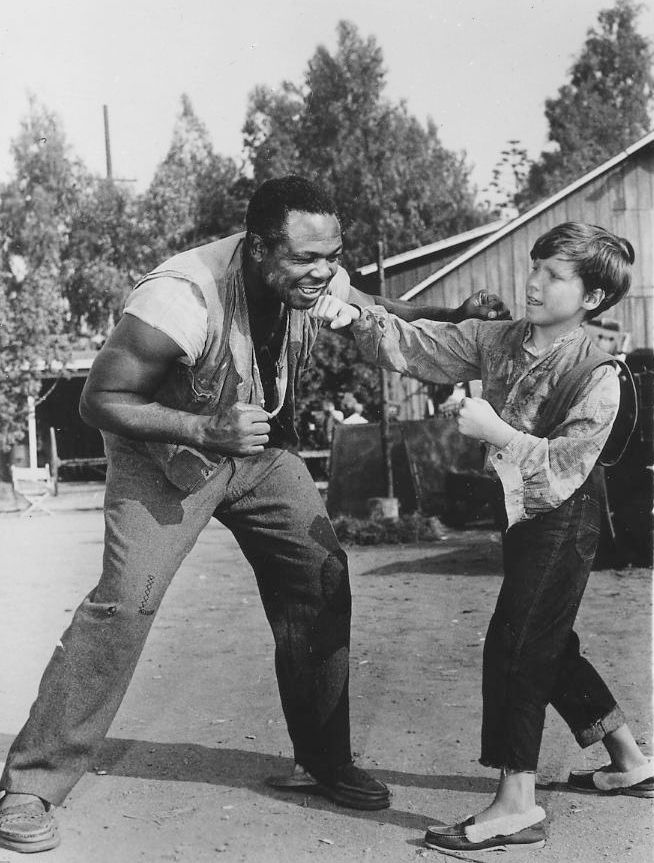
Archie Moore and Eddie Hodges in The Adventures of Huckleberry Finn

Despite retiring, Moore couldn't escape the limelight, and received numerous awards and dedications. In 1965, he was given the key to the city of San Diego, California. In 1970, he was named "Man of The Year" by Listen Magazine, and received the key to the city of Sandpoint, Idaho. He was elected in 1985 to the St. Louis city Boxing Hall of Fame and he received the Rocky Marciano Memorial Award in the city of New York in 1988. In 1990, he became a member of the International Boxing Hall of Fame in Canastota, New York, being one of the original members of that institution.

At one point the oldest boxer to win the World's Light Heavyweight Championship, he is believed to have been the only boxer who boxed professionally in the eras of Joe Louis, Rocky Marciano and Muhammad Ali. He is one of only a handful of boxers whose careers spanned four decades, retiring with a final record of 186 wins, 23 losses, 10 draws and 1 no contest, with 131 official knockouts.

However, at least three of Moore's 131 knockouts came in less-than-competitive matches against pro wrestlers: "Professor" Roy Shire in 1956, Sterling Davis in 1959 and Mike DiBiase in 1963 (Moore's 131st and final knockout). All three matches are officially listed as third-round TKO stoppages. The second-highest amount of knockouts in boxing history is 128, which belongs to Sam Langford.

During the 1960s he founded an organization called Any Boy Can, which taught boxing to underprivileged youth in the San Diego area. In 1974 he helped train heavyweight boxer George Foreman for his famous "Rumble in the Jungle" title bout in Zaire against Muhammad Ali. In 1976 he served as an assistant coach for the Nigerian Olympic boxing team. Actively involved in efforts to teach children about the dangers of drug abuse, he worked during the 1980s as a youth boxing instructor for the federal Department of Housing and Urban Development, assigned largely to ghettos in San Diego and Los Angeles. "I try to pass on the arts I know: self-control, self-reliance, self-defense," he told a reporter. In the early 1990s he again worked as a trainer for George Foreman.

In 1960 he ran as a Democrat for the California State Assembly but was defeated.

== Acting career ==
In 1960, Moore was chosen to play the role of the runaway slave Jim in Michael Curtiz's The Adventures of Huckleberry Finn, based on the Mark Twain novel, opposite Eddie Hodges as Huck. Moore garnered positive reviews for his sympathetic portrayal of Jim, which some viewers still consider the best interpretation of this much-filmed role.

Moore did not choose to pursue a full-time career as an actor, but he did appear in films such as The Carpetbaggers (1964), The Hanged Man (1964) and The Fortune Cookie (1966), and on television in episodes of Family Affair, Perry Mason, Wagon Train, The Reporter, Batman (episode 35) and the soap opera One Life to Live. He also appeared in the critically acclaimed TV movie My Sweet Charlie. His later film appearances included the crime film The Outfit (1973), as a chef in Breakheart Pass (1975) with Charles Bronson, and a cameo role as himself in the 1982 film Penitentiary II, along with Leon Isaac Kennedy and Mr. T.

== Humanitarian ==
Boxing took Moore all over the world as a fighter, a civil rights activist, and a leader in the fight to influence the minds of the nation's youth. He arrived in Argentina in June 1951 for a rematch with the champion Abel Cestac. Moore's victory made headlines and caught the attention of the Argentinian President Juan Perón and his wife Eva for his selfless act helping children, buying them shoes, clothing, and building their confidence. Moore was invited to stay in Argentina and accept an appointment as the Minister of Welfare of Children. He declined the offer to continue his road to winning title fights.

In 1957, Moore founded Any Boy Can, a non-profit organization based in San Diego, California. ABC, as it was known, provides services to all who seek help regardless of age, race, creed, religion or national origin. Moore stated that the mission of ABC is to help the youth to "step off in life with their best foot forward." The students were taught good sportsmanship, respect, and confidence. They were instructed to look a person in the eye and give them a firm handshake. They addressed him as Instructor Moore. Word traveled fast about Moore's ABC program. He was invited to Jamaica and sponsored by the Jamaican Boxing Board of Control to train boys for the Olympics. He trained 600 boys using his ABC methods. In 1968, the ABC Foundation received the Freedom Foundation's Patriotism Award, a special citation for providing a challenge for youth to become contributing members of their communities and upholding the ideals and ideas that were present at the founding of our great nation. This recognition is one of many.

Based on his work with the youth, in 1981, Moore became the Presidential Appointee of Ronald Reagan to work under Samuel R. Pierce, Secretary of Housing and Urban Development (HUD). Under the national heading, Project Build, Moore taught boxing to underprivileged youth in and around the housing projects in California.

== Personal life ==
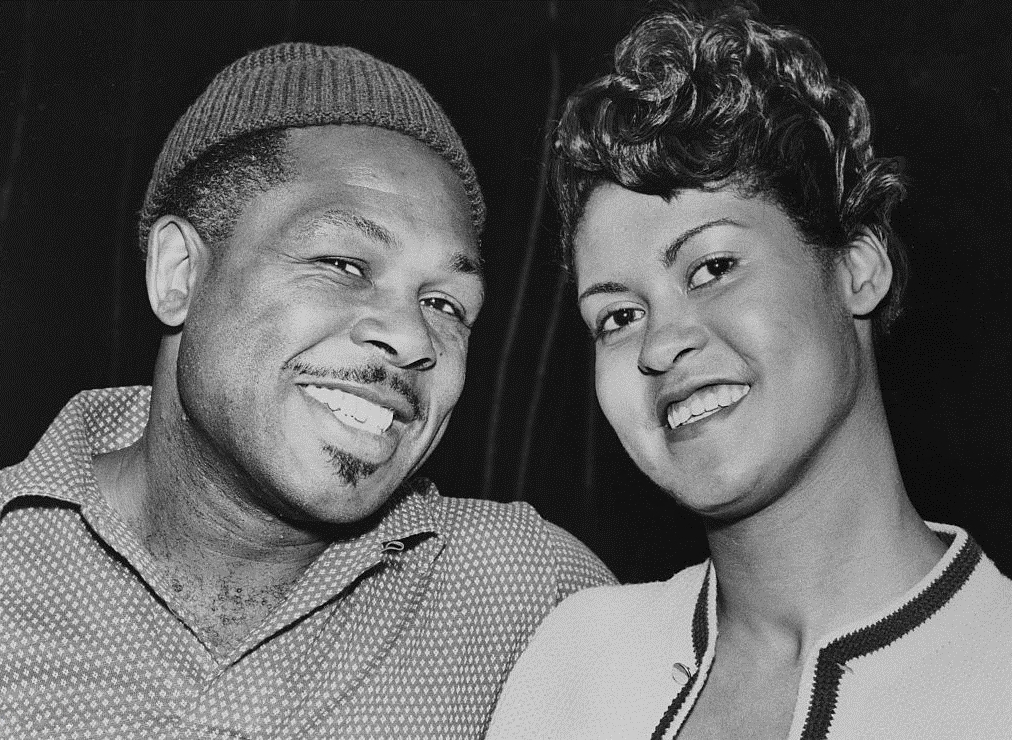
Archie Moore and Joan Hardy in 1956

Archie Moore had three daughters, Reena, J'Marie and Elizabeth Moore-Stump, and four sons, Archie Jr., Hardy, Anthony and D'Angelo. The marriage of Archie Moore and Elizabeth Thorton produced Archie Jr. and Elizabeth. In 1956, he married Joan Hardy and had five children: Reena, J'Marie, Hardy, Anthony and D'Angelo. They were married until his death in 1998.

Moore joined the Seventh-day Adventist Church later in life.

In 1997, J'Marie Moore became the first daughter of a famous boxer to herself become a professional boxer.

== Death ==
Moore died of heart failure on December 9, 1998, four days short of his 85th birthday. He was cremated and is interred in a niche at Cypress View Mausoleum and Crematory, in San Diego.

== Filmography ==
Year	Title	Role	Notes
1960	The Adventures of Huckleberry Finn	Jim	
1964	The Carpetbaggers	Jedediah	
1964	The Hanged Man	Xavier	TV movie
1966	The Fortune Cookie	Mr. Jackson	
1970	My Sweet Charlie		TV movie
1973	The Outfit	Packard	
1975	Breakheart Pass	Carlos	
1993	The Adventures of Huck Finn	cameo role	

== Legacy ==
- In 1965, Moore was also inducted by the San Diego Hall of Champions into the Breitbard Hall of Fame.
- In 1980, he was inducted into the World Boxing Hall of Fame.
- In 1990, he was inducted into the International Boxing Hall of Fame.
- In 2002, Archie Moore was inducted into the St. Louis Walk of Fame.
- In 2006, Moore was inducted into the California Boxing Hall of Fame.
- The Ring ranked Moore #4 on its "Best Punchers of all time" list in 2003 and #14 on its list of the "80 Best Fighters of the Last 80 Years."
- Moore was ranked as the #1 light heavyweight of all time by the International Boxing Research Organization in 2005.
- Moore was voted as the #1 light heavyweight of the 20th century by the Associated Press in 1999.
- Moore is rated the number sixth pound for pound fighter of all time by BoxRec.
- In 2025, US Rep. Darrell Issa introduced a bill to name a post office in Ramona, California after Moore.

== Professional boxing record ==
220 fights	186 wins	23 losses
By knockout	132	7
By decision	54	14
By disqualification	0	2
Draws	10	
No contests	1	

No.	Result	Record	Opponent	Type	Round	Date	Age	Location	Notes
220	Win	186–23–10 (1)	Mike DiBiase	TKO	3 (10)	Mar 15, 1963	49 years, 92 days	Madison Square Garden, Phoenix, Arizona, U.S.	
219	Loss	185–23–10 (1)	Cassius Clay	TKO	4 (12)	Nov 15, 1962	48 years, 337 days	Sports Arena, Los Angeles, California, U.S.	
218	Draw	185–22–10 (1)	Willie Pastrano	MD	10	May 28, 1962	48 years, 166 days	Sports Arena, Los Angeles, California, U.S.	
217	Win	185–22–9 (1)	Howard King	KO	1 (10)	May 7, 1962	48 years, 145 days	Plaza de Toros, Tijuana, Baja California, Mexico	
216	Win	184–22–9 (1)	Alejandro Lavorante	TKO	10 (10)	Mar 30, 1962	48 years, 107 days	Sports Arena, Los Angeles, California, U.S.	Lavorante was carried out on a stretcher
215	Win	183–22–9 (1)	Pete Rademacher	TKO	6 (10)	Oct 23, 1961	47 years, 314 days	Coliseum, Baltimore, Maryland, U.S.	
214	Win	182–22–9 (1)	Giulio Rinaldi	UD	15	Jun 10, 1961	47 years, 179 days	Madison Square Garden, New York City, New York, U.S.	Retained NYSAC and The Ring light heavyweight titles
213	Win	181–22–9 (1)	Buddy Turman	UD	10	Mar 25, 1961	47 years, 102 days	Araneta Coliseum, Barangay Cubao, Quezon City, Metro Manila, Philippines	
212	Win	180–22–9 (1)	Buddy Turman	UD	10	Nov 28, 1960	46 years, 351 days	Memorial Auditorium, Dallas, Texas, U.S.	
211	Loss	179–22–9 (1)	Giulio Rinaldi	PTS	10	Oct 29, 1960	46 years, 321 days	Palazzetto dello Sport, Roma, Lazio, Italy	
210	Win	179–21–9 (1)	George Abinet	RTD	3 (10)	Sep 13, 1960	46 years, 275 days	Memorial Auditorium, Dallas, Texas, U.S.	
209	Win	178–21–9 (1)	Willi Besmanoff	TKO	10 (15)	May 25, 1960	46 years, 164 days	Fairgrounds Coliseum, Indianapolis, Indiana, U.S.	Promoted as for "American Heavyweight Title"
208	Win	177–21–9 (1)	Yvon Durelle	KO	3 (15)	Aug 12, 1959	45 years, 242 days	Forum, Montreal, Quebec, Canada	Retained NYSAC, NBA, and The Ring light heavyweight titles
207	Win	176–21–9 (1)	Sterling Davis	TKO	3 (10)	Mar 9, 1959	45 years, 86 days	Ector County Coliseum, Odessa, Texas, U.S.	
206	Win	175–21–9 (1)	Yvon Durelle	KO	11 (15)	Dec 10, 1958	44 years, 362 days	Forum, Montreal, Quebec, Canada	Retained NYSAC, NBA, and The Ring light heavyweight titles
205	Draw	174–21–9 (1)	Howard King	PTS	10	Aug 4, 1958	44 years, 234 days	Moana Ball Park, Reno, Nevada, U.S.	
204	Win	174–21–8 (1)	Howard King	UD	10	Jun 9, 1958	44 years, 178 days	Memorial Auditorium, Sacramento, California, U.S.	
203	Win	173–21–8 (1)	Charley Norkus	UD	10	May 26, 1958	44 years, 164 days	Civic Auditorium, San Francisco, California, U.S.	
202	Win	172–21–8 (1)	Howard King	UD	10	May 17, 1958	44 years, 155 days	Coliseum, San Diego, California, U.S.	
201	Win	171–21–8 (1)	Willi Besmanoff	SD	10	May 2, 1958	44 years, 140 days	Freedom Hall, Louisville, Kentucky, U.S.	
200	Win	170–21–8 (1)	Bob Albright	TKO	7 (10)	Mar 10, 1958	44 years, 87 days	Exhibition Gardens, Vancouver, British Columbia, Canada	
199	Win	169–21–8 (1)	Bert Whitehurst	TKO	10 (10)	Mar 4, 1958	44 years, 81 days	Swing Auditorium, San Bernardino, California, U.S.	
198	Win	168–21–8 (1)	Julio Neves	KO	3 (10)	Feb 1, 1958	44 years, 50 days	Ginásio Gilberto Cardoso, Río de Janeiro, Rio de Janeiro, Brazil	
197	Win	167–21–8 (1)	Luis Ignacio	PTS	10	Jan 18, 1958	44 years, 36 days	Ginásio Estadual do Ibirapuera, Sao Paulo, Sao Paulo, Brazil	
196	Win	166–21–8 (1)	Roger Rischer	KO	4 (10)	Nov 29, 1957	43 years, 351 days	Auditorium, Portland, Oregon, U.S.	
195	Win	165–21–8 (1)	Eddie Cotton	UD	10	Nov 5, 1957	43 years, 327 days	Civic Auditorium, Seattle, Washington, U.S.	
194	Win	164–21–8 (1)	Ralph Hooker	TKO	5 (10)	Oct 31, 1957	43 years, 322 days	Exhibition Gardens, Vancouver, British Columbia, Canada	
193	Win	163–21–8 (1)	Tony Anthony	KO	7 (15)	Sep 20, 1957	43 years, 281 days	Olympic Auditorium, Los Angeles, California, U.S.	Retained NYSAC, NBA, and The Ring light heavyweight titles
192	Win	162–21–8 (1)	Alain Cherville	TKO	6 (10)	Jun 2, 1957	43 years, 171 days	Killesberghalle, Stuttgart, Baden-Württemberg, Germany	
191	Win	161–21–8 (1)	Hans Kalbfell	UD	10	May 1, 1957	43 years, 139 days	Dubois-Arena, Essen, Nordrhein-Westfalen, Germany	
190	Loss	160–21–8 (1)	Floyd Patterson	KO	5 (15)	Nov 30, 1956	42 years, 353 days	Chicago Stadium, Chicago, Illinois, U.S.	For vacant NYSAC, NBA, and The Ring heavyweight titles
189	Win	160–20–8 (1)	Roy Shire	TKO	3 (10)	Sep 8, 1956	42 years, 270 days	Ogden Stadium, Ogden, Utah, U.S.	
188	Win	159–20–8 (1)	James J. Parker	TKO	9 (15)	Jul 25, 1956	42 years, 225 days	Maple Leaf Stadium, Toronto, Ontario, Canada	
187	Win	158–20–8 (1)	Yolande Pompey	TKO	10 (15)	Jun 5, 1956	42 years, 175 days	Harringay Arena, Harringay, London, England	Retained NYSAC, NBA, and The Ring light heavyweight titles
186	Win	157–20–8 (1)	Gene Thompson	KO	3 (10)	Apr 30, 1956	42 years, 139 days	Sports Center, Tucson, Arizona, U.S.	
185	Win	156–20–8 (1)	Sonny Andrews	KO	4 (10)	Apr 26, 1956	42 years, 135 days	Edmonton Gardens, Edmonton, Alberta, Canada	
184	Win	155–20–8 (1)	George Parmentier	TKO	3 (10)	Apr 16, 1956	42 years, 125 days	Civic Auditorium, Seattle, Washington, U.S.	
183	Win	154–20–8 (1)	Willie Bean	TKO	5 (10)	Apr 10, 1956	42 years, 119 days	Auditorium, Richmond, California, U.S.	
182	Win	153–20–8 (1)	Howard King	UD	10	Mar 27, 1956	42 years, 105 days	Memorial Auditorium, Sacramento, California, U.S.	
181	Win	152–20–8 (1)	Frankie Daniels	UD	10	Mar 17, 1956	42 years, 95 days	Legion Stadium, Hollywood, California, U.S.	
180	Win	151–20–8 (1)	Bob Dunlap	KO	1 (10)	Feb 27, 1956	42 years, 76 days	Arena, San Diego, California, U.S.	
179	Win	150–20–8 (1)	Howard King	UD	10	Feb 20, 1956	42 years, 69 days	Winterland Arena, San Francisco, California, U.S.	
178	Loss	149–20–8 (1)	Rocky Marciano	KO	9 (15)	Sep 21, 1955	41 years, 282 days	Yankee Stadium, Bronx, New York City, New York, U.S.	For NYSAC, NBA, and The Ring heavyweight titles
177	Win	149–19–8 (1)	Bobo Olson	KO	3 (15)	Jun 22, 1955	41 years, 191 days	Polo Grounds, New York City, New York, U.S.	Retained NYSAC, NBA, and The Ring light heavyweight titles
176	Win	148–19–8 (1)	Niño Valdés	PTS	15	May 2, 1955	41 years, 140 days	Cashman Field, Las Vegas, Nevada, U.S.	Won vacant world heavyweight title recognized only by Nevada
175	Win	147–19–8 (1)	Harold Johnson	TKO	14 (15)	Aug 11, 1954	40 years, 241 days	Madison Square Garden, New York City, New York, U.S.	Retained NYSAC, NBA, and The Ring light heavyweight titles
174	Win	146–19–8 (1)	Bert Whitehurst	TKO	6 (10)	Jun 7, 1954	40 years, 176 days	St. Nicholas Arena, New York City, New York, U.S.	
173	Win	145–19–8 (1)	Bob Baker	TKO	9 (10)	Mar 9, 1954	40 years, 86 days	Auditorium, Miami Beach, Florida, U.S.	
172	Win	144–19–8 (1)	Joey Maxim	UD	15	Jan 27, 1954	40 years, 45 days	Orange Bowl, Miami, Florida, U.S.	Retained NYSAC, NBA, and The Ring light heavyweight titles
171	Win	143–19–8 (1)	Dogomar Martinez	PTS	10	Sep 12, 1953	39 years, 273 days	Estadio Luna Park, Buenos Aires, Distrito Federal, Argentina	
170	Win	142–19–8 (1)	Rinaldo Ansaloni	TKO	4 (10)	Aug 22, 1953	39 years, 252 days	Estadio Luna Park, Buenos Aires, Distrito Federal, Argentina	
169	Win	141–19–8 (1)	Joey Maxim	UD	15	Jun 24, 1953	39 years, 193 days	Ogden, Utah, U.S.	Retained NYSAC, NBA, and The Ring light heavyweight titles
168	Win	140–19–8 (1)	Frank Buford	TKO	9 (10)	Mar 30, 1953	39 years, 107 days	Coliseum, San Diego, California, U.S.	
167	Win	139–19–8 (1)	Al Spaulding	KO	3 (10)	Mar 17, 1953	39 years, 94 days	Armory, Spokane, Washington, U.S.	
166	Win	138–19–8 (1)	Niño Valdés	UD	10	Mar 11, 1953	39 years, 88 days	Arena, St. Louis, Missouri, U.S.	
165	Win	137–19–8 (1)	Sonny Andrews	TKO	5 (10)	Mar 3, 1953	39 years, 80 days	Memorial Auditorium, Sacramento, California, U.S.	
164	Win	136–19–8 (1)	Leonard Dugan	TKO	8 (10)	Feb 16, 1953	39 years, 65 days	Winterland Arena, San Francisco, California, U.S.	
163	Win	135–19–8 (1)	Toxie Hall	KO	4 (10)	Jan 27, 1953	39 years, 45 days	Sports Arena, Toledo, Ohio, U.S.	
162	Win	134–19–8 (1)	Joey Maxim	UD	15	Dec 17, 1952	39 years, 4 days	Arena, St. Louis, Missouri, U.S.	Won NYSAC, NBA, and The Ring light heavyweight titles
161	Win	133–19–8 (1)	Clinton Bacon	TKO	4 (10)	Jul 25, 1952	38 years, 225 days	Bears Stadium, Denver, Colorado, U.S.	
160	Win	132–19–8 (1)	Clarence Henry	UD	10	Jun 26, 1952	38 years, 196 days	Memorial Stadium, Baltimore, Maryland, U.S.	
159	Win	131–19–8 (1)	Bob Dunlap	KO	6 (10)	May 19, 1952	38 years, 158 days	Winterland Arena, San Francisco, California], U.S.	
158	Win	130–19–8 (1)	Jimmy Slade	UD	10	Feb 27, 1952	38 years, 76 days	Arena, St. Louis, Missouri, U.S.	
157	Win	129–19–8 (1)	Harold Johnson	UD	10	Jan 29, 1952	38 years, 47 days	Sports Arena, Toledo, Ohio, U.S.	
156	Loss	128–19–8 (1)	Harold Johnson	UD	10	Dec 10, 1951	37 years, 362 days	Arena, Milwaukee, Wisconsin, U.S.	
155	Win	128–18–8 (1)	Chubby Wright	TKO	7 (10)	Oct 29, 1951	37 years, 320 days	Kiel Auditorium, St. Louis, Missouri, U.S.	
154	Win	127–18–8 (1)	Harold Johnson	UD	10	Sep 25, 1951	37 years, 286 days	Arena, Philadelphia, Pennsylvania, U.S.	
153	Win	126–18–8 (1)	Embrel Davidson	KO	1 (10)	Sep 5, 1951	37 years, 266 days	Olympia Stadium, Detroit, Michigan, U.S.	
152	Win	125–18–8 (1)	Alfredo Lagay	KO	3 (10)	Aug 17, 1951	37 years, 247 days	Palacio de los Deportes, Bahía Blanca, Buenos Aires Province, Argentina	
151	Win	124–18–8 (1)	Rafael Miranda	TKO	4 (10)	Aug 5, 1951	37 years, 235 days	Palacio de los Deportes, Comodoro Rivadavia, Chubut, Argentina	
150	Win	123–18–8 (1)	Americo Capitanelli	KO	3 (10)	Jul 28, 1951	37 years, 227 days	San Miguel de Tucumán, Tucuman, Argentina	
149	Win	122–18–8 (1)	Victor Carabajal	KO	3 (12)	Jul 26, 1951	37 years, 225 days	Córdoba, Argentina	
148	Win	121–18–8 (1)	Vicente Quiroz	RTD	6 (10)	Jul 14, 1951	37 years, 213 days	Cine Boston, Montevideo, Uruguay	
147	Win	120–18–8 (1)	Alberto Santiago Lovell	KO	1 (12)	Jul 7, 1951	37 years, 206 days	Estadio Luna Park, Buenos Aires, Distrito Federal, Argentina	
146	Draw	119–18–8 (1)	Karel Sys	PTS	12	Jun 23, 1951	37 years, 192 days	Estadio Luna Park, Buenos Aires, Distrito Federal, Argentina	
145	Win	119–18–7 (1)	Abel Cestac	RTD	9 (12)	Jun 9, 1951	37 years, 178 days	Estadio Luna Park, Buenos Aires, Distrito Federal, Argentina	
144	Win	118–18–7 (1)	Art Henri	TKO	4 (10)	May 14, 1951	37 years, 152 days	Coliseum, Baltimore, Maryland, U.S.	
143	Win	117–18–7 (1)	Herman Harris	TKO	4 (10)	Apr 26, 1951	37 years, 134 days	I.M.A. Auditorium, Flint, Michigan, U.S	
142	Win	116–18–7 (1)	Abel Cestac	UD	10	Mar 13, 1951	37 years, 90 days	Sports Arena, Toledo, Ohio, U.S.	
141	Win	115–18–7 (1)	Jimmy Bivins	TKO	9 (10)	Feb 21, 1951	37 years, 70 days	St. Nicholas Arena, New York City, New York, U.S.	
140	Win	114–18–7 (1)	John Thomas	KO	1 (10)	Jan 28, 1951	37 years, 46 days	Estadio Olimpico, Panama City, Panama	
139	Win	113–18–7 (1)	Oakland Billy Smith	TKO	8 (10)	Jan 2, 1951	37 years, 20 days	Auditoriu, Portland, Oregon, U.S.	
138	Win	112–18–7 (1)	Vernon Williams	KO	2 (10)	Jul 31, 1950	36 years, 230 days	Marigold Gardens Outdoor Arena, Chicago, Illinois, U.S.	
137	Win	111–18–7 (1)	Bert Lytell	UD	10	Jan 31, 1950	36 years, 49 days	Sports Arena, Toledo, Ohio, U.S.	
136	Win	110–18–7 (1)	Leonard Morrow	KO	10 (15)	Dec 13, 1949	36 years, 0 days	Sports Arena, Toledo, Ohio, U.S.	
135	Win	109–18–7 (1)	Charley Williams	KO	8 (10)	Dec 6, 1949	35 years, 358 days	Auditorium, Hartford, Connecticut, U.S.	
134	Win	108–18–7 (1)	Phil Muscato	KO	6 (10)	Oct 24, 1949	35 years, 315 days	Sports Arena, Toledo, Ohio, U.S.	
133	Win	107–18–7 (1)	Bob Amos	UD	10	Oct 4, 1949	35 years, 295 days	Sports Arena, Toledo, Ohio, U.S.	
132	Win	106–18–7 (1)	Esco Greenwood	TKO	2 (10)	Jul 29, 1949	35 years, 228 days	Meadowbrook Arena, North Adams, Massachusetts, U.S.	
131	Win	105–18–7 (1)	Bob Sikes	TKO	3 (10)	Jun 27, 1949	35 years, 196 days	Outdoor Sports Arena, Indianapolis, Indiana, U.S.	
130	Loss	104–18–7 (1)	Clinton Bacon	DQ	6 (10)	Jun 13, 1949	35 years, 182 days	Outdoor Sports Arena, Indianapolis, Indiana, U.S.	Moore was disqualified for low blows
129	Win	104–17–7 (1)	Harold Johnson	UD	10	Apr 26, 1949	35 years, 134 days	Convention Hall, Philadelphia, Pennsylvania, U.S.	
128	Win	103–17–7 (1)	Jimmy Bivins	KO	8 (10)	Apr 11, 1949	35 years, 119 days	Sports Arena, Toledo, Ohio, U.S.	
127	Win	102–17–7 (1)	Dusty Wilkerson	TKO	6 (10)	Mar 23, 1949	35 years, 100 days	Convention Hall, Philadelphia, Pennsylvania, U.S.	
126	Win	101–17–7 (1)	Alabama Kid	KO	3 (10)	Mar 4, 1949	35 years, 81 days	Memorial Hall, Columbus, Ohio, U.S.	
125	Win	100–17–7 (1)	Bob Satterfield	KO	3 (10)	Jan 31, 1949	35 years, 49 days	Sports Arena, Toledo, Ohio, U.S.	
124	Win	99–17–7 (1)	Alabama Kid	KO	4 (10)	Jan 10, 1949	35 years, 28 days	Sports Arena, Toledo, Ohio, U.S.	
123	Win	98–17–7 (1)	Charley Williams	KO	7 (10)	Dec 27, 1948	35 years, 14 days	Coliseum, Baltimore, Maryland, U.S.	
122	Win	97–17–7 (1)	Bob Amos	UD	10	Dec 6, 1948	34 years, 359 days	Turner's Arena, Washington, D.C., U.S.	
121	Win	96–17–7 (1)	Henry Hall	UD	10	Nov 15, 1948	34 years, 338 days	Coliseum, Baltimore, Maryland, U.S.	
120	Loss	95–17–7 (1)	Lloyd Gibson	DQ	4 (10)	Nov 1, 1948	34 years, 324 days	Turner's Arena, Washington, D.C., U.S.	Moore was disqualified for low blows
119	Loss	95–16–7 (1)	Henry Hall	PTS	10	Oct 15, 1948	34 years, 307 days	Coliseum Arena, New Orleans, Louisiana, U.S.	
118	Win	95–15–7 (1)	Oakland Billy Smith	KO	4 (10)	Sep 20, 1948	34 years, 282 days	Coliseum, Baltimore, Maryland, U.S.	
117	Win	94–15–7 (1)	Ted Lowry	UD	10	Aug 2, 1948	34 years, 233 days	Coliseum, Baltimore, Maryland, U.S.	
116	Win	93–15–7 (1)	Jimmy Bivins	MD	10	Jun 28, 1948	34 years, 198 days	Coliseum, Baltimore, Maryland, U.S.	
115	Loss	92–15–7 (1)	Leonard Morrow	KO	1 (12)	Jun 2, 1948	34 years, 172 days	Auditorium, Oakland, California, U.S.	Lost USA California state light heavyweight title
114	Win	92–14–7 (1)	Oakland Billy Smith	UD	10	May 5, 1948	34 years, 144 days	Music Hall Arena, Cincinnati, Ohio, U.S.	
113	Win	91–14–7 (1)	Charley Williams	KO	7 (10)	Apr 19, 1948	34 years, 128 days	Laurel Garden, Newark, New Jersey, U.S.	
112	Win	90–14–7 (1)	Dusty Wilkerson	TKO	7 (10)	Apr 12, 1948	34 years, 121 days	Coliseum, Baltimore, Maryland, U.S.	
111	Loss	89–14–7 (1)	Ezzard Charles	KO	8 (15)	Jan 13, 1948	34 years, 31 days	Arena, Cleveland, Ohio, U.S.	
110	Win	89–13–7 (1)	George Fitch	TKO	6 (10)	Nov 10, 1947	33 years, 332 days	Coliseum, Baltimore, Maryland, U.S.	
109	Win	88–13–7 (1)	Jimmy Bivins	TKO	8 (10)	Sep 8, 1947	33 years, 269 days	5th Regiment Armory, Baltimore, Maryland, U.S.	
108	Win	87–13–7 (1)	Bobby Zander	PTS	12	Jul 30, 1947	33 years, 229 days	Auditorium, Oakland, California, U.S.	Won vacant USA California state light heavyweight title
107	Win	86–13–7 (1)	Bert Lytell	UD	10	Jul 14, 1947	33 years, 213 days	Coliseum, Baltimore, Maryland, U.S.	
106	Win	85–13–7 (1)	Curtis Sheppard	UD	10	Jun 16, 1947	33 years, 185 days	Griffith Stadium, Washington, D.C., U.S.	
105	Loss	84–13–7 (1)	Ezzard Charles	MD	10	May 5, 1947	33 years, 143 days	Music Hall Arena, Cincinnati, Ohio, U.S.	
104	Win	84–12–7 (1)	Rusty Payne	PTS	10	Apr 11, 1947	33 years, 119 days	Coliseum, San Diego, California, U.S.	
103	Win	83–12–7 (1)	Jack Chase	KO	9 (10)	Mar 18, 1947	33 years, 95 days	Olympic Auditorium, Los Angeles, California, U.S.	
102	Draw	82–12–7 (1)	Jack Chase	PTS	10	Nov 6, 1946	32 years, 328 days	Auditorium, Oakland, California, U.S.	
101	Draw	82–12–6 (1)	Oakland Billy Smith	PTS	12	Oct 23, 1946	32 years, 314 days	Auditorium, Oakland, California, U.S.	For USA California state light heavyweight title
100	Win	82–12–5 (1)	Jimmy O'Brien	TKO	2 (10)	Sep 9, 1946	32 years, 270 days	Coliseum, Baltimore, Maryland, U.S.	
99	Win	81–12–5 (1)	Buddy Walker	KO	4 (10)	Aug 19, 1946	32 years, 249 days	Coliseum, Baltimore, Maryland, U.S.	
98	Loss	80–12–5 (1)	Ezzard Charles	UD	10	May 20, 1946	32 years, 158 days	Forbes Field, Pittsburgh, Pennsylvania, U.S.	
97	Win	80–11–5 (1)	Vern Escoe	TKO	7 (10)	May 2, 1946	32 years, 140 days	Armory, Orange, New Jersey, U.S.	
96	Win	79–11–5 (1)	George Parks	KO	1 (10)	Feb 5, 1946	32 years, 54 days	Turner's Arena, Washington, D.C., U.S.	
95	Win	78–11–5 (1)	Curtis Sheppard	UD	12	Jan 28, 1946	32 years, 46 days	Coliseum, Baltimore, Maryland, U.S.	
94	Win	77–11–5 (1)	Colion Chaney	KO	5 (10)	Dec 13, 1945	32 years, 0 days	Kiel Auditorium, Saint Louis, Missouri, U.S.	
93	Win	76–11–5 (1)	Holman Williams	TKO	11 (12)	Nov 26, 1945	31 years, 348 days	Coliseum, Baltimore, Maryland, U.S.	
92	Win	75–11–5 (1)	O'Dell Riley	KO	6 (10)	Nov 12, 1945	31 years, 334 days	Arena Gardens, Detroit, Michigan, U.S.	
91	Loss	74–11–5 (1)	Holman Williams	MD	10	Oct 22, 1945	31 years, 313 days	Coliseum, Baltimore, Maryland, U.S.	
90	Win	74–10–5 (1)	Cocoa Kid	KO	8 (10)	Sep 17, 1945	31 years, 278 days	Coliseum, Baltimore, Maryland, U.S.	
89	Loss	73–10–5 (1)	Jimmy Bivins	KO	6 (10)	Aug 22, 1945	31 years, 252 days	Lakefront Stadium, Cleveland, Ohio, U.S.	
88	Win	73–9–5 (1)	Lloyd Marshall	TKO	10 (10)	Jun 26, 1945	31 years, 195 days	Lakefront Stadium, Cleveland, Ohio, U.S.	
87	Win	72–9–5 (1)	George Kochan	TKO	6 (10)	Jun 18, 1945	31 years, 187 days	Coliseum, Baltimore, Maryland, U.S.	
86	Win	71–9–5 (1)	Lloyd Marshall	UD	10	May 21, 1945	31 years, 159 days	Coliseum, Baltimore, Maryland, U.S.	
85	Win	70–9–5 (1)	Teddy Randolph	TKO	9 (10)	Apr 23, 1945	31 years, 131 days	Coliseum, Baltimore, Maryland, U.S.	
84	Win	69–9–5 (1)	Nate Bolden	UD	10	Apr 2, 1945	31 years, 110 days	Coliseum, Baltimore, Maryland, U.S.	
83	Win	68–9–5 (1)	Napoleon Mitchell	KO	6 (8)	Feb 12, 1945	31 years, 61 days	Arena, Boston, Massachusetts, U.S.	
82	Win	67–9–5 (1)	Bob Jacobs	TKO	9 (10)	Jan 29, 1945	31 years, 47 days	St. Nicholas Arena, New York City, New York, U.S.	
81	Win	66–9–5 (1)	Joey Jones	TKO	2 (8)	Jan 11, 1945	31 years, 29 days	Mechanics Building, Boston, Massachusetts, U.S.	
80	Win	65–9–5 (1)	Nate Bolden	UD	10	Dec 18, 1944	31 years, 5 days	St. Nicholas Arena, New York City, New York, U.S.	
79	Win	64–9–5 (1)	Battling Monroe	KO	6 (10)	Sep 1, 1944	30 years, 263 days	Coliseum, San Diego, California, U.S.	
78	Win	63–9–5 (1)	Jimmy Hayden	KO	5 (10)	Aug 18, 1944	30 years, 249 days	Coliseum, San Diego, California, U.S.	
77	Win	62–9–5 (1)	Lloyd Kip Mays	KO	3 (10)	Aug 11, 1944	30 years, 242 days	Coliseum, San Diego, California, U.S.	
76	Win	61–9–5 (1)	Kenny LaSalle	PTS	10	May 19, 1944	30 years, 158 days	Coliseum, San Diego, California, U.S.	
75	Loss	60–9–5 (1)	Charley Burley	PTS	10	Apr 21, 1944	30 years, 130 days	Legion Stadium, Hollywood, California, U.S.	
74	Win	60–8–5 (1)	Roman Starr	TKO	2 (10)	Mar 24, 1944	30 years, 102 days	Legion Stadium, Hollywood, California, U.S.	
73	Loss	59–8–5 (1)	Eddie Booker	TKO	8 (10)	Jan 21, 1944	30 years, 39 days	Legion Stadium, Hollywood, California, U.S.	
72	Win	59–7–5 (1)	Amado Rodriguez	KO	1 (10)	Jan 7, 1944	30 years, 25 days	Coliseum, San Diego, California, U.S.	
71	Win	58–7–5 (1)	Jack Chase	MD	10	Nov 26, 1943	29 years, 348 days	Legion Stadium, Hollywood, California, U.S.	
70	Win	57–7–5 (1)	Kid Hermosillo	TKO	5 (10)	Nov 4, 1943	29 years, 326 days	Glacier Gardens, San Diego, California, U.S.	
69	Loss	56–7–5 (1)	Aaron Wade	PTS	10	Aug 16, 1943	29 years, 246 days	Coliseum Bowl, San Francisco, California, U.S.	
68	Loss	56–6–5 (1)	Jack Chase	UD	15	Aug 2, 1943	29 years, 232 days	Civic Auditorium, San Francisco, California, U.S.	Lost California state middleweight title
67	Win	56–5–5 (1)	Eddie Cerda	KO	3 (10)	Jul 28, 1943	29 years, 227 days	Lane Field, San Diego, California, U.S.	
66	Win	55–5–5 (1)	Big Boy Hogue	TKO	5 (10)	Jul 22, 1943	29 years, 221 days	Lane Field, San Diego, California, U.S.	
65	Win	54–5–5 (1)	Jack Chase	UD	15	May 8, 1943	29 years, 146 days	Lane Field, San Diego, California, U.S.	Won California state middleweight title
64	Draw	53–5–5 (1)	Eddie Booker	PTS	12	Dec 11, 1942	28 years, 363 days	Coliseum, San Diego, California, U.S.	For California state middleweight title
63	Win	53–5–4 (1)	Jack Chase	UD	10	Nov 27, 1942	28 years, 349 days	Coliseum, San Diego, California, U.S.	
62	Win	52–5–4 (1)	Tabby Romero	KO	2 (10)	Nov 6, 1942	28 years, 328 days	Coliseum, San Diego, California, U.S.	
61	Win	51–5–4 (1)	Shorty Hogue	TKO	2 (10)	Oct 30, 1942	28 years, 321 days	Coliseum, San Diego, California, U.S.	
60	Win	50–5–4 (1)	Jimmy Casino	TKO	5 (10)	Mar 18, 1942	28 years, 95 days	Auditorium, Oakland, California, U.S.	
59	Win	49–5–4 (1)	Al Globe	TKO	2 (10)	Feb 27, 1942	28 years, 76 days	Coliseum, San Diego, California, U.S.	
58	Win	48–5–4 (1)	Bobby Britt	KO	3 (10)	Jan 28, 1942	28 years, 46 days	Legion Arena, Phoenix, Arizona, U.S.	
57	Draw	47–5–4 (1)	Eddie Booker	PTS	10	Feb 20, 1941	27 years, 69 days	Coliseum, San Diego, California, U.S.	
56	Loss	47–5–3 (1)	Shorty Hogue	PTS	10	Jan 31, 1941	27 years, 49 days	Coliseum, San Diego, California, U.S.	
55	Win	47–4–3 (1)	Clay Rowan	KO	1 (10)	Jan 17, 1941	27 years, 35 days	Coliseum, San Diego, California, U.S.	
54	Win	46–4–3 (1)	Pancho Ramirez	TKO	5 (10)	Oct 18, 1940	26 years, 310 days	Coliseum, San Diego, California, U.S.	
53	Win	45–4–3 (1)	Ron Richards	PTS	12	Jul 11, 1940	26 years, 211 days	Sydney Stadium, Sydney, New South Wales, Australia	
52	Win	44–4–3 (1)	Fred Henneberry	TKO	7 (12)	Jun 27, 1940	26 years, 197 days	Sydney Stadium, Sydney, New South Wales, Australia	
51	Win	43–4–3 (1)	Frank Lindsay	KO	4 (12)	May 27, 1940	26 years, 166 days	City Hall, Hobart, Tasmania, Australia	
50	Win	42–4–3 (1)	Joe Delaney	KO	2 (12)	May 18, 1940	26 years, 157 days	Grenfell Street Stadium, Adelaide, South Australia	
49	Win	41–4–3 (1)	Atilio Sabatino	TKO	5 (12)	May 9, 1940	26 years, 148 days	Sydney Stadium, Sydney, New South Wales, Australia	
48	Win	40–4–3 (1)	Ron Richards	TKO	10 (12)	Apr 18, 1940	26 years, 127 days	Sydney Stadium, Sydney, New South Wales, Australia	
47	Win	39–4–3 (1)	Jack McNamee	TKO	4 (12)	Mar 30, 1940	26 years, 108 days	West Melbourne Stadium, Melbourne, Victoria, Australia	
46	Loss	38–4–3 (1)	Shorty Hogue	PTS	6	Dec 29, 1939	26 years, 16 days	Coliseum, San Diego, California, U.S.	
45	Win	38–3–3 (1)	Honeyboy Jones	PTS	10	Dec 7, 1939	25 years, 359 days	Municipal Auditorium, St. Louis, Missouri, U.S.	
44	Win	37–3–3 (1)	Billy Day	KO	1 (10)	Nov 27, 1939	25 years, 349 days	Legion Arena, Phoenix, Arizona, U.S.	
43	Draw	36–3–3 (1)	Freddie Dixon	TD	8 (10)	Nov 13, 1939	25 years, 335 days	Legion Arena, Phoenix, Arizona, U.S.	TD in the 8th round after Dixon was hit low and could not continue. PAC's rules stated that no fighter could win or lose a fight due to a foul.
42	Win	36–3–2 (1)	Bobby Seaman	TKO	7 (10)	Sep 22, 1939	25 years, 283 days	Coliseum, San Diego, California, U.S.	
41	Win	35–3–2 (1)	Jack Coggins	PTS	10	Sep 1, 1939	25 years, 262 days	Coliseum, San Diego, California, U.S.	
40	NC	34–3–2 (1)	Jack Coggins	NC	8 (10)	Jul 21, 1939	25 years, 220 days	Coliseum, San Diego, California, U.S.	Following several warnings to the effect that more action and effort were needed, the referee called it "no contest" in round eight
39	Loss	34–3–2	Teddy Yarosz	UD	10	Apr 20, 1939	25 years, 128 days	Municipal Auditorium, St. Louis, Missouri, U.S.	
38	Win	34–2–2	Marty Simmons	UD	10	Mar 16, 1939	25 years, 93 days	Municipal Auditorium, St. Louis, Missouri, U.S.	
37	Win	33–2–2	Domenico Ceccarelli	KO	1 (10)	Mar 2, 1939	25 years, 79 days	Coliseum, St. Louis, Missouri, U.S.	
36	Win	32–2–2	Jack Moran	KO	1 (10)	Jan 20, 1939	25 years, 38 days	Coliseum, St. Louis, Missouri, U.S.	
35	Win	31–2–2	Bob Turner	KO	2 (8)	Dec 7, 1938	24 years, 359 days	Arena, St. Louis, Missouri, U.S.	
34	Win	30–2–2	Ray Lyle	KO	2 (10)	Nov 22, 1938	24 years, 344 days	Coliseum, St. Louis, Missouri, U.S.	
33	Win	29–2–2	Bobby Yannes	TKO	2 (10)	Oct 19, 1938	24 years, 310 days	Coliseum, San Diego, California, U.S.	
32	Win	28–2–2	Tom Henry	TKO	4 (6)	Sep 27, 1938	24 years, 288 days	Los Angeles, California, U.S.	
31	Win	27–2–2	Frank Rowsey	TKO	3 (10)	Sep 16, 1938	24 years, 277 days	Coliseum, San Diego, California, U.S.	
30	Win	26–2–2	Johnny Romero	KO	8 (10)	Sep 2, 1938	24 years, 263 days	Coliseum, San Diego, California, U.S.	
29	Win	25–2–2	Lorenzo Pedro	PTS	10	Aug 5, 1938	24 years, 235 days	Lane Field, San Diego, California, U.S.	
28	Win	24–2–2	Johnny Sikes	KO	1 (10)	Jul 22, 1938	24 years, 221 days	Lane Field, San Diego, California, U.S.	
27	Loss	23–2–2	Johnny Romero	PTS	10	Jun 24, 1938	24 years, 193 days	Lane Field, San Diego, California, U.S.	
26	Win	23–1–2	Ray Vargas	KO	3 (10)	May 27, 1938	24 years, 165 days	Lane Field, San Diego, California, U.S.	
25	Win	22–1–2	Jimmy Brent	KO	1 (6)	May 20, 1938	24 years, 158 days	Lane Field, San Diego, California, U.S.	
24	Win	21–1–2	Karl Lautenschlager	TKO	2 (5)	Jan 7, 1938	24 years, 25 days	Coliseum, St. Louis, Missouri, U.S.	
23	Win	20–1–2	Sammy Jackson	KO	8 (10)	Dec 1, 1937	24 years, 4 days	Jackson, Missouri, U.S.	Month & date need verification
22	Win	19–1–2	Sammy Christian	PTS	5	Nov 16, 1937	23 years, 338 days	Municipal Auditorium, Saint Louis, Missouri, U.S.	
21	Win	18–1–2	Chuck Vickers	KO	2 (10)	Nov 9, 1937	23 years, 331 days	Shrine Auditorium, Fort Wayne, Indiana, U.S.	
20	Win	17–1–2	Charley Dawson	TKO	5 (5)	Sep 17, 1937	23 years, 278 days	Municipal Auditorium, Saint Louis, Missouri, U.S.	
19	Win	16–1–2	Sammy Slaughter	PTS	10	Sep 9, 1937	23 years, 270 days	Outdoor Sports Arena, Indianapolis, Indiana, U.S.	
18	Loss	15–1–2	Billy Adams	PTS	8	Sep 1, 1937	23 years, 262 days	Parkway Arena, Cincinnati, Ohio, U.S.	
17	Win	15–0–2	Deacon Logan	KO	3 (5)	Aug 19, 1937	23 years, 249 days	Municipal Auditorium, Saint Louis, Missouri, U.S.	
16	Win	14–0–2	Frank Hatfield	KO	1 (8)	Jul 21, 1937	23 years, 220 days	Parkway Arena, Cincinnati, Ohio, U.S.	
15	Win	13–0–2	Al Dublinsky	KO	3 (?)	Jun 1, 1937	23 years, 170 days	United States of America	Month & date unknown
14	Win	12–0–2	Doty Turner	KO	1 (8)	May 28, 1937	23 years, 166 days	Armory, Benton Harbor, Michigan, U.S.	
13	Win	11–0–2	Carl Martin	RTD	1 (8)	Apr 23, 1937	23 years, 131 days	Armory, Indianapolis, Indiana, U.S.	
12	Win	10–0–2	Charley Dawson	PTS	8	Apr 9, 1937	23 years, 117 days	Armory, Indianapolis, Indiana, U.S.	
11	Win	9–0–2	Ham Pounder	KO	2 (8)	Mar 23, 1937	23 years, 100 days	Ponca City, Oklahoma, U.S.	
10	Win	8–0–2	Joe Huff	KO	3 (5)	Feb 2, 1937	23 years, 51 days	Coliseum, St. Louis, Missouri, U.S.	
9	Draw	7–0–2	Sammy Jackson	PTS	8	Jan 29, 1937	23 years, 47 days	Quincy, Illinois, U.S.	
8	Win	7–0–1	Johnny Davis	KO	4 (8)	Jan 18, 1937	23 years, 36 days	Eagles Hall, Quincy, Illinois, U.S.	
7	Win	6–0–1	Mack Payne	KO	1 (8)	Jan 5, 1937	23 years, 23 days	Coliseum, St. Louis, Missouri, U.S.	
6	Win	5–0–1	Sammy Jackson	PTS	5	Oct 9, 1936	22 years, 301 days	Coliseum, St. Louis, Missouri, U.S.	
5	Win	4–0–1	Murray Allen	KO	2 (6)	Sep 30, 1936	22 years, 292 days	Hi-Life Garden, Keokuk, Iowa, U.S.	
4	Draw	3–0–1	Sammy Christian	PTS	6	Aug 4, 1936	22 years, 235 days	Quincy, Illinois, U.S.	
3	Win	3–0	Murray Allen	PTS	6	Jul 14, 1936	22 years, 214 days	Eagles Hall, Quincy, Illinois, U.S.	
2	Win	2–0	Kid Pocahuntas	KO	3 (8)	Jan 1, 1936	22 years, 19 days	Hot Springs, Arkansas, U.S.	
1	Win	1–0	Billy Simms	KO	2 (4)	Sep 3, 1935	21 years, 264 days	Poplar Bluff, Missouri, U.S.	

== Titles in boxing ==
=== Major world titles ===
- NYSAC light heavyweight champion (175 lbs)
- NBA (WBA) light heavyweight champion (175 lbs)

=== The Ring magazine titles ===
- The Ring light heavyweight champion (175 lbs)

=== Regional/International titles ===
- California State middleweight champion (160 lbs)
- California State light heavyweight champion (175 lbs)

=== Undisputed titles ===
- Undisputed light heavyweight champion

=== Honorary titles ===
- World heavyweight champion of Nevada (Note: His fight against Niño Valdés on May 2, 1955 was billed as for the "World Heavyweight Championship of Nevada" by promoter Jack "Doc" Kearns, but likely not even recognized by the Nevada State Athletic Commission itself.)
- American heavyweight champion (Note: His fight against Willi Besmanoff on May 25, 1960 was promoted as for the "American Heavyweight Title"; There are no records of it being an actual sanctioned title bout.)

== See also ==
- List of light heavyweight boxing champions

== Notes and references ==
=== References ===
Achievements
Preceded by Joey Maxim	World Light Heavyweight Champion; 17 December 1952 – 12 May 1962; Abandons title	Succeeded by Harold Johnson
Records
Preceded by Bob Fitzsimmons	Oldest Light Heavyweight World Champion; December 17, 1952 – April 18, 2013	Succeeded by Bernard Hopkins
