= Abel Cestac =

Argentine boxer

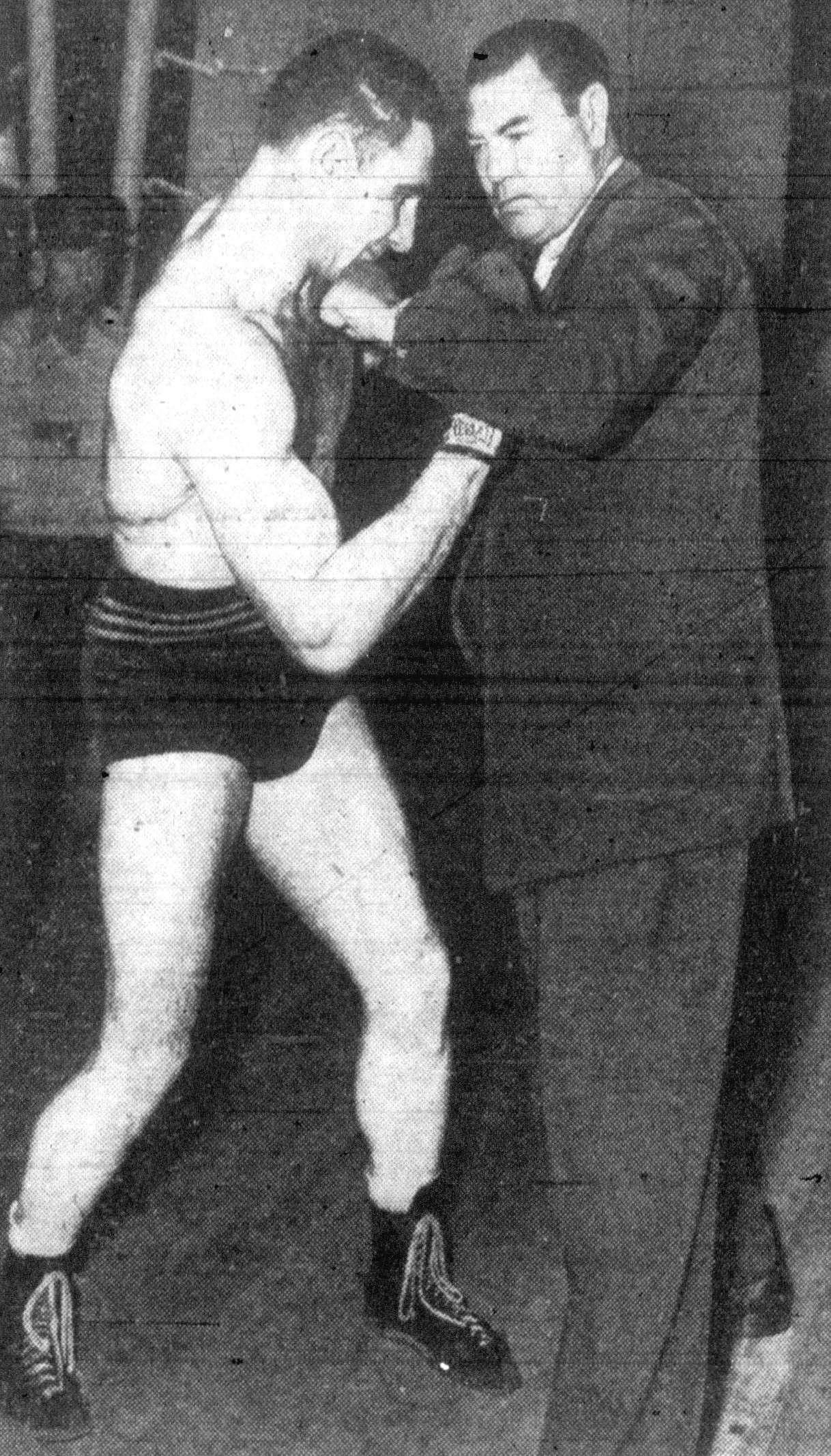
- Cestac (left) with his manager Jack Dempsey (right), circa 1950.
- Born: Abel Evaristo Cestac; 25 August 1918
- Died: 16 January 1995 (aged 76)
- Nationality: Argentina
- Height: 193 cm (6 ft 4 in)
- Fighting out of: Bellocq - Carlos Casares - Buenos Aires
- Trainer: Whitey Bimstein
- Years active: 1945-1951

Professional boxing record
- Total: 56
- Wins: 39
- By knockout: 33
- Losses: 14
- By knockout: 3
- Draws: 3

Other information
- Boxing record from BoxRec

Abel Evaristo Cestac (25 August 1918 – 16 January 1995) was an Argentine boxer.

Cestac was an amateur boxer when he was discovered by Luis Angel Firpo in July 1940. According to Firpo, he came across Cestac fighting a steer because he could not find any men his equal in strength. Firpo predicted that Cestac would be world heavyweight champion within three years. Jack Dempsey and Luis Ángel Firpo agreed to jointly manage Cestac. When he came to New York in July 1945, the journalist Horacio Estol acted as his representative. On 27 July 1945 he fought John Thomas at Madison Square Gardens, losing on the split decision after ten rounds.

Despite the initial setback, he went on to win 39 professional fights, with 14 losses and three draws. Abel Cestac became the South American heavyweight champion. In March 1951 he came to Toledo, Ohio to fight Archie Moore, who was forty pounds lighter. However, Moore defeated him in ten rounds on a unanimous decision. In June 1951, Moore came to Buenos Aires for a return match, again defeating Cestac, who retired in the tenth round. Cestac fought twice more, being defeated by Arturo Godoy in August 1951 and by Cesar Brion in November 1951. After this he retired from the ring.
