= Leonard Morrow =

American boxer

Personal information
- Nickname: The California Kid
- Born: Leonard Delano Morrow; February 12, 1926 Kiowa, Oklahoma, US
- Died: August 2, 2000 (aged 74)
- Weight: Light heavyweight; Heavyweight

Boxing career
- Stance: Orthodox

Boxing record
- Total fights: 39
- Wins: 30
- Win by KO: 19
- Losses: 8
- Draws: 1

Leonard Morrow (February 12, 1926– August 2, 2000) was an American professional boxer in the light heavyweight and heavyweight divisions, who was active from 1946 to 1954. He was ranked as a top contender in the light heavyweight division from 1948 to 1950. In 1948, he was the number two rated contender by The Ring (magazine) for Freddie Mills' light heavyweight world title. During his career, he defeated hall of fame fighters, champions, and top contenders such as Archie Moore, Jimmy Bivins, Bert Lytell, and Arturo Godoy. In 1989, Archie went on record saying that Morrow was one of only three men that ever really hit him alongside Rocky Marciano and Yvon Durelle.

== Amateur career ==
Leonard got his start in boxing under the tutelage of the former two-time welterweight champion, Young Jack Thompson. He would train under Thompson's instruction from his start in 1945 until his untimely death due to a heart attack at 41 years old in 1946. After Thompson's death, Leonard fought his last two amateur fights before making the transition into the professional ranks, winning one and losing one.

== Professional career ==
Morrow made his professional debut on October 30, 1946, at the Auditorium in Oakland, California with a 4-round PTS victory over Allen Arnett. His next two bouts came against rugged veteran, Gil Mojica in March 1947. Leonard lost the first fight, which took place on March 5, via PTS in 6 rounds and subsequently lost again two weeks later via TKO in 2 rounds of a scheduled 4. Between April 23, 1947, and September 1, 1948, Morrow went undefeated in 15 fights, drawing one against Dee Edwards. During this unbeaten streak, he fought Mojica two more times avenging his losses with two victories PTS 6 and TKO 4 (8).

=== Upsetting Bert Lytell ===
On February 11, 1948, Morrow won a controversial 10 round split decision upset over the ring magazine number two ranked middleweight contender and black murderer's row member, Bert Lytell. In the first 6 rounds, the fight was fought fast and even until Morrow knocked down Lytell for a count of two in the sixth round. Lytell would close strong, decisively winning the last four rounds as Leonard's stamina rapidly drained, but it was only enough for one of the judges to score the fight in his favor. Bert Lytell's manager filed an immediate protest of the decision to the athletic commission, but to no avail.

=== California State Light Heavyweight Title ===
Leonard Morrow's next bout against Archie Moore would turn out to be the defining fight of his career. Despite his stunning upset win against Lytell, the 12–2–1 (6KO) prospect was thought to be over matched up against the experienced ring veteran in Archie Moore who held a record of 92–14–7 (1NC) (69KO) and the California State light heavyweight title. This bout would be Moore's first title defense of his state championship after he had out pointed Bobby Zander for the vacant title in the previous year. Scheduled for 12 rounds, on June 2, 1948, Leonard Morrow upset the odds for a second time in a row when, in the first round, after getting hit with a few clean jabs, he dropped Moore three times, winning the bout after two minutes and fifty one seconds of the opening stanza.

Morrow would not go on to defend his newly won state title in his career. After defeating Archie Moore, he knocked out Fitzie Fitzpatrick twice, before Bob Foxworth bruised and beat Morrow in 4 rounds of a scheduled 10 in September 1948. Morrow rebounded with two victories from March to April before knocking out Oakland Billy Smith in 3 rounds of a 10-round fight.

== Professional boxing record ==
39 fights	30 wins	8 losses
By knockout	19	4
By decision	11	4
Draws	1	

No.	Result	Record	Opponent	Type	Round, time	Date	Location	Notes
39	Loss	30–8–1	Billy Gilliam	PTS	10	Feb 11, 1954	Winterland Arena, San Francisco, California, US	
38	Win	30–7–1	Willie Bean	PTS	10	Dec 7, 1953	Winterland Arena, San Francisco, California, US	
37	Win	29–7–1	Frank Buford	TKO	4 (10)	Jun 15, 1953	Coliseum Bowl, San Francisco, California, US	
36	Win	28–7–1	'Young' Harry Wills	PTS	10	Jun 6, 1953	Municipal Auditorium, Eureka, California, US	
35	Win	27–7–1	Abel Fernandez	TKO	8 (10), 2:52	Mar 17, 1953	Olympic Auditorium, Los Angeles, California, US	
34	Win	26–7–1	Sonny Andrews	UD	10	Feb 10, 1953	Olympic Auditorium, Los Angeles, California, US	
33	Win	25–7–1	Junior Payne	TKO	2 (10), 2:26	Dec 2, 1952	Auditorium, Richmond, California, US	
32	Loss	24–7–1	Harold Johnson	KO	3 (10), 1:55	Sep 16, 1952	Arena, Toledo, Ohio, US	
31	Win	24–6–1	Sonny Andrews	TKO	5 (10), 2:50	Jun 9, 1952	Sports Center, Tucson, Arizona, US	
30	Win	23–6–1	Ralph K.O. Hooker	TKO	3 (8)	May 19, 1952	Pacific Livestock Pavilion, Portland, Oregon, US	
29	Loss	22–6–1	Colion Chaney	UD	10	Jun 12, 1951	Last Frontier Sportsdrome, Las Vegas, Nevada, US	
28	Win	22–5–1	Ralph K.O. Hooker	RTD	3 (10), 3:00	Jun 4, 1951	Sports Center, Tucson, Arizona, US	
27	Loss	21–5–1	Archie Moore	KO	10 (15), 0:30	Dec 13, 1949	Sports Arena, Toledo, Ohio, US	
26	Loss	21–4–1	Jimmy Bivins	UD	10	Jul 5, 1949	Auditorium, Oakland, California, US	
25	Win	21–3–1	Arturo Godoy	TKO	10 (10)	Aug 16, 1949	Civic Auditorium, San Francisco, California, US	
24	Win	20–3–1	Johnny Flynn	PTS	10	Jul 25, 1949	Civic Auditorium, San Francisco, California, US	
23	Win	19–3–1	Jimmy Bivins	UD	10	Jul 5, 1949	Olympic Auditorium, Los Angeles, California, US	
22	Win	18–3–1	Oakland Billy Smith	TKO	3 (10), 2:31	May 4, 1949	Auditorium, Oakland, California, US	
21	Win	17–3–1	Watson Jones	TKO	8 (10), 2:38	Apr 5, 1949	Olympic Auditorium, Los Angeles, California, US	
20	Win	16–3–1	John Donnelly	KO	8 (10)	Mar 23, 1949	Auditorium, Oakland, California, US	
19	Loss	15–3–1	Bob Foxworth	TKO	4 (10)	Sep 1, 1948	Auditorium, Oakland, California, US	
18	Win	15–2–1	Fitzie Fitzpatrick	KO	2 (10), 2:50	Aug 17, 1948	Olympic Auditorium, Los Angeles, California, US	
17	Win	14–2–1	Fitzie Fitzpatrick	KO	5 (10), 1:01	Jul 13, 1948	Olympic Auditorium, Los Angeles, California, US	
16	Win	13–2–1	Archie Moore	KO	1 (12), 2:51	Jun 2, 1948	Auditorium, Oakland, California, US	Won California State light heavyweight title
15	Win	12–2–1	Bert Lytell	SD	10	Feb 11, 1948	Auditorium, Oakland, California, US	
14	Win	11–2–1	Al Spaulding	UD	10	Jan 14, 1948	Auditorium, Oakland, California, US	
13	Win	10–2–1	John Donnelly	PTS	10	Dec 17, 1947	Auditorium, Oakland, California, US	
12	Win	9–2–1	John Harding	TKO	2 (6)	Nov 19, 1947	Auditorium, Oakland, California, US	
11	Win	8–2–1	George Evans	TKO	1 (6)	Oct 29, 1947	Auditorium, Oakland, California, US	
10	Win	7–2–1	Gil Mojica	TKO	4 (10)	Oct 8, 1947	Auditorium, Oakland, California, US	
9	Win	6–2–1	Paulie Peters	TKO	6 (10)	Jun 27, 1947	National Hall, San Francisco, California, US	
8	Win	5–2–1	Gil Mojica	PTS	4	Jun 16, 1947	Civic Auditorium, San Francisco, California, US	
7	Win	4–2–1	Allen Arnett	PTS	4	Jun 4, 1947	Auditorium, Oakland, California, US	
6	Draw	3–2–1	Dee Edwards	PTS	4	May 21, 1947	Oaks Ballpark, Emeryville, California, US	
5	Win	3–2	Jake Green	KO	1 (4)	May 6, 1947	Ryan's Auditorium, Fresno, California, US	
4	Win	2–2	Eddie Keller	TKO	3 (4)	Apr 23, 1947	Auditorium, Oakland, California, US	
3	Loss	1–2	Gil Mojica	TKO	2 (4)	Mar 19, 1947	Auditorium, Oakland, California, US	
2	Loss	1–1	Gil Mojica	PTS	4	Mar 5, 1947	Auditorium, Oakland, California, US	
1	Win	1–0	Allen Arnett	PTS	4	Oct 30, 1946	Auditorium, Oakland, California, US	
