= Arturo Godoy =

Chilean boxer (1912 –1986)

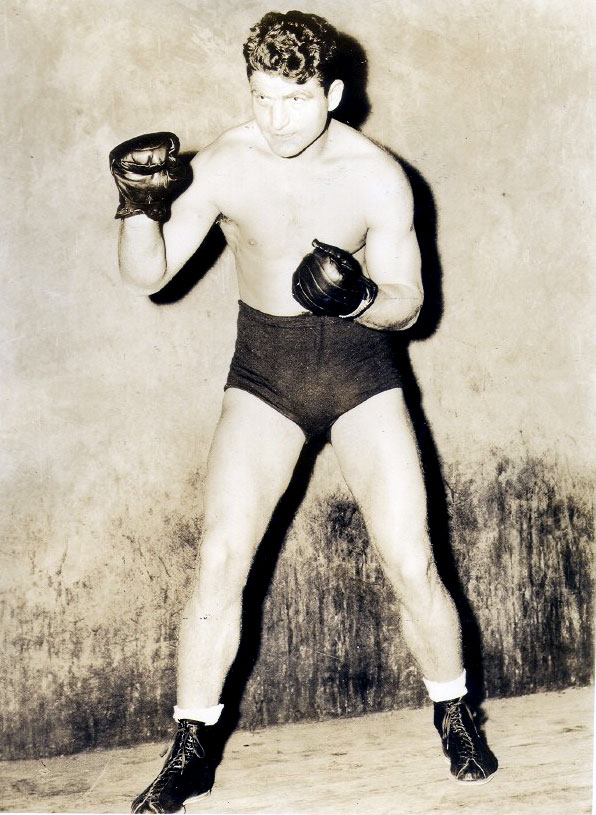

Personal information
- Born: 10 October 1912 Iquique, Chile
- Died: 27 August 1986 (aged 73) Chile
- Weight: Heavyweight

Boxing career
- Stance: Orthodox

Boxing record
- Total fights: 128
- Wins: 92
- Win by KO: 52
- Losses: 22
- Draws: 12
- No contests: 2

Arturo Godoy (October 10, 1912 – 1986) was a Chilean professional boxer, also nicknamed "Arturito".

== Biography ==
He was born in Iquique on October 10, 1912. He was South American Heavyweight Champion and had an extensive and successful career in Argentina, Cuba, Spain, and the United States roughly between 1931 and 1954. In New York, he beat Tony Galento.

He is best known for his two epic fights with Joe Louis for the World Heavyweight Championship in 1940. The first was held at the Madison Square Garden on February 9, 1940, and went the full length of 15 rounds. The 2 ringside judges split their votes and the tie was broken by the referee, who gave it to Louis, to the protest of a substantial part of the audience, who had been won over by the fact that Godoy showed no fear of Louis and by the additional fact that Louis was not able to knock out his opponent after a string of K.O.s and T.K.O.s. South Americans and Chileans in particular thought that Godoy had indeed won the fight and from then on the figure of Godoy acquired mythical proportions. A second fight was scheduled for June 20, 1940. Joe Louis prepared to counteract Godoy's strategy and ring tactics, focusing on bringing him up from his unusual low stance with a combination of hooks to the body and uppercuts. Godoy fought bravely but the referee had to stop the fight in the 8th round. Godoy continued fighting until 1954 and returned to Chile, where he was regarded as a hero.

He died in Chile in 1986.

== Legacy ==
His life was used as the base for the novel "Muriendo por la dulce patria mía" (Laurel Editores, 2017) by Roberto Castillo Sandoval.

== Professional boxing record ==
128 fights	92 wins	22 losses
By knockout	52	3
By decision	39	18
By disqualification	1	1
Draws	12	
No contests	2	

No.	Result	Record	Opponent	Type	Round, time	Date	Location	Notes
128	Draw	92–22–12 (2)	Alfredo Lagay	PTS	10	Nov 2, 1951	Teatro Circo Caupolicán, Santiago de Chile, Chile	
127	Win	92–22–11 (2)	Abel Cestac	PTS	10	Aug 3, 1951	Teatro Circo Caupolicán, Santiago de Chile, Chile	
126	Win	91–22–11 (2)	Mario Abarca	KO	4 (10)	Jun 15, 1951	Teatro Circo Caupolicán, Santiago de Chile, Chile	
125	Win	90–22–11 (2)	Roberto Balbontin	TKO	4 (12)	Jun 30, 1950	Teatro Circo Caupolicán, Santiago de Chile, Chile	Won vacant Chilean heavyweight title
124	Draw	89–22–11 (2)	Karel Sys	PTS	10	Mar 6, 1950	Estadio Ferro Carril Oeste, Buenos Aires, Argentina	
123	Win	89–22–10 (2)	Emilio Espinoza	RTD	5 (10)	Jan 13, 1950	Teatro Circo Caupolicán, Santiago de Chile, Chile	
122	Loss	88–22–10 (2)	Leonard Morrow	TKO	10 (10)	Aug 16, 1949	Civic Auditorium, San Francisco, California, US	
121	Draw	88–21–10 (2)	Maynard Jones	PTS	10	Aug 9, 1949	Wilmington Park, Wilmington, Delaware, US	
120	Win	88–21–9 (2)	Elkins Brothers	SD	10	Jun 27, 1949	Griffith Stadium, Washington, DC, US	
119	Win	87–21–9 (2)	Johnny Haynes	PTS	10	Jun 1, 1949	Zivic Arena, Millvale, Pennsylvania, US	
118	Loss	86–21–9 (2)	Harold Johnson	UD	10	Feb 23, 1949	Convention Hall, Philadelphia, Pennsylvania, US	
117	Loss	86–20–9 (2)	Alabama Kid	UD	10	Aug 17, 1948	Haft's Acre, Columbus, Ohio, US	
116	Win	86–19–9 (2)	Pat Richards	TKO	4 (10), 2:07	Jun 14, 1948	Haft's Acre, Columbus, Ohio, US	
115	Win	85–19–9 (2)	Pat Richards	UD	10	Feb 24, 1948	Memorial Hall, Columbus, Ohio, US	
114	Win	84–19–9 (2)	Jimmy Bell	PTS	8	Jan 20, 1948	Arena, Trenton, New Jersey, US	
113	Win	83–19–9 (2)	Phil Muscato	SD	10	Dec 1, 1947	St. Nicholas Arena, New York City, New York, US	
112	Win	82–19–9 (2)	Jack Marshall	PTS	10	Oct 22, 1947	El Paso, Texas, US	
111	Loss	81–19–9 (2)	Turkey Thompson	UD	10	Oct 7, 1947	Olympic Auditorium, Los Angeles, California, US	
110	Win	81–18–9 (2)	Cyclone Williams	KO	5 (10)	Sep 9, 1947	Troy Arena, Troy, New York, US	
109	Win	80–18–9 (2)	Buddy Knox	KO	1 (?), 0:56	Dec 5, 1946	Denver, Colorado, US	
108	Win	79–18–9 (2)	Tex Boddie	PTS	10	Nov 25, 1946	City Auditorium, Omaha, Nebraska, US	
107	Loss	78–18–9 (2)	Joe Muscato	UD	10	Oct 15, 1946	Memorial Auditorium, Buffalo, New York, US	
106	Win	78–17–9 (2)	Cyclone Williams	SD	10	Aug 21, 1946	Memorial Auditorium, Buffalo, New York, US	
105	Win	77–17–9 (2)	Tony Musto	TKO	6 (10), 2:40	Aug 16, 1946	MacArthur Stadium, Syracuse, New York, US	
104	Win	76–17–9 (2)	Larry Bouchard	KO	2 (?)	Jun 14, 1946	Jacksonville, Florida, US	
103	NC	75–17–9 (2)	Lee Savold	NC	8 (10)	Mar 1, 1946	Chicago Stadium, Chicago, Illinois, US	Fight stopped for excessive clinching
102	Win	75–17–9 (1)	Johnny Haynes	PTS	10	Nov 20, 1945	Olympic Auditorium, Los Angeles, California, US	
101	Win	74–17–9 (1)	Louis Long	TKO	7 (10)	Nov 5, 1945	Coliseum, Baltimore, Maryland, US	
100	Win	73–17–9 (1)	Jimmy Carollo	TKO	1 (10)	Sep 28, 1945	Norfolk, Virginia, US	
99	Win	72–17–9 (1)	Dan Merritt	TKO	2 (10), 2:38	Sep 12, 1945	Twin City Bowl, Elizabeth, New Jersey, US	
98	Win	71–17–9 (1)	Buddy Walker	KO	5 (10)	May 14, 1945	Griffith Stadium, Washington, DC, US	
97	Win	70–17–9 (1)	Herb Jones	TKO	2 (10), 2:25	Apr 4, 1945	Ellis Auditorium, Memphis, Tennessee, US	
96	Win	69–17–9 (1)	Johnny Denson	KO	5 (10), 2:35	Mar 27, 1945	Municipal Auditorium, San Antonio, Texas, US	
95	Win	68–17–9 (1)	Larry Bouchard	PTS	10	Mar 1, 1945	U.S.O. Auditorium, Norfolk, Virginia, US	
94	Win	67–17–9 (1)	Juan Urlich	KO	2 (10)	Dec 20, 1944	Teatro Circo Caupolicán, Santiago de Chile, Chile	
93	NC	66–17–9 (1)	Alberto Lovell	NC	11 (12)	Apr 15, 1944	Lima, Peru	South American heavyweight title at stake
92	Win	66–17–9	Fernando Menichelli	KO	7 (?)	Nov 21, 1943	Nuevo Circo, Caracas, Venezuela	
91	Win	65–17–9	Roscoe Toles	PTS	10	Aug 22, 1943	Estadio Chile, Santiago de Chile, Chile	
90	Win	64–17–9	Isidoro Gastanaga	TKO	5 (10)	Jul 18, 1943	La Paz, Bolivia	
89	Win	63–17–9	Fernando Menichelli	TKO	1 (10)	Apr 20, 1943	Teatro Circo Caupolicán, Santiago de Chile, Chile	
88	Win	62–17–9	Alberto Lovell	PTS	12	Feb 28, 1943	Estadio de Carabineros, Santiago de Chile, Chile	Won South American heavyweight title
87	Win	61–17–9	Eduardo Primo	PTS	10	Dec 12, 1942	Ginásio da A.A. São Paulo, Sao Paulo, Brazil	
86	Loss	60–17–9	Roscoe Toles	PTS	10	Nov 14, 1942	Ginásio do Estádio Pacaembu, Sao Paulo, Brazil	
85	Win	60–16–9	Antonio Soares	TKO	1 (10)	Oct 31, 1942	Teatro Casino Antarctica, Sao Paulo, Brazil	
84	Loss	59–16–9	Roscoe Toles	PTS	12	Oct 21, 1942	Estadio Manoel Schwartz, Río de Janeiro, Brazil	
83	Win	59–15–9	Eusebio Ramirez	KO	7 (?)	Sep 12, 1942	Cordoba, Argentina	
82	Draw	58–15–9	Roscoe Toles	PTS	12	Jul 10, 1942	Teatro Circo Caupolicán, Santiago de Chile, Chile	
81	Win	58–15–8	Hans Havlicek	KO	3 (12)	Jun 6, 1942	Salta, Argentina	
80	Loss	57–15–8	Roscoe Toles	PTS	12	Mar 7, 1942	Estadio Luna Park, Buenos Aires, Argentina	
79	Loss	57–14–8	Alberto Lovell	PTS	12	Jan 17, 1942	Estadio Luna Park, Buenos Aires, Argentina	For South American heavyweight title
78	Draw	57–13–8	Roscoe Toles	PTS	12	Nov 1, 1941	Buenos Aires, Argentina	
77	Win	57–13–7	Ernesto Carnesse	PTS	10	Sep 27, 1941	Teatro Circo Caupolicán, Santiago de Chile, Argentina	
76	Loss	56–13–7	Alberto Lovell	PTS	12	May 17, 1941	Estadio Luna Park, Buenos Aires, Argentina	For South American heavyweight title
75	Win	56–12–7	Tony Musto	PTS	10	Dec 2, 1940	Arena, Cleveland, Ohio, US	
74	Win	55–12–7	Gus Dorazio	UD	10	Oct 7, 1940	Arena, Philadelphia, Pennsylvania, US	
73	Loss	54–12–7	Joe Louis	TKO	8 (15), 1:24	Jun 20, 1940	Yankee Stadium, New York City, New York, US	For NYSAC, NBA, and The Ring heavyweight titles
72	Loss	54–11–7	Joe Louis	SD	15	Feb 9, 1940	Madison Square Garden, New York City, New York, US	For NYSAC, NBA, and The Ring heavyweight titles
71	Loss	54–10–7	Eduardo Primo	DQ	8 (12)	Aug 19, 1939	Estadio Luna Park, Buenos Aires, Argentina	Lost South American heavyweight title; Primo DQ'd for hitting low
70	Win	54–9–7	Valentin Campolo	PTS	12	Jul 22, 1939	Estadio Luna Park, Buenos Aires, Argentina	Retained South American heavyweight title
69	Win	53–9–7	Alberto Lovell	PTS	12	Apr 8, 1939	Estadio Luna Park, Buenos Aires, Argentina	Won South American heavyweight title
68	Loss	52–9–7	Valentin Campolo	PTS	12	Mar 4, 1939	Estadio Luna Park, Buenos Aires, Argentina	
67	Win	52–8–7	Eusebio Ramirez	KO	3 (12)	Jan 28, 1939	Ciudad Mendoza, Argentina	
66	Win	51–8–7	Hans Birkie	PTS	10	Dec 18, 1938	Buenos Aires, Argentina	
65	Win	50–8–7	Hans Havlicek	TKO	2 (10)	Nov 26, 1938	Estadio Luna Park, Buenos Aires, Argentina	
64	Loss	49–8–7	Alberto Lovell	PTS	12	Jul 23, 1938	Estadio Luna Park, Buenos Aires, Argentina	
63	Win	49–7–7	Valentin Campolo	PTS	12	Jun 18, 1938	Estadio Luna Park, Buenos Aires, Argentina	
62	Win	48–7–7	Dionisio Cristante	KO	1 (10)	Jun 3, 1938	Teatro Mitre, Montevideo, Uruguay	
61	Win	47–7–7	Eddie Mader	TKO	5 (10)	Nov 9, 1937	Broadway Arena, New York City, New York, US	
60	Loss	46–7–7	Nathan Mann	PTS	10	Oct 8, 1937	Hippodrome, New York City, New York, US	
59	Draw	46–6–7	Roscoe Toles	PTS	10	Aug 4, 1937	University of Detroit Stadium, Detroit, Michigan, US	
58	Win	46–6–6	Tony Galento	PTS	6	Jun 22, 1937	Comiskey Park, Chicago, Illinois, US	
57	Loss	45–6–6	Roscoe Toles	PTS	10	May 21, 1937	Olympia Stadium, Detroit, Michigan, US	
56	Win	45–5–6	Tony Galento	PTS	10	Apr 28, 1937	Hippodrome, New York City, New York, US	
55	Draw	44–5–6	Maurice Strickland	PTS	10	Mar 10, 1937	Hippodrome, New York City, New York, US	
54	Win	44–5–5	Art Sykes	KO	3 (8)	Feb 25, 1937	Star Casino, New York City, New York, US	
53	Win	43–5–5	Otis Thomas	TKO	3 (10)	Feb 3, 1937	Hippodrome, New York City, New York, US	
52	Win	42–5–5	Jack Roper	KO	7 (10)	Jan 14, 1937	Star Casino, New York City, New York, US	
51	Draw	41–5–5	Al Ettore	PTS	10	Nov 11, 1936	Hippodrome, New York City, New York, US	
50	Draw	41–5–4	Leroy Haynes	PTS	10	Oct 21, 1936	Hippodrome, New York City, New York, US	
49	Win	41–5–3	Luis Ángel Firpo	RTD	3 (12)	Jul 11, 1936	Estadio Luna Park, Buenos Aires, Argentina	
48	Win	40–5–3	Vincenz Hower	TKO	10 (12)	Dec 21, 1935	Estadio Luna Park, Buenos Aires, Argentina	
47	Win	39–5–3	Eduardo Primo	PTS	12	Dec 7, 1935	Estadio Luna Park, Buenos Aires, Argentina	
46	Win	38–5–3	Oscar Davidson	KO	1 (10)	Sep 7, 1935	Estadio Brasil, Río de Janeiro, Brazil	
45	Draw	37–5–3	Eduardo Primo	PTS	12	Jul 13, 1935	Estadio Luna Park, Buenos Aires, Argentina	
44	Win	37–5–2	Antonio Sebastiao	TKO	3 (10)	May 18, 1935	Estadio Brasil, Río de Janeiro, Brazil	
43	Win	36–5–2	Tommy Loughran	PTS	10	Mar 17, 1935	Campos de Sports de Ñuñoa, Santiago de Chile, Argentina	
42	Loss	35–5–2	Tommy Loughran	UD	12	Jan 5, 1935	Estadio Luna Park, Buenos Aires, Argentina	
41	Win	35–4–2	Jose Carattoli	PTS	12	Nov 24, 1934	Estadio Luna Park, Buenos Aires, Argentina	
40	Draw	34–4–2	Tommy Loughran	PTS	12	Oct 20, 1934	Estadio Luna Park, Buenos Aires, Argentina	
39	Win	34–4–1	Eduardo Primo	PTS	12	Sep 29, 1934	Estadio Luna Park, Buenos Aires, Argentina	
38	Loss	33–4–1	Billy Jones	PTS	10	Aug 12, 1934	Stadium Nacional, Santiago de Chile, Chile	
37	Win	33–3–1	Erwin Klausner	PTS	10	Jun 24, 1934	Stadium Nacional, Santiago de Chile, Chile	
36	Win	32–3–1	Erwin Klausner	PTS	12	Apr 22, 1934	Campos de Sports de Ñuñoa, Santiago de Chile, Chile	
35	Loss	31–3–1	Victorio Campolo	PTS	12	Mar 1, 1934	Buenos Aires, Argentina	
34	Win	31–2–1	Esteban Senestraro	TKO	6 (12)	Jan 20, 1934	Club Atletico River Plate, Buenos Aires, Argentina	
33	Win	30–2–1	Mario Lenzi	KO	2 (12)	Jan 5, 1934	Club Atletico River Plate, Buenos Aires, Argentina	
32	Win	29–2–1	Salvatore Zaetta	KO	3 (?)	Dec 6, 1933	Buenos Aires, Argentina	
31	Win	28–2–1	Vicente Parrile	PTS	10	Aug 23, 1933	Plaza de Toros de Las Arenas, Barcelona, Spain	
30	Win	27–2–1	Mateo de la Osa	TKO	7 (10)	Jul 26, 1933	Teatro Circo Olympia, Barcelona, Spain	
29	Win	26–2–1	Raul Bianchi	KO	2 (10)	Jul 1, 1933	Plaza de Toros Monumental, Barcelona, Spain	
28	Win	25–2–1	Rafaele Siciliano	KO	2 (10)	Jun 14, 1933	Teatro Circo Olympia, Barcelona, Spain	
27	Win	24–2–1	Santiago Sola	PTS	10	May 31, 1933	Teatro Circo Olympia, Barcelona, Spain	
26	Win	23–2–1	Jesus Rodriguez	KO	2 (10)	May 9, 1933	Teatro Circo Olympia, Barcelona, Spain	
25	Win	22–2–1	Angel Roman	KO	1 (10)	May 2, 1933	Teatro Circo Olympia, Barcelona, Spain	
24	Win	21–2–1	'Young' John Herrera	PTS	10	Apr 1, 1933	Arena Cristal, Havana, Cuba	
23	Win	20–2–1	Frank Cawley	PTS	10	Feb 27, 1933	Biscayne Arena, Miami, Florida, US	
22	Win	19–2–1	Pantaleon Musolino	KO	2 (?)	Feb 25, 1933	Havana, Cuba	
21	Win	18–2–1	Rufino Alvarez	KO	5 (?)	Feb 4, 1933	Havana, Cuba	
20	Win	17–2–1	Dewey Kimrey	TKO	5 (10)	Jan 24, 1933	Legion Arena, West Palm Beach, Florida, US	
19	Loss	16–2–1	Frankie Edgren	PTS	10	Jan 10, 1933	Legion Arena, West Palm Beach, Florida, US	
18	Win	16–1–1	Chick Raines	RTD	5 (10)	Dec 6, 1932	Legion Arena, West Palm Beach, Florida, US	
17	Win	15–1–1	Johnny Mack	TKO	5 (10)	Nov 21, 1932	Biscayne Arena, Miami, Florida, US	
16	Win	14–1–1	Frankie Palmo	TKO	10 (10), 2:50	Nov 11, 1932	Legion Arena, West Palm Beach, Florida, US	
15	Win	13–1–1	Tony Ferrante	KO	1 (10)	Oct 31, 1932	Biscayne Arena, Miami, Florida, US	
14	Win	12–1–1	Joe King	TKO	5 (10)	Oct 21, 1932	Benjamin Field Arena, Tampa, Florida, US	
13	Win	11–1–1	Irving Ashkenazy	TKO	5 (10)	Oct 7, 1932	Benjamin Field Arena, Tampa, Florida, US	
12	Win	10–1–1	Cyclone Smith	PTS	10	Sep 26, 1932	Biscayne Arena, Miami, Florida, US	
11	Win	9–1–1	Ben Logan	KO	2 (10)	Sep 12, 1932	Biscayne Arena, Miami, Florida, US	
10	Win	8–1–1	Gordon Fortenberry	PTS	10	Aug 22, 1932	Biscayne Arena, Miami, Florida, US	
9	Win	7–1–1	Ray Swanson	KO	7 (10)	Aug 1, 1932	Biscayne Arena, Miami, Florida, US	
8	Draw	6–1–1	Pedro Proenza	PTS	10	Jul 16, 1932	Viejo Fronton, Havana, Cuba	
7	Win	6–1	Antonio Hevia	PTS	10	Jul 2, 1932	Miramar Garden, Havana, Cuba	
6	Win	5–1	Pantaleon Musolino	DQ	2 (10)	Jun 25, 1932	Havana, Cuba	Musolino DQ'd for headbutting and biting
5	Win	4–1	Luis Aravena	PTS	8	Dec 6, 1931	Campos de Sports de Ñuñoa, Santiago de Chile, Chile	
4	Win	3–1	Peter Johnson	PTS	10	Jun 14, 1931	Stadium Nacional, Santiago de Chile, Chile	
3	Win	2–1	Oscar Ramirez	KO	2 (6)	May 30, 1931	Stadium Nacional, Santiago de Chile, Chile	
2	Loss	1–1	Luis Aravena	KO	? (10)	Mar 7, 1931	Coliseo Popular, Valparaiso, Chile	
1	Win	1–0	Peter Johnson	PTS	6	Dec 21, 1930	Pabellón Nacional, Santiago de Chile, Chile	
