= Eddie Cotton =

American boxer

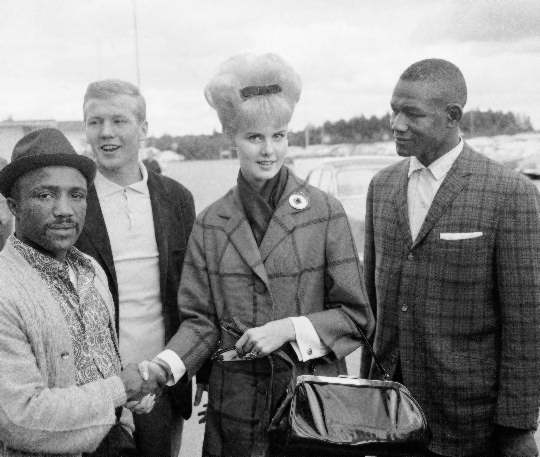
Boxers Davey Moore, Pertti Purhonen and Eddie Cotton with Miss Finland Kaarina Leskinen in 1962.

Eddie Cotton Jr. (June 15, 1926 — June 24, 1990) was an American professional boxer. He was a resident of Seattle, Washington, until his death on following a second liver transplant.

== Career ==
Born in Muskogee, Oklahoma, Cotton was a light heavyweight contender from the late 1950s until his retirement in the late 1960s. He was known as a good defensive fighter, although not very exciting. He was also prone to getting cut in fights. His style was undoubtedly influenced by his original trainer who had boxed in an almost identical manner.

He won the vacant Michigan version of the world light heavyweight championship in 1963, outpointing Henry Hank over 15 rounds, and twice unsuccessfully challenged for the world title, losing to Harold Johnson for the National Boxing Association title in 1961, and in 1966 losing what many felt was a controversial decision to José Torres for the world title. Ring Magazine named the Torres bout the "Fight of the Year". After the controversial Torres fight, Cotton was billed as the "Uncrowned Light Heavyweight Champion of the World."

Cotton fought 81 times in his career, winning 56, losing 23 and drawing 2 fights. He retired from boxing in 1967. After his boxing career ended, Cotton worked for the Boeing Aircraft Company as a tool and die maker. He was also a member of the Washington State Boxing Commission. Cotton also owned a restaurant in Seattle which bore his name.
