= Clarence Henry (boxer) =

American boxer

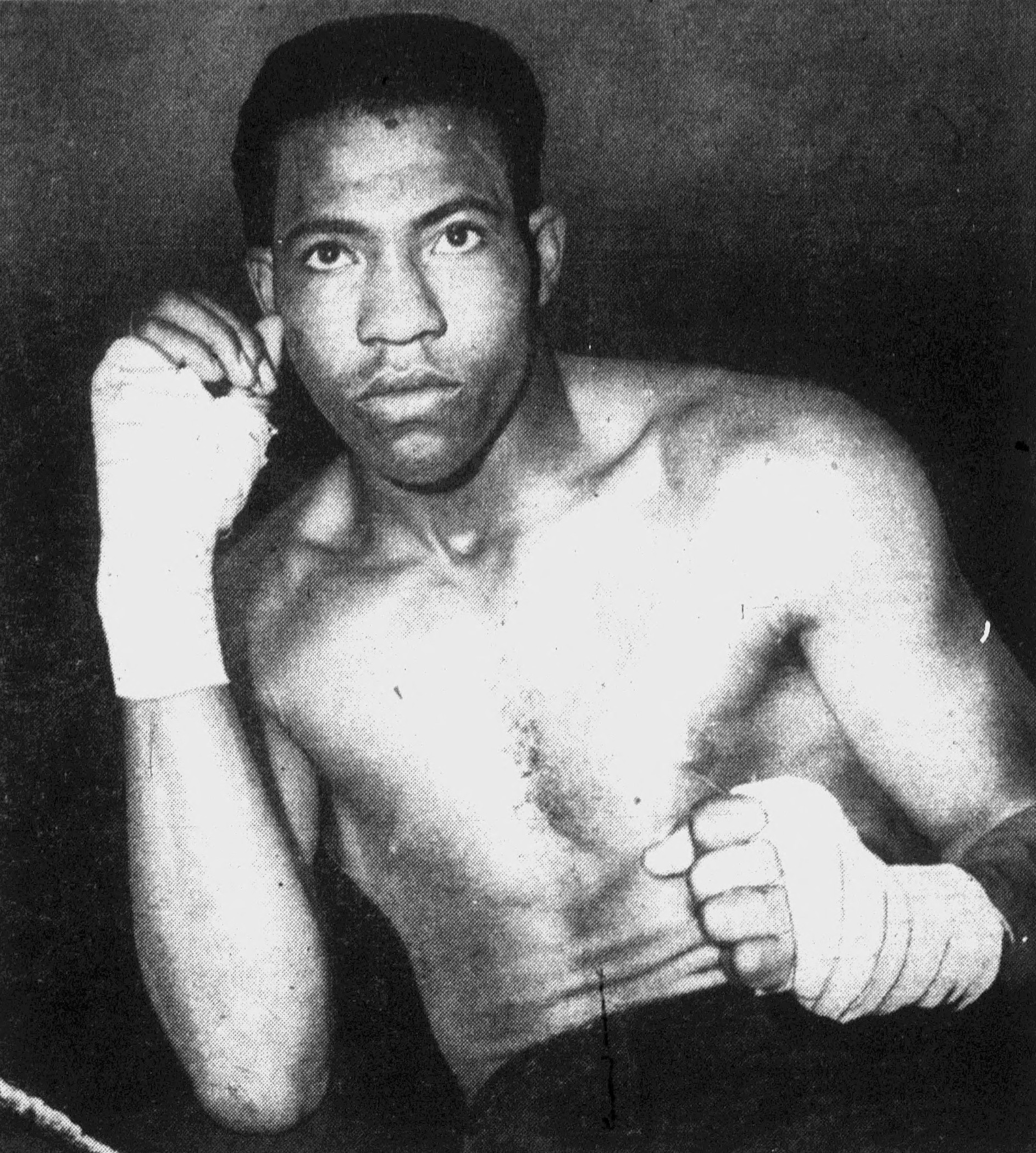
- Henry, circa 1951

Personal information
- Nationality: American
- Born: March 27, 1926 San Antonio, Texas, U.S.
- Died: February 28, 1999 (aged 72) Los Angeles, California, U.S.
- Height: 6 ft 1 in (1.85 m)

Boxing career
- Stance: Orthodox

Boxing record
- Total fights: 41
- Wins: 34
- Win by KO: 19
- Losses: 6
- Draws: 1

Clarence Henry (27 March 1926 – 28 February 1999) was an American boxer who won the 1948 Golden Gloves Tournament of Champions and was a highly ranked heavyweight contender during early 1950s.

== Career ==
Born in San Antonio, Texas and raised in Los Angeles, Henry won the 1948 Los Angeles Times Golden Gloves heavyweight championship, going on to win the national Golden Gloves championship in Chicago that year. In April 1948, he defeated Belgian Fernand Bothy as part the Chicago Golden Gloves Team representing the United States.

Henry was small for a heavyweight but had an explosive punch. Fighting out of Los Angeles, he won the Heavyweight Championship of California and the Heavyweight Championship of the Pacific Coast. On June 26, 1952, Henry fought Archie Moore six months before Moore won the light-heavyweight title from Joey Maxim. Weighing 184¾ lbs. to Moore's 176 lbs., he lost a unanimous decision in 10 rounds at Baltimore's Memorial Stadium. At his peak, he was the third-ranked heavyweight contender.

=== Arrest and retirement ===
In 1949, former heavyweight champ Jack Dempsey became his manager, though gangster Frank "Blinky" Palermo eventually owned his contract. On June 4, 1954, Henry was arrested in New York City for attempting to bribe Oakland, California middleweight Bobby Jones to throw his June 11 match in Madison Square Garden with Joey Giardello of Philadelphia, a future world's middleweight champion. Henry allegedly offered $15,000 (equivalent to approximately $179,833 in today's funds) to Jones to throw the fight, which Giardello subsequently won in a close decision. He retired from the ring that year.

== Legacy ==
Clarence Henry was elected to the World Boxing Hall of Fame in 1998, the year before his death.

== Championships and accomplishments ==
- Cauliflower Alley Club
  - Boxing Honoree (1992)
