= Howard King (boxer) =

American boxer

Howard King (born in Texas, United States) was an American heavyweight boxer and noted heavyweight contender during the 1950s and 60s. Best known as Howard "Honeyboy" King, he held a notable victory over George Chuvalo (which Chuvalo later avenged), and a draw against Archie Moore, regarded as the #1 Pound-for-Pound boxer of all time by Boxrec.

Though he never fought for a title, the 6'2" Honeyboy was a notable opponent for many of the top heavyweights of his era, including three fights against Zora Folley (0-3), six bouts against Archie Moore (0-5-1), two-fight series with George Chuvalo (1-1) and Sonny Liston (0-2), and a loss against Bob Satterfield.

He began his career fighting primarily in Nevada and California, but in his later years, fought around the world, including bouts in Mexico, England, Italy and Germany. He retired in 1964, with a record of 39 wins (14 KO), 29 losses (14 by KO), and 8 draws.

On 14 Aug 1962, outdoor at The Royal Showgrounds, Blackpool, Lancashire, Howard fought Brian London and was KO'd in the sixth round. This fight was notable as after a rain-shower the ring was so wet and slippery they agreed to fight in bare feet, after a tough 5 rounds Brian London knocked out Howard in the sixth.
