= Bob Satterfield =

American boxer (1923–1977)

Personal information
- Nickname: Bombardier
- Nationality: American
- Born: November 9, 1923 St. Louis, Missouri
- Died: June 1, 1977 (aged 53)
- Height: 5 ft 10 in (178 cm)
- Weight: Heavyweight

Boxing career
- Stance: Orthodox

Boxing record
- Total fights: 79
- Wins: 50
- Win by KO: 35
- Losses: 25
- Draws: 4

Bob "Bombardier" Satterfield (November 9, 1923 in St. Louis, Missouri – June 1, 1977) was a heavyweight boxer who fought from 1945 to 1957. Satterfield, a top-rated contender who never fought for the title, retired with a record of 50 wins (35 KOs), 25 losses and 4 draws. Known for his punching power, he is listed in Ring magazine's list of 100 greatest punchers of all time at number 58. Satterfield later died from cancer at the age of 53.

== Amateur career ==
Satterfield was the Chicago City Golden Gloves 147-pound champion in 1941. He lost to Al Tribuani on a first-round knockout in the inter-city championship between Chicago and New York boxers.

== Professional career ==
Satterfield, known for his punching power and aggressive style, was a fan favorite. His poor stamina and weak chin often cost him fights, however. In his bout against heavyweight contender Rex Layne on March 9, 1951, Satterfield hurt Layne, and knocked him down for an eight count in the first round. Layne slowly retook control of the fight, and ultimately knocked out Satterfield in the eighth round.

Satterfield was knocked out in 7 rounds by future middleweight champion Jake LaMotta on September 12, 1946. He was also knocked out in 2 rounds by former heavyweight champion Ezzard Charles on January 13, 1954. Satterfield did score a knockout over future heavyweight contender Cleveland Williams and also beat the dangerous giant Cuban Niño Valdés, but lost by KO to light heavyweight champion Archie Moore, and dropped 2 out of 3 to future light heavyweight champion Harold Johnson.

He retired from boxing on January 15, 1958, due to a detached retina in his left eye.

== In the media ==
In the 2007 motion picture Resurrecting the Champ (based on an L.A. Times Magazine article) a reporter named Erik Kernan Jr. finds a homeless man claiming to be Bob Satterfield and writes an article about him in the Denver Times Magazine. The film stars Samuel L. Jackson, Josh Hartnett and Alan Alda and was directed by Rod Lurie.

== Trivia ==
- Satterfield served in the United States Army from 1942 to 1945.
- The 1997 story "Resurrecting the Champ" by J.R. Moehringer in the Los Angeles Times said that he was friends with musician Miles Davis and introduced Muhammad Ali to his first wife. This was based on an interview in the Chicago home of his son, Robert Satterfield Jr.

== Professional boxing record ==
79 fights	50 wins	25 losses
By knockout	35	13
By decision	15	12
Draws	4	

No.	Result	Record	Opponent	Type	Round	Date	Age	Location
79	Win	50–25–4	Howard King	SD	10	Nov 21, 1957	34 years, 12 days	Auditorium, Oakland, California, U.S.
78	Win	49–25–4	Garvin Sawyer	SD	10	Oct 21, 1957	33 years, 346 days	Enright Theatre, Pittsburgh, Pennsylvania, U.S.
77	Loss	48–25–4	Bert Whitehurst	UD	10	Oct 1, 1957	33 years, 326 days	Sports Arena, Toledo, Ohio, U.S.
76	Loss	48–24–4	Julio Mederos	PTS	10	Jun 3, 1957	33 years, 206 days	Last Frontier Sportsdrome, Las Vegas, Nevada, U.S.
75	Win	48–23–4	Frankie Daniels	MD	10	May 16, 1957	33 years, 188 days	Memorial Auditorium, Sacramento, California, U.S.
74	Win	47–23–4	Ben Wise	KO	1 (10)	Apr 15, 1957	33 years, 157 days	Auditorium, Oakland, California, U.S.
73	Loss	46–23–4	Harold Johnson	UD	10	Mar 12, 1957	33 years, 123 days	Auditorium, Miami Beach, Florida, U.S.
72	Win	46–22–4	Julio Mederos	UD	10	Feb 4, 1957	33 years, 87 days	Arena, Milwaukee, Wisconsin, U.S.
71	Win	45–22–4	Dale Hall	KO	5 (10)	Jan 8, 1957	33 years, 60 days	Auditorium, Portland, Oregon, U.S.
70	Win	44–22–4	Warnell Lester	KO	10 (10)	Nov 27, 1956	33 years, 18 days	Auditorium, Miami Beach, Florida, U.S.
69	Win	43–22–4	Claude Chapman	KO	7 (10)	Nov 12, 1956	33 years, 3 days	Rhode Island Auditorium, Providence, Rhode Island, U.S.
68	Loss	42–22–4	Harold Carter	TKO	5 (10)	Aug 1, 1956	32 years, 266 days	War Memorial Auditorium, Syracuse, New York, U.S.
67	Win	42–21–4	Johnny Summerlin	UD	10	Jun 20, 1956	32 years, 224 days	Chicago Stadium, Chicago, Illinois, U.S.
66	Win	41–21–4	Jim Persey	UD	10	Apr 10, 1956	32 years, 153 days	Auditorium, Miami Beach, Florida, U.S.
65	Loss	40–21–4	Harold Carter	UD	10	Mar 20, 1956	32 years, 132 days	Auditorium, Miami Beach, Florida, U.S.
64	Draw	40–20–4	Harold Carter	PTS	10	Feb 28, 1956	32 years, 111 days	Auditorium, Miami Beach, Florida, U.S.
63	Loss	40–20–3	John Holman	TKO	8 (10)	Jan 11, 1956	32 years, 63 days	Chicago Stadium, Chicago, Illinois, U.S.
62	Win	40–19–3	Paul Andrews	KO	9 (10)	Dec 6, 1955	32 years, 27 days	Memorial Auditorium, Buffalo, New York, U.S.
61	Win	39–19–3	Niño Valdés	UD	10	Aug 17, 1955	31 years, 281 days	Chicago Stadium, Chicago, Illinois, U.S.
60	Draw	38–19–3	Joe Rowan	PTS	10	Jul 19, 1955	31 years, 252 days	Auditorium, Miami Beach, Florida, U.S.
59	Loss	38–19–2	Archie McBride	SD	10	May 11, 1955	31 years, 183 days	Chicago Stadium, Chicago, Illinois, U.S.
58	Loss	38–18–2	Joe Lindsay	UD	10	Apr 19, 1955	31 years, 161 days	Auditorium, Miami Beach, Florida, U.S.
57	Win	38–17–2	Marty Marshall	SD	10	Mar 22, 1955	31 years, 133 days	Auditorium, Miami Beach, Florida, U.S.
56	Loss	37–17–2	Marty Marshall	KO	2 (10)	Nov 30, 1954	31 years, 21 days	Marigold Gardens, Chicago, Illinois, U.S.
55	Win	37–16–2	John Holman	KO	1 (10)	Nov 10, 1954	31 years, 1 day	Chicago Stadium, Chicago, Illinois, U.S.
54	Win	36–16–2	Frankie Daniels	TKO	7 (10)	Aug 30, 1954	30 years, 294 days	St. Nicholas Arena, New York City, New York, U.S.
53	Win	35–16–2	John Holman	KO	10 (10)	Jul 20, 1954	30 years, 253 days	Auditorium, Miami Beach, Florida, U.S.
52	Win	34–16–2	Cleveland Williams	KO	3 (10)	Jun 22, 1954	30 years, 225 days	Auditorium, Miami Beach, Florida, U.S.
51	Loss	33–16–2	Charley Williams	SD	10	Jun 1, 1954	30 years, 204 days	Auditorium, Miami Beach, Florida, U.S.
50	Win	33–15–2	Julio Mederos	KO	2 (10)	May 11, 1954	30 years, 183 days	Auditorium, Miami Beach, Florida, U.S.
49	Loss	32–15–2	Ezzard Charles	KO	2 (10)	Jan 13, 1954	30 years, 65 days	Rainbo Arena, Chicago, Illinois, U.S.
48	Win	32–14–2	Ray Augustus	KO	8 (8)	Dec 15, 1953	30 years, 36 days	Rainbo Arena, Chicago, Illinois, U.S.
47	Win	31–14–2	Bob Baker	KO	1 (10)	Jul 1, 1953	29 years, 234 days	Chicago Stadium, Chicago, Illinois, U.S.
46	Win	30–14–2	Gene Brown	KO	2 (10)	Jun 3, 1953	29 years, 206 days	Arena, Saint Louis, Missouri, U.S.
45	Win	29–14–2	Murray Burnett	KO	3 (6)	May 15, 1953	29 years, 187 days	Chicago Stadium, Chicago, Illinois, U.S.
44	Loss	28–14–2	Harold Johnson	KO	2 (10)	Oct 6, 1952	28 years, 332 days	Arena, Philadelphia, Pennsylvania, U.S.
43	Win	28–13–2	Harold Johnson	SD	10	Aug 6, 1952	28 years, 271 days	Chicago Stadium, Chicago, Illinois, U.S.
42	Loss	27–13–2	Clarence Henry	TKO	1 (10)	Jan 30, 1952	28 years, 82 days	Chicago Stadium, Chicago, Illinois, U.S.
41	Loss	27–12–2	Wes Bascom	MD	10	Nov 15, 1951	28 years, 6 days	Arena, Saint Louis, Missouri, U.S.
40	Loss	27–11–2	Rex Layne	TKO	8 (10)	Mar 9, 1951	27 years, 120 days	Madison Square Garden, New York City, New York, U.S.
39	Win	27–10–2	Elkins Brothers	TKO	2 (10)	Jan 19, 1951	27 years, 71 days	St. Nicholas Arena, New York City, New York, U.S.
38	Win	26–10–2	Vern Mitchell	UD	10	Dec 13, 1950	27 years, 34 days	Chicago Stadium, Chicago, Illinois, U.S.
37	Loss	25–10–2	Lee Oma	UD	10	Sep 25, 1950	26 years, 320 days	Memorial Auditorium, Buffalo, New York, U.S.
36	Win	25–9–2	Lee Oma	KO	6 (10)	May 17, 1950	26 years, 189 days	Chicago Stadium, Chicago, Illinois, U.S.
35	Win	24–9–2	Tommy Gómez	UD	10	Mar 22, 1950	26 years, 133 days	Chicago Stadium, Chicago, Illinois, U.S.
34	Win	23–9–2	Nick Barone	UD	10	Feb 22, 1950	26 years, 105 days	Chicago Stadium, Chicago, Illinois, U.S.
33	Win	22–9–2	Sylvester Perkins	TKO	2 (10)	Nov 18, 1949	25 years, 282 days	Chicago Stadium, Chicago, Illinois, U.S.
32	Loss	21–9–2	Henry Hall	KO	4 (10)	Apr 25, 1949	25 years, 167 days	Auditorium, Milwaukee, Wisconsin, U.S.
31	Loss	21–8–2	Archie Moore	KO	3 (10)	Jan 31, 1949	25 years, 83 days	Sports Arena, Toledo, Ohio, U.S.
30	Win	21–7–2	Bob Amos	PTS	10	Dec 10, 1948	25 years, 31 days	International Amphitheatre, Chicago, Illinois, U.S.
29	Loss	20–7–2	Joey Maxim	UD	10	Nov 12, 1948	25 years, 3 days	Chicago Stadium, Chicago, Illinois, U.S.
28	Draw	20–6–2	Bob Amos	PTS	10	Sep 15, 1948	24 years, 311 days	Chicago Stadium, Chicago, Illinois, U.S.
27	Win	20–6–1	Richard Hagan	TKO	9 (10)	Sep 7, 1948	24 years, 303 days	Marigold Gardens, Chicago, Illinois, U.S.
26	Win	19–6–1	Oakland Billy Smith	KO	1 (10)	Jun 29, 1948	24 years, 233 days	Marigold Gardens, Chicago, Illinois, U.S.
25	Win	18–6–1	Art Swiden	KO	1 (10)	May 7, 1948	24 years, 180 days	Chicago Stadium, Chicago, Illinois, U.S.
24	Loss	17–6–1	Sam Baroudi	TKO	2 (10)	Jan 23, 1948	24 years, 75 days	Chicago Stadium, Chicago, Illinois, U.S.
23	Win	17–5–1	Al Johnson	PTS	10	Nov 12, 1947	24 years, 3 days	Chicago Stadium, Chicago, Illinois, U.S.
22	Win	16–5–1	Chuck Hunter	KO	10 (10)	Oct 6, 1947	23 years, 331 days	Chicago Stadium, Chicago, Illinois, U.S.
21	Loss	15–5–1	Al Johnson	UD	8	Aug 18, 1947	23 years, 282 days	Marigold Gardens Outdoor Arena, Chicago, Illinois, U.S.
20	Win	15–4–1	Willie Moore	KO	2 (8)	Jun 30, 1947	23 years, 233 days	Marigold Gardens, Chicago, Illinois, U.S.
19	Loss	14–4–1	Bob Foxworth	KO	1 (10)	Mar 14, 1947	23 years, 125 days	Chicago Stadium, Chicago, Illinois, U.S.
18	Win	14–3–1	Willie Moore	UD	8	Feb 10, 1947	23 years, 93 days	Marigold Gardens, Chicago, Illinois, U.S.
17	Loss	13–3–1	Jake LaMotta	KO	7 (10)	Sep 12, 1946	22 years, 276 days	Wrigley Field, Chicago, Illinois, U.S.
16	Win	13–2–1	Vince Pimpinella	KO	2 (10)	Aug 14, 1946	22 years, 278 days	Comiskey Park, Chicago, Illinois, U.S.
15	Loss	12–2–1	Holman Williams	SD	10	Apr 25, 1946	22 years, 167 days	Coliseum, Chicago, Illinois, U.S.
14	Win	12–1–1	Johnny Clark	TKO	5 (10)	Mar 28, 1946	22 years, 139 days	Coliseum North Hall, Chicago, Illinois, U.S.
13	Win	11–1–1	Benny McCombs	KO	2 (8)	Dec 26, 1945	22 years, 47 days	Ashland Blvd. Auditorium, Chicago, Illinois, U.S.
12	Win	10–1–1	Collins Brown	KO	1 (10)	Dec 7, 1945	22 years, 28 days	Chicago Stadium, Chicago, Illinois, U.S.
11	Win	9–1–1	Bob Garner	KO	2 (8)	Nov 14, 1945	22 years, 5 days	Ashland Blvd. Auditorium, Chicago, Illinois, U.S.
10	Win	8–1–1	Charley Polk	KO	2 (8)	Oct 24, 1945	21 years, 349 days	Ashland Blvd. Auditorium, Chicago, Illinois, U.S.
9	Win	7–1–1	Oscar Boyd	KO	4 (6)	Sep 27, 1945	21 years, 322 days	Auditorium, Milwaukee, Wisconsin, U.S.
8	Win	6–1–1	Curley Denton	KO	1 (6)	Sep 6, 1945	21 years, 301 days	Auditorium, Milwaukee, Wisconsin, U.S.
7	Win	5–1–1	Vecie Van	KO	1 (6)	Aug 10, 1945	21 years, 274 days	Auditorium, Milwaukee, Wisconsin, U.S.
6	Win	4–1–1	Herman Hayes	KO	1 (6)	Jul 23, 1945	21 years, 256 days	Marigold Gardens Outdoor Arena, Chicago, Illinois, U.S.
5	Draw	3–1–1	Johnny Vorce	PTS	8	May 28, 1945	21 years, 200 days	Marigold Gardens Outdoor Arena, Chicago, Illinois, U.S.
4	Win	3–1	Charley Roth	KO	1 (4)	May 7, 1945	21 years, 179 days	Marigold Gardens, Chicago, Illinois, U.S.
3	Loss	2–1	Mack Parshay	KO	1 (4)	May 2, 1945	21 years, 174 days	Coliseum, Chicago, Illinois, U.S.
2	Win	2–0	Arthur McWhorter	KO	1 (4)	Apr 23, 1945	21 years, 165 days	Marigold Gardens, Chicago, Illinois, U.S.
1	Win	1–0	Tom Mitchell	KO	1 (4)	Mar 19, 1945	21 years, 130 days	Marigold Gardens, Chicago, Illinois, U.S.
