= Charley Williams =

American boxer (1928–2009)

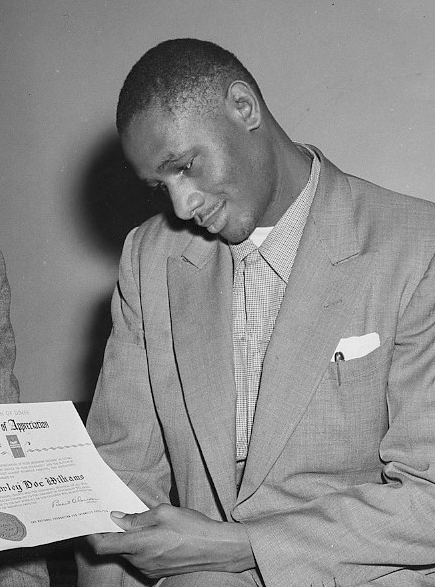
- Williams in 1951

Personal information
- Born: February 4, 1928 Kansas City, Missouri, U.S.
- Died: October 30, 2009 (aged 81) Jacksonville, Florida, U.S.
- Weight: Light heavyweight

Boxing career

Boxing record
- Total fights: 71
- Wins: 51
- Win by KO: 22
- Losses: 18
- Draws: 2

Charles Edward "Doc" Williams (February 4, 1928 – October 30, 2009) was an American professional boxer who was active during the 1940s and 1950s.

== Life and career ==
Charles Edward Williams was born in Kansas City, Missouri on February 4, 1928. He fought many of the top fighters of his era, and held wins over several members of the famed Murderers' Row (boxing), including a win over Charley Burley and multiple wins over Bert Lytell. Williams also had a win over Bob Satterfield and notable bouts against all-time greats Archie Moore, Kid Gavilan and Jimmy Bivins. Like many African American boxers of his era, including Burley and Lytell, he never received a title shot despite being ranked as a top ten light heavyweight for many years. He retired in 1954 after a streak of three straight wins, with a record of 51 wins, 18 losses, and 2 draws. Williams lived in Jacksonville, Florida. He died there on October 30, 2009, at the age of 81.
