= Sam Baroudi =

American boxer (1926–1948)

Personal information
- Nationality: American
- Born: Sammy Crandall; August 29, 1926 Akron, Ohio
- Died: February 21, 1948 (aged 21) Chicago, Illinois
- Height: 6 ft 0 in (183 cm)
- Weight: Middleweight

Boxing career
- Stance: Orthodox

Boxing record
- Total fights: 56
- Wins: 41
- Win by KO: 21
- Losses: 11
- Draws: 2
- No contests: 2

Sam Baroudi (born Sammy Crandall, August 29, 1926 – February 21, 1948) was a professional American boxer in the middleweight division.

== Boxing career ==
Baroudi fought his first professional fight on May 15, 1945 in the Meadowbrook Bowl in Newark, New Jersey, winning against Jimmy Picollo by knockout in the first round. Over the next two years his record was 35 wins, 7 losses, and two draws. On August 15, 1947, in his 44th fight, Baroudi fought Newton Smith, knocking Smith out in the ninth round. Smith never regained consciousness and later died in the hospital. Baroudi lost his next fight on points, but started another winning streak. Until his last fight, Baroudi never went down in 52 fights.

== Death ==
On February 20, 1948, Baroudi fought in Chicago against future world heavyweight champion Ezzard Charles. In the tenth round, Charles knocked out Baroudi, and like his fight with Newton Smith six months earlier, Baroudi never regained consciousness, succumbing to a brain hemorrhage at the hospital a few hours later. Charles was so shaken by the young fighter’s death that he considered ending his boxing career, but Baroudi's family convinced Charles to continue fighting.

== Professional boxing record ==
56 fights	41 wins	11 losses
By knockout	21	1
By decision	20	10
Draws	2	
No contests	2	

No.	Result	Record	Opponent	Type	Round, time	Date	Location	Notes
56	Loss	41–11–2 (2)	Ezzard Charles	KO	10 (10)	Feb 20, 1948	Chicago Stadium, Chicago, Illinois, US	Baroudi died of injuries sustained from the fight.
55	Win	41–10–2 (2)	Bob Satterfield	TKO	2 (10)	Jan 23, 1948	Chicago Stadium, Chicago, Illinois, US	
54	Win	40–10–2 (2)	Frankie Best	PTS	10	Jan 5, 1948	Sports Arena, Rochester, New York, US	
53	Win	39–10–2 (2)	Al Johnson	PTS	10	Dec 4, 1947	Chicago Stadium, Chicago, Illinois, US	
52	Win	38–10–2 (2)	Prentiss Hall	KO	6 (10)	Nov 12, 1947	Kalurah Temple, Binghamton, New York, US	
51	Win	37–10–2 (2)	Bobby Dare	KO	6 (10)	Oct 29, 1947	Armory, Akron, Ohio, US	
50	Loss	36–10–2 (2)	Aaron Wade	SD	10	Oct 13, 1947	Valley Arena, Holyoke, Massachusetts, US	
49	Loss	36–9–2 (2)	Henry Hall	UD	10	Sep 8, 1947	Century Stadium, West Springfield, Massachusetts, US	
48	Loss	36–8–2 (2)	Roy Miller	SD	10	Sep 5, 1947	Meadowbrook Arena, North Adams, Massachusetts, US	
47	Win	36–7–2 (2)	Newton Smith	KO	9 (10)	Aug 15, 1947	Meadowbrook Arena, North Adams, Massachusetts, US	Smith died of injuries sustained from the fight.
46	Win	35–7–2 (2)	Randy Brown	TKO	5 (10), 1:44	Jul 25, 1947	Meadowbrook Arena, North Adams, Massachusetts, US	
45	Loss	34–7–2 (2)	Tommy Hubert	PTS	10	Jun 27, 1947	Wahconah Park, Pittsfield, Massachusetts, US	
44	Loss	34–6–2 (2)	Major Jones	PTS	10	May 21, 1947	Municipal Auditorium, Kansas City, Missouri, US	
43	Win	34–5–2 (2)	Freddie Wilson	KO	2 (8)	May 7, 1947	Kalurah Temple, Binghamton, New York, US	
42	Win	33–5–2 (2)	Jess Moraney	TKO	7 (8)	Apr 30, 1947	Kingston Armory, Kingston, Pennsylvania, US	
41	Loss	32–5–2 (2)	Bert Lytell	UD	10	Apr 7, 1947	St. Nicholas Arena, New York City, New York, US	
40	Win	32–4–2 (2)	Buddy Rose	TKO	6 (10)	Mar 7, 1947	Fayette Street Garden, Baltimore, Maryland, US	
39	Win	31–4–2 (2)	Deacon Johnny Brown	UD	10	Feb 24, 1947	Valley Arena, Holyoke, Massachusetts, US	
38	Win	30–4–2 (2)	Buddy Farrell	KO	10 (10)	Jan 8, 1947	Armory, Akron, Ohio, US	
37	Win	29–4–2 (2)	Coolidge Miller	KO	4 (10)	Dec 10, 1946	Sixto Escobar Stadium, San Juan, Puerto Rico	
36	Win	28–4–2 (2)	Willie Scott	KO	6 (10)	Nov 14, 1946	Crystal Palace Rink, Pittsfield, Massachusetts, US	
35	Win	27–4–2 (2)	Holman Williams	SD	10	Oct 14, 1946	St. Nicholas Arena, New York City, New York, US	
34	Draw	26–4–2 (2)	Chuck Hunter	SD	10	Sep 12, 1946	Armory, Akron, Ohio, US	
33	Win	26–4–1 (2)	Johnny Eagles	UD	10	Aug 29, 1946	Noel Field, North Adams, Massachusetts, US	
32	Win	25–4–1 (2)	Ernie Griffin	KO	4 (10), 2:20	Aug 20, 1946	Wahconah Park, Pittsfield, Massachusetts, US	
31	Win	24–4–1 (2)	Buddy Farrell	KO	6 (10)	Aug 8, 1946	Noel Field, North Adams, Massachusetts, US	
30	Win	23–4–1 (2)	Ellis Stewart	MD	10	Jul 26, 1946	Wahconah Park, Pittsfield, Massachusetts, US	
29	Win	22–4–1 (2)	Saint Paul	UD	10	Jun 25, 1946	Wahconah Park, Pittsfield, Massachusetts, US	
28	Win	21–4–1 (2)	Vinnie Vines	KO	2 (8), 1:25	Jun 12, 1946	Kalurah Temple, Binghamton, New York, US	
27	Win	20–4–1 (2)	Marcus Lockman	KO	6 (10), 2:10	Jun 5, 1946	Wahconah Park, Pittsfield, Massachusetts, US	
26	Win	19–4–1 (2)	Billy Carrigan	TKO	6 (8)	May 22, 1946	Kalurah Temple, Binghamton, New York, US	
25	Loss	18–4–1 (2)	Vinnie Vines	PTS	8	Apr 24, 1946	Kalurah Temple, Binghamton, New York, US	
24	Win	18–3–1 (2)	Artie Towne	PTS	6	Apr 12, 1946	St. Nicholas Arena, New York City, New York, US	
23	Win	17–3–1 (2)	George Riley	UD	8	Apr 2, 1946	Memorial Auditorium, Buffalo, New York, US	
22	Win	16–3–1 (2)	Henry Brimm	UD	6	Mar 18, 1946	Memorial Auditorium, Buffalo, New York, US	
21	Win	15–3–1 (2)	Len Wadsworth	PTS	8	Mar 13, 1946	Kalurah Temple, Binghamton, New York, US	
20	Win	14–3–1 (2)	Willie Davis	UD	8	Feb 27, 1946	Kalurah Temple, Binghamton, New York, US	
19	Win	13–3–1 (2)	Allen Faulkner	KO	1 (6), 3:00	Feb 19, 1946	Memorial Auditorium, Buffalo, New York, US	
18	Win	12–3–1 (2)	Jackie Gaines	KO	4 (6), 0:35	Feb 13, 1946	Kalurah Temple, Binghamton, New York, US	
17	Win	11–3–1 (2)	Joe Evans	KO	3 (4)	Jan 4, 1946	Madison Square Garden, New York City, New York, US	
16	Win	10–3–1 (2)	Clarence Wilkinson	PTS	4	Dec 7, 1945	Madison Square Garden, New York City, New York, US	
15	NC	9–3–1 (2)	Lee Black	NC	3 (6), 2:45	Nov 26, 1945	LaSalle Gym, Troy, New York, US	Fight stopped due to a "lack of action"
14	Win	9–3–1 (1)	Benny Davis	PTS	6	Oct 30, 1945	Park Arena, New York City, New York, US	
13	Win	8–3–1 (1)	Billy Johnson	PTS	6	Oct 5, 1945	St. Nicholas Arena, New York City, New York, US	
12	Win	7–3–1 (1)	Freddie Patterson	PTS	6	Sep 28, 1945	Fort Hamilton Arena, New York City, New York, US	
11	Win	6–3–1 (1)	Billy Johnson	PTS	6	Sep 20, 1945	Fort Hamilton Arena, New York City, New York, US	
10	Win	5–3–1 (1)	Hugh Murphy	TKO	5 (6)	Sep 11, 1945	Broadway Arena, New York City, New York, US	Murphy did not come out for the 6th round
9	Win	4–3–1 (1)	Joe Torrens	PTS	4	Sep 7, 1945	Madison Square Garden, New York City, New York, US	
8	Win	3–3–1 (1)	Hugh Murphy	PTS	6	Sep 4, 1945	Sterling Oval, New York City, New York, US	
7	Win	2–3–1 (1)	Andy Faison	PTS	6	Aug 31, 1945	Long Beach Stadium, Long Beach, New York, US	
6	Loss	1–3–1 (1)	Tony Del Gatto	PTS	6	Aug 13, 1945	Queensboro Arena, New York City, New York, US	
5	Draw	1–2–1 (1)	Wendy Wilson	PTS	6	Aug 7, 1945	Auditorium Outdoor Arena, Hartford, Connecticut, US	
4	Loss	1–2 (1)	Clarence Wilkinson	PTS	4	Aug 2, 1945	Fort Hamilton Arena, New York City, New York, US	
3	NC	1–1 (1)	Artie Towne	NC	4 (6)	Jul 23, 1945	Meadowbrook Bowl, Newark, New Jersey, US	Referee stopped the fight for a "lack of action"
2	Loss	1–1	Charley Early	PTS	6	May 29, 1945	Meadowbrook Bowl, Newark, New Jersey, US	
1	Win	1–0	Jimmy Picollo	KO	1 (4)	May 14, 1945	Meadowbrook Bowl, Newark, New Jersey, US	
