= Bert Lytell (boxer) =

American boxer (1924–1990)

Calvin Coolidge Lytle (January 24, 1924 – January 26, 1990), better known by his professional names Bert Lytell and Chocolate Kid, was an American boxer and middleweight contender in the 1940s and early 1950s. Recognized as a member of the famous Murderers' Row, the 5'8" Lytell fought (and often won) against other top black middleweights of his time, including Charley Burley, Herbert "Cocoa Kid" Lewis Hardwick, Holman Williams, and Charley Doc Williams, as well as other notable fighters including Archie Moore and Sam Baroudi.

Like many of his contemporaries, Bert Lytell was denied a chance to fight for a world title largely due to his race.

Lytell was born in Victoria, Texas. He enlisted in the Naval reserves in 1942 in San Antonio, Texas, and was discharged in 1944. He resided in New York City for most of his career, later moving to Oakland, California to be closer to his family, including brother Loyal Lytle. During his career, he was known as The Beast of Stillman's Gym. He was one of the members of the famous Black Murderers' Row, a group of world-class African American welterweights and middleweights who were avoided by most top white fighters of their era and never got the chance to fight for a world title, despite being well-regarded by the boxing community.

The "Chocolate Kid" died on January 26, 1990, 2 days after his 66th birthday.

== Professional boxing record ==
102 fights	71 wins	23 losses
By knockout	24	1
By decision	46	22
By disqualification	1	0
Draws	7	
No contests	1	

No.	Result	Record	Opponent	Type	Round	Date	Location	Notes
102	Loss	71–23–7 (1)	Clinton Bacon	PTS	10	Apr 16, 1951	Turner's Arena, Washington, D.C., U.S.	
101	Win	71–22–7 (1)	Lajuin Burks	KO	2 (?)	Apr 6, 1951	Roswell, New Mexico, U.S.	
100	Win	70–22–7 (1)	Clinton Bacon	UD	10	Feb 19, 1951	Carlsbad, New Mexico, U.S.	
99	ND	69–22–7 (1)	Oakland Billy Smith	NC	10 (10)	Nov 15, 1950	County Coliseum, El Paso, Texas, U.S.	
98	Loss	69–22–7	Artie Towne	SD	10	Aug 15, 1950	Sports Arena, Toledo, Ohio, U.S.	
97	Loss	69–21–7	Jimmy Slade	SD	10	Jul 31, 1950	Gannon College Auditorium, Erie, Pennsylvania, U.S.	
96	Win	69–20–7	Bob Amos	UD	10	May 26, 1950	Outdoor Sports Arena, Indianapolis, Indiana, U.S.	
95	Loss	68–20–7	Archie Moore	UD	10	Jan 31, 1950	Sports Arena, Toledo, Ohio, U.S.	
94	Win	68–19–7	Billy Davis	PTS	10	Jan 11, 1950	Topeka, Kansas, U.S.	
93	Win	67–19–7	Alvin Williams	PTS	10	Jan 4, 1950	Wichita, Kansas, U.S.	
92	Loss	66–19–7	Harold Johnson	MD	10	Dec 7, 1949	Memorial Hall, Dayton, Ohio, U.S.	
91	Win	66–18–7	Charley Williams	KO	8 (10)	Nov 14, 1949	Memorial Hall, Dayton, Ohio, U.S.	
90	Win	65–18–7	Jerome Frazier	UD	10	Oct 25, 1949	Auditorium, Milwaukee, Wisconsin, U.S.	
89	Win	64–18–7	Bob Amos	UD	10	Aug 18, 1949	Collins Sports Acre, Dayton, Ohio, U.S.	
88	Loss	63–18–7	Charley Williams	UD	10	Aug 1, 1949	Century Stadium, West Springfield, Massachusetts, U.S.	
87	Loss	63–17–7	Jimmy Hooper	UD	10	Jun 30, 1949	Meadowbrook Arena, North Adams, Massachusetts, U.S.	
86	Win	63–16–7	Chubby Wright	PTS	10	Jun 22, 1949	Scranton-Dunmore Stadium, Dunmore, Pennsylvania, U.S.	
85	Draw	62–16–7	Gentle Daniel	PTS	10	Apr 30, 1949	Mucurapo Stadium, Port-of-Spain, Trinidad and Tobago	
84	Win	62–16–6	Gentle Daniel	KO	1 (10)	Apr 1, 1949	Mucurapo Stadium, Port-of-Spain, Trinidad and Tobago	
83	Loss	61–16–6	Henry Hall	PTS	8	Mar 18, 1949	Madison Square Garden, New York City, New York, U.S.	
82	Loss	61–15–6	Henry Hall	UD	10	Mar 2, 1949	Auditorium, Milwaukee, Wisconsin, U.S.	
81	Win	61–14–6	Al Johnson	KO	7 (10)	Feb 16, 1949	Wichita, Kansas, U.S.	
80	Draw	60–14–6	Henry Hall	PTS	10	Feb 7, 1949	Laurel Garden, Newark, New Jersey, U.S.	
79	Win	60–14–5	Jerome Frazier	KO	5 (10)	Jan 1, 1949	Auditorium, Milwaukee, Wisconsin, U.S.	
78	Win	59–14–5	Sylvester Perkins	UD	10	Dec 14, 1948	Kansas City, Missouri, U.S.	
77	Win	58–14–5	Gentle Daniel	PTS	10	Oct 30, 1948	Mucurapo Stadium, Port-of-Spain, Trinidad And Tobago	
76	Win	57–14–5	José Basora	UD	10	Oct 20, 1948	Sixto Escobar Stadium, San Juan, Puerto Rico	
75	Win	56–14–5	Cyril Francis	PTS	10	Oct 1, 1948	Mucurapo Stadium, Port-of-Spain, Trinidad And Tobago	
74	Loss	55–14–5	Charley Williams	UD	10	Sep 16, 1948	Meadowbrook Arena, North Adams, Massachusetts, U.S.	
73	Win	55–13–5	Roy Williams	UD	10	Aug 16, 1948	Queensboro Arena, New York City, New York, U.S.	
72	Win	54–13–5	Oakland Billy Smith	UD	10	Jul 14, 1948	Crosley Field, Cincinnati, Ohio, U.S.	
71	Win	53–13–5	Roy Miller	UD	10	Jun 22, 1948	Auditorium, Milwaukee, Wisconsin, U.S.	
70	Win	52–13–5	Jackie Darthard	RTD	6 (10)	Apr 21, 1948	Auditorium, Milwaukee, Wisconsin, U.S.	Darthard died of injuries sustained in the fight
69	Win	51–13–5	Major Jones	UD	10	Apr 5, 1948	Auditorium, Milwaukee, Wisconsin, U.S.	
68	Win	50–13–5	Watson Jones	TKO	5 (10)	Mar 24, 1948	Auditorium, Oakland, California, U.S.	
67	Draw	49–13–5	Jackie Darthard	PTS	10	Feb 16, 1948	Kansas City, Missouri, U.S.	
66	Loss	49–13–4	Leonard Morrow	SD	10	Feb 11, 1948	Auditorium, Oakland, California, U.S.	
65	Win	49–12–4	Oakland Billy Smith	PTS	10	Jan 21, 1948	Auditorium, Oakland, California, U.S.	
64	Win	48–12–4	Joe Blackwood	PTS	8	Jan 9, 1948	Madison Square Garden, New York City, New York, U.S.	
63	Win	47–12–4	Major Jones	SD	10	Nov 25, 1947	Municipal Auditorium, Kansas City, Missouri, U.S.	
62	Loss	46–12–4	Archie Moore	UD	10	Jul 14, 1947	Coliseum, Baltimore, Maryland, U.S.	
61	Win	46–11–4	Holman Williams	UD	12	Jul 4, 1947	Pelican Stadium, New Orleans, Louisiana, U.S.	
60	Win	45–11–4	Bobby Lakin	TKO	5 (10)	Jun 21, 1947	Wahconah Park, Pittsfield, Massachusetts, U.S.	
59	Win	44–11–4	Herbert Lewis Hardwick	RTD	6 (10)	May 18, 1947	Coliseum Arena, New Orleans, Louisiana, U.S.	
58	Win	43–11–4	Juan José Fernández	KO	6 (10)	Apr 21, 1947	Mechanics Building, Boston, Massachusetts, U.S.	
57	Win	42–11–4	Sam Baroudi	UD	10	Apr 7, 1947	St. Nicholas Arena, New York City, New York, U.S.	
56	Win	41–11–4	Eddie O'Neill	UD	10	Mar 18, 1947	Arena Gardens, Detroit, Michigan, U.S.	
55	Win	40–11–4	Anthony Jones	TKO	9 (10)	Mar 3, 1947	Mechanics Building, Boston, Massachusetts, U.S.	
54	Win	39–11–4	Charley Burley	UD	10	Feb 17, 1947	Coliseum, Baltimore, Maryland, U.S.	
53	Win	38–11–4	George Smith	TKO	3 (8)	Jan 21, 1947	Watres Armory, Scranton, Pennsylvania, U.S.	
52	Win	37–11–4	Henry Hall	PTS	10	Jan 13, 1947	Valley Arena, Holyoke, Massachusetts, U.S.	
51	Win	36–11–4	Deacon Johnny Brown	PTS	8	Nov 8, 1946	Fayette Street Garden, Baltimore, Maryland, U.S.	
50	Win	35–11–4	Johnny Taylor	KO	3 (10)	Oct 28, 1946	Valley Arena, Holyoke, Massachusetts, U.S.	
49	Win	34–11–4	Johnny Eagles	UD	10	Oct 17, 1946	Crystal Palace Rink, Pittsfield, Massachusetts, U.S.	
48	Loss	33–11–4	Deacon Johnny Brown	TKO	2 (10)	Sep 2, 1946	Coliseum, Baltimore, Maryland, U.S.	
47	Win	33–10–4	Saint Paul	UD	10	Aug 30, 1946	Wahconah Park, Pittsfield, Massachusetts, U.S.	
46	Loss	32–10–4	Charley Burley	UD	10	Aug 5, 1946	Zivic Arena, Millvale, Pennsylvania, U.S.	
45	Win	32–9–4	Herbert Lewis Hardwick	PTS	10	Jul 30, 1946	Sixto Escobar Stadium, San Juan, Puerto Rico	
44	Win	31–9–4	Roy Miller	PTS	10	Jun 28, 1946	Municipal Auditorium, Kansas City, Missouri, U.S.	
43	Win	30–9–4	Holman Williams	UD	10	Apr 15, 1946	Valley Arena, Holyoke, Massachusetts, U.S.	
42	Draw	29–9–4	Jackie Cooper	PTS	10	Apr 5, 1946	Coliseum Arena, New Orleans, Louisiana, U.S.	
41	Win	29–9–3	Johnny Lawer	PTS	10	Apr 2, 1946	Rayen-Wood Auditorium, Youngstown, Ohio, U.S.	
40	Win	28–9–3	Herbert Lewis Hardwick	PTS	10	Mar 25, 1946	Valley Arena, Holyoke, Massachusetts, U.S.	
39	Loss	27–9–3	Walter Woods	PTS	10	Feb 4, 1946	Rhode Island Auditorium, Providence, Rhode Island, U.S.	
38	Win	27–8–3	Cyril Gittens	KO	2 (10)	Jan 21, 1946	New Britain, Connecticut, U.S.	
37	Win	26–8–3	Douglas Rhone	KO	3 (10)	Jan 7, 1946	Valley Arena, Holyoke, Massachusetts, U.S.	
36	Loss	25–8–3	Aaron Wade	SD	10	Oct 1, 1945	Coliseum, Baltimore, Maryland, U.S.	
35	Win	25–7–3	Mario Raul Ochoa	UD	10	Sep 24, 1945	Valley Arena, Holyoke, Massachusetts, U.S.	
34	Loss	24–7–3	Holman Williams	PTS	12	Aug 31, 1945	Coliseum Arena, New Orleans, Louisiana, U.S.	
33	Draw	24–6–3	Holman Williams	PTS	10	Aug 17, 1945	Coliseum Arena, New Orleans, Louisiana, U.S.	
32	Win	24–6–2	Ellis Stewart	KO	9 (10)	Aug 6, 1945	Coliseum, Baltimore, Maryland, U.S.	
31	Win	23–6–2	Deacon Logan	TKO	10 (10)	Jul 9, 1945	Coliseum Arena, New Orleans, Louisiana, U.S.	
30	Win	22–6–2	Anthony Jones	PTS	10	Jul 2, 1945	Coliseum Arena, New Orleans, Louisiana, U.S.	
29	Win	21–6–2	Joe Reddick	PTS	10	Jun 25, 1945	Newark, New Jersey, U.S.	
28	Loss	20–6–2	Walter Woods	PTS	10	Jun 8, 1945	Boston Garden, Massachusetts, U.S.	
27	Win	20–5–2	Lige Drew	UD	10	May 28, 1945	Valley Arena, Holyoke, Massachusetts, U.S.	
26	Win	19–5–2	Mayhew Smith	TKO	4 (10)	May 21, 1945	Valley Arena, Holyoke, Massachusetts, U.S.	
25	Loss	18–5–2	Jake LaMotta	SD	10	Apr 27, 1945	Boston Garden, Massachusetts, U.S.	
24	Win	18–4–2	Joe Reddick	PTS	10	Apr 20, 1945	Elk's Auditorium, Providence, Rhode Island, U.S.	
23	Win	17–4–2	Johnny Ryan	KO	3 (10)	Apr 12, 1945	Mechanics Building, Massachusetts, U.S.	
22	Win	16–4–2	Jimmy Hayden	TKO	3 (10)	Apr 4, 1945	Worcester, Massachusetts, U.S.	
21	Win	15–4–2	Johnny Finazzo	UD	10	Mar 1, 1945	Mechanics Building, Boston, Massachusetts, U.S.	
20	Win	14–4–2	Charley Jones	DQ	9 (10)	Feb 26, 1945	Rhode Island Auditorium, Providence, Rhode Island, U.S.	
19	Win	13–4–2	Coolidge Miller	PTS	10	Feb 19, 1945	Providence, Rhode Island, U.S.	
18	Loss	12–4–2	Henryk Chmielewski	SD	10	Feb 5, 1945	Boston Garden, Boston, Massachusetts, U.S.	
17	Win	12–3–2	Van McNutt	UD	10	Jan 12, 1945	Boston Garden, Boston, Massachusetts, U.S.	
16	Win	11–3–2	Henry Jordan	RTD	3 (8)	Jan 6, 1945	Ridgewood Grove, New York City, New York, U.S.	
15	Loss	10–3–2	Henryk Chmielewski	UD	10	Jan 4, 1945	Mechanics Building, Boston, Massachusetts, U.S.	
14	Win	10–2–2	Johnny Brown	RTD	7 (10)	Dec 11, 1944	Laurel Garden, Newark, New Jersey, U.S.	
13	Loss	9–2–2	Johnny Finazzo	SD	10	Nov 17, 1944	Mechanics Hall, Worcester, Massachusetts, U.S.	
12	Win	9–1–2	Ossie Stewart	PTS	8	Nov 13, 1944	Arena, Philadelphia, Pennsylvania, U.S.	
11	Draw	8–1–2	Berlie Lanier	PTS	10	Nov 3, 1944	Mechanics Hall, Worcester, Massachusetts, U.S.	
10	Win	8–1–1	George Brown	PTS	8	Oct 30, 1944	Laurel Garden, Newark, New Jersey, U.S.	
9	Win	7–1–1	Rudy Giscombe	PTS	8	Oct 16, 1944	Laurel Garden, Newark, New Jersey, U.S.	
8	Win	6–1–1	Coolidge Miller	PTS	10	Sep 29, 1944	Mechanics Hall, Worcester, Massachusetts, U.S.	
7	Draw	5–1–1	Coolidge Miller	PTS	10	Sep 15, 1944	Mechanics Hall, Worcester, Massachusetts, U.S.	
6	Win	5–1	Bob Wade	UD	10	Sep 1, 1944	Mechanics Hall, Worcester, Massachusetts, U.S.	
5	Win	4–1	Bob Wade	PTS	10	Aug 18, 1944	Mechanics Hall, Worcester, Massachusetts, U.S.	
4	Win	3–1	Verne Patterson	TKO	5 (10)	Aug 4, 1944	Mechanics Hall, Worcester, Massachusetts, U.S.	
3	Win	2–1	Lew Perez	KO	4 (6)	Jul 31, 1944	Meadowbrook Bowl, Newark, New Jersey, U.S.	
2	Win	1–1	Joe Curcio	PTS	6	Jul 24, 1944	Meadowbrook Bowl, Newark, New Jersey, U.S.	
1	Loss	0–1	Artie Towne	PTS	6	Jul 17, 1944	Meadowbrook Bowl, Newark, New Jersey, U.S.	
