= Holman Williams =

American boxer (1915–1967)

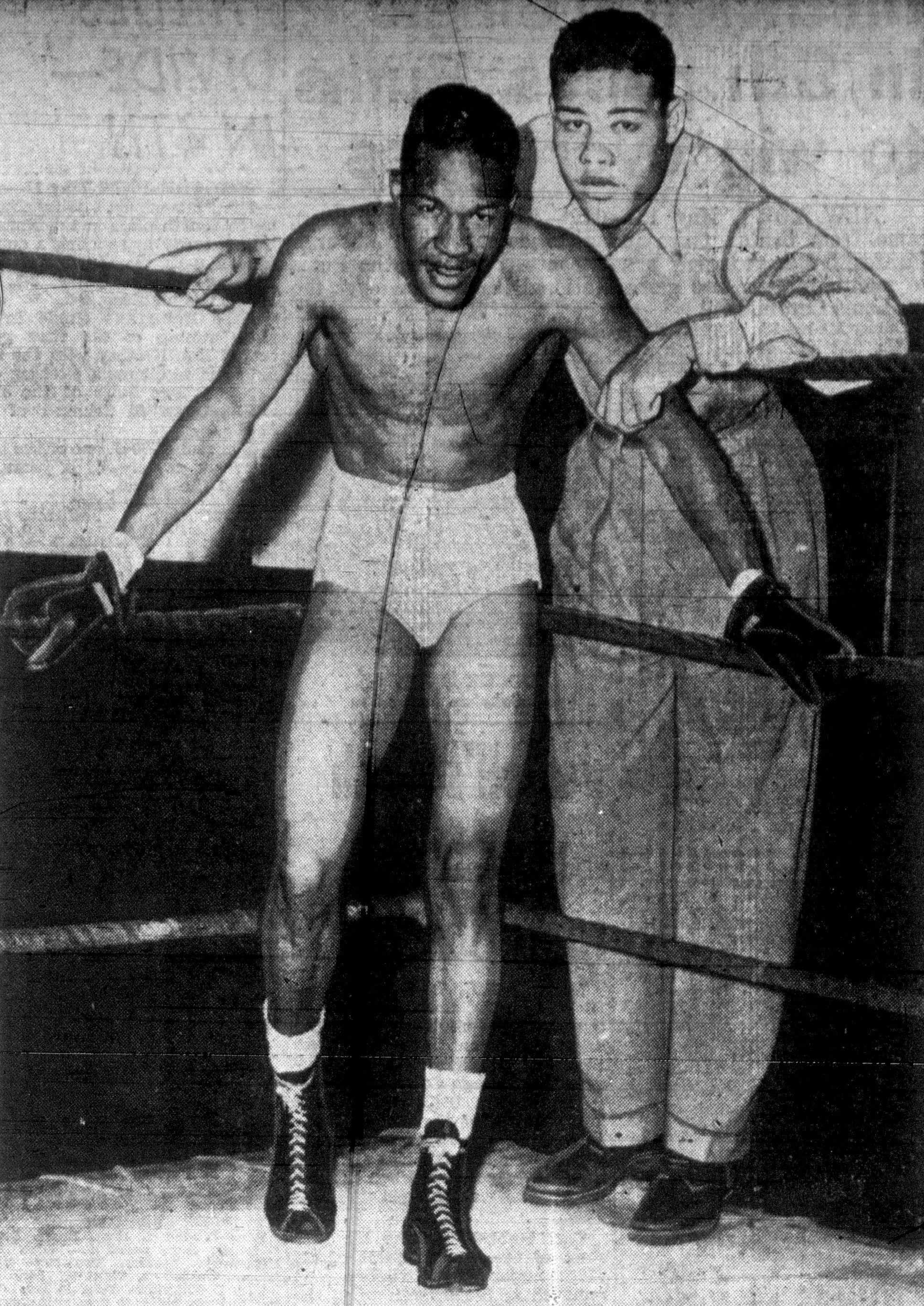
- Williams (left) with Joe Louis (right), circa 1943

Personal information
- Nationality: American
- Born: January 30, 1915 Pensacola, Florida
- Died: July 15, 1967 (aged 49)
- Height: 5 ft 10 1/2 in (1.79 m)
- Weight: Middleweight; Welterweight

Boxing career
- Reach: 71 in (180 cm)
- Stance: Orthodox

Boxing record
- Total fights: 189
- Wins: 146
- Win by KO: 36
- Losses: 31
- Draws: 11
- No contests: 1

Holman Williams (January 30, 1915 in Pensacola, Florida – July 15, 1967) was a world welterweight and middleweight boxing contender. Williams is a member of the infamous Murderers' Row, a group of highly skilled black fighters who were never able to get a world title shot.

== Boxing career ==
Williams began boxing as an amateur bantamweight in 1928, compiling a successful 38-bout amateur career. Shortly before turning professional in 1932, he finished as the featherweight runner-up at the United States National Championships. Williams made his professional debut later that year as a featherweight and eventually earned recognition as one of the cleverest welterweights and middleweights of his era.

In his career Williams fought in the Lightweight, welterweight and middleweight divisions, he fought notable champions and contenders such as Cocoa Kid, Charley Burley, Eddie Booker, Bob Satterfield, Archie Moore, Marcel Cerdan and Jake LaMotta.

When the World Colored Middleweight Championship was revived in the early 1940s, Charley Burley, who had been the colored welterweight champ, fought Williams for the title on 14 August 1942. Burley won on a 9th-round TKO, the first time Williams was stopped in his career. Williams won the title on a decision in their rematch on 16 October 1942, then lost the title on 15 January 1943 to the Cocoa Kid in a 12-round decision.

Williams retired with a record of 146–31–11 with 36 knockouts with 1 no contest.

== Death ==
On July 15, 1967 Williams was killed in a fire while asleep in the club where he worked.

== Honors ==
Williams was elected into the World Boxing Hall of Fame in 1996 and elected into the International Boxing Hall of Fame in 2008.

== Professional boxing record ==
189 fights	146 wins	31 losses
By knockout	36	3
By decision	110	28
Draws	11	
No contests	1	

No.	Result	Record	Opponent	Type	Round	Date	Location	Notes
189	Loss	146–31–11 (1)	Daniel James	PTS	10	Jun 30, 1948	Mucurapo Stadium, Port-of-Spain, Trinidad And Tobago	
188	Loss	146–30–11 (1)	Jose Basora	TKO	4 (10)	Mar 3, 1948	Ashland Blvd. Auditorium, Chicago, Illinois, U.S.	
187	Win	146–29–11 (1)	O'Neill Bell	SD	10	Nov 28, 1947	Olympia Stadium, Detroit, Michigan, U.S.	
186	Loss	145–29–11 (1)	Jose Basora	PTS	10	Nov 3, 1947	Sixto Escobar Stadium, San Juan, Puerto Rico	
185	Loss	145–28–11 (1)	Bert Lytell	UD	12	Jul 4, 1947	Pelican Stadium, New Orleans, Louisiana, U.S.	
184	Loss	145–27–11 (1)	Jean Walzack	UD	10	May 18, 1947	Palais des Sports, Paris, Paris, France	
183	Win	145–26–11 (1)	Henry Hall	UD	12	Mar 28, 1947	Coliseum Arena, New Orleans, Louisiana, U.S.	
182	Draw	144–26–11 (1)	Henry Hall	PTS	10	Mar 14, 1947	Coliseum Arena, New Orleans, Louisiana, U.S.	
181	Loss	144–26–10 (1)	Henry Brimm	SD	10	Feb 25, 1947	Memorial Auditorium, Buffalo, New York, U.S.	
180	Win	144–25–10 (1)	Wylie Burns	UD	8	Jan 23, 1947	Metropolitan Opera House, Philadelphia, Pennsylvania, U.S.	
179	Win	143–25–10 (1)	Deacon Johnny Brown	UD	10	Nov 25, 1946	Turner's Arena, Washington, D.C., U.S.	
178	Loss	142–25–10 (1)	Sam Baroudi	SD	10	Oct 14, 1946	St. Nicholas Arena, New York City, New York, U.S.	
177	Win	142–24–10 (1)	Eddie O'Neill	UD	10	Sep 17, 1946	Arena Gardens, Detroit, Detroit, Michigan, U.S.	
176	Loss	141–24–10 (1)	Jake LaMotta	UD	10	Aug 7, 1946	University of Detroit Stadium, Detroit, Michigan, U.S.	
175	Loss	141–23–10 (1)	Marcel Cerdan	PTS	10	Jul 7, 1946	Stade Roland Garros, Paris, Paris, France	
174	Win	141–22–10 (1)	Bob Satterfield	SD	10	Apr 25, 1946	Coliseum, Chicago, Illinois, U.S.	
173	Loss	140–22–10 (1)	Bert Lytell	UD	10	Apr 15, 1946	Valley Arena, Holyoke, Massachusetts, U.S.	
172	Win	140–21–10 (1)	Johnny Carter	TKO	7 (10)	Apr 4, 1946	Coliseum Annex, Chicago, Illinois, U.S.	
171	Win	139–21–10 (1)	George Henry	PTS	10	Feb 14, 1946	Coliseum North Hall, Chicago, Illinois, U.S.	
170	Win	138–21–10 (1)	Aaron Wade	KO	4 (10)	Feb 4, 1946	St. Nicholas Arena, New York City, New York, U.S.	
169	Win	137–21–10 (1)	Butch Lynch	TKO	3 (10)	Jan 24, 1946	Coliseum North Hall, Chicago, Illinois, U.S.	
168	Loss	136–21–10 (1)	Archie Moore	TKO	11 (12)	Nov 26, 1945	Coliseum, Baltimore, Maryland, U.S.	
167	Win	136–20–10 (1)	Archie Moore	MD	10	Oct 22, 1945	Coliseum, Baltimore, Maryland, U.S.	
166	Win	135–20–10 (1)	Len Wadsworth	UD	10	Oct 10, 1945	Windsor Arena, Windsor, Ontario, Canada	
165	Win	134–20–10 (1)	Sampson Powell	UD	10	Oct 2, 1945	Memorial Auditorium, Buffalo, New York, U.S.	
164	Win	133–20–10 (1)	Berlie Lanier	UD	10	Sep 27, 1945	Armory, Akron, Ohio, U.S.	
163	Win	132–20–10 (1)	Bert Lytell	PTS	12	Aug 31, 1945	Coliseum Arena, New Orleans, Louisiana, U.S.	
162	Win	131–20–10 (1)	Forest Gee	KO	6 (10)	Aug 22, 1945	Denver, Colorado, U.S.	
161	Draw	130–20–10 (1)	Bert Lytell	PTS	10	Aug 17, 1945	Coliseum Arena, New Orleans, Louisiana, U.S.	
160	Win	130–20–9 (1)	Johnny Green	UD	10	Aug 1, 1945	Memorial Auditorium, Buffalo, New York, U.S.	
159	Win	129–20–9 (1)	Charley Burley	UD	12	Jul 11, 1945	Civic Stadium, Buffalo, New York, U.S.	
158	Win	128–20–9 (1)	Sampson Powell	UD	10	May 28, 1945	Arcadia Gardens, Detroit, Michigan, U.S.	
157	Win	127–20–9 (1)	Joe Carter	PTS	15	May 20, 1945	Pelican Stadium, New Orleans, Louisiana, U.S.	
156	Win	126–20–9 (1)	Herbert Lewis Hardwick	UD	12	May 14, 1945	Coliseum, Baltimore, Maryland, U.S.	
155	Win	125–20–9 (1)	Prentiss Hall	UD	8	May 8, 1945	Memorial Auditorium, Buffalo, New York, U.S.	
154	Win	124–20–9 (1)	Oscar Boyd	UD	10	Apr 24, 1945	Memorial Auditorium, Buffalo, New York, U.S.	
153	Loss	123–20–9 (1)	Herbert Lewis Hardwick	SD	10	Mar 26, 1945	St. Nicholas Arena, New York City, New York, U.S.	
152	Draw	123–19–9 (1)	Joe Carter	PTS	10	Dec 22, 1944	Coliseum Arena, New Orleans, Louisiana, U.S.	
151	Win	123–19–8 (1)	Kid Tunero	UD	10	Nov 6, 1944	Coliseum, Baltimore, Maryland, U.S.	
150	Win	122–19–8 (1)	Aaron Wade	PTS	10	Oct 11, 1944	Auditorium, Oakland, California, U.S.	
149	Draw	121–19–8 (1)	Jose Basora	PTS	10	Oct 2, 1944	Convention Hall, Philadelphia, Pennsylvania, U.S.	
148	Draw	121–19–7 (1)	Herbert Lewis Hardwick	PTS	12	Sep 15, 1944	Coliseum Arena, New Orleans, Louisiana, U.S.	For vacant duration middleweight title
147	Win	121–19–6 (1)	Joe Reddick	UD	10	Aug 14, 1944	Coliseum, Baltimore, Maryland, U.S.	
146	Win	120–19–6 (1)	Anthony Jones	PTS	10	Jul 21, 1944	Coliseum Arena, New Orleans, Louisiana, U.S.	
145	Win	119–19–6 (1)	Lloyd Marshall	MD	10	Jul 11, 1944	Griffith Stadium, Washington, D.C., U.S.	
144	Loss	118–19–6 (1)	Lloyd Marshall	PTS	10	Jun 7, 1944	Auditorium, Oakland, California, U.S.	
143	Win	118–18–6 (1)	Jack Chase	PTS	12	May 24, 1944	Auditorium, Oakland, California, U.S.	
142	Win	117–18–6 (1)	Paul Lewis	PTS	10	May 10, 1944	Auditorium, Oakland, California, U.S.	
141	Win	116–18–6 (1)	Jack Chase	PTS	15	Apr 27, 1944	City Auditorium, Denver, Colorado, U.S.	
140	Win	115–18–6 (1)	Jose Basora	PTS	10	Apr 10, 1944	Civic Auditorium, San Francisco, California, U.S.	
139	Win	114–18–6 (1)	Battling Monroe	PTS	10	Mar 17, 1944	Civic Auditorium, San Francisco, California, U.S.	
138	Loss	113–18–6 (1)	Eddie Booker	PTS	10	Mar 6, 1944	Civic Auditorium, San Francisco, California, U.S.	
137	Win	113–17–6 (1)	Jack Chase	PTS	12	Feb 21, 1944	Civic Auditorium, San Francisco, California, U.S.	
136	Win	112–17–6 (1)	Jack Chase	PTS	10	Feb 7, 1944	Civic Auditorium, San Francisco, California, U.S.	
135	Win	111–17–6 (1)	Young Gene Buffalo	PTS	10	Jan 24, 1944	Turner's Arena, Washington, D.C., U.S.	
134	Win	110–17–6 (1)	Tommy Hubert	UD	10	Jan 11, 1944	Turner's Arena, Washington, D.C., U.S.	
133	Win	109–17–6 (1)	Steve Belloise	PTS	10	Dec 6, 1943	Arena, Philadelphia, Pennsylvania, U.S.	
132	Win	108–17–6 (1)	Eddie Booker	PTS	12	Nov 19, 1943	Civic Auditorium, San Francisco, California, U.S.	
131	Win	107–17–6 (1)	Joe Carter	UD	10	Oct 11, 1943	Coliseum, Baltimore, Maryland, U.S.	
130	Win	106–17–6 (1)	John Garner	PTS	10	Sep 27, 1943	Turner's Arena, Washington, D.C., U.S.	
129	Win	105–17–6 (1)	Lloyd Marshall	PTS	10	Sep 3, 1943	Coliseum Arena, New Orleans, Louisiana, U.S.	
128	Loss	104–17–6 (1)	Jose Basora	SD	10	Aug 9, 1943	Arena Stadium, Philadelphia, Pennsylvania, U.S.	
127	Loss	104–16–6 (1)	Kid Tunero	PTS	10	Jul 31, 1943	Arena Cristal, Havana, Cuba	
126	NC	104–15–6 (1)	Charley Burley	NC	10 (10)	May 14, 1943	Legion Stadium, Hollywood, California, U.S.	The referee declared the fight no contest after one minute of the 10th round because of inactivity
125	Win	104–15–6	Roosevelt Thomas	PTS	10	May 3, 1943	Laurel Garden, Newark, New Jersey, U.S.	
124	Win	103–15–6	Mario Raul Ochoa	PTS	10	Apr 3, 1943	Arena Cristal, Havana, Cuba	
123	Win	102–15–6	Anthony Jones	PTS	10	Mar 26, 1943	Victory Arena, New Orleans, Louisiana, U.S.	
122	Win	101–15–6	Joe Carter	PTS	10	Mar 15, 1943	Laurel Garden, Newark, New Jersey, U.S.	
121	Win	100–15–6	Roosevelt Thomas	PTS	10	Feb 19, 1943	Victory Arena, New Orleans, Louisiana, U.S.	
120	Win	99–15–6	Harold Smith	PTS	10	Jan 24, 1943	Victory Arena, New Orleans, Louisiana, U.S.	
119	Loss	98–15–6	Herbert Lewis Hardwick	PTS	12	Jan 15, 1943	Victory Arena, New Orleans, Louisiana, U.S.	Lost world colored middleweight title
118	Win	98–14–6	RJ Lewis	PTS	12	Dec 13, 1942	Victory Arena, New Orleans, Louisiana, U.S.	
117	Win	97–14–6	Charley Burley	UD	15	Oct 16, 1942	Municipal Auditorium, New Orleans, Louisiana, U.S.	Won world colored middleweight title
116	Loss	96–14–6	Charley Burley	TKO	9 (15)	Aug 14, 1942	Victory Arena, New Orleans, Louisiana, U.S.	For vacant world colored middleweight title
115	Win	96–13–6	Johnny Jackson	PTS	10	Jul 27, 1942	Legion Field, Baton Rouge, Louisiana, U.S.	
114	Win	95–13–6	Lorenzo Strickland	PTS	10	Jul 24, 1942	Victory Arena, New Orleans, Louisiana, U.S.	
113	Win	94–13–6	Randy Brown	KO	5 (10)	Jul 10, 1942	Victory Arena, New Orleans, Louisiana, U.S.	
112	Loss	93–13–6	Charley Burley	PTS	10	Jun 23, 1942	Crosley Field, Cincinnati, Ohio, U.S.	
111	Win	93–12–6	Kid Tunero	UD	12	Apr 27, 1942	Coliseum, Baltimore, Maryland, U.S.	
110	Loss	92–12–6	Herbert Lewis Hardwick	PTS	6	Mar 27, 1942	Madison Square Garden, New York City, New York, U.S.	
109	Win	92–11–6	Kid Tunero	UD	12	Mar 9, 1942	Coliseum, Baltimore, Maryland, U.S.	
108	Loss	91–11–6	Herbert Lewis Hardwick	UD	15	Mar 2, 1942	Coliseum, Baltimore, Maryland, U.S.	
107	Loss	91–10–6	Charley Burley	UD	10	Feb 26, 1942	Armory, Minneapolis, Minnesota, U.S.	
106	Win	91–9–6	Herbert Lewis Hardwick	UD	12	Jan 19, 1942	Coliseum, Baltimore, Maryland, U.S.	
105	Win	90–9–6	Jose Basora	PTS	6	Jan 9, 1942	Madison Square Garden, New York City, New York, U.S.	
104	Draw	89–9–6	Herbert Lewis Hardwick	SD	10	Dec 22, 1941	Coliseum, Baltimore, Maryland, U.S.	
103	Win	89–9–5	Howell King	PTS	10	Nov 21, 1941	Coliseum Arena, New Orleans, Louisiana, U.S.	
102	Win	88–9–5	Ernest Robinson	PTS	10	Nov 7, 1941	Coliseum Arena, New Orleans, Louisiana, U.S.	
101	Win	87–9–5	Rand Jackson	PTS	10	Oct 31, 1941	Coliseum Arena, New Orleans, Louisiana, U.S.	
100	Win	86–9–5	Raul Carabantes	PTS	6	Oct 6, 1941	Madison Square Garden, New York City, New York, U.S.	
99	Win	85–9–5	Jose Basora	PTS	6	Sep 29, 1941	Polo Grounds, New York City, New York, U.S.	
98	Win	84–9–5	Jack Dubois	KO	6 (10)	Jul 28, 1941	Bridgeport, Ohio, U.S.	
97	Win	83–9–5	Antonio Fernandez	PTS	6	Jun 18, 1941	Polo Grounds, New York City, New York, U.S.	
96	Win	82–9–5	Jimmy Leto	PTS	6	May 23, 1941	Griffith Stadium, Washington, D.C., U.S.	
95	Win	81–9–5	Antonio Fernandez	PTS	8	May 13, 1941	Convention Hall, Philadelphia, Pennsylvania, U.S.	
94	Win	80–9–5	Young Gene Buffalo	UD	10	Mar 27, 1941	Coliseum, Baltimore, Maryland, U.S.	
93	Win	79–9–5	Young Gene Buffalo	PTS	8	Mar 21, 1941	Olympia Stadium, Detroit, Michigan, U.S.	
92	Win	78–9–5	Frankie Britt	TKO	4 (6)	Feb 17, 1941	Convention Hall, Philadelphia, Pennsylvania, U.S.	
91	Win	77–9–5	Ernest Robinson	PTS	6	Jan 31, 1941	Madison Square Garden, New York City, New York, U.S.	
90	Win	76–9–5	Frankie Britt	UD	6	Dec 16, 1940	Boston Garden, Boston, Massachusetts, U.S.	
89	Win	75–9–5	Mansfield Driskell	TKO	6 (8)	Dec 6, 1940	Olympia Stadium, Detroit, Michigan, U.S.	
88	Win	74–9–5	Eddie Dolan	SD	10	Oct 29, 1940	Town Hall, Scranton, Pennsylvania, U.S.	
87	Loss	73–9–5	Izzy Jannazzo	PTS	10	Sep 4, 1940	Griffith Stadium, Washington, D.C., U.S.	
86	Win	73–8–5	Bill McDowell	PTS	10	Jul 29, 1940	Griffith Stadium, Washington, D.C., U.S.	
85	Win	72–8–5	Vinnie Vines	TKO	4 (6)	Jul 17, 1940	Polo Grounds, New York City, New York, U.S.	
84	Win	71–8–5	Milo Theodorescu	UD	10	Jul 4, 1940	Coliseum, Baltimore, Maryland, U.S.	
83	Win	70–8–5	Joe Legon	PTS	6	Jun 20, 1940	Yankee Stadium, Bronx, New York City, New York, U.S.	
82	Win	69–8–5	Johnny Durso	TKO	4 (6)	Jun 5, 1940	Olympia Stadium, Detroit, Pennsylvania, U.S.	
81	Win	68–8–5	Izzy Jannazzo	UD	10	Mar 27, 1940	Watres Armory, Scranton, Pennsylvania, U.S.	
80	Win	67–8–5	Eddie Dolan	PTS	10	Feb 2, 1940	Fair Grounds Coliseum, Detroit, Michigan, U.S.	
79	Win	66–8–5	Steve Mamakos	PTS	12	Jan 25, 1940	Coliseum, Baltimore, Maryland, U.S.	
78	Loss	65–8–5	Herbert Lewis Hardwick	UD	15	Jan 11, 1940	Coliseum, Baltimore, Maryland U.S.	For vacant world colored welterweight title
77	Draw	65–7–5	Izzy Jannazzo	PTS	10	Dec 13, 1939	Watres Armory, Scranton, Pennsylvania, U.S.	
76	Win	65–7–4	Charley Burley	PTS	15	Dec 1, 1939	Coliseum Arena, New Orleans, Louisiana, U.S.	
75	Win	64–7–4	Tommy Mollis	KO	3 (10)	Oct 27, 1939	Coliseum Arena, New Orleans, Louisiana, U.S.	
74	Win	63–7–4	Carl Dell	PTS	6	Oct 2, 1939	Madison Square Garden, New York City, New York, U.S.	
73	Win	62–7–4	Young Gene Buffalo	TKO	6 (10)	Aug 4, 1939	Coliseum Arena, New Orleans, Louisiana, U.S.	
72	Win	61–7–4	Johnny Jackson	PTS	10	Jul 14, 1939	Coliseum Arena, New Orleans, Louisiana, U.S.	
71	Win	60–7–4	Ralph Gizzy	KO	4 (10)	May 30, 1939	Clarksburg, West Virginia, U.S.	
70	Win	59–7–4	Bobby Seaman	PTS	6	Apr 17, 1939	Wrigley Field, Los Angeles, California, U.S.	
69	Win	58–7–4	Jackie Burke	UD	10	Mar 21, 1939	Watres Armory, Scranton, Pennsylvania, U.S.	
68	Win	57–7–4	Andre Jessurun	PTS	10	Feb 20, 1939	Motor Square Garden, Pittsburgh, Pennsylvania, U.S.	
67	Win	56–7–4	Francesco Montanari	UD	10	Feb 7, 1939	Watres Armory, Scranton, Pennsylvania, U.S.	
66	Draw	55–7–4	Eddie Booker	PTS	6	Jan 25, 1939	Madison Square Garden, New York City, New York, U.S.	
65	Win	55–7–3	Wildcat O'Connor	UD	10	Jan 18, 1939	Watres Armory, Scranton, Pennsylvania, U.S.	
64	Draw	54–7–3	Tony Rock	PTS	4	Nov 25, 1938	Madison Square Garden, New York City, New York, U.S.	
63	Win	54–7–2	Johnny Jackson	UD	10	Oct 14, 1938	City Park Baseball Field, Baton Rouge, Louisiana, U.S.	
62	Loss	53–7–2	Michele Palermo	PTS	10	Jul 11, 1938	Carlin's Park, Baltimore, Maryland, U.S.	
61	Win	53–6–2	Jack Portney	UD	10	Jun 6, 1938	Carlin's Park, Baltimore, Maryland, U.S.	
60	Win	52–6–2	Paulie Walker	UD	10	May 16, 1938	Carlin's Park, Baltimore, Maryland, U.S.	
59	Win	51–6–2	Saverio Turiello	PTS	10	Apr 25, 1938	Carlin's Park, Baltimore, Maryland, U.S.	
58	Win	50–6–2	Jimmy Berres	PTS	6	Feb 9, 1938	Civic Auditorium, San Francisco, California, U.S.	
57	Win	49–6–2	Manuel Victoria	PTS	6	Jan 11, 1938	Olympic Auditorium, Los Angeles, California, U.S.	
56	Win	48–6–2	Remo Fernandez	PTS	10	Oct 29, 1937	White City Arena, Chicago, Illinois, U.S.	
55	Win	47–6–2	Young Gene Buffalo	PTS	10	Oct 22, 1937	Coliseum Arena, New Orleans, Louisiana, U.S.	
54	Win	46–6–2	Tony Rock	PTS	10	Oct 11, 1937	Duquesne Garden, Pittsburgh, Pennsylvania, U.S.	
53	Win	45–6–2	Penna Randezell	RTD	3 (8)	Oct 5, 1937	Riverview Rink, Milwaukee, Wisconsin, U.S.	
52	Win	44–6–2	Remo Fernandez	PTS	8	Oct 1, 1937	White City Arena, Chicago, Illinois, U.S.	
51	Win	43–6–2	Gallito Ramirez	TKO	3 (10)	Sep 24, 1937	White City Arena, Chicago, Illinois, U.S.	
50	Win	42–6–2	Vince Pimpinella	PTS	8	Sep 2, 1937	Madison Square Garden, New York City, New York, U.S.	
49	Win	41–6–2	Paulie Walker	PTS	8	Aug 5, 1937	Madison Square Garden, New York City, New York, U.S.	
48	Win	40–6–2	Johnny Lucas	PTS	10	Jul 6, 1937	Hickey Park, Millvale, Pennsylvania, U.S.	
47	Loss	39–6–2	Herbert Lewis Hardwick	PTS	15	Jun 11, 1937	Coliseum Arena, New Orleans, Louisiana, U.S.	For world colored welterweight title
46	Win	39–5–2	Bobby Pacho	UD	10	Apr 19, 1937	Motor Square Garden, Pittsburgh, Pennsylvania, U.S.	
45	Win	38–5–2	Slugger White	KO	4 (10)	Mar 22, 1937	Coliseum Arena, New Orleans, Louisiana, U.S.	
44	Win	37–5–2	Herbert Lewis Hardwick	PTS	12	Mar 12, 1937	Coliseum Arena, New Orleans, Louisiana, U.S.	
43	Loss	36–5–2	Johnny Lucas	PTS	8	Feb 8, 1937	Convention Hall, Philadelphia, Pennsylvania, U.S.	
42	Win	36–4–2	Joe Nealon	UD	8	Jan 28, 1937	Watres Armory, Scranton, Pennsylvania, U.S.	
41	Win	35–4–2	Tony Falco	PTS	10	Jan 4, 1937	Convention Hall, Philadelphia, Pennsylvania, U.S.	
40	Win	34–4–2	Ray Nash	TKO	3 (6)	Nov 28, 1936	Rockland Palace, New York City, New York, U.S.	
39	Win	33–4–2	Wesley Martin	TKO	5 (10)	Oct 19, 1936	Islam Grotto, Pittsburgh, Pennsylvania, U.S.	
38	Draw	32–4–2	Richie Fontaine	PTS	10	Oct 5, 1936	Madison Square Garden, New York City, New York, U.S.	
37	Win	32–4–1	Roger Shea	TKO	2 (8)	Aug 31, 1936	Hickey Park, Millvale, Pennsylvania, U.S.	
36	Loss	31–4–1	Herbert Lewis Hardwick	PTS	10	Apr 17, 1936	Coliseum Arena, New Orleans, Louisiana, U.S.	
35	Loss	31–3–1	Herbert Lewis Hardwick	MD	10	Mar 13, 1936	Coliseum Arena, New Orleans, Louisiana, U.S.	
34	Win	31–2–1	Andy Bundy	PTS	8	Oct 31, 1935	Arena, Saint Louis, Missouri, U.S.	
33	Win	30–2–1	Chuck Woods	PTS	10	Oct 2, 1935	Olympia Stadium, Detroit, Michigan, U.S.	
32	Win	29–2–1	Lew Massey	UD	10	Aug 28, 1935	Mills Stadium, Chicago, Illinois, U.S.	
31	Win	28–2–1	Baby Tiger Flowers	TKO	8 (15)	Jul 2, 1935	Comiskey Park, Chicago, Illinois, U.S.	Won vacant Negro lightweight title
30	Win	27–2–1	Darcey White	PTS	12	May 31, 1935	Coliseum Arena, New Orleans, Louisiana, U.S.	
29	Win	26–2–1	Wesley Farrell	TKO	8 (15)	May 17, 1935	Coliseum Arena, New Orleans, Louisiana, U.S.	
28	Win	25–2–1	Wesley Farrell	UD	10	Apr 5, 1935	Coliseum Arena, New Orleans, Louisiana, U.S.	
27	Win	24–2–1	Tommy Paul	PTS	10	Mar 22, 1935	Arena Gardens, Detroit, Michigan, U.S.	
26	Win	23–2–1	Billy Vaughn	PTS	8	Feb 26, 1935	Auditorium, Milwaukee, Wisconsin, U.S.	
25	Win	22–2–1	Billy Mack	KO	4 (8)	Feb 18, 1935	Midway Arena, Chicago, Illinois, U.S.	
24	Win	21–2–1	Harry Booker	TKO	4 (8)	Feb 11, 1935	Midway Arena, Chicago, Illinois, U.S.	
23	Win	20–2–1	Harry Booker	PTS	8	Jan 14, 1935	Midway Arena, Chicago, Illinois, U.S.	
22	Win	19–2–1	Lee Sheppard	KO	2 (8)	Jan 7, 1935	Midway Arena, Chicago, Illinois, U.S.	
21	Win	18–2–1	Eddie Carroll	TKO	2 (6)	Jan 1, 1935	Auditorium, Milwaukee, Wisconsin, U.S.	
20	Win	17–2–1	Charlie Bochio	TKO	6 (8)	Dec 6, 1934	Auditorium, Milwaukee, Wisconsin, U.S.	
19	Win	16–2–1	Battling Gizzy	TKO	1 (6)	Nov 9, 1934	Auditorium, Milwaukee, Wisconsin, U.S.	
18	Win	15–2–1	Tommy Corbett	TKO	3 (6)	Oct 11, 1934	Auditorium, Milwaukee, Wisconsin, U.S.	
17	Win	14–2–1	Chick Watson	KO	3 (?)	May 4, 1934	Detroit, Michigan, U.S.	
16	Draw	13–2–1	Harry Robertson	PTS	6	Feb 16, 1934	Hazel Park Arena, Detroit, Michigan, U.S.	
15	Win	13–2	Cecil Lothery	PTS	6	Feb 14, 1934	Mount Clemens, Michigan, U.S.	
14	Win	12–2	Billy Moore	KO	2 (?)	Jan 26, 1934	Detroit, Michigan, U.S.	
13	Win	11–2	Frankie Pallo	KO	3 (6)	Nov 24, 1933	Hazel Park Arena, Detroit, Michigan, U.S.	
12	Win	10–2	Joe Gerace	PTS	10	Oct 30, 1933	Saginaw, Michigan, U.S.	
11	Win	9–2	Mickey O'Brien	KO	3 (6)	Oct 13, 1933	Hazel Park Arena, Detroit, Michigan, U.S.	
10	Win	8–2	Wilbur Chevalier	PTS	8	Aug 30, 1933	Outdoor Arena, Mount Clemens, Michigan, U.S.	
9	Win	7–2	Jack Dombrowski	PTS	6	Aug 24, 1933	Detroit, Michigan, U.S.	
8	Win	6–2	Jackie Young	KO	4 (?)	Aug 18, 1933	Detroit, Michigan, U.S.	
7	Loss	5–2	Chuck Woods	PTS	10	May 4, 1933	Naval Armory, Detroit, Michigan, U.S.	
6	Win	5–1	Len Hendrickson	PTS	8	Nov 16, 1932	Arena Gardens, Detroit, Michigan, U.S.	
5	Loss	4–1	Chuck Woods	PTS	8	Oct 12, 1932	Arena Gardens, Detroit, Michigan, U.S.	
4	Win	4–0	Henry Pacer	KO	2 (6)	Oct 10, 1932	Shea Gymnasium, Toledo, Ohio, U.S.	
3	Win	3–0	Eddie Isaacs	PTS	6	Sep 23, 1932	Arena Gardens, Detroit, Michigan, U.S.	
2	Win	2–0	Art Smith	KO	2 (6)	Sep 2, 1932	Arena Gardens, Detroit, Michigan, U.S.	
1	Win	1–0	Joe Lynn	TKO	3 (6)	Aug 12, 1932	State Fairgrounds Arena, Detroit, Michigan, U.S.	

== See also ==
- Murderers' Row (Boxing)

Awards and achievements
Preceded by Charley Burley	World Colored Middleweight Championship; October 16, 1942 – January 15, 1943	Succeeded by Cocoa Kid
