= Lloyd Marshall =

American boxer (1914–1997)

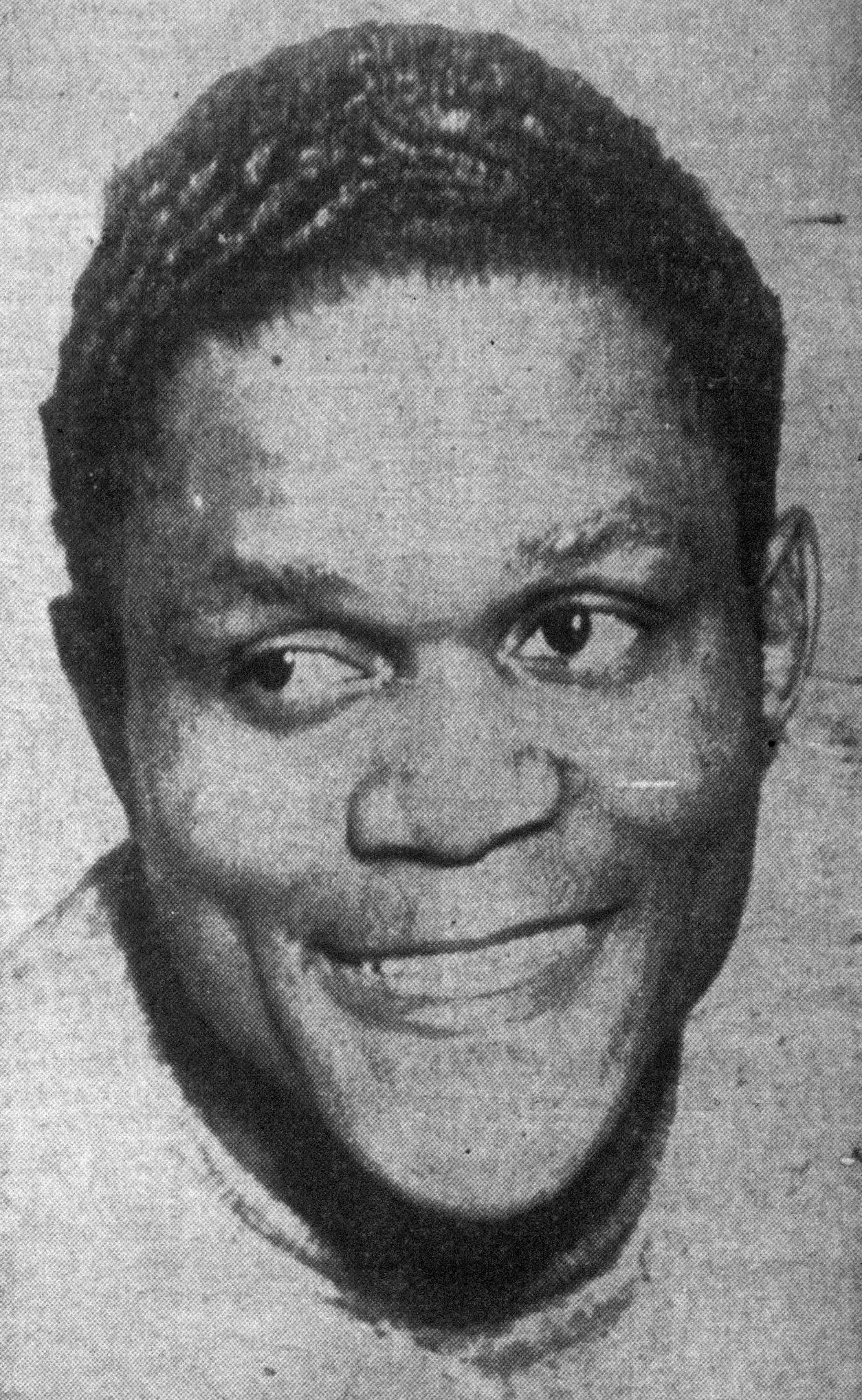
- Marshall, circa 1942

Personal information
- Born: June 4, 1914 Madison County, Georgia, U.S.
- Died: August 4, 1997 (aged 83) Sacramento, California, U.S.
- Height: 5 ft 10 in (1.78 m)
- Weight: Middleweight; Light heavyweight

Boxing career
- Reach: 74 1/2 in (189 cm)
- Stance: Orthodox

Boxing record
- Total fights: 100
- Wins: 71
- Win by KO: 36
- Losses: 25
- Draws: 4

Lloyd Marshall (June 4, 1914 – August 4, 1997) was an American professional boxer who competed from 1936 to 1951. Marshall was a member of the Black Murderers’ Row, a designation for a group of highly skilled African-American boxers active primarily during the 1940s who were often avoided by leading champions of the era. Owing in part to this circumstance, Marshall was never afforded an opportunity to fight for a world championship.

Hall of Fame boxer Archie Moore cited Lloyd Marshall as one of the two hardest punchers he ever fought, a notable assessment given Moore’s bouts with many of the hardest punchers in boxing history. Also known for his heart and ring intelligence, Marshall recorded victories over elite opposition, including Ezzard Charles — widely regarded as one of the greatest pound-for-pound boxers in history — as well as Charley Burley, Lou Brouillard, Jake LaMotta, and Joey Maxim.

In June 2010, Marshall was posthumously inducted into the International Boxing Hall of Fame.

== Pro career ==
Marshall began his boxing career at the age of 17 and became a pro in 1936. In 1943, Marshall fought for the "Duration" Light Heavyweight Title against Jimmy Bivins. During the bout, Bivins was knocked down in the 7th for a 2-count, and then Marshall was down for nine in the 9th, and at the bell in the 12th. Marshall was then counted out in the 13th to lose the bout. In 1944, he captured the Vacant "Duration" World Light Heavyweight Title with a victory over Nate Bolden. Due to the fact that he fought at his peak during World War II, Marshall never fought for an officially recognized world title. He retired at age 37 in 1951 after KO losses to Bobo Olson and then Harry Matthews.

He fought 4 fights against other black murder's row fighters: all within the 2-year period of September 1942- September 1944.

== Honors ==
*Denotes Hall of Famer

Marshall was inducted to World Boxing Hall of Fame in 1996. He was posthumously inducted to the International Boxing Hall of Fame in June 2010.

== Professional boxing record ==
99 fights	70 wins	25 losses
By knockout	36	11
By decision	34	13
By disqualification	0	1
Draws	4	

No.	Result	Record	Opponent	Type	Round	Date	Location	Notes
99	Loss	70–25–4	Harry Matthews	KO	5 (10)	Jul 27, 1951	Civic Ice Arena, Seattle, Washington, U.S.	
98	Loss	70–24–4	Bobo Olson	KO	5 (10)	May 8, 1951	Civic Auditorium, Honolulu, Hawaii	
97	Loss	70–23–4	Don Cockell	KO	1 (10)	Feb 27, 1951	Harringay Arena, Harringay, London, England	
96	Win	70–22–4	Tommy Farr	PTS	10	Dec 4, 1950	Market Hall, Carmarthen, Wales	
95	Loss	69–22–4	Don Cockell	DQ	7 (10)	Nov 14, 1950	Earls Court Arena, Kensington, London, England	
94	Draw	69–21–4	Hans Strelecki	PTS	6	Oct 15, 1950	Rote Erde Stadion, Dortmund, Nordrhein-Westfalen, West Germany	
93	Win	69–21–3	Heinz Sachs	PTS	6	Oct 8, 1950	Waldbuehne, Westend, Berlin, West Germany	
92	Loss	68–21–3	Willi Hoepner	PTS	8	Sep 6, 1950	Planten un Blomen, Hamburg, West Germany	
91	Win	68–20–3	Dietrich Hucks	TKO	7 (10)	Jul 2, 1950	Waldbuehne, Westend, West Berlin, West Germany	
90	Loss	67–20–3	Conny Rux	TKO	3 (10)	May 14, 1950	Waldbuehne, Westend, West Berlin, West Germany	
89	Win	67–19–3	Babe Edwards	TKO	6 (10)	Feb 28, 1950	Civic Auditorium, San Jose, California, U.S.	
88	Win	66–19–3	Frankie Daniels	KO	8 (10)	Feb 15, 1950	Memorial Auditorium, Sacramento, California, U.S.	
87	Loss	65–19–3	Irish Bob Murphy	TKO	4 (10)	Nov 8, 1949	Olympic Auditorium, Los Angeles, California, U.S.	
86	Win	65–18–3	Watson Jones	KO	3 (10)	Oct 24, 1949	Sports Center, Tucson, Arizona, U.S.	
85	Win	64–18–3	John L. Sullivan	TKO	6 (10)	Sep 20, 1949	Auditorium, Portland, Oregon, U.S.	
84	Win	63–18–3	Bob Dunlap	PTS	10	Aug 5, 1949	National Hall, San Francisco, California, U.S.	
83	Loss	62–18–3	Grant Butcher	UD	10	Jun 30, 1949	Edmonds Field, Sacramento, California, U.S.	
82	Loss	62–17–3	Roy Taylor	MD	10	Feb 8, 1949	Memorial Auditorium, Sacramento, California, U.S.	
81	Win	62–16–3	Ernie Rios	TKO	3 (10)	Jun 15, 1948	Memorial Auditorium, Sacramento, California, U.S.	
80	Win	61–16–3	George Millich	UD	10	May 18, 1948	Memorial Auditorium, Sacramento, California, U.S.	
79	Loss	60–16–3	Ezzard Charles	KO	2 (10)	Sep 29, 1947	Crosley Field, Cincinnati, Ohio, U.S.	
78	Win	60–15–3	Freddie Mills	KO	5 (10)	Jun 3, 1947	Harringay Arena, Harringay, London, England	
77	Win	59–15–3	George Henry	PTS	10	Dec 17, 1946	Memorial Auditorium, Sacramento, California, U.S.	
76	Loss	58–15–3	Ezzard Charles	KO	6 (10)	Jul 29, 1946	Crosley Field, Cincinnati, Ohio, U.S.	
75	Loss	58–14–3	Oakland Billy Smith	KO	9 (15)	Mar 20, 1946	Auditorium, Oakland, California, U.S.	For USA California State light heavyweight title
74	Win	58–13–3	Bobby Zander	TKO	5 (10)	Dec 17, 1945	Civic Auditorium, San Francisco, California, U.S.	
73	Win	57–13–3	Nate Bolden	PTS	12	Nov 12, 1945	Civic Auditorium, San Francisco, California, U.S.	
72	Win	56–13–3	Fitzie Fitzpatrick	KO	5 (10)	Sep 24, 1945	Civic Auditorium, San Francisco, California, U.S.	
71	Loss	55–13–3	Archie Moore	TKO	10 (10)	Jun 26, 1945	Lakefront Stadium, Cleveland, Ohio, U.S.	
70	Loss	55–12–3	Archie Moore	UD	10	May 21, 1945	Coliseum, Baltimore, Maryland, U.S.	
69	Win	55–11–3	Willie Barrow	UD	8	Apr 16, 1945	Memorial Auditorium, Buffalo, New York, U.S.	
68	Win	54–11–3	Teddy Randolph	UD	10	Mar 19, 1945	Coliseum, Baltimore, Maryland, U.S.	
67	Win	53–11–3	Joe Carter	SD	10	Oct 18, 1944	Arena, Cleveland, Ohio, U.S.	
66	Win	52–11–3	Jack Chase	UD	10	Sep 30, 1944	Gilmore Stadium, Los Angeles, California, U.S.	
65	Win	51–11–3	Joey Maxim	UD	10	Jul 27, 1944	Lakefront Stadium, Cleveland, Ohio, U.S.	
64	Loss	50–11–3	Holman Williams	MD	10	Jul 11, 1944	Griffith Stadium, Washington, D.C., U.S.	
63	Win	50–10–3	Holman Williams	PTS	10	Jun 7, 1944	Auditorium, Oakland, California, U.S.	
62	Win	49–10–3	Joe Kahut	PTS	10	May 26, 1944	Auditorium, Portland, Oregon, U.S.	
61	Win	48–10–3	Joe Reddick	PTS	10	May 19, 1944	Auditorium, Milwaukee, Wisconsin, U.S.	
60	Win	47–10–3	Jake LaMotta	UD	10	Apr 21, 1944	Arena, Cleveland, Ohio, U.S.	
59	Win	46–10–3	Joe Carter	SD	12	Mar 6, 1944	Coliseum, Baltimore, Maryland, U.S.	
58	Win	45–10–3	Bob Garner	KO	1 (10)	Feb 16, 1944	Auditorium, Milwaukee, Wisconsin, U.S.	
57	Win	44–10–3	Nate Bolden	UD	10	Jan 18, 1944	Arena, Cleveland, Ohio, U.S.	Won vacant duration light heavyweight title
56	Loss	43–10–3	Jack Chase	UD	15	Dec 13, 1943	Civic Auditorium, San Francisco, California, U.S.	For USA California State middleweight title
55	Win	43–9–3	Bobby Berger	TKO	4 (10)	Dec 3, 1943	L Street Arena, Sacramento, California, U.S.	
54	Draw	42–9–3	Jack Chase	PTS	15	Nov 8, 1943	Civic Auditorium, San Francisco, California, U.S.	For USA California State middleweight title
53	Loss	42–9–2	Holman Williams	PTS	10	Sep 3, 1943	Coliseum Arena, New Orleans, Louisiana, U.S.	
52	Win	42–8–2	Bill McDowell	TKO	6 (10)	Aug 19, 1943	Armory, Akron, Ohio, U.S.	
51	Win	41–8–2	Curtis Sheppard	PTS	10	Jul 21, 1943	Lakefront Stadium, Cleveland, Ohio, U.S.	
50	Loss	40–8–2	Jimmy Bivins	KO	13 (15)	Jun 8, 1943	Lakefront Stadium, Cleveland, Ohio, U.S.	For duration light heavyweight title
49	Win	40–7–2	Anton Christoforidis	UD	10	Apr 21, 1943	Arena, Cleveland, Ohio, U.S.	
48	Win	39–7–2	Ezzard Charles	TKO	8 (10)	Mar 31, 1943	Arena, Cleveland, Ohio, U.S.	
47	Win	38–7–2	Harvey Massey	KO	8 (10)	Mar 12, 1943	Coliseum, San Diego, California, U.S.	
46	Win	37–7–2	Costello Cruz	KO	2 (10)	Feb 12, 1943	Legion Stadium, Hollywood, California, U.S.	
45	Win	36–7–2	Harvey Massey	PTS	10	Jan 21, 1943	Civic Auditorium, Stockton, California, U.S.	
44	Win	35–7–2	Charley Burley	SD	10	Dec 11, 1942	Legion Stadium, Hollywood, California, U.S.	
43	Win	34–7–2	Harvey Massey	KO	10 (10)	Oct 15, 1942	Memorial Auditorium, Sacramento, California, U.S.	
42	Loss	33–7–2	Eddie Booker	PTS	10	Sep 28, 1942	Civic Auditorium, San Francisco, California, U.S.	
41	Win	33–6–2	Al Gilbert	KO	5 (10)	Jul 6, 1942	Memorial Auditorium, Sacramento, California, U.S.	
40	Win	32–6–2	Newsboy Millich	KO	3 (10)	Jun 19, 1942	Memorial Auditorium, Sacramento, California, U.S.	
39	Win	31–6–2	Newsboy Millich	TKO	7 (10)	May 1, 1942	Memorial Auditorium, Sacramento, California, U.S.	
38	Win	30–6–2	Johnny Romero	PTS	10	Mar 27, 1942	Coliseum, San Diego, California, U.S.	
37	Win	29–6–2	Ernest Peirce	PTS	10	Feb 27, 1942	Memorial Auditorium, Sacramento, California, U.S.	
36	Win	28–6–2	Billy Pryor	KO	4 (10)	Dec 10, 1941	Memorial Auditorium, Sacramento, California, U.S.	
35	Win	27–6–2	Shorty Hogue	PTS	10	Jun 9, 1941	Memorial Auditorium, Sacramento, California, U.S.	
34	Win	26–6–2	Ralph DeJohn	KO	6 (10)	Apr 28, 1941	Coliseum Bowl, San Francisco, California, U.S.	
33	Win	25–6–2	Jimmy Casino	TKO	8 (10)	Apr 3, 1941	Memorial Auditorium, Sacramento, California, U.S.	
32	Loss	24–6–2	Shorty Hogue	PTS	10	Feb 7, 1941	Memorial Auditorium, Sacramento, California, U.S.	
31	Loss	24–5–2	Teddy Yarosz	PTS	10	Oct 21, 1940	Duquesne Gardens, Pittsburgh, Pennsylvania, U.S.	
30	Win	24–4–2	Tony Cisco	PTS	12	Jun 13, 1940	Hickey Park, Millvale, Pennsylvania, U.S.	
29	Draw	23–4–2	Tony Cisco	PTS	10	May 21, 1940	Forbes Field, Pittsburgh, Pennsylvania, U.S.	
28	Win	23–4–1	George Gano	TKO	2 (10)	May 3, 1940	Butler Street Sports Arena, Pittsburgh, Pennsylvania, U.S.	
27	Win	22–4–1	Tiger Red Lewis	KO	3 (10)	Mar 29, 1940	Mechanics Building, Boston, Massachusetts, U.S.	
26	Win	21–4–1	Lou Brouillard	UD	10	Dec 6, 1939	Auditorium, Oakland, California, U.S.	
25	Win	20–4–1	Teddy Yarosz	PTS	10	Sep 29, 1939	Civic Auditorium, San Francisco, California, U.S.	
24	Win	19–4–1	Harold Dettman	TKO	8 (10)	Jun 23, 1939	Memorial Auditorium, Sacramento, California, U.S.	
23	Win	18–4–1	Jack Hibbard	TKO	3 (10)	May 19, 1939	Olympic Arena, Reno, Nevada, U.S.	
22	Win	17–4–1	Eddie Babe Risko	KO	5 (10)	May 17, 1939	Memorial Auditorium, Sacramento, California, U.S.	
21	Loss	16–4–1	Ceferino Garcia	TKO	5 (10)	Mar 17, 1939	Dreamland Auditorium, San Francisco, California, U.S.	
20	Loss	16–3–1	Ceferino Garcia	PTS	10	Feb 22, 1939	Dreamland Auditorium, San Francisco, California, U.S.	
19	Win	16–2–1	Johnny Erjavec	KO	5 (10)	Dec 14, 1938	Memorial Auditorium, Sacramento, California, U.S.	
18	Win	15–2–1	Ben Valentine	PTS	6	Nov 18, 1938	Madison Square Garden, New York City, New York, U.S.	
17	Win	14–2–1	Ken Overlin	PTS	10	Sep 1, 1938	Civic Auditorium, San Francisco, California, U.S.	
16	Win	13–2–1	Johnny Romero	PTS	10	Jul 21, 1938	Memorial Auditorium, Sacramento, California, U.S.	
15	Win	12–2–1	Charley Coates	PTS	10	Jun 16, 1938	Memorial Auditorium, Sacramento, California, U.S.	
14	Win	11–2–1	Johnny Rossi	KO	3 (10)	Jun 1, 1938	Memorial Auditorium, Sacramento, California, U.S.	
13	Win	10–2–1	Angelo Puglisi	KO	4 (10)	Mar 4, 1938	Memorial Auditorium, Sacramento, California, U.S.	
12	Loss	9–2–1	Johnny Romero	PTS	10	Dec 17, 1937	Dreamland Auditorium, San Francisco, California, U.S.	
11	Draw	9–1–1	Swede Berglund	PTS	10	Nov 12, 1937	Memorial Auditorium, Sacramento, California, U.S.	
10	Win	9–1	Al LaBoa	TKO	8 (10)	Oct 27, 1937	Auditorium, Oakland, California, U.S.	
9	Win	8–1	Joe Smallwood	TKO	7 (10)	Aug 27, 1937	Dreamland Auditorium, San Francisco, California, U.S.	
8	Win	7–1	Pietro Georgi	KO	2 (10)	Jul 30, 1937	Dreamland Auditorium, San Francisco, California, U.S.	
7	Win	6–1	Freddie Graham	KO	2 (6)	Jun 11, 1937	Dreamland Auditorium, San Francisco, California, U.S.	
6	Win	5–1	Pietro Georgi	PTS	6	Jan 29, 1937	L Street Arena, Sacramento, California, U.S.	
5	Win	4–1	Gunner Froines	KO	2 (4)	Dec 18, 1936	Memorial Auditorium, Sacramento, California, U.S.	
4	Win	3–1	Leonard Bennett	PTS	6	Nov 27, 1936	L Street Arena, Sacramento, California, U.S.	
3	Win	2–1	Billy Azevedo	TKO	2 (4)	Nov 6, 1936	L Street Arena, Sacramento, California, U.S.	
2	Win	1–1	Joe Ricciotti	PTS	6	Oct 9, 1936	Dreamland Auditorium, San Francisco, California, U.S.	
1	Loss	0–1	Al LaBoa	PTS	6	Sep 11, 1936	Dreamland Auditorium, San Francisco, California, U.S.	

== See also ==
- Murderers' Row (Boxing)

Achievements
Vacant Title last held by Jimmy Bivins	Duration light heavyweight champion January 18, 1944 – 1945	Title defunct when Gus Lesnevich resumes his career
