= Jack Chase (American boxer) =

American boxer

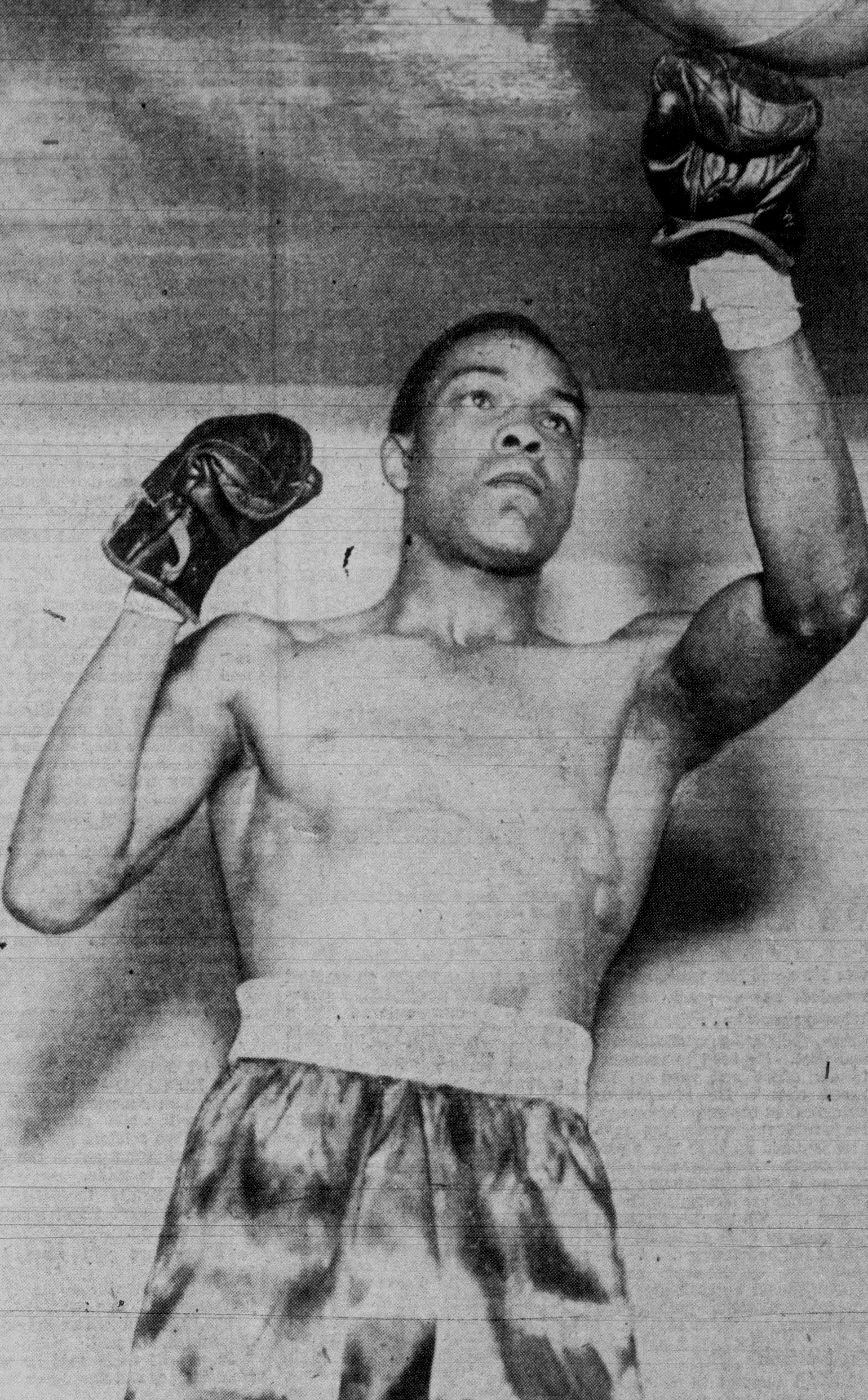
- Chase, circa 1942

Personal information
- Nickname: Young Joe Lewis
- Born: Isaiah James Chase; January 27, 1914 Sherman, Texas, U.S.
- Died: March 23, 1972 (aged 58)
- Weight: Middleweight

Boxing career

Boxing record
- Total fights: 119
- Wins: 81
- Losses: 24
- Draws: 12
- No contests: 2

Jack Chase (1914–1972) was an African-American middleweight, who boxed in the 1930s and 1940s. He was born in Texas and fought mainly on the west coast of the United States. He boxed under the name ‘Young Joe Lewis’ for the first part of his career, before changing to Jack Chase in 1942. His official fight count stands at 122, but it is believed he competed in an additional 40 plus fights prior to 1936, during which time his full record is unknown.

He was ranked second in the world in his division, but never took part in a world title fight. He is included in the set remembered as ‘Murderers’ Row’, a term used by Budd Schulberg to describe those boxers of the era who were so feared that they were avoided by title holders and so were unable to ever secure a title shot.

Jack Chase did win several regional belts in the US, including the Colorado state title, the Rocky Mountain Regional Middleweight and Welterweight Titles in the 1930s and the California State's Middlweight and Light Heavyweight titles in the 1940s. He retired from boxing in 1948.

Chase had several run ins with the law during his life, including serving jail time in Colorado on a few occasions and was arrested for shooting fellow boxer Aaron Wade in California.

Chase was married to actress Lillian Randolph in the 1940s. The two were victims of discrimination when they bought a house in the West Adams district in Los Angeles in 1946. The house had a restrictive covenant that barred them from moving into it. The US Supreme Court declared the practice unconstitutional in 1948.

== Professional boxing record ==
119 fights	81 wins	24 losses
By knockout	35	3
By decision	46	20
By disqualification	0	1
Draws	12	
No contests	2	

No.	Result	Record	Opponent	Type	Round	Date	Location	Notes
119	Draw	81–24–12 (2)	Henry Lee	PTS	6	Aug 31, 1948	Auditorium, Portland, Oregon, U.S.	
118	Win	81–24–11 (2)	Joe Love	KO	2 (6)	Aug 20, 1948	High School Field, Merrill, Oregon, U.S.	
117	Win	80–24–11 (2)	Eddie Keller	RTD	4 (6)	Aug 3, 1948	Auditorium, Portland, Oregon, U.S.	
116	Loss	79–24–11 (2)	Jack Snapp	PTS	10	Jul 3, 1948	Fairbanks, Alaska	
115	Draw	79–23–11 (2)	Bob Ward	PTS	6	Jun 22, 1948	Auditorium, Portland, Oregon, U.S.	
114	Win	79–23–10 (2)	Johnny Janis	KO	2 (6)	Apr 6, 1948	Auditorium, Portland, Oregon, U.S.	
113	Win	78–23–10 (2)	Fred Wallace	TKO	3 (8)	Mar 11, 1948	Armory, Tacoma, Washington, U.S.	
112	NC	77–23–10 (2)	Deacon Logan	NC	6 (10)	Aug 26, 1947	Mammoth Gardens, Denver, Colorado, U.S.	
111	Loss	77–23–10 (1)	Oakland Billy Smith	UD	10	Jun 9, 1947	Coliseum Bowl, San Francisco, California, U.S.	
110	Loss	77–22–10 (1)	Archie Moore	KO	9 (10)	Mar 18, 1947	Olympic Auditorium, Los Angeles, California, U.S.	
109	Loss	77–21–10 (1)	Ray Augustus	PTS	10	Jan 16, 1947	Municipal Auditorium, Topeka, Kansas, U.S.	
108	Draw	77–20–10 (1)	Archie Moore	PTS	10	Nov 6, 1946	Auditorium, Oakland, California, U.S.	
107	Win	77–20–9 (1)	Costello Cruz	PTS	10	Oct 18, 1946	Auditorium, Portland, Oregon, U.S.	
106	Win	76–20–9 (1)	Jimmy Coleman	PTS	10	Sep 13, 1946	Legion Stadium, Hollywood, California, U.S.	
105	Win	75–20–9 (1)	Kenny Watkins	SD	10	Aug 30, 1946	Legion Stadium, Hollywood, California, U.S.	
104	Draw	74–20–9 (1)	Bobby Zander	PTS	10	Apr 12, 1946	National Hall, San Francisco, California, U.S.	
103	Win	74–20–8 (1)	Anthony Jones	TKO	7 (10)	Feb 22, 1946	Legion Stadium, Hollywood, California, U.S.	
102	Win	73–20–8 (1)	Bobby Zander	UD	10	Jan 11, 1946	Legion Stadium, Hollywood, California, U.S.	
101	Win	72–20–8 (1)	Kenny Watkins	UD	10	Nov 23, 1945	Legion Stadium, Hollywood, California, U.S.	
100	Loss	71–20–8 (1)	Kenny Watkins	UD	12	Aug 7, 1945	Olympic Auditorium, Los Angeles, California, U.S.	
99	Loss	71–19–8 (1)	Kenny Watkins	UD	10	Jul 17, 1945	Olympic Auditorium, Los Angeles, California, U.S.	
98	Win	71–18–8 (1)	Titus Hawkins	KO	5 (10)	May 25, 1945	Coliseum, San Diego, California, U.S.	
97	Loss	70–18–8 (1)	Oakland Billy Smith	PTS	10	Jan 3, 1945	Auditorium, Oakland, California, U.S.	
96	Win	70–17–8 (1)	Watson Jones	UD	15	Dec 12, 1944	Olympic Auditorium, Los Angeles, California, U.S.	Won USA California State light heavyweight title
95	Win	69–17–8 (1)	Kid Hermosillo	KO	6 (10)	Dec 1, 1944	Coliseum, San Diego, California, U.S.	
94	Loss	68–17–8 (1)	Herbert Lewis Hardwick	UD	10	Oct 20, 1944	Legion Stadium, Hollywood, California, U.S.	
93	Win	68–16–8 (1)	Oakland Billy Smith	PTS	10	Oct 9, 1944	Auditorium, Oakland, California, U.S.	
92	Loss	67–16–8 (1)	Lloyd Marshall	UD	10	Sep 30, 1944	Gilmore Stadium, Los Angeles, California, U.S.	
91	Loss	67–15–8 (1)	Charley Burley	TKO	12 (15)	Sep 11, 1944	Civic Auditorium, San Francisco, California, U.S.	
90	Win	67–14–8 (1)	Larry Anzalone	KO	1 (10)	Sep 1, 1944	Legion Stadium, Hollywood, California, U.S.	
89	Draw	66–14–8 (1)	Aaron Wade	PTS	10	Aug 9, 1944	Auditorium, Oakland, California, U.S.	
88	Win	66–14–7 (1)	Jimmy Hayden	PTS	10	Jul 31, 1944	Civic Auditorium, San Francisco, California, U.S.	
87	Win	65–14–7 (1)	Paul Lewis	PTS	10	Jul 19, 1944	Auditorium, Oakland, California, U.S.	
86	Win	64–14–7 (1)	Aaron Wade	TKO	10 (10)	Jun 28, 1944	Auditorium, Oakland, California, U.S.	
85	Loss	63–14–7 (1)	Holman Williams	PTS	12	May 24, 1944	Auditorium, Oakland, California, U.S.	
84	Loss	63–13–7 (1)	Holman Williams	PTS	15	Apr 27, 1944	City Auditorium, Denver, Colorado, U.S.	
83	Loss	63–12–7 (1)	Charley Burley	KO	9 (15)	Apr 6, 1944	Legion Stadium, Hollywood, California, U.S.	Lost USA California State middleweight title
82	Win	63–11–7 (1)	Paul Lewis	PTS	10	Mar 29, 1944	Auditorium, Oakland, California, U.S.	
81	Win	62–11–7 (1)	Kid Hermosillo	KO	1 (10)	Mar 7, 1944	Denver, Colorado, U.S.	
80	Loss	61–11–7 (1)	Holman Williams	PTS	12	Feb 21, 1944	Civic Auditorium, San Francisco, California, U.S.	
79	Loss	61–10–7 (1)	Holman Williams	PTS	10	Feb 7, 1944	Civic Auditorium, San Francisco, California, U.S.	
78	Loss	61–9–7 (1)	Costello Cruz	DQ	4 (10)	Jan 28, 1944	Auditorium, Portland, Oregon, U.S.	A left hook to the groin disqualified Chase
77	Win	61–8–7 (1)	Lloyd Marshall	UD	15	Dec 13, 1943	Civic Auditorium, San Francisco, California, U.S.	Retained USA California State middleweight title
76	Loss	60–8–7 (1)	Archie Moore	MD	10	Nov 26, 1943	Legion Stadium, Hollywood, California, U.S.	
75	Draw	60–7–7 (1)	Lloyd Marshall	PTS	15	Nov 8, 1943	Civic Auditorium, San Francisco, California, U.S.	Retained USA California State middleweight title
74	Win	60–7–6 (1)	George Henry	PTS	10	Oct 19, 1943	Stockton, California, U.S.	
73	Win	59–7–6 (1)	Paulie Peters	PTS	10	Oct 11, 1943	Coliseum Bowl, San Francisco, California, U.S.	
72	Win	58–7–6 (1)	Jimmy McDaniels	UD	10	Aug 24, 1943	Civic Auditorium, Seattle, Washington, U.S.	
71	Win	57–7–6 (1)	Archie Moore	UD	15	Aug 2, 1943	Civic Auditorium, San Francisco, California, U.S.	Won USA California State middleweight title
70	Win	56–7–6 (1)	Harry Matthews	UD	10	Jul 23, 1943	Legion Stadium, Hollywood, California, U.S.	
69	Win	55–7–6 (1)	Kid Hermosillo	KO	3 (10)	Jun 29, 1943	Olympic Auditorium, Los Angeles, California, U.S.	
68	Win	54–7–6 (1)	Aaron Wade	PTS	10	Jun 21, 1943	Coliseum Bowl, San Francisco, California, U.S.	
67	Win	53–7–6 (1)	Billy McCoy	TKO	6 (10)	Jun 11, 1943	Coliseum, San Diego, California, U.S.	
66	Loss	52–7–6 (1)	Archie Moore	UD	15	May 8, 1943	Lane Field, San Diego, California, U.S.	Lost USA California State middleweight title
65	Draw	52–6–6 (1)	Jimmy Garrison	PTS	10	Apr 30, 1943	Auditorium, Portland, Oregon, U.S.	
64	Win	52–6–5 (1)	Leon Zorrita	TKO	15 (15)	Apr 19, 1943	Ocean Park Arena, Santa Monica, California, U.S.	Retained USA California State middleweight title
63	Loss	51–6–5 (1)	Charley Burley	UD	10	Feb 19, 1943	Legion Stadium, Hollywood, California, U.S.	
62	Draw	51–5–5 (1)	Costello Cruz	PTS	10	Feb 2, 1943	Auditorium, Portland, Oregon, U.S.	Won vacant Pacific Coast middleweight title
61	Win	51–5–4 (1)	Jackie Byrd	TKO	5 (10)	Jan 26, 1943	Olympic Auditorium, Los Angeles, California, U.S.	
60	Win	50–5–4 (1)	Eddie Booker	PTS	15	Jan 11, 1943	Civic Auditorium, San Francisco, California, U.S.	Won USA California State middleweight title
59	Loss	49–5–4 (1)	Archie Moore	UD	10	Nov 27, 1942	Coliseum, San Diego, California, U.S.	
58	Win	49–4–4 (1)	Amado Rodriguez	PTS	10	Nov 17, 1942	Olympic Auditorium, Los Angeles, California, U.S.	
57	Win	48–4–4 (1)	Costello Cruz	UD	10	Nov 6, 1942	Legion Stadium, Hollywood, California, U.S.	
56	Win	47–4–4 (1)	Sebastian Gonzalez	TKO	1 (10)	Oct 23, 1942	Coliseum, San Diego, California, U.S.	
55	Win	46–4–4 (1)	Tabby Romero	TKO	8 (10)	Oct 16, 1942	Legion Stadium, Hollywood, California, U.S.	
54	Win	45–4–4 (1)	Bobby Birch	PTS	8	Sep 29, 1942	Olympic Auditorium, Los Angeles, California, U.S.	
53	Win	44–4–4 (1)	Bobby Birch	UD	8	Aug 4, 1942	Olympic Auditorium, Los Angeles, California, U.S.	
52	Win	43–4–4 (1)	Big Boy Hogue	UD	8	Jul 21, 1942	Olympic Auditorium, Los Angeles, California, U.S.	
51	Draw	42–4–4 (1)	Jimmy Brooks	PTS	10	Jul 13, 1942	Ocean Park Arena, Santa Monica, California, U.S.	
50	Win	42–4–3 (1)	Costello Cruz	UD	10	Jun 5, 1942	Legion Stadium, Hollywood, California, U.S.	
49	Win	41–4–3 (1)	Jorge Morelia	PTS	6	May 13, 1942	Municipal Auditorium, Long Beach, Florida, U.S.	
48	Win	40–4–3 (1)	Costello Cruz	MD	10	Apr 24, 1942	Legion Stadium, Hollywood, California, U.S.	
47	Win	39–4–3 (1)	Bernie Cardenas	PTS	8	Apr 2, 1942	Pasadena Arena, Pasadena, California, U.S.	
46	Draw	38–4–3 (1)	Costello Cruz	PTS	6	Mar 6, 1942	Legion Stadium, Hollywood, California, U.S.	
45	Win	38–4–2 (1)	Tony Canelli	TKO	5 (6)	Feb 13, 1942	Legion Stadium, Hollywood, California, U.S.	
44	Win	37–4–2 (1)	Roscoe Smith	PTS	6	Jan 26, 1942	Ocean Park Arena, Santa Monica, California, U.S.	
43	Win	36–4–2 (1)	Lalo Rodriguez	PTS	4	Jan 23, 1942	Legion Stadium, Hollywood, California, U.S.	
42	Loss	35–4–2 (1)	Billy Pryor	PTS	12	Nov 6, 1941	Pueblo, Colorado, U.S.	For USA Colorado State middleweight title
41	Win	35–3–2 (1)	Reuben Shank	PTS	8	Oct 12, 1941	Denver, Colorado, U.S.	
40	Win	34–3–2 (1)	Billy Pryor	PTS	10	Oct 6, 1941	Denver, Colorado, U.S.	
39	Win	33–3–2 (1)	Roy Jack Gillespie	TKO	6 (10)	Jun 30, 1941	Mammoth Gardens, Denver, Colorado, U.S.	
38	Win	32–3–2 (1)	Chief Vidal Ballard	KO	10 (?)	Dec 7, 1937	Pueblo, Colorado, U.S.	
37	Win	31–3–2 (1)	Chief Vidal Ballard	PTS	10	Nov 1, 1937	San Luis, Colorado, U.S.	Exact date unknown
36	Win	30–3–2 (1)	Bobby Cortez	KO	3 (?)	Oct 1, 1937	Colorado Springs, Colorado, U.S.	Exact date unknown
35	Win	29–3–2 (1)	Sammy Weiss	KO	1 (?)	Sep 30, 1937	Pueblo, Colorado, U.S.	
34	Win	28–3–2 (1)	Bobby Cortez	KO	3 (10)	Sep 6, 1937	Antonito, Colorado, U.S.	
33	Win	27–3–2 (1)	Teddy Williams	KO	1 (8)	Aug 17, 1937	Walsenburg, Colorado, U.S.	
32	Win	26–3–2 (1)	Mo Hammons	KO	4 (10)	Jul 1, 1937	San Luis, Colorado, U.S.	Exact date unknown
31	Win	25–3–2 (1)	Joe Jaramillo	PTS	10	Jun 20, 1937	Alamosa, Colorado, U.S.	Won USA Colorado State welterweight title; Exact date unknown
30	NC	24–3–2 (1)	Phil McQuillan	NC	7 (?)	Jun 1, 1937	Walsenburg, Colorado, U.S.	McQuillan hit the referee who had been warning him for various infractions; Exact date unknown
29	Loss	24–3–2	George Black	PTS	6	May 21, 1937	Olympia Stadium, Detroit, Michigan, U.S.	
28	Win	24–2–2	Ralph Chong	KO	5 (10)	May 4, 1937	Arena Gardens, Detroit, Michigan, U.S.	
27	Win	23–2–2	Gale Harrington	PTS	6	Mar 30, 1937	Olympic Auditorium, Los Angeles, California, U.S.	
26	Loss	22–2–2	Joe Jaramillo	PTS	10	Feb 2, 1937	Pueblo, Colorado, U.S.	Lost USA Colorado State welterweight title
25	Win	22–1–2	Eddie Cerda	KO	5 (10)	Jan 25, 1937	Armory, Las Vegas, Nevada, U.S.	
24	Loss	21–1–2	Ernest Peirce	PTS	10	Dec 28, 1936	City Auditorium, Denver, Colorado, U.S.	
23	Win	21–0–2	Eddie Murdock	KO	7 (10)	Dec 23, 1936	Legion Hall, Gallup, New Mexico, U.S.	
22	Win	20–0–2	George Black	PTS	10	Dec 18, 1936	City Auditorium, Denver, Colorado, U.S.	
21	Win	19–0–2	Sonny Boy Ackers	TKO	4 (10)	Dec 9, 1936	City Auditorium, Denver, Colorado, U.S.	
20	Win	18–0–2	Billy Azevedo	TKO	7 (10)	Nov 27, 1936	Sunset Gardens, Trinidad, Colorado, U.S.	
19	Win	17–0–2	Buster Connor	KO	5 (10)	Nov 19, 1936	Pueblo, Colorado, U.S.	
18	Win	16–0–2	Dixie Taylor	KO	7 (10)	Nov 11, 1936	Sidney, Nebraska, U.S.	
17	Win	15–0–2	Battling Chico	KO	1 (10)	Oct 23, 1936	St. Mary's Auditorium, Walsenburg, Colorado, U.S.	
16	Win	14–0–2	Dick Prue	PTS	10	Sep 24, 1936	Alamosa, Colorado, U.S.	Retained Rocky Mountain Regional welterweight title
15	Win	13–0–2	Jackie Burke	PTS	10	Sep 15, 1936	St. Mary's Auditorium, Walsenburg, Colorado, U.S.	Won Inter-mountain middleweight and welterweight titles
14	Win	12–0–2	Mike Montoya	PTS	10	Sep 7, 1936	Antonito, Colorado, U.S.	
13	Win	11–0–2	Joe Jaramillo	PTS	10	Aug 20, 1936	Pueblo, Colorado, U.S.	Retained USA Colorado welterweight title; Won vacant USA Colorado middleweight title
12	Win	10–0–2	Joe Skube	PTS	10	Aug 6, 1936	Colorado Springs, Colorado, U.S.	
11	Win	9–0–2	Johnny Johnson	PTS	10	Jul 24, 1936	St. Mary's Auditorium, Walsenburg, Colorado, U.S.	
10	Win	8–0–2	Dick Prue	PTS	10	Jul 3, 1936	Cripple Creek, Colorado, U.S.	
9	Draw	7–0–2	Joe Garcia	PTS	10	Jul 1, 1936	Pueblo, Colorado, U.S.	Exact date in 1936 unknown
8	Win	7–0–1	Mike Montoya	KO	6 (10)	Jun 26, 1936	St. Mary's Auditorium, Walsenburg, Colorado, U.S.	Won vacant USA Colorado welterweight title
7	Win	6–0–1	June Hack	KO	4 (6)	Jun 11, 1936	Cripple Creek, Colorado, U.S.	
6	Win	5–0–1	Lee Medina	PTS	10	May 26, 1936	St. Mary's Auditorium, Walsenburg, Colorado, U.S.	
5	Win	4–0–1	Dick Prue	PTS	10	Apr 1, 1936	Victor, Colorado, U.S.	
4	Win	3–0–1	Nick Broglio	PTS	10	Mar 18, 1936	American Legion Post, Pueblo, Colorado, U.S.	
3	Draw	2–0–1	Billy Pryor	PTS	6	Feb 25, 1936	American Legion Post, Pueblo, Colorado, U.S.	
2	Win	2–0	Buster Johnson	KO	3 (6)	Feb 3, 1936	V.F.W. Post, Raton, New Mexico, U.S.	
1	Win	1–0	Billy Pryor	PTS	4	Jan 30, 1936	St. Mary's Auditorium, Walsenburg, Colorado, U.S.	

== See also ==
- Murderers' Row (Boxing)
