= Aaron Wade =

American boxer

Personal information
- Nickname: Little Tiger
- Nationality: American
- Born: March 17, 1916 Trenton, Tennessee
- Died: February 15, 1985 (aged 68) San Francisco, California
- Height: 5 ft 5 1/2 in (1.66 m)
- Weight: Middleweight

Boxing career
- Stance: Orthodox

Boxing record
- Total fights: 86
- Wins: 64
- Win by KO: 32
- Losses: 16
- Draws: 6

Aaron "Little Tiger" Wade (March 17, 1916 – February 15, 1985) was an American Middleweight boxer who fought from 1935 to 1950. Wade was a member of the famed Black Murderers' Row.

== Early life ==
Born in Trenton Tennessee, Wade became the first African American golden gloves champion in Peoria, Illinois and reportedly had 600 or more amateur fights. Aaron's older brother Bruce "Big Tiger" Wade was also a professional boxer, albeit a less successful one than his younger brother. Aaron stood a hair above 5 feet 5 inches and began his career at 140 lbs as a welterweight before moving up and fighting at middleweight and light heavyweight.

== Career ==
Known for his power, Wade had a knockout ratio of 50% over a span of 64 victories. His fights with other members of the black murderers' row are 3 losses to Charley Burley, 1 win over Herbert Lewis "Cocoa Kid" Hardwick, 2 losses and 1 draw to Jack Chase, and a win over Bert Lytell. Other notable fights of Wade's career include a win over Archie Moore, a win against Sam Baroudi, 3 wins against Oakland Billy Smith, a loss to Ceferino Garcia, and a loss in his final career fight after a 2-year layoff against the great Sugar Ray Robinson. Like all the black murderer's row fighters, Wade never got a shot at the world title. Aaron Wade finished his career with a record of 64(32 KOs)-16-6.

Wade was a sparring partner of Sugar Ray Robinson's in 1948. According to a Boston Post article, Wade got into a fight with Sugar Ray over Wade's payment. Wade had knocked down Sugar Ray outside a gym and left him with separation of his ribs and swelling described as "the size of a pullet egg" around his heart. Robinson had to cancel his scheduled fight and was out for the next two months.

Author Springs Toledo uncovered evidence that Wade took a dive in the bout against Sugar Ray Robinson. According to Wade's son, Robinson was unaware of the fix with the promoters being the culprits, paying Wade a few hundred dollars to go down in three rounds and lose the fight. According to the Savannah Evening Press Wade "began hitting the canvas for apparently no reason at all."

== Later years ==
After his career ended, Wade descended into alcoholism but later overcame it and devoted his life to helping the less fortunate in the Fillmore section of San Francisco as a Christian minister. Wade died of a heart attack on February 15, 1985. He was 68 years old.

== Professional boxing record ==
86 fights	64 wins	16 losses
By knockout	32	5
By decision	32	11
Draws	6	

No.	Result	Record	Opponent	Type	Round	Date	Location
86	Loss	64–16–6	Sugar Ray Robinson	KO	3 (10)	Feb 22, 1950	Municipal Auditorium, Savannah, Georgia, U.S.
85	Loss	64–15–6	Wylie Burns	UD	10	Dec 22, 1947	Valley Arena, Holyoke, Massachusetts, U.S.
84	Loss	64–14–6	Ted Lowry	UD	10	Oct 27, 1947	Valley Arena, Holyoke, Massachusetts, U.S.
83	Win	64–13–6	Sam Baroudi	SD	10	Oct 13, 1947	Valley Arena, Holyoke, Massachusetts, U.S.
82	Loss	63–13–6	Holman Williams	KO	4 (10)	Feb 4, 1946	St. Nicholas Arena, Manhattan, New York City, New York, U.S.
81	Win	63–12–6	Joe Hyman	TKO	2 (10)	Oct 15, 1945	St. Nicholas Arena, Manhattan, New York City, New York, U.S.
80	Win	62–12–6	Bert Lytell	SD	10	Oct 1, 1945	Coliseum, Baltimore, Maryland, U.S.
79	Loss	61–12–6	Charley Burley	UD	10	Aug 20, 1945	Forbes Field, Pittsburgh, Pennsylvania, U.S.
78	Win	61–11–6	Mario Raul Ochoa	TKO	2 (6)	Aug 10, 1945	Madison Square Garden, Manhattan, New York City, New York, U.S.
77	Loss	60–11–6	Joe Carter	PTS	10	Dec 11, 1944	Civic Auditorium, San Francisco, California, U.S.
76	Win	60–10–6	Herbert Lewis Hardwick	PTS	10	Nov 13, 1944	Civic Auditorium, San Francisco, California, U.S.
75	Loss	59–10–6	Holman Williams	PTS	10	Oct 11, 1944	Auditorium, Oakland, California, U.S.
74	Win	59–9–6	Jimmy Hayden	KO	1 (10)	Sep 29, 1944	National Hall, San Francisco, California, U.S.
73	Draw	58–9–6	Jack Chase	PTS	10	Aug 9, 1944	Auditorium, Oakland, California, U.S.
72	Loss	58–9–5	Jack Chase	TKO	10 (10)	Jun 28, 1944	Auditorium, Oakland, California, U.S.
71	Loss	58–8–5	Charley Burley	PTS	10	Mar 24, 1944	Coliseum, San Diego, California, U.S.
70	Win	58–7–5	Alonzo Williams	TKO	2 (6)	Feb 21, 1944	Civic Auditorium, San Francisco, California, U.S.
69	Win	57–7–5	Eddie Guerra	TKO	1 (10)	Nov 15, 1943	Coliseum Bowl, San Francisco, California, U.S.
68	Win	56–7–5	Harvey Massey	TKO	7 (10)	Oct 25, 1943	Coliseum Bowl, San Francisco, California, U.S.
67	Win	55–7–5	Harvey Massey	TKO	4 (10)	Oct 4, 1943	Coliseum Bowl, San Francisco, California, U.S.
66	Win	54–7–5	Archie Moore	PTS	10	Aug 16, 1943	Coliseum Bowl, San Francisco, California, U.S.
65	Win	53–7–5	RJ Lewis	TKO	4 (10)	Aug 2, 1943	Civic Auditorium, San Francisco, California, U.S.
64	Win	52–7–5	RJ Lewis	TKO	1 (10)	Jul 19, 1943	Coliseum Bowl, San Francisco, California, U.S.
63	Loss	51–7–5	Jack Chase	PTS	10	Jun 21, 1943	Coliseum Bowl, San Francisco, California, U.S.
62	Win	51–6–5	Al Couture	TKO	2 (8)	Jun 7, 1943	Coliseum Bowl, San Francisco, California, U.S.
61	Loss	50–6–5	Charley Burley	PTS	10	Mar 3, 1943	Auditorium, Oakland, California, U.S.
60	Win	50–5–5	Watson Jones	PTS	10	Dec 18, 1942	Coliseum, San Diego, California, U.S.
59	Win	49–5–5	Rand Jackson	KO	3 (8)	Dec 3, 1942	National Hall, San Francisco, California, U.S.
58	Win	48–5–5	Oakland Billy Smith	PTS	10	Nov 10, 1942	Auditorium, Oakland, California, U.S.
57	Win	47–5–5	Buddy Green	TKO	4 (8)	Oct 16, 1942	National Hall, San Francisco, California, U.S.
56	Win	46–5–5	Bobby Birch	PTS	8	Sep 18, 1942	National Hall, San Francisco, California, U.S.
55	Win	45–5–5	Tabby Romero	PTS	8	Sep 4, 1942	National Hall, San Francisco, California, U.S.
54	Win	44–5–5	Oakland Billy Smith	KO	4 (8)	Aug 28, 1942	National Hall, San Francisco, California, U.S.
53	Win	43–5–5	Tabby Romero	PTS	6	Aug 26, 1942	Auditorium, Oakland, California, U.S.
52	Win	42–5–5	Oakland Billy Smith	PTS	8	Aug 21, 1942	National Hall, San Francisco, California, U.S.
51	Win	41–5–5	Rudy Campa	KO	1 (8)	Aug 7, 1942	National Hall, San Francisco, California, U.S.
50	Loss	40–5–5	Johnny Jackson	PTS	10	Aug 11, 1941	Civic Auditorium, San Francisco, California, U.S.
49	Win	40–4–5	Johnny Jackson	PTS	10	Jul 17, 1941	Coliseum Bowl, San Francisco, California, U.S.
48	Win	39–4–5	Urban Hernandez	TKO	6 (10)	Jun 16, 1941	Coliseum Bowl, San Francisco, California, U.S.
47	Loss	38–4–5	Johnny Jackson	KO	5 (10)	Apr 25, 1941	Legion Stadium, Hollywood, California, U.S.
46	Win	38–3–5	Big Boy Hogue	RTD	8 (10)	Dec 20, 1940	Coliseum Bowl, San Francisco, California, U.S.
45	Win	37–3–5	Bobby Pacho	TKO	6 (10)	Sep 30, 1940	Coliseum Bowl, San Francisco, California, U.S.
44	Win	36–3–5	Billy Bengal	KO	1 (10)	Jun 28, 1940	National Hall, San Francisco, California, U.S.
43	Win	35–3–5	Lloyd Delucchi	PTS	10	Jun 7, 1940	National Hall, San Francisco, California, U.S.
42	Win	34–3–5	Billy Azevedo	PTS	4	May 13, 1940	Coliseum Bowl, San Francisco, California, U.S.
41	Loss	33–3–5	Billy Azevedo	PTS	6	Mar 29, 1940	L Street Arena, Sacramento, California, U.S.
40	Loss	33–2–5	Jackie Cooper	PTS	5	Nov 17, 1939	White City Arena, Chicago, Illinois, U.S.
39	Win	33–1–5	Chuck Vickers	KO	3 (?)	Aug 31, 1939	Peoria, Illinois, U.S.
38	Win	32–1–5	Henry Woods	PTS	10	Feb 10, 1939	Dreamland Auditorium, San Francisco, California, U.S.
37	Win	31–1–5	Billy Pascal	KO	10 (10)	Feb 1, 1939	National Hall, San Francisco, California, U.S.
36	Win	30–1–5	Herman Graves	PTS	6	Nov 8, 1938	San Jose, California, U.S.
35	Win	29–1–5	Jack Rainwater	TKO	2 (6)	Oct 10, 1938	National Hall, San Francisco, California, U.S.
34	Win	28–1–5	Ace of Spades	TKO	3 (6)	Oct 3, 1938	National Hall, San Francisco, California, U.S.
33	Win	27–1–5	Frankie Santos	KO	4 (6)	Aug 22, 1938	National Hall, San Francisco, California, U.S.
32	Draw	26–1–5	Frankie Santos	PTS	4	Aug 12, 1938	Dreamland Auditorium, San Francisco, California, U.S.
31	Win	26–1–4	Jimmy McCready	PTS	6	Jun 1, 1938	National Hall, San Francisco, California, U.S.
30	Win	25–1–4	Jack Rainwater	PTS	10	Apr 26, 1938	Memorial Auditorium, Sacramento, California, U.S.
29	Win	24–1–4	Jimmy Berres	PTS	6	Mar 16, 1938	Civic Auditorium, San Francisco, California, U.S.
28	Win	23–1–4	Johnny Bassanelli	PTS	10	Feb 4, 1938	Memorial Auditorium, Sacramento, California, U.S.
27	Win	22–1–4	Jimmy Wakefield	TKO	2 (6)	Jan 19, 1938	Civic Auditorium, San Francisco, California, U.S.
26	Win	21–1–4	Billy Azevedo	PTS	6	Nov 10, 1937	Auditorium, Oakland, California, U.S.
25	Win	20–1–4	Young Lew Massey	TKO	3 (6)	Oct 13, 1937	Auditorium, Oakland, California, U.S.
24	Win	19–1–4	George Romero	TKO	2 (6)	Sep 24, 1937	Dreamland Auditorium, San Francisco, California, U.S.
23	Draw	18–1–4	Mickey Duris	PTS	6	Sep 17, 1937	Dreamland Auditorium, San Francisco, California, U.S.
22	Draw	18–1–3	Clarence Enos	PTS	4	Aug 25, 1937	Auditorium, Oakland, California, U.S.
21	Win	18–1–2	Mario Duccini	PTS	6	May 28, 1937	L Street Arena, Sacramento, California, U.S.
20	Win	17–1–2	Lee Medina	PTS	6	Apr 26, 1937	Civic Auditorium, San Francisco, California, U.S.
19	Win	16–1–2	Teddy Movan	KO	1 (6)	Apr 16, 1937	Dreamland Auditorium, San Francisco, California, U.S.
18	Loss	15–1–2	Ceferino Garcia	TKO	1 (10)	Mar 23, 1937	Civic Auditorium, San Jose, California, U.S.
17	Win	15–0–2	Johnny Fasano	TKO	3 (6)	Nov 20, 1936	L Street Arena, Sacramento, California, U.S.
16	Draw	14–0–2	Billy Azevedo	PTS	6	Nov 4, 1936	Civic Auditorium, San Francisco, California, U.S.
15	Win	14–0–1	Billy Azevedo	PTS	6	Oct 21, 1936	Dreamland Auditorium, San Francisco, California, U.S.
14	Win	13–0–1	Mike Barto	PTS	6	Sep 16, 1936	Auditorium, Oakland, California, U.S.
13	Win	12–0–1	Frankie Santos	PTS	6	Aug 12, 1936	Civic Auditorium, San Francisco, California, U.S.
12	Draw	11–0–1	Jimmy McLeod	PTS	6	Jul 31, 1936	Dreamland Auditorium, San Francisco, California, U.S.
11	Win	11–0	Jimmy McLeod	PTS	4	Jul 22, 1936	Civic Auditorium, San Francisco, California, U.S.
10	Win	10–0	Lloyd Smith	TKO	3 (6)	Jun 10, 1936	Sports Palace, San Francisco, California, U.S.
9	Win	9–0	Johnny Bassanelli	TKO	3 (6)	May 21, 1936	L Street Arena, Sacramento, California, U.S.
8	Win	8–0	Frankie Nocella	TKO	5 (6)	May 15, 1936	Civic Auditorium, San Francisco, California, U.S.
7	Win	7–0	Bert Sommers	PTS	4	Apr 17, 1936	L Street Arena, Sacramento, California, U.S.
6	Win	6–0	Walter Adams	PTS	4	Mar 27, 1936	L Street Arena, Sacramento, California, U.S.
5	Win	5–0	Bobby White	KO	2 (4)	Mar 13, 1936	L Street Arena, Sacramento, California, U.S.
4	Win	4–0	Jimmy Duffy	PTS	4	Nov 22, 1935	Chestnut St. Arena, Reno, Nevada, U.S.
3	Win	3–0	Carl Martin	UD	8	Oct 14, 1935	Quincy, Illinois, U.S.
2	Win	2–0	Murray Allen	PTS	6	Sep 27, 1935	Peoria, Illinois, U.S.
1	Win	1–0	Murray Allen	PTS	8	Aug 15, 1935	Quincy, Illinois, U.S.
