= Murderers' Row (boxing) =

American boxing group

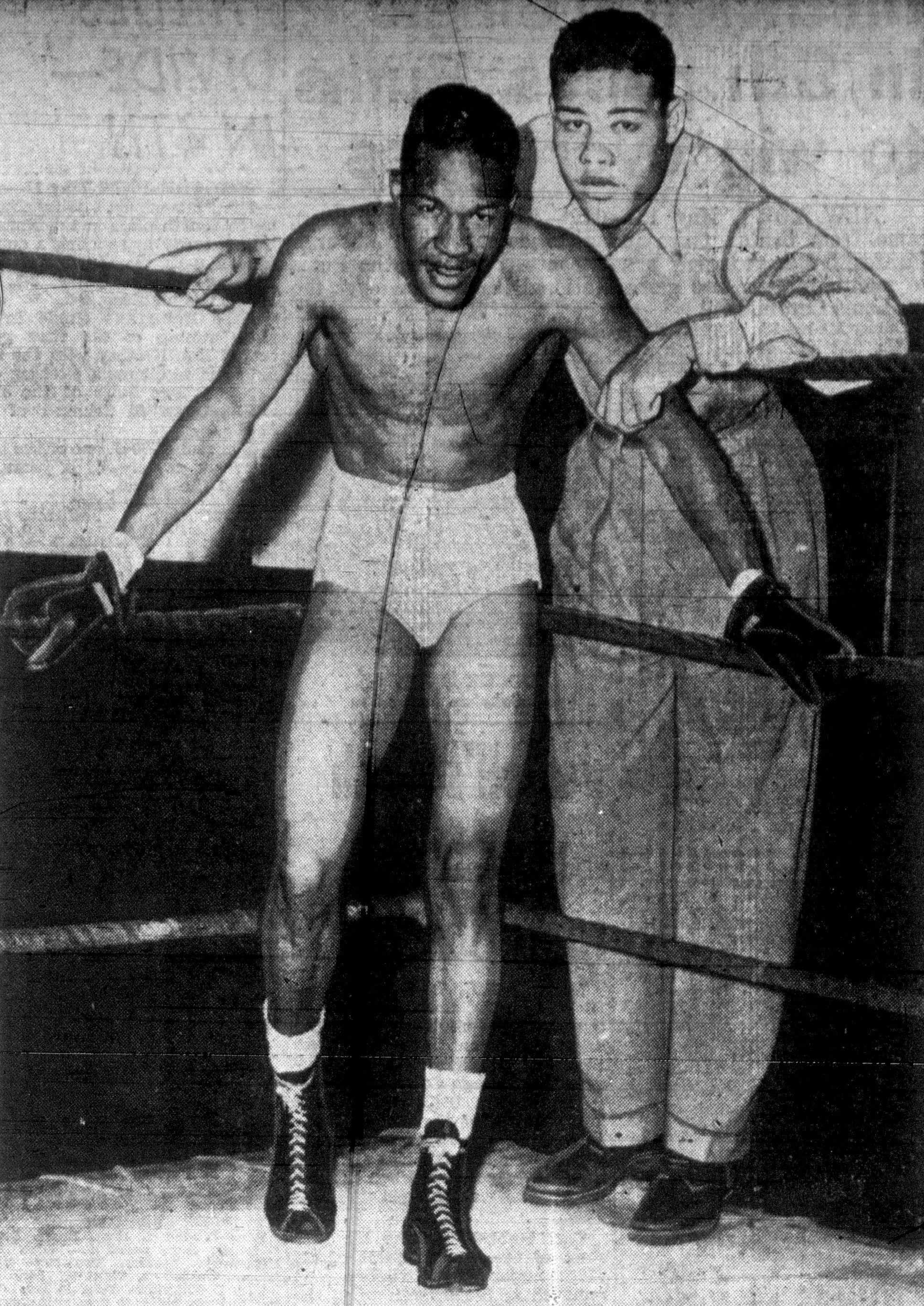
Notable fighters of the Murderer's Row (clockwise from the top left): Charley Burley, Cocoa Kid, and Holman Williams. All fought each other on multiple occasions.

Murderers' Row refers to a group of elite boxing contenders in the United States competing in the 1940s, primarily of a Black American background. Renowned for their toughness and great boxing ability, they were feared throughout the boxing world and were top ranked, yet never got a chance to fight for a world title. According to boxing pundit Jim Murray, they were “the most exclusive men’s club the ring has ever known. They were so good and so feared that they had to have their own tournament”.

Fighters recognized under the Murderers’ Row banner include Charley Burley, Lloyd Marshall, Holman Williams, Herbert "Cocoa Kid" Lewis Hardwick, Jack Chase, Eddie Booker, Aaron Wade, and Bert Lytell. Avoided by many of the famous names of the day, the eight Murderers’ Row fighters faced each other a total of 62 times, the fights often classics and grueling contests.

The expression "murderers' row" had been used previously to describe the batting line-up of the New York Yankees baseball team in the late 1920s. The phrase as used in boxing was originally coined by writer Budd Schulberg.

== The Murderers’ Row fighters ==
- Schulberg's Original List
  Eddie Booker: 1935–1944
  Charley Burley: 1936–1950
  Jack Chase: 1938–1948
  Bert Lytell: 1944–1951
  Lloyd Marshall: 1936–1951

== Overview ==
The Murderers’ Row mostly fought at middleweight although many also fought at welterweight and light heavyweight at various points in their respective careers.

While all fighters in Murderers’ Row were highly regarded and top ranked contenders, significant praise goes to Charley Burley, who is regarded by many in the boxing community as the most talented fighter never to compete for a world title. Fight writer Tom Archdeacon, wrote of Burley, “[he was] kept from title shots and ducked by many of the top fighters, he was reduced to fighting other tough - and avoided - black middleweights”. For nearly a decade Burely defeated everyone put in front of him. In the mid-1940s, world champions in Fritzie Zivic, Billy Soose and the great Archie Moore counted as Burley’s conquests. He was ranked in the top 10 in the Welterweight and Middleweight divisions for most of the 1940s, without receiving a title shot. (Burley did hold the World Colored Welterweight and World Colored Middleweight Championships.) Near the end of his career Burley took to fighting Heavyweights in a bid to find meaningful contests, including J.D. Turner and future Heavyweight champ Ezzard Charles. Eventually, Burley would retire after winning 83 bouts, without ever being able to meet in the ring the champions of the time, such as Rocky Graziano, Sugar Ray Robinson and Jake LaMotta. Burley was inducted into the International Boxing Hall of Fame in 1992.

Another member, Eddie Booker campaigned primarily at Light Heavyweight in the 1940s. Based in California, Booker blazed a path through the division, he would be victorious in 67 bouts, only losing on 5 occasions. A physically muscular and durable fighter, he was a blend of boxing skill and formidable punching power. In his autobiography, Light Heavyweight world champion, Archie Moore, stated that Booker was one of only two boxers (the other was Burley in a 1944 bout) who beat him in his prime and rated them as the best fighters he ever faced. Booker would compete in 80 bouts without ever being stopped.

Fellow International Hall of Famer, Holman Williams fought across three weight divisions. Graduating from the same Detroit gym as Joe Louis, Williams was known for his defensive skills and technique. Boxing coach Eddie Futch stated he would rather watch Williams spar than most fighters box in the ring. The local New Orleans paper and Ring Magazine both reported on the large crowds that would attend Williams’ fights and the standing ovations received for his performances. Williams would eventually compete in over 180 bouts, without ever getting a shot at the title. Some have suggested him over Burley as the greatest member of the Murderer's Row. (Their own series ended at 3-3 apiece, and one no-contest). Conversely, he has been noted for his lack of success in a lengthy series with fellow Row member Herbert "Cocoa Kid" Lewis Hardwick.

Fellow member Jack Chase, also known as the ‘Young Joe Louis’, was frequently in trouble with the law (he was imprisoned several times and at one point was arrested for shooting fellow Murderer’s Row fighter Aaron Wade, although both men later claimed the incident was an accident). The San Francisco Chronicle sports correspondent of the time, Eddie Muller, wrote that Chase moved around the ring with speed and skill “every move a picture.” It was reported that he had at least 48 bouts in the 1930s which are not included in the official record, but this has been disproven.

Many of these fighters would only receive the official recognition they deserved years after their careers. Six members of Murderers’ Row have since become International or World Hall of Famers.
