= Henry Hall (American boxer) =

American boxer, born 1922

Personal information
- Born: William Hall; August 29, 1922 Napoleonville, Louisiana, U.S.
- Died: May 25, 2016 (aged 93)
- Height: 5 ft 11 in (180 cm)
- Weight: Light heavyweight

Boxing career
- Stance: Orthodox

Boxing record
- Total fights: 91
- Wins: 57
- Win by KO: 18
- Losses: 26
- Draws: 7
- No contests: 1

William "Henry" Hall (August 29, 1922 – May 25, 2016) was an American professional boxer who competed from 1942 to 1960. His birth name was William Hall.

== Early life ==
Born in Napoleonville, Louisiana, Hall was the second of five children of Louis and Ida Hall. After his mother's death, the family moved to New Orleans, where he began boxing at the Rampart Street gym.

== Professional career ==
Hall turned professional in 1942. He adopted "Henry" Hall as his ring name at the suggestion of his manager, who said that it sounded more sporty.

On October 15, 1948, he defeated Archie Moore, the future world light-heavyweight champion, in New Orleans. Hall was ranked as the ninth-best light heavyweight in the world that year in The Ring's annual ratings. He fought in exhibition bouts against Joe Louis and Ezzard Charles in 1950 and 1951, respectively. He also held Heinz Neuhaus to a ten-round draw in Germany in 1955. He retired in 1960.

== Later life ==
Hall moved to Milwaukee in the 1950s. After retirement, he worked as a cement mason and a school bus driver. He suffered from dementia in his later years and died on May 25, 2016, at age 93.
