= Shorty =

Shorty may refer to:

== People ==
- Shorty (nickname)
- Shorty G and Shorty Gable, ring names of Chad Gable (born 1986), American professional wrestler
- Shorty (actor) (born 1990), American actor, singer and rapper

== Music ==
=== Artists ===
- Ras Shorty I, Trinidadian artist and founder of soca music
- Shorty (band), an American rock band formed in 1991
- Shorty (American rapper), Member of Platinum recording group Da Lench Mob.
- Shorty (Croatian rapper) (born 1980)
- Shorty (MC), member of Boy Better Know
- Shorty da Prince (born 1989), American radio DJ, rapper, and television personality
- Buckshot (rapper) (born 1974), member of the hip hop trio Black Moon
- Magnolia Shorty (1982–2010), American rapper
- Guitar Shorty (1934-2022, American blues guitarist David William Kearney
- Trombone Shorty (born 1986), stage name of American jazz musician Troy Andrews

=== Songs ===
- "Shorty" (song), by The Get Up Kids
- "Shorty (You Keep Playin' with My Mind)", 1998 debut single from R&B group Imajin
- "Shorty" (Casa de Leones song)
- "Shorty" (Future and Juice Wrld song)
- "Shorty" (Asleep at the Wheel song)

== Film and television ==
- Shorty (film), a 2002 independent comedy film
- Shorty, a nickname for the New Zealand soap opera Shortland Street

== Characters ==
- Shorty Meeks, a character in the Scary Movie franchise
- Shorty, a character in The Land Before Time animated film series
- Shorty, a character from Eddie Lawrence's 1960s cartoon film series
- Shorty, title character of Shorty McShorts' Shorts, a Disney Channel animated TV series
- Shorty Kellums, a recurring character on the TV series The Beverly Hillbillies; see List of The Beverly Hillbillies episodes
- Shorty, any of a race of fictional cucumber-sized people in the Dunno children's books by Nikolay Nosov

== Other uses ==
- Shorty (crater), on the Moon
- Nokia Shorty, a common name for the Nokia 2115i mobile phone
- Shorty, a type of wetsuit
- Shorty Awards, awards for excellence in social media
- Shorty's Lunch, a Washington, Pennsylvania, hot dog lunch counter
- Shorty (slang), American slang
- A sawed-off shotgun

== See also ==
- Shortie (babydoll), a short, sleeveless, loose-fitting nightgown or negligee, intended as nightwear for women
- Shawty (disambiguation)
