= Shorty (nickname) =

Shorty is a nickname which may refer to:

- Joseph Armone (1917–1992), New York City gangster
- Shorty Baker (1914–1966), American jazz trumpeter
- Shorty Barr (1897–1957), American National Football League player and player-coach
- Shorty Cantlon (1904–1947), American race car driver
- Gordon Carpenter (1919–1988), American basketball player
- Shorty Castro (1928–2018), Puerto Rican comedian, actor, and musician
- George V. Chalmers (1907–1984), American college football, basketball and baseball player
- Allen Daniels (born 1959), former Australian rules footballer
- Shorty Dee (1889–1971), Canadian baseball shortstop
- Paul Des Jardien (1893–1956), American football, baseball and basketball player, member of the College Football Hall of Fame
- Shorty Ellsworth (1881–1963), American football player and coach
- Shorty Elness (1906–1965), American football player
- Shorty Fuller (1867–1904), American Major League Baseball player
- Shorty Gallagher (1872–1924), baseball player
- Shorty Green (1896–1960), Canadian National Hockey League player
- Shorty Hamilton (1879–1925), American silent film actor and comedian
- Shorty Hogue, middleweight boxer in the 1940s
- George Horne (ice hockey) (1904–1929), Canadian National Hockey League player
- Shorty Howe, a baseball player
- Shorty Hughes (1922–2003), American football coach
- Shorty Jenkins (1935–2013), ice technician in the sport of curling
- Vernon Keogh (1911–1941), American World War II fighter pilot
- Shorty Long (1940–1969), American soul singer, songwriter, musician and record producer
- Frank Longman (1882–1928), American college football player and coach
- Shorty Mack (born 1981), producer, rapper, and actor
- Shorty McMillan (1890–1964), American football quarterback for the University of Michigan
- Shorty McWilliams (1926–1997), American football player
- Shorty Medlocke (1912–1982), American delta blues and hard rock musician and composer
- Shorty Miller (1890–1966), American football quarterback for Penn State, member of the College Hall of Fame
- Frank Moniz (1911–2004), American soccer player
- Shorty Price (1921–1980), American attorney and perennial political candidate
- Clyde Propst (1898–1959), American college football coach
- Shorty Ransom (1898–1959), American football coach and college athletics administrator
- Hugh "Shorty" Ray (1884–1956), longtime Supervisor of Officials for the National Football League, member of the Pro Football Hall of Fame
- George Redding (1900–1974), Canadian National Hockey League player
- Shorty Rogers (1924–1994), American musician and arranger, one of the principal creators of West Coast jazz
- Shorty Rollins (1929–1998), American race car driver
- Shorty Rossi (born 1969), American actor and star of the reality TV series Pit Boss
- Shorty Sherock (1915–1980), American swing jazz trumpeter
- Rob Short (born 1972), field hockey player for Canada
- Jimmy Slagle (1873–1956), American Major League Baseball player
- Shorty Templeman (1919–1962), American racecar driver
- Shorty Lungkata Tjungurayyi (1920–1987), artist
- George Williams (basketball) (1899–1961), American basketball player in the 1920s
- Irvin Yeaworth (1926–2004), German-born American film director, producer, screenwriter and theme park builder

== See also ==
- Joaquín Guzmán Loera (born 1954 or 1957), Mexican former drug lord known as "El Chapo Guzmán" ('The Shorty Guzmán')
- Diego Schwartzman (born 1992), Argentine tennis player nicknamed "El Peque" (an abbreviation of the word pequeño, meaning 'Shorty' in Spanish)
- Shorty (disambiguation)
- Boston Shorty, nickname of pool player Morton Goldberg
