= Pedro Montañez =

Puerto Rican boxer

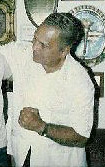
- Montañez in 1985

Personal information
- Nickname: El Torito De Cayey (The little Bull from Cayey)
- Born: April 24, 1914 Cayey, Puerto Rico
- Died: June 26, 1996 (aged 82)
- Height: 1.65 m (5 ft 5 in)

Boxing career
- Reach: 68 in (170 cm)
- Stance: Orthodox

Boxing record
- Total fights: 103
- Wins: 91
- Win by KO: 51
- Losses: 8
- Draws: 4

Pedro Montañez (April 24, 1914 – June 26, 1996) was a boxer from Cayey, Puerto Rico. Also known as El Torito De Cayey (The Little Bull of Cayey), he has been considered by many to be one of the best boxers in history never to win a world title. In his career, he was 91–8–4 (51KO).

== Career ==
Montañez was recognized by Ring Magazine as one of history's most prolific knockout winners with 56 knockout wins, and one of the Latinos with the most knockout wins—while only being knocked out twice himself. He also ranks as number 14 in boxing history, also recognized by Ring Magazine, among boxers with most wins in a row, totalling 88 wins in a row.

Montanez began boxing in 1931, and captured the Puerto Rican lightweight title in 1933. A European tour followed, and he registered victories in Spain, France, England, and Italy. He was next showcased in New York, and scored wins over Aldo Spoldi and Frankie Klick among others. That set up a non-title bout with lightweight king Lou Ambers, which Montanez won in a 10-round decision—he was thereafter dubbed the “uncrowned champion.” Impressive wins over formidable foes Eddie Ran, Wesley Ramey, and Freddie “Red” Cochrane set up a title bout with Ambers on the September 23, 1937, “Carnival of Champions” show at the Polo Grounds in New York City. Although he was defeated for the world championship (L 15), observers say he deserved the decision against Ambers. Montanez bounced back to continue his winning ways in bouts with Jackie “Kid” Berg and Young Peter Jackson.

Montañez went for the world title two times, losing to Lou Ambers on points. and then Henry Armstrong by a TKO in round 9.

Montañez reached great popularity in Puerto Rico, New York City, and Latin America, and his collection of photos with celebrities is considered one of the largest in Puerto Rico. He had well over 250 pictures with celebrities such as Celia Cruz, Joe Louis, Jersey Joe Walcott, Cantinflas and some former Puerto Rico Governors and other famous people displayed on his house's walls.

Montañez was elected to the Salon de la Fama del Deporte Cayeyano in July 2004.

Montañez has a stadium named after him, the Pedro Montañez Municipal Stadium in Cayey. It is the home of the Toritos de Cayey Double A baseball team, which was named after him, and it also was the Benigno Fernandez Garcia Jr. High School's field day competitions' site.

== Hall of Fame ==
In December 2006, Montañez was elected to the International Boxing Hall of Fame and in 2007 he was inducted into the Boxing Hall of Fame located @ 360 N Peterboro St, Canastota, NY 13032

== Professional boxing record ==
103 fights	91 wins	8 losses
By knockout	51	2
By decision	40	6
Draws	4	

No.	Result	Record	Opponent	Type	Round, time	Date	Age	Location	Notes
103	Loss	91–8–4	George Martin	PTS	8	Oct 29, 1940	26 years, 188 days	Broadway Arena, New York City, New York, US	
102	Loss	91–7–4	Henry Armstrong	TKO	9 (15), 0:47	Jan 24, 1940	25 years, 275 days	Madison Square Garden, New York City, New York, US	For NYSAC, NBA, and The Ring welterweight titles
101	Win	91–6–4	Vince Pimpinella	PTS	8	Sep 7, 1939	25 years, 136 days	Fort Hamilton Arena, New York City, New York, US	
100	Win	90–6–4	Howard Scott	KO	2 (10), 2:02	Aug 22, 1939	25 years, 120 days	Hickey Park, Millvale, Pennsylvania, US	
99	Win	89–6–4	Sigi Lander	KO	2 (8), 2:37	Jul 14, 1939	25 years, 81 days	Long Beach Stadium, Long Beach, New York, US	
98	Loss	88–6–4	Davey Day	TKO	8 (10), 2:37	May 23, 1939	25 years, 29 days	Madison Square Garden, New York City, New York, US	
97	Win	88–5–4	Young Peter Jackson	PTS	10	Apr 25, 1939	25 years, 1 day	Olympic Auditorium, Los Angeles, California, US	
96	Win	87–5–4	Bucky Jones	PTS	8	Apr 13, 1939	24 years, 354 days	Rockland Palace, New York City, New York, US	
95	Win	86–5–4	Phil Furr	KO	1 (8), 1:10	Mar 27, 1939	24 years, 337 days	St. Nicholas Arena, New York City, New York, US	
94	Win	85–5–4	Howard Scott	KO	2 (8), 2:26	Mar 21, 1939	24 years, 331 days	New York Coliseum, New York City, New York, US	
93	Win	84–5–4	Jack 'Kid' Berg	TKO	5 (10)	Mar 10, 1939	24 years, 320 days	Hippodrome, New York City, New York, US	
92	Win	83–5–4	Werther Arcelli	KO	1 (10), 2:48	Feb 25, 1939	24 years, 307 days	Rockland Palace, New York City, New York, US	
91	Win	82–5–4	Jimmy Vaughn	PTS	8	Jan 31, 1939	24 years, 282 days	New York Coliseum, New York City, New York, US	
90	Win	81–5–4	Ambrose Logan	TKO	5 (10), 1:31	Jan 20, 1939	24 years, 271 days	Hippodrome, New York City, New York, US	
89	Win	80–5–4	Tommy Rawson Jr.	KO	2 (10), 1:31	Jan 10, 1939	24 years, 261 days	New York Coliseum, New York City, New York, US	
88	Win	79–5–4	Lew Raymond	TKO	3 (8)	Dec 31, 1938	24 years, 251 days	Ridgewood Grove, New York City, New York, US	
87	Win	78–5–4	Jimmy Fantini	KO	3 (8), 2:51	Dec 15, 1938	24 years, 235 days	Prospect Hall, New York City, New York, US	
86	Win	77–5–4	Vincenzo Servino	TKO	2 (8)	Dec 8, 1938	24 years, 228 days	Prospect Hall, New York City, New York, US	
85	Win	76–5–4	Jimmy Garrison	PTS	10	Sep 16, 1938	24 years, 145 days	Madison Square Garden, New York City, New York, US	
84	Win	75–5–4	Orville Drouillard	TKO	5 (10), 2:14	Aug 24, 1938	24 years, 122 days	Madison Square Garden, New York City, New York, US	
83	Win	74–5–4	Ray Napolitano	TKO	3 (8)	Aug 16, 1938	24 years, 114 days	Queensboro Arena, New York City, New York, US	
82	Draw	73–5–4	Tommy Cross	PTS	10	Apr 25, 1938	24 years, 1 day	Arena, Philadelphia, Pennsylvania, US	
81	Win	73–5–3	Norment Quarles	PTS	10	Feb 21, 1938	23 years, 303 days	Arena, Philadelphia, Pennsylvania, US	
80	Win	72–5–3	Tommy Speigal	UD	10	Feb 7, 1938	23 years, 289 days	Motor Square Garden, Pittsburgh, Pennsylvania, US	
79	Win	71–5–3	Joe Pennino	KO	3 (10)	Nov 23, 1937	23 years, 213 days	Broadway Arena, New York City, New York, US	
78	Win	70–5–3	Ray Nash	KO	1 (8), 2:30	Nov 8, 1937	23 years, 198 days	Westchester County Center, White Plains, New York, US	
77	Win	69–5–3	Pete Caracciola	PTS	8	Oct 30, 1937	23 years, 189 days	Ridgewood Grove, New York City, New York, US	
76	Win	68–5–3	Joey Straiges	RTD	4 (8)	Oct 23, 1937	23 years, 182 days	Rockland Palace, New York City, New York, US	
75	Loss	67–5–3	Lou Ambers	MD	15	Sep 23, 1937	23 years, 152 days	Polo Grounds, New York City, New York, US	For NYSAC, NBA, and The Ring lightweight titles
74	Win	67–4–3	Lew Massey	TKO	3 (10)	Aug 23, 1937	23 years, 121 days	Arena Stadium, Philadelphia, Pennsylvania, US	
73	Win	66–4–3	Freddie 'Red' Cochrane	KO	2 (10), 0:35	Aug 16, 1937	23 years, 114 days	Braddock Bowl, Jersey City, New Jersey, US	
72	Win	65–4–3	Wesley Ramey	KO	1 (10), 2:40	Jul 26, 1937	23 years, 93 days	Gilmore Stadium, Los Angeles, California, US	
71	Win	64–4–3	Frankie Wallace	PTS	10	Jul 4, 1937	23 years, 71 days	Escambron Baseball Park, San Juan, Puerto Rico	
70	Win	63–4–3	Phil Baker	KO	2 (10)	Jun 7, 1937	23 years, 44 days	Dyckman Oval, New York City, New York, US	
69	Win	62–4–3	Eddie Ran	KO	6 (10)	Apr 15, 1937	22 years, 356 days	Star Casino, New York City, New York, US	
68	Win	61–4–3	Lou Ambers	UD	10	Apr 5, 1937	22 years, 346 days	Ridgewood Grove, New York City, New York, US	
67	Win	60–4–3	Nick Pastore	KO	7 (8)	Mar 13, 1937	22 years, 323 days	Ridgewood Grove, New York City, New York, US	
66	Win	59–4–3	Enrico Venturi	UD	15	Feb 26, 1937	22 years, 308 days	Madison Square Garden, New York City, New York, US	
65	Win	58–4–3	Willie Hines	KO	2 (8)	Feb 20, 1937	22 years, 302 days	Ridgewood Grove, New York City, New York, US	
64	Win	57–4–3	Al Dunbar	KO	1 (8)	Feb 13, 1937	22 years, 295 days	Rockland Palace, New York City, New York, US	
63	Win	56–4–3	Joe LaFauci	KO	2 (8)	Feb 4, 1937	22 years, 286 days	Star Casino, New York City, New York, US	
62	Win	55–4–3	Steve Halaiko	KO	3 (10), 0:45	Dec 23, 1936	22 years, 243 days	Escambron Baseball Park, San Juan, Puerto Rico	
61	Win	54–4–3	Eddie Brink	PTS	10	Aug 24, 1936	22 years, 122 days	Dyckman Oval, New York City, New York, US	
60	Win	53–4–3	Frankie Klick	PTS	10	Jun 8, 1936	22 years, 45 days	Dyckman Oval, New York City, New York, US	
59	Win	52–4–3	Leonard Del Genio	PTS	10	May 15, 1936	22 years, 21 days	Madison Square Garden, New York City, New York, US	
58	Win	51–4–3	Aldo Spoldi	PTS	10	Apr 27, 1936	22 years, 3 days	St. Nicholas Arena, New York City, New York, US	
57	Win	50–4–3	Lou Jallos	KO	7 (10)	Apr 15, 1936	21 years, 357 days	Star Casino, New York City, New York, US	
56	Win	49–4–3	Bobby Pacho	PTS	10	Mar 23, 1936	21 years, 334 days	St. Nicholas Arena, New York City, New York, US	
55	Win	48–4–3	Joey Costa	PTS	8	Mar 14, 1936	21 years, 325 days	Ridgewood Grove, New York City, New York, US	
54	Win	47–4–3	Paris Apice	TKO	6 (10), 2:56	Feb 12, 1936	21 years, 294 days	Star Casino, New York City, New York, US	
53	Win	46–4–3	Al Roth	PTS	10	Feb 3, 1936	21 years, 285 days	St. Nicholas Arena, New York City, New York, US	
52	Win	45–4–3	Jimmy Murray	TKO	5 (8)	Dec 21, 1935	21 years, 241 days	Ridgewood Grove, New York City, New York, US	
51	Win	44–4–3	Joey Zodda	KO	1 (10)	Dec 11, 1935	21 years, 231 days	Star Casino, New York City, New York, US	
50	Win	43–4–3	Pete Mascia	PTS	8	Nov 30, 1935	21 years, 220 days	Ridgewood Grove, New York City, New York, US	
49	Win	42–4–3	Jack Stanley	KO	3 (10)	Nov 20, 1935	21 years, 210 days	Star Casino, New York City, New York, US	
48	Win	41–4–3	Johnny Morro	TKO	4 (10), 1:13	Nov 14, 1935	21 years, 204 days	New York Coliseum, New York City, New York, US	
47	Win	40–4–3	Joey Greb	KO	2 (8)	Nov 8, 1935	21 years, 198 days	Stauch's Arena, New York City, New York, US	
46	Win	39–4–3	Phil Rafferty	PTS	10	Oct 30, 1935	21 years, 189 days	Star Casino, New York City, New York, US	
45	Win	38–4–3	Steve Halaiko	UD	10	Oct 16, 1935	21 years, 175 days	Star Casino, New York City, New York, US	
44	Win	37–4–3	Carlo Orlandi	TKO	10 (10)	Jul 14, 1935	21 years, 81 days	Velodromo Vigorelli, Milan, Italy	
43	Win	36–4–3	Gheorghe Covaci	PTS	10	May 10, 1935	21 years, 16 days	Salle Wagram, Paris, France	
42	Win	35–4–3	Harry Brooks	PTS	10	Apr 21, 1935	20 years, 362 days	The Arena, Mile End, London, England, UK	
41	Draw	34–4–3	Saverio Turiello	PTS	10	Apr 15, 1935	20 years, 356 days	Teatro Puccini, Milan, Italy	
40	Win	34–4–2	George Odwell	KO	2 (10)	Mar 31, 1935	20 years, 341 days	Devonshire Club, Hackney, London, England, UK	
39	Win	33–4–2	Victor Denyl	KO	3 (10)	Mar 19, 1935	20 years, 329 days	Central Sporting Club, Paris, France	
38	Win	32–4–2	Tommy Dowlais	KO	3 (12)	Mar 10, 1935	20 years, 320 days	Devonshire Club, Hackney, London, England, UK	
37	Win	31–4–2	Roger Simende	KO	8 (10)	Mar 5, 1935	20 years, 315 days	Central Sporting Club, Paris, France	
36	Win	30–4–2	Roland Courant	KO	5 (10)	Feb 16, 1935	20 years, 298 days	Central Sporting Club, Paris, France	
35	Win	29–4–2	Hajik Sandjack	TKO	4 (6)	Jan 28, 1935	20 years, 279 days	Palais des Sports, Paris, France	
34	Win	28–4–2	Raymond Defer	KO	6 (10)	Jan 11, 1935	20 years, 262 days	Salle Wagram, Paris, France	
33	Win	27–4–2	Maurice Arnault	PTS	6	Dec 24, 1934	20 years, 244 days	Palais des Sports, Paris, France	
32	Win	26–4–2	Kid Zenti	TKO	2 (6)	Dec 5, 1934	20 years, 225 days	Salle Wagram, Paris, France	
31	Win	25–4–2	Ramon Badia	KO	3 (10)	Sep 28, 1934	20 years, 157 days	Teatro Circo Price, Madrid, Spain	
30	Win	24–4–2	Cipriano Torres	KO	2 (10)	Aug 22, 1934	20 years, 120 days	Teatro Circo Olympia, Barcelona, Spain	
29	Win	23–4–2	Guillermo Ruiz	TKO	8 (10)	Jul 18, 1934	20 years, 85 days	Teatro Circo Olympia, Barcelona, Spain	
28	Win	22–4–2	Jose Mico	KO	2 (10)	Jun 27, 1934	20 years, 64 days	Teatro Circo Olympia, Barcelona, Spain	
27	Win	21–4–2	Miguel Martinez	TKO	4 (10)	Jun 20, 1934	20 years, 57 days	Teatro Circo Olympia, Barcelona, Spain	
26	Win	20–4–2	Juan Llanguas	TKO	4 (10)	May 2, 1934	20 years, 8 days	Salón Nuevo Mundo, Barcelona, Spain	
25	Win	19–4–2	Felix Perez	TKO	7 (10)	Mar 7, 1934	19 years, 317 days	Salón Nuevo Mundo, Barcelona, Spain	
24	Loss	18–4–2	Felipe Andrade	PTS	10	Sep 29, 1933	19 years, 158 days	Victory Garden Stadium, San Juan, Puerto Rico	
23	Loss	18–3–2	Felipe Andrade	PTS	10	Aug 27, 1933	19 years, 125 days	Victory Garden Stadium, San Juan, Puerto Rico	Lost Puerto Rican lightweight title
22	Win	18–2–2	Emilio Morris	PTS	10	Jul 4, 1933	19 years, 71 days	Victory Garden Stadium, San Juan, Puerto Rico	Won Puerto Rican lightweight title
21	Win	17–2–2	Jesus Rodil	PTS	8	May 20, 1933	19 years, 26 days	Caracas, Venezuela	
20	Win	16–2–2	Franz Duebbers	PTS	10	Apr 26, 1933	19 years, 2 days	Caracas, Venezuela	Retained Venezuelan lightweight title
19	Draw	15–2–2	Firpo Zuliano	PTS	8	Apr 16, 1933	18 years, 357 days	Caracas, Venezuela	
18	Win	15–2–1	Emilio Morris	PTS	10	Sep 18, 1932	18 years, 147 days	San Juan Stadium, San Juan, Puerto Rico	Won Puerto Rican lightweight title
17	Win	14–2–1	Hector Chafferdet	PTS	10	Jul 17, 1932	18 years, 84 days	Caracas, Venezuela	Won vacant Venezuelan lightweight title
16	Win	13–2–1	Pedro Ruiz	KO	4 (10)	Jun 26, 1932	18 years, 41 days	Caracas, Venezuela	
15	Win	12–2–1	Meliton Aragon	PTS	10	Jun 4, 1932	18 years, 41 days	Caracas, Venezuela	
14	Win	11–2–1	Ramon Bordelies	PTS	8	May 7, 1932	18 years, 13 days	Caracas, Venezuela	
13	Win	10–2–1	Johnny Alba	PTS	8	Apr 23, 1932	17 years, 365 days	Caracas, Venezuela	
12	Win	9–2–1	Johnny Alba	PTS	8	Apr 9, 1932	17 years, 351 days	Caracas, Venezuela	
11	Draw	8–2–1	Sindulfo Diaz	PTS	8	Feb 27, 1932	17 years, 309 days	Caracas, Venezuela	
10	Win	8–2	Carlos Flores	PTS	8	Oct 4, 1931	17 years, 163 days	Caracas, Venezuela	
9	Loss	7–2	Firpo Zuliano	PTS	10	Sep 13, 1931	17 years, 142 days	Caracas, Venezuela	
8	Loss	7–1	Hector Chafferdet	PTS	8	Aug 10, 1931	17 years, 108 days	Caracas, Venezuela	
7	Win	7–0	Kid Langford	PTS	10	Jul 25, 1931	17 years, 92 days	Caracas, Venezuela	
6	Win	6–0	Julio Greaves	PTS	6	Jul 18, 1931	17 years, 85 days	Caracas, Venezuela	
5	Win	5–0	Guillermo Nelson	PTS	8	Jun 28, 1931	17 years, 65 days	San Juan Stadium, San Juan, Puerto Rico	
4	Win	4–0	Pedro Mendoza	KO	1 (4)	Jun 21, 1931	17 years, 58 days	San Juan Stadium, San Juan, Puerto Rico	
3	Win	3–0	Vicente Abadia	PTS	6	May 10, 1931	17 years, 16 days	San Juan Stadium, San Juan, Puerto Rico	
2	Win	2–0	Juan Sanchez	PTS	6	Apr 19, 1931	16 years, 360 days	San Juan Stadium, San Juan, Puerto Rico	
1	Win	1–0	Antonio Melendez	PTS	6	Feb 1, 1931	16 years, 283 days	Victory Garden Stadium, San Juan, Puerto Rico	

Puerto Ricans in the International Boxing Hall of Fame

Number	Name	Year inducted	Notes
1	Carlos Ortíz	1991	World Jr. Welterweight Champion 1959 June 12- 1960, September 1, WBA Lightweight Champion 1962 Apr 21 – 1965 Apr 10, WBC Lightweight Champion 1963 Apr 7 – 1965 Apr 10, WBC Lightweight Champion 1965 Nov 13 – 1968 Jun 29.
2	Wilfred Benítez	1994	The youngest world champion in boxing history. WBA Light Welterweight Champion 1976 Mar 6 – 1977, WBC Welterweight Champion 1979 Jan 14 – 1979 Nov 30, WBC Light Middleweight Champion.
3	Wilfredo Gómez	1995	WBC Super Bantamweight Champion 1977 May 21 – 1983, WBC Featherweight Champion 1984 Mar 31 – 1984 Dec 8, WBA Super Featherweight Champion 1985 May 19 – 1986 May 24.
4	José "Chegui" Torres	1997	Won a silver medal in the junior middleweight at the 1956 Olympic Games. Undisputed Light Heavyweight Champion 1965 Mar 30 – 1966 Dec 16
5	Sixto Escobar	2002	Puerto Rico's first boxing champion. World Bantamweight Champion 15 Nov 1935– 23 Sep 1937, World Bantamweight Champion 20 Feb 1938– Oct 1939
6	Edwin Rosario	2006	Ranks #36 on the list of "100 Greatest Punchers of All Time." according to Ring Magazine. WBC Lightweight Champion 1983 May 1 – 1984 Nov 3, WBA Lightweight Champion 1986 Sep 26 – 1987 Nov 21, WBA Lightweight Champion 199 Jul 9 – 1990 Apr 4, WBA Light Welterweight Champion 1991 Jun 14 – 1992 Apr 10.
7	Pedro Montañez	2007	92 wins out of 103 fights. Never held a title.
8	Joe Cortez	2011	The first Puerto Rican boxing referee to be inducted into the Boxing Hall of Fame
9	Herbert "Cocoa Kid" Hardwick	2012	Member of boxing's "Black Murderers' Row". World Colored Welterweight Championship - June 11, 1937 to August 22, 1938; World Colored Middleweight Championship - January 11, 1940 until the title went extinct in the 1940s; World Colored Middleweight Championship - January 15, 1943 until the title went extinct in the 1940s
10	Félix "Tito" Trinidad	2014	Captured the IBF welterweight crown in his 20th pro bout. Won the WBA light middleweight title from David Reid in March 2000 and later that year unified titles with a 12th-round knockout against IBF champ Fernando Vargas. In 2001 became a three-division champion.
11	Héctor "Macho" Camacho	2016	First boxer to be recognized as a septuple champion in history (counting championships from minor sanctioning bodies). WBC Super Featherweight Championship - August 7, 1983 – 1984, WBC Lightweight Championship - August 10, 1985 – 1987, WBO Light Welterweight Champion - March 6, 1989 – February 23, 1991, WBO Light Welterweight Champion - May 18, 1991–1992.
12	Mario Rivera Martino	2019	First Puerto Rican boxing sports writer to be inducted into the International Boxing Hall of Fame. He served Puerto Rican boxing for more than 50 years as a writer and eventual commissioner.
13	Miguel Cotto	2022	He is a multiple-time world champion, and the first Puerto Rican boxer to win world titles in four weight classes, from light welterweight to middleweight. In 2007 and 2009,

= Indicates the person is no longer alive14 ivan Calderon

== See also ==
- List of Puerto Ricans
- Sports in Puerto Rico
- Boxing in Puerto Rico
