= Eddie Booker =

American boxer (1917–1975)

Eddie Brooker
Personal information
- Nickname: Black Dynamite
- Nationality: American
- Born: Hilton Edward Booker; November 5, 1917
- Died: January 26, 1975 (aged 57) San Francisco, California, U.S.
- Height: 5 ft 9 in (1.75 m)
- Weight: Middleweight; Light-heavyweight

Boxing career
- Reach: 73 in (185 cm)
- Stance: Orthodox

Boxing record
- Total fights: 79
- Wins: 66
- Win by KO: 33
- Losses: 5
- Draws: 8

Hilton Edward Booker (November 5, 1917 – January 26, 1975) was an American boxer who was active during the 1930s and 1940s.

Booker was one of the famous "Murderers Row" group of black boxers, along with the likes of Charley Burley, Holman Williams and Jack Chase, avoided by other elite fighters of the era because of their ability and their skin colour. Booker compiled a record of 66-5-8, which included a (1-1-1) record vs. Holman Williams, (0-1) record vs. Jack Chase, (1-0) vs. Lloyd Marshall, (0-1) Cocoa Kid. Other Notable Booker fights include a (1-0-2) record vs. Archie Moore (being the first to knock him out) a win over Harry Matthews, a loss to Fritzie Zivic and a (2-1-1) record vs Shorty Hogue. Like all black murderer's row fighters, he never got an opportunity to fight for a world title. Booker was forced to retire prematurely due to an eye injury. He was a 2017 inductee of the International Boxing Hall of Fame.

World Champion Archie Moore thought the world of Booker saying, “I’ve had some rough fights in my time,” Moore said, “but all things being equal, when I was in my prime, one of my toughest had to have been against Eddie Booker, a fighting machine … who shot out punches with deft precision … [Booker] was one of the great fighters of my time. He had me fighting for dear life.”

Booker was blind later in life due to eye injuries suffered from an illegally doctored glove. He died in San Francisco on January 26, 1975 at 57 years old.

== Professional boxing record ==
79 fights	66 wins	5 losses
By knockout	33	0
By decision	33	5
Draws	8	

No.	Result	Record	Opponent	Type	Round	Date	Location	Notes
79	Win	66–5–8	Holman Williams	PTS	10	Mar 6, 1944	Civic Auditorium, San Francisco, California, U.S.	
78	Win	65–5–8	Frankie Nelson	PTS	10	Feb 23, 1944	Auditorium, Oakland, California, U.S.	
77	Win	64–5–8	Archie Moore	TKO	8 (10)	Jan 21, 1944	Legion Stadium, Hollywood, California, U.S.	
76	Win	63–5–8	Paul Hartnek	TKO	6 (10)	Jan 5, 1944	Coliseum Bowl, San Francisco, California, U.S.	
75	Loss	62–5–8	Holman Williams	PTS	12	Nov 19, 1943	Coliseum Bowl, San Francisco, California, U.S.	
74	Win	62–4–8	Van McNutt	TKO	5 (10)	Oct 18, 1943	Coliseum Bowl, San Francisco, California, U.S.	
73	Win	61–4–8	Harry Matthews	TKO	5 (10)	Aug 9, 1943	Coliseum Bowl, San Francisco, California, U.S.	
72	Loss	60–4–8	Jack Chase	PTS	15	Jan 11, 1943	Civic Auditorium, San Francisco, California, U.S.	Lost USA California State middleweight title
71	Draw	60–3–8	Archie Moore	PTS	12	Dec 11, 1942	Coliseum, San Diego, California, U.S.	Retained USA California State middleweight title
70	Win	60–3–7	Lloyd Marshall	PTS	10	Sep 28, 1942	Civic Auditorium, San Francisco, California, U.S.	
69	Win	59–3–7	Big Boy Hogue	TKO	4 (12)	Sep 18, 1942	Coliseum, San Diego, California, U.S.	Retained USA California State middleweight title
68	Win	58–3–7	Bobby Birch	UD	12	Sep 4, 1942	Coliseum, San Diego, California, U.S.	Retained USA California State middleweight title
67	Win	57–3–7	Izzy Jannazzo	PTS	10	Aug 24, 1942	Coliseum Bowl, San Francisco, California, U.S.	
66	Win	56–3–7	Shorty Hogue	RTD	8 (10)	Aug 14, 1942	Coliseum, San Diego, California, U.S.	Won USA California State middleweight title
65	Win	55–3–7	Costello Cruz	PTS	10	Jul 15, 1942	Auditorium, Oakland, California, U.S.	
64	Draw	54–3–7	Johnny 'Bandit' Romero	PTS	10	May 1, 1942	Coliseum, San Diego, California, U.S.	
63	Win	54–3–6	Billy Connerty	TKO	3 (10)	Dec 1, 1941	Billings, California, U.S.	
62	Loss	53–3–6	Shorty Hogue	PTS	10	Aug 22, 1941	Coliseum, San Diego, California, U.S.	Lost USA California State middleweight title
61	Win	53–2–6	Jimmy McDaniels	PTS	10	Aug 19, 1941	Olympic Auditorium, Los Angeles, California, U.S.	Retained USA California State middleweight title
60	Win	52–2–6	Henryk Chmielewski	TKO	9 (10)	Aug 11, 1941	Civic Auditorium, San Francisco, California, U.S.	
59	Win	51–2–6	Charley Harris	KO	6 (10)	Jul 18, 1941	Coliseum, San Diego, California, U.S.	Retained USA California State middleweight title
58	Win	50–2–6	Charley Simpson	PTS	10	Jul 10, 1941	Civic Auditorium, San Jose, California, U.S.	Retained USA California State middleweight title
57	Win	49–2–6	Jimmy McDaniels	PTS	10	Jul 8, 1941	Olympic Auditorium, Los Angeles, California, U.S.	Retained USA California State middleweight title
56	Win	48–2–6	Johnny Dias	TKO	8 (10)	Jun 16, 1941	Coliseum Bowl, San Francisco, California, U.S.	
55	Win	47–2–6	Shorty Hogue	PTS	10	May 2, 1941	Coliseum, San Diego, California, U.S.	Won vacant USA California State middleweight title
54	Win	46–2–6	Leon Zorrita	PTS	10	Apr 25, 1941	Coliseum, San Diego, California, U.S.	
53	Win	45–2–6	Freddie Dixon	PTS	10	Apr 4, 1941	Coliseum, San Diego, California, U.S.	
52	Draw	44–2–6	Shorty Hogue	PTS	10	Mar 14, 1941	Coliseum, San Diego, California, U.S.	
51	Draw	44–2–5	Archie Moore	PTS	10	Feb 21, 1941	Coliseum, San Diego, California, U.S.	
50	Win	44–2–4	Milo Theodorescu	PTS	10	Feb 12, 1941	Auditorium, Oakland, California, U.S.	
49	Win	43–2–4	Chester Parks	KO	1 (8)	Feb 4, 1941	Civic Auditorium, San Jose, California, U.S.	
48	Win	42–2–4	Bobby Pacho	PTS	10	Apr 9, 1940	Civic Auditorium, San Jose, California, U.S.	
47	Win	41–2–4	Bobby Pacho	PTS	10	Dec 18, 1939	National Hall, San Francisco, California, U.S.	
46	Win	40–2–4	Ray Vargas	KO	2 (10)	Nov 29, 1939	National Hall, San Francisco, California, U.S.	
45	Win	39–2–4	Henry Majcher	TKO	7 (10)	Nov 13, 1939	National Hall, San Francisco, California, U.S.	
44	Win	38–2–4	Carlos Garcia	KO	3 (10)	Oct 3, 1939	San Jose, California, U.S.	
43	Loss	37–2–4	Herbert Lewis Hardwick	PTS	10	Mar 9, 1939	Arena, New Haven, Connecticut, U.S.	
42	Loss	37–1–4	Fritzie Zivic	PTS	8	Feb 10, 1939	Madison Square Garden, Manhattan, New York City, New York, U.S.	
41	Draw	37–0–4	Holman Williams	PTS	6	Jan 25, 1939	Madison Square Garden, Manhattan, New York City, New York, U.S.	
40	Win	37–0–3	Oscar Suggs	TKO	3 (6)	Jan 9, 1939	Arena, New Haven, Connecticut, U.S.	
39	Win	36–0–3	Unknown Morgan	KO	3 (6)	Dec 20, 1938	Arena, New Haven, Connecticut, U.S.	
38	Win	35–0–3	Lew Raymond	PTS	6	Dec 9, 1938	Hippodrome, Manhattan, New York City, New York, U.S.	
37	Win	34–0–3	Demosthenes Wakerlis	PTS	6	Nov 18, 1938	Madison Square Garden, Manhattan, New York City, New York, U.S.	
36	Win	33–0–3	Carlos Miranda	TKO	3 (10)	Jul 1, 1938	Dreamland Auditorium, San Francisco, California, U.S.	
35	Win	32–0–3	George Salvadore	TKO	7 (10)	Jun 24, 1938	Dreamland Auditorium, San Francisco, California, U.S.	
34	Win	31–0–3	Al Manfredo	PTS	10	Jun 10, 1938	Dreamland Auditorium, San Francisco, California, U.S.	
33	Win	30–0–3	Andy Callahan	PTS	10	Mar 3, 1938	Dreamland Auditorium, San Francisco, California, U.S.	
32	Draw	29–0–3	Mickey Duris	PTS	10	Jan 14, 1938	Dreamland Auditorium, San Francisco, California, U.S.	
31	Draw	29–0–2	Jackie Burke	PTS	10	Oct 8, 1937	Dreamland Auditorium, San Francisco, California, U.S.	
30	Win	29–0–1	Gaston LeCadre	TKO	9 (10)	Aug 27, 1937	Dreamland Auditorium, San Francisco, California, U.S.	
29	Win	28–0–1	Johnny Bassanelli	TKO	9 (10)	Jul 30, 1937	Dreamland Auditorium, San Francisco, California, U.S.	
28	Win	27–0–1	Johnny Foster	PTS	6	May 5, 1937	Auditorium, Oakland, California, U.S.	
27	Win	26–0–1	Remo Fernandez	PTS	6	Mar 12, 1937	Dreamland Auditorium, San Francisco, California, U.S.	
26	Win	25–0–1	Remo Fernandez	PTS	10	Jan 26, 1937	Civic Auditorium, San Jose, California, U.S.	
25	Win	24–0–1	Gale Harrington	PTS	10	Nov 24, 1936	Civic Auditorium, San Jose, California, U.S.	
24	Win	23–0–1	Jimmy Wakefield	PTS	10	Sep 29, 1936	Civic Auditorium, San Jose, California, U.S.	
23	Win	22–0–1	Billy Azevedo	PTS	10	Sep 1, 1936	Civic Auditorium, San Jose, California, U.S.	
22	Draw	21–0–1	Jimmy Wakefield	PTS	10	Aug 4, 1936	Civic Auditorium, San Jose, California, U.S.	
21	Win	21–0	Billy Azevedo	TKO	5 (6)	Jul 21, 1936	Civic Auditorium, San Jose, California, U.S.	
20	Win	20–0	Johnny Foster	TKO	4 (6)	Jul 10, 1936	Dreamland Auditorium, San Francisco, California, U.S.	
19	Win	19–0	Billy Azevedo	TKO	3 (6)	Jun 5, 1936	Dreamland Auditorium, San Francisco, California, U.S.	
18	Win	18–0	Johnny Foster	TKO	1 (6)	May 1, 1936	Dreamland Auditorium, San Francisco, California, U.S.	
17	Win	17–0	Mickey Barker	TKO	4 (6)	Apr 13, 1936	Sports Palace, San Francisco, California, U.S.	
16	Win	16–0	Tony O'Dell	TKO	1 (6)	Dec 30, 1935	Civic Auditorium, San Francisco, California, U.S.	
15	Win	15–0	Johnny Foster	PTS	4	Dec 18, 1935	Civic Auditorium, San Francisco, California, U.S.	
14	Win	14–0	Frankie Marino	TKO	1 (6)	Nov 27, 1935	Civic Auditorium, San Francisco, California, U.S.	
13	Win	13–0	Johnny Natalie	TKO	3 (?)	Oct 22, 1935	Vallejo, California, U.S.	
12	Win	12–0	Al Rossi	TKO	3 (4)	Oct 16, 1935	Civic Auditorium, San Francisco, California, U.S.	
11	Win	11–0	Johnny Foster	PTS	4	Sep 4, 1935	Civic Auditorium, San Francisco, California, U.S.	
10	Win	10–0	Mickey Gibbons	PTS	4	Aug 7, 1935	Civic Auditorium, San Francisco, California, U.S.	
9	Win	9–0	Al Evans	TKO	3 (4)	Jul 16, 1935	San Jose, California, U.S.	
8	Win	8–0	Joe Aguilar	PTS	4	Jul 2, 1935	San Jose, California, U.S.	
7	Win	7–0	Al LaBoa	PTS	4	May 28, 1935	San Jose, California, U.S.	
6	Win	6–0	Joe Aguilar	PTS	4	Apr 3, 1935	Auditorium, Oakland, California, U.S.	
5	Win	5–0	Johnny Natalie	PTS	4	Mar 20, 1935	Auditorium, Oakland, California, U.S.	
4	Win	4–0	Johnny Bassanellif	PTS	4	Mar 6, 1935	Auditorium, Oakland, California, U.S.	
3	Win	3–0	Joe Pablo	KO	1 (4)	Feb 27, 1935	Auditorium, Oakland, California, U.S.	
2	Win	2–0	Johnny Mateo	KO	2 (4)	Jan 22, 1935	Forman's Arena, San Jose, California, U.S.	
1	Win	1–0	Ray Lewis	KO	1 (4)	Jan 15, 1935	Forman's Arena, San Jose, California, U.S.	

== See also ==
- Murderers' Row (Boxing)
