= Mario Rivera Martinó =

Puerto Rican sports journalist (1924–2017)

- Born: April 20, 1924; Toa Alta, Puerto Rico
- Died: September 13, 2017 (aged 93); Orlando, Florida
- Occupations: Journalist, sports writer and President of the Puerto Rico Boxing Commission

Notes
- Was inducted into the International Boxing Hall of Fame in June, 2019.

Mario Rivera Martinó (April 20, 1924 – September 13, 2017) was a journalist, sports writer and President of the Puerto Rico Boxing Commission. In 2006, he was inducted into the Puerto Rican Sports Hall of Fame. In December 2018, the International Boxing Hall of Fame announced that Rivera Martinó would be inducted into their hall of fame during their 30th annual induction ceremonies which were held from June 6 to 9, 2019 in Canastota, New York.

== Early years ==
Rivera Martinó was one of nine siblings born to Nicolás Rivera Muñiz and María Luisa Martino Muler in the town of Toa Alta, Puerto Rico. In 1930, when he was six years old, his family moved to New York City. There he received his primary and secondary education. He helped his family economically by shining shoes.

According to Rivera Martinó, on one occasion in 1935, Puerto Rican boxer Pedro Montañez came up him with scuffed shoes. Montañez was recognized by Ring Magazine as one of history's most prolific knockout winners with 56 knockout wins, and one of the Latinos with the most knockout wins—while only being knocked out twice himself. He also ranks as number 14 in boxing history, also recognized by Ring Magazine, among boxers with most wins in a row, totalling 88 wins in a row. Rivera Martinó did not hesitate and shined Montañez's shoes. He was quoted as saying the following:

“I had the honor of being his shoe-shine boy”

Rivera Martinó joined the United States Army in 1942, serving during World War II. The Ring, an American boxing magazine, gave him the assignment of covering Joe Louis’s tour of Army camps. The Army had placed Louis in its Special Services Division rather than sending him into combat. Louis went on a celebrity tour with other notables, including fellow boxer Sugar Ray Robinson. Rivera Martinó served actively in the Army as a reporter until his honorable discharge from the Army in 1944.

== Career ==
Rivera Martinó returned to New York City and in 1945, he filed his first report with The Ring. He moved to Puerto Rico in 1948 and continued to write for The Ring, being their Puerto Rico correspondent for the next 50 years. He wrote both in English and Spanish thus, turning boxing around with his Hispanic touch. He is the first professional chronicler of the Caribbean who was dramatically inserted in international boxing. Rivera Martinó also had a boxing sports column in The San Juan Star, a local Puerto Rican newspaper. In 1950, he wrote his first ringside report for the magazine.

Among the Puerto Rican boxers which he covered on the ringside were Jose "Chegüi" Torres, Carlos Ortiz, Esteban de Jesús, Edwin "El Chapo" Rosario, Wilfredo "Bazooka" Gomez and Félix "Tito" Trinidad. His list of the 10 greatest Puerto Rican-born fighters of all-time are the following:

1. Wilfredo "Bazooka" Gomez (44–3–1, 42 KOs)
2. Carlos Ortiz (61–7–1, 30 KOs)
3. Felix "Tito" Trinidad (42–3, 35 KOs)
4. Edwin "El Chapo" Rosario (47–6, 41 KOs)
5. Miguel Cotto (41–6, 33 KOs)
6. Esteban de Jesus (58–5, 33 KOs)
7. Sixto Escobar (43–22–3, 19 KOs)
8. Pedro Montanez (92–7–4, 54 KOs)
9. Jose "Chegüi" Torres (41–3–1, 29 KOs)
10. Alfredo Escalera (53–14–3, 31 KOs)

Rivera Martinó was appointed boxing commissioner of Puerto Rico in 1991 and in 1992 was appointed president of the Puerto Rico Boxing Commission. From 1996 to 2010, he served as the public relations officer of the World Boxing Organization.

In 2006, Rivera Martinó was inducted into the Hall of Fame of Puerto Rican Sports. He donated much of his boxing collection to that institution, including his entire collection of The Ring editions since 1948.

== Later years ==
On February 4, 2009, Rivera Martinó incorporated the "MARIO RIVERA MARTINÓ FOUNDATION Inc." whose mission is to provide educational methods, such as tutorials, materials, fees, professional and amateur boxer exams to promote education and combat social problems.

Rivera Martinó moved to Orlando, Florida. He had a weak heart and was suffering from health issues. Apparently his health situation became complicated when he came down with pneumonia and was therefore, hospitalized. Rivera Martinó was unable to recuperate his health and on September 13, 2017, he died. His funeral was held at the Funeraria San Juan which is located at 3189 South John Young PKWY in Kissimmee, Florida. He was 93 years old. He was buried at the Florida National Cemetery in Bushnell, Florida.

Rivera Martinó was posthumously nominated to be enshrined into the International Boxing Hall of Fame in 2019. He was officially inducted during the International Boxing Hall of Fame weekend ceremonies in June, 2019.

Puerto Ricans in the International Boxing Hall of Fame

Number	Name	Year inducted	Notes
1	Carlos Ortíz	1991	World Jr. Welterweight Champion 1959 June 12- 1960, September 1, WBA Lightweight Champion 1962 Apr 21 – 1965 Apr 10, WBC Lightweight Champion 1963 Apr 7 – 1965 Apr 10, WBC Lightweight Champion 1965 Nov 13 – 1968 Jun 29.
2	Wilfred Benítez	1994	The youngest world champion in boxing history. WBA Light Welterweight Champion 1976 Mar 6 – 1977, WBC Welterweight Champion 1979 Jan 14 – 1979 Nov 30, WBC Light Middleweight Champion.
3	Wilfredo Gómez	1995	WBC Super Bantamweight Champion 1977 May 21 – 1983, WBC Featherweight Champion 1984 Mar 31 – 1984 Dec 8, WBA Super Featherweight Champion 1985 May 19 – 1986 May 24.
4	José "Chegui" Torres	1997	Won a silver medal in the junior middleweight at the 1956 Olympic Games. Undisputed Light Heavyweight Champion 1965 Mar 30 – 1966 Dec 16
5	Sixto Escobar	2002	Puerto Rico's first boxing champion. World Bantamweight Champion 15 Nov 1935– 23 Sep 1937, World Bantamweight Champion 20 Feb 1938– Oct 1939
6	Edwin Rosario	2006	Ranks #36 on the list of "100 Greatest Punchers of All Time." according to Ring Magazine. WBC Lightweight Champion 1983 May 1 – 1984 Nov 3, WBA Lightweight Champion 1986 Sep 26 – 1987 Nov 21, WBA Lightweight Champion 199 Jul 9 – 1990 Apr 4, WBA Light Welterweight Champion 1991 Jun 14 – 1992 Apr 10.
7	Pedro Montañez	2007	92 wins out of 103 fights. Never held a title.
8	Joe Cortez	2011	The first Puerto Rican boxing referee to be inducted into the Boxing Hall of Fame
9	Herbert "Cocoa Kid" Hardwick	2012	Member of boxing's "Black Murderers' Row". World Colored Welterweight Championship - June 11, 1937 to August 22, 1938; World Colored Middleweight Championship - January 11, 1940 until the title went extinct in the 1940s; World Colored Middleweight Championship - January 15, 1943 until the title went extinct in the 1940s
10	Félix "Tito" Trinidad	2014	Captured the IBF welterweight crown in his 20th pro bout. Won the WBA light middleweight title from David Reid in March 2000 and later that year unified titles with a 12th-round knockout against IBF champ Fernando Vargas. In 2001 became a three-division champion.
11	Héctor "Macho" Camacho	2016	First boxer to be recognized as a septuple champion in history (counting championships from minor sanctioning bodies). WBC Super Featherweight Championship - August 7, 1983 – 1984, WBC Lightweight Championship - August 10, 1985 – 1987, WBO Light Welterweight Champion - March 6, 1989 – February 23, 1991, WBO Light Welterweight Champion - May 18, 1991–1992.
12	Mario Rivera Martino	2019	First Puerto Rican boxing sports writer to be inducted into the International Boxing Hall of Fame. He served Puerto Rican boxing for more than 50 years as a writer and eventual commissioner.
13	Miguel Cotto	2022	He is a multiple-time world champion, and the first Puerto Rican boxer to win world titles in four weight classes, from light welterweight to middleweight. In 2007 and 2009,

= Indicates the person is no longer alive14 ivan Calderon

== See also ==
- List of Puerto Ricans
- Sports in Puerto Rico
