= Herbert Lewis Hardwick =

Puerto Rican boxer (1914–1966)

Personal information
- Nickname: "Cocoa Kid"
- Born: Herbert Lewis Hardwick; May 2, 1914 Mayaguez, Puerto Rico
- Died: December 27, 1966 (aged 52) Chicago, Illinois, US
- Weight: Welterweight

Boxing career
- Stance: Orthodox

Boxing record
- Total fights: 249
- Wins: 178
- Win by KO: 48
- Losses: 58
- Draws: 11

Herbert Lewis Hardwick Arroyo (Note: He reported that his birth name was Luis Humberto Hardwick Arroyo. His first name was anglicized as "Louis" in his driver's license and he also pronounced his second name as "Elberto".) (May 2, 1914 – December 27, 1966), also known as "Cocoa Kid", was a Puerto Rican boxer of African descent who fought primarily as a welterweight but also in the middleweight division. Hardwick won the World Colored Championships in both divisions. He was a member of boxing's "Black Murderers' Row" and fought the best boxers of his time. He was inducted into the International Boxing Hall of Fame in 2012.

== Early years ==
Hardwick was born in the City of Mayaguez, Puerto Rico, to Maria Arroyo, a native of Puerto Rico, and Lewis Hardwick, an African American Merchant Marine. In 1913, his father was on leave and left the island without knowing that Maria was pregnant with his child. It was only upon his return several months later that he found out that he was a father.

The Hardwick family moved to Atlanta, Georgia, when he was still a child and his father renamed him "Herbert Lewis Hardwick." Tragedy struck the family when his father and the rest of the crew of the USS Cyclops disappeared during World War I. The loss of the ship and 306 crew and passengers without a trace sometime after March 4, 1918, remains the single largest loss of life in U.S. Naval history not directly involving combat. The cause of the ship's loss is unknown. Hardwick was only three years old.

Shortly thereafter, upon the death of his mother, Hardwick went to live with his maternal aunt Antonia Arroyo-Robinson. Mrs. Arroyo-Robinson raised Hardwick and he came to identify more with his Puerto Rican heritage.

== Boxing career ==
Hardwick began to box in Atlanta when he was fourteen years old under the tutorship and management of Edward Allen Robinson (Antonia's husband). He fought for the first time as a professional at the age of fifteen, on May 27, 1929, at the Elks' Restaurant, in Atlanta, against a boxer who went under the name of "Kid Moon" and was victorious in that encounter.

In 1932, Connecticut State Senator Harry Durant was among those present at one of his fights in West Palm Beach. The Senator was impressed with Hardwick and sponsored his trip to New Haven where Hardwick began to fight under the name of the "Cocoa Kid." The name printed on his boxing license was that of "Louis Hardwick Arroyo." Hardwick used various names during his boxing career, besides using "Louis Arroyo," he would also fight under the name of "Louis Kid Cocoa". On April 4, 1932, he won his first fight in Connecticut, against a boxer named Joe Miller.

=== Black Murderers' Row ===
During his career in the late 1930s and early 1940s, Hardwick fought the top African-American fighters of the era in the Welterweight and Middleweight divisions. This group included, but was not limited to Charley Burley, Holman Williams, Jack Chase, Lloyd Marshall, Bert Lytell, Aaron Wade, and Eddie Booker. Hardwick fought Williams thirteen times, winning eight, losing three, and drawing in two.

The group came to be known as the "Black Murderers' Row" or Murderers' Row and was made up primarily of highly rated African-American boxing contenders in the 1940s, who competed around the Middleweight and Light Heavyweight divisions. Hardwick was the only Hispanic of African descent in the group. Renowned for their toughness and great boxing ability, they were feared throughout the boxing world and were the most avoided fighters of their generation. According to boxing pundit Jim Murray, the Murderers' Row was the most exclusive men's club the ring had ever known. They were so good and so feared that they had to have their own tournament. The term "murderers' row" was coined by writer Budd Schulberg, screenwriter of On the Waterfront.

Amongst the many boxers whom Hardwick fought and defeated during his career were Louis "Kid" Kaplan. The fight occurred on February 2, 1933, at the Arena in New Haven. Kaplan was a champion who held the World Featherweight title until 1927. On December 5, 1933, he faced Lou Ambers and lost the match.

On May 27, 1935, Hardwick decisively outpointed Frankie Britt over ten rounds to capture both the New England welterweight and middleweight titles on the same night.

From April through September 1940, Hardwick was the number one welterweight contender in the world. However Henry Armstrong, who held the World Welterweight Championship, refused to give him a title shot. On October 9, 1943, Hardwick made the cover of Knockout Magazine as "The Cocoa Kid."

=== World Colored Welterweight Championship ===
The World Colored Welterweight title was created in 1936. On July 26 of that year, Hardwick met Young Peter Jackson, the holder of the Pacific Coast and Mexican lightweight titles, at Heinemann Park in New Orleans, Louisiana in a 10-round title bout referred by Harry Wills, a three-time World Colored Heavyweight Champ. Hardwick won via a technical knock-out in the second round.

He made four defenses of the title. On September 22 of that year at the same venue, he defeated Jackie Elverillo on points in 10 rounds. On June 11, 1937, at the Coliseum Arena in New Orleans, Hardwick fought his old nemesis Holman Williams, prevailing in a close fight, winning a decision in the 12-rounder. Ring Magazine had donated a championship belt for the bout.

Hardwick successfully defended his title against Black Canadian boxer Sonny Jones at the Valley Arena in Holyoke, Massachusetts on November 15, 1937, in a bout refereed by then former world heavyweight champion Jack Sharkey. Hardwick scored a technical knock out in the sixth round of their 15-round bout. He had devastated Jones in the third with a right to his jaw and with a right opened a cut over Sonny's left eye. Sharkey stopped the fight when Jones could barely see.

The ascension of Henry Armstrong as the world welterweight champ on May 31, 1938 (when he beat Barney Ross) seemingly made the title redundant (the World Colored Heavyweight Championship expired when Joe Louis became world heavyweight champ in 1937 and the World Colored Middleweight Championship became defunct for 10 years after Gorilla Jones lost the world middleweight title in 1932), but continued to be contested during Armstrong's reign.

Hardwick lost the title to Charley Burley on August 22, 1938, at Hickey Park in Millvale, Pennsylvania. Burley won a unanimous decision in the 15-round bout, knocking Hardwick to the canvas three times and defeating him decisively, taking his title. Burley never defended the title, probably out of a desire to get a title shot with Armstrong. To fill the vacant title, Hardwick and Holman Williams met in a rematch on January 11, 1940, at the Coliseum in Baltimore, Maryland.

Hardwick won a unanimous decision in their 15-round title bout, winning the title for a second time. Hardwick never defended his second title.

=== World Colored Middleweight Championship ===
Hardwick faced Holman Williams for his World Colored Middleweight Championship on January 15, 1943, at the Victory Arena in New Orleans, Louisiana. Hardwick took the title from Williams on points in the 12-round bout.

He never defended the title, which became extinct. Instead, he met Williams at New Orleans' Coliseum Arena on September 15, 1944, for the "Duration Middleweight World Title". This time, the result was a draw after 12 rounds. It was his second fight after being discharged from the U.S. Navy.

=== The Hardwick – Billy Smith controversy ===
In 1944, a controversy erupted between Hardwick and a boxer named "Oakland Billy Smith." When the fighters met on November 24, in the Civic Auditorium of San Francisco, California, the betting odds favored the Cocoa Kid over Smith by 2 to 1. When Hardwick was knocked down four times, referee Frankie Brown became suspicious and stopped the fight, declaring it a "no-contest." During an investigation carried out by the California Boxing Commission, Hardwick claimed his poor performance was due to personal anxiety about his "sick mother" (meaning his aunt Antonia). According to the Oakland Tribune, the commission felt that Hardwick threw the fight. In addition to withholding his earnings, the commission fined him $500, and suspended him from boxing for six months.

=== End of his boxing career ===
On September 17, 1945, Hardwick fought and lost to Archie Moore. He lost his last professional fight on August 24, 1948, against Bobby Mann at Ball Park in Trenton, New Jersey. In 1949, Sugar Ray Robinson entered into, and then broke, two agreements to fight against Hardwick.

That same year of 1949, Hardwick was Robinson's sparring partner at the welterweight king's training camp in Pompton Lakes, New Jersey. Robinson was training for a fight with Steve Belloise and was at his peak. In one session, Hardwick landed a short overhand right to Robinson's chin and dropped him in the second round.

By the end of his boxing career, Hardwick had fought a total of 244 professional fights, of which he won 176 with 48 knockouts (KO). He lost 56 fights, 7 by way of KOs and 10 of his fights were classified as draws (ties). Among the Champions which he faced during his career were: Louis Kaplan, Johnny Jadick, Lou Ambers, Christopher "Battling" Battalino, Chalky Wright and Archie Moore. Of these he defeated Kaplan, Jadick and Wright in non-title fights.

== Later years ==
After retiring from the ring in 1950, Hardwick found himself homeless and penniless in Chicago. Marguerite Winrou, his wife, divorced him and gained the custody of their children. According to the Naval Record Management Center in St. Louis, Missouri, Hardwick had served in the United States Navy during World War II. He was honorably discharged after being diagnosed with pugilistic dementia by military doctors. He kept his diagnosis a secret during his days as a boxer in order to continue boxing.

Due to his long and difficult boxing career, Hardwick suffered from pugilistic dementia in his last years. In 1955, he wrote to the Navy asking for a copy of his discharge papers which he claimed were stolen with his Social Security card and was later admitted to the Veterans Administration Hospital in North Chicago. He died there on December 27, 1966, and is buried in Wood National Cemetery, section 36a, row 11, site 3, located in Milwaukee, Wisconsin. In 2011, Hardwick was inducted to the International Boxing Hall of Fame in 2012.

== Professional boxing record ==
249 fights	178 wins	58 losses
By knockout	48	7
By decision	130	50
By disqualification	0	1
Draws	11	
No contests	2	

No.	Result	Record	Opponent	Type	Round	Date	Location	Notes
249	Loss	178–58–11 (2)	Bobby Mann	PTS	8	Aug 24, 1948	Arena, Trenton, New Jersey, U.S.	
248	Win	178–57–11 (2)	Ray Barnes	KO	6 (10)	Dec 17, 1947	Coliseum Annex, Chicago, Illinois, U.S.	
247	Win	177–57–11 (2)	Julio Pedroso	PTS	10	Oct 12, 1947	Palacio de Deportes, Havana, Cuba	
246	Win	176–57–11 (2)	Jose Garcia Alvarez	KO	6 (10)	Oct 4, 1947	Palacio de Deportes, Havana, Cuba	
245	Loss	175–57–11 (2)	Jose Garcia Alvarez	DQ	2 (10)	Sep 30, 1947	Palacio de Deportes, Havana, Cuba	
244	Loss	175–56–11 (2)	William Poli	UD	8	Sep 2, 1947	MacArthur Stadium, Brooklyn, New York City, New York, U.S.	
243	Win	175–55–11 (2)	Ellis Stewart	UD	8	Aug 29, 1947	Open Air Arena, Leiperville, Pennsylvania, U.S.	
242	Loss	174–55–11 (2)	Pete Mead	MD	10	Jul 21, 1947	Coney Island Velodrome, Brooklyn, New York City, New York, U.S.	
241	Draw	174–54–11 (2)	Jerry Marshall	PTS	8	Jul 7, 1947	Queensboro Arena, Long Island City, Queens, New York City, New York, U.S.	
240	Loss	174–54–10 (2)	Bert Lytell	RTD	6 (10)	May 18, 1947	Coliseum Arena, New Orleans, Louisiana, U.S.	
239	Loss	174–53–10 (2)	Jimmy Sherrer	TKO	4 (10)	Apr 29, 1947	Auditorium, Milwaukee, Wisconsin, U.S.	
238	Win	174–52–10 (2)	Bobby Richardson	SD	10	Jan 31, 1947	Rainbo Arena, Chicago, Illinois, U.S.	
237	Win	173–52–10 (2)	Lloyd Gibson	PTS	6	Jan 27, 1947	Coliseum, Chicago, Illinois, U.S.	
236	Draw	172–52–10 (2)	O'Neill Bell	PTS	10	Jan 10, 1947	Rainbo Arena, Chicago, Illinois, U.S.	
235	Loss	172–52–9 (2)	Eddie O'Neill	PTS	8	Dec 27, 1946	Rainbo Arena, Chicago, Illinois, U.S.	
234	Win	172–51–9 (2)	Young Gene Buffalo	PTS	8	Dec 5, 1946	Rainbo Arena, Chicago, Illinois, U.S.	
233	Loss	171–51–9 (2)	Bert Lytell	PTS	10	Jul 30, 1946	Sixto Escobar Stadium, San Juan, Puerto Rico	
232	Win	171–50–9 (2)	Mario Raul Ochoa	PTS	10	Jul 16, 1946	Sixto Escobar Stadium, San Juan, Puerto Rico	
231	Win	170–50–9 (2)	Billy Morris	UD	10	Apr 4, 1946	Fayette Street Garden, Baltimore, Maryland, U.S.	
230	Loss	169–50–9 (2)	Bert Lytell	PTS	10	Mar 25, 1946	Valley Arena, Holyoke, Massachusetts, U.S.	
229	Win	169–49–9 (2)	Cecil Hudson	MD	10	Feb 7, 1946	Fayette Street Garden, Baltimore, Maryland, U.S.	
228	Loss	168–49–9 (2)	Archie Moore	KO	8 (10)	Sep 17, 1945	Coliseum, Baltimore, Maryland, U.S.	
227	Loss	168–48–9 (2)	George Henry	UD	10	Aug 20, 1945	Century Stadium, West Springfield, Massachusetts, U.S.	
226	Win	168–47–9 (2)	Joe Carter	SD	10	Jul 30, 1945	Coliseum, Baltimore, Maryland, U.S.	
225	Win	167–47–9 (2)	Joe Carter	SD	10	Jul 9, 1945	Century Stadium, West Springfield, Massachusetts, U.S.	
224	Win	166–47–9 (2)	Joe Hyman	PTS	10	May 23, 1945	Elizabeth, New Jersey, U.S.	
223	Loss	165–47–9 (2)	Holman Williams	UD	12	May 14, 1945	Coliseum, Baltimore, Maryland, U.S.	
222	Win	165–46–9 (2)	Joe Reddick	TKO	6 (8)	May 2, 1945	Armory, Paterson, New Jersey, U.S.	
221	Loss	164–46–9 (2)	Joe Carter	PTS	10	Apr 20, 1945	Pelican Stadium, New Orleans, Louisiana, U.S.	
220	Win	164–45–9 (2)	Holman Williams	SD	10	Mar 26, 1945	St. Nicholas Arena, New York City, New York, U.S.	
219	Loss	163–45–9 (2)	Johnny Carter	PTS	10	Mar 19, 1945	Laurel Garden, Newark, New Jersey, U.S.	
218	Win	163–44–9 (2)	Butch Lynch	PTS	10	Feb 15, 1945	Masonic Hall, Highland Park, New Jersey, U.S.	
217	Loss	162–44–9 (2)	Joe Carter	UD	10	Jan 29, 1945	Coliseum, Baltimore, Maryland, U.S.	
216	NC	162–43–9 (2)	Oakland Billy Smith	NC	3 (10)	Nov 24, 1944	Civic Auditorium, San Francisco, California, U.S.	Cocoa Kid was knocked down four times, but the referee declared it a no contest believing that he was faking
215	Loss	162–43–9 (1)	Aaron Wade	PTS	10	Nov 13, 1944	Civic Auditorium, San Francisco, California, U.S.	
214	Win	162–42–9 (1)	Jack Chase	UD	10	Oct 20, 1944	Legion Stadium, Hollywood, California, U.S.	
213	Draw	161–42–9 (1)	Holman Williams	PTS	12	Sep 15, 1944	Coliseum Arena, New Orleans, Louisiana, U.S.	For vacant duration middleweight title
212	Win	161–42–8 (1)	Billy Campanelli	TKO	1 (8)	Aug 24, 1944	Fort Hamilton Arena, Brooklyn, New York City, New York, U.S.	
211	Win	160–42–8 (1)	Jimmy McDaniels	UD	10	Oct 8, 1943	Legion Stadium, Hollywood, California, U.S.	
210	Win	159–42–8 (1)	Anthony Jones	PTS	10	Sep 24, 1943	Coliseum Arena, New Orleans, Louisiana, U.S.	
209	Win	158–42–8 (1)	Verne Patterson	TKO	7 (8)	Sep 9, 1943	Fort Hamilton Arena, Brooklyn, New York City, New York, U.S.	
208	Win	157–42–8 (1)	Phil Norman	PTS	10	Aug 30, 1943	Lido Sports Arena, New York City, New York, U.S.	
207	Loss	156–42–8 (1)	Joe Carter	PTS	10	Jul 12, 1943	Meadowbrook Bowl, Newark, New Jersey, U.S.	
206	Loss	156–41–8 (1)	George Kochan	SD	10	Jun 7, 1943	Coliseum, Baltimore, Maryland, U.S.	
205	Win	156–40–8 (1)	Pete DeRuzza	TKO	5 (8)	May 24, 1943	Convention Hall, Philadelphia, Pennsylvania, U.S.	
204	Win	155–40–8 (1)	Al Gilbert	TKO	2 (10)	May 17, 1943	Arcadia, Providence, Rhode Island, U.S.	
203	Win	154–40–8 (1)	Bob Jacobs	PTS	8	May 10, 1943	Arena, Philadelphia, Pennsylvania, U.S.	
202	Win	153–40–8 (1)	Deacon Johnny Brown	UD	15	May 3, 1943	Coliseum, Baltimore, Maryland, U.S.	
201	Draw	152–40–8 (1)	Charley Burley	PTS	10	Apr 19, 1943	Pelican Stadium, New Orleans, Louisiana, U.S.	
200	Win	152–40–7 (1)	Henry Robinson	PTS	8	Apr 9, 1943	Uline Arena, Washington, D.C., U.S.	
199	Loss	151–40–7 (1)	Earl Turner	PTS	10	Jan 25, 1943	Civic Auditorium, San Francisco, California, U.S.	
198	Win	151–39–7 (1)	Holman Williams	PTS	12	Jan 15, 1943	Victory Arena, New Orleans, Louisiana, U.S.	Won world colored middleweight title
197	Loss	150–39–7 (1)	California Jackie Wilson	SD	10	Dec 14, 1942	Coliseum, Baltimore, Maryland, U.S.	
196	Win	150–38–7 (1)	Syd Brown	PTS	10	Nov 8, 1942	Estadio Olimpico, Panama City, Panama	
195	Win	149–38–7 (1)	Dan Calcagno	PTS	10	Oct 25, 1942	Estadio Olimpico, Panama City, Panama	
194	Win	148–38–7 (1)	Fabio Hurtado	KO	4 (10)	Oct 11, 1942	Estadio Olimpico, Panama City, Panama	
193	Win	147–38–7 (1)	Johnny Jackson	UD	10	Aug 31, 1942	Coliseum, Baltimore, Maryland, U.S.	
192	Win	146–38–7 (1)	Saverio Turiello	UD	10	Aug 6, 1942	Century Stadium, West Springfield, Massachusetts, U.S.	
191	Win	145–38–7 (1)	Milo Theodorescu	PTS	8	Jul 24, 1942	Randolph-Clowes Stadium, Waterbury, Connecticut, U.S.	
190	Win	144–38–7 (1)	Pete DeRuzza	PTS	10	Jun 19, 1942	White City Stadium, West Haven, Connecticut, U.S.	
189	Win	143–38–7 (1)	Joe Legon	PTS	10	May 2, 1942	Arena Cristal, Havana, Cuba	
188	Win	142–38–7 (1)	Bobby Britton	TKO	6 (10)	Apr 13, 1942	Coliseum, Baltimore, Maryland, U.S.	
187	Win	141–38–7 (1)	Holman Williams	PTS	6	Mar 27, 1942	Madison Square Garden, New York City, New York, U.S.	
186	Win	140–38–7 (1)	Holman Williams	UD	15	Mar 2, 1942	Coliseum, Baltimore, Maryland, U.S.	
185	Win	139–38–7 (1)	Felix Morales	PTS	8	Feb 26, 1942	Waltz Dream Arena, Atlantic City, New Jersey, U.S.	
184	Loss	138–38–7 (1)	Holman Williams	UD	12	Jan 19, 1942	Coliseum, Baltimore, Maryland, U.S.	
183	Win	138–37–7 (1)	Eddie Dolan	TKO	3 (10)	Jan 14, 1942	Arena, New Haven, Connecticut, U.S.	Won vacant Connecticut welterweight title
182	Draw	137–37–7 (1)	Holman Williams	SD	10	Dec 22, 1941	Coliseum, Baltimore, Maryland, U.S.	
181	Win	137–37–6 (1)	Slugger White	UD	15	Dec 8, 1941	Coliseum, Baltimore, Maryland, U.S.	
180	Win	136–37–6 (1)	Pedro Tomez	KO	4 (8)	Nov 17, 1941	Ridgewood Grove, Brooklyn, New York City, New York, U.S.	
179	Win	135–37–6 (1)	Freddie Camuso	PTS	10	Nov 13, 1941	Casino, Fall River, Massachusetts, U.S.	
178	Win	134–37–6 (1)	Bobby Britton	PTS	10	Oct 1, 1941	Laurel Garden, Newark, New Jersey, U.S.	
177	Win	133–37–6 (1)	Vinnie Vines	PTS	10	Sep 8, 1941	Meadowbrook Bowl, Newark, New Jersey, U.S.	
176	Loss	132–37–6 (1)	Izzy Jannazzo	PTS	10	Aug 5, 1941	Ebbets Field, Brooklyn, New York City, New York, U.S.	
175	Win	132–36–6 (1)	Manuel Villa II	KO	4 (8)	Jun 10, 1941	Queensboro Arena, Long Island City, Queens, New York City, New York, U.S.	
174	Win	131–36–6 (1)	Norman Rubio	PTS	10	Jun 2, 1941	Meadowbrook Bowl, Newark, New Jersey, U.S.	
173	Win	130–36–6 (1)	Phil Furr	UD	10	May 13, 1941	Convention Hall, Philadelphia, Pennsylvania, U.S.	
172	Win	129–36–6 (1)	Joe Sutka	KO	10 (10)	Apr 21, 1941	Turner's Arena, Washington, D.C., U.S.	
171	Win	128–36–6 (1)	Jerry Fiorello	PTS	8	Apr 15, 1941	Broadway Arena, Brooklyn, New York City, New York, U.S.	
170	Win	127–36–6 (1)	Andre Jessurun	UD	10	Mar 31, 1941	Turner's Arena, Washington, D.C., U.S.	
169	Win	126–36–6 (1)	Tony Cisco	UD	10	Mar 17, 1941	Coliseum, Baltimore, Maryland, U.S.	
168	NC	125–36–6 (1)	Kid Azteca	NC	10 (10)	Jan 11, 1941	Arena Nacional, Mexico City, Distrito Federal, Mexico	
167	Loss	125–36–6	Kid Azteca	PTS	10	Jan 1, 1941	Arena Nacional, Mexico City, Distrito Federal, Mexico	
166	Loss	125–35–6	Jimmy Leto	KO	3 (10)	Nov 11, 1940	Carlin's Park, Baltimore, Maryland, U.S.	
165	Loss	125–34–6	Izzy Jannazzo	SD	15	Oct 14, 1940	Carlin's Park, Baltimore, Maryland, U.S.	For vacant Maryland world welterweight title
164	Loss	125–33–6	Georgie Abrams	SD	10	Aug 12, 1940	Griffith Stadium, Washington, D.C., U.S.	
163	Win	125–32–6	Phil Furr	UD	10	Jul 15, 1940	Griffith Stadium, Washington, D.C., U.S.	
162	Win	124–32–6	Jimmy Leto	UD	10	Jul 8, 1940	Carlin's Park, Baltimore, Maryland, U.S.	
161	Win	123–32–6	Frankie Britt	TKO	7 (12)	Jul 1, 1940	Donovan Field, West Haven, Connecticut, U.S.	Won USA New England welterweight title
160	Win	122–32–6	Bill McDowell	UD	10	Jun 19, 1940	Griffith Stadium, Washington, D.C., U.S.	
159	Win	121–32–6	Johnny Barbara	TKO	1 (10)	Jun 13, 1940	Arena, Philadelphia, Pennsylvania, U.S.	
158	Win	120–32–6	Billy White	KO	2 (12)	May 27, 1940	Carlin's Park, Baltimore, Maryland, U.S.	
157	Win	119–32–6	Chalky Wright	MD	10	Apr 29, 1940	Carlin's Park, Baltimore, Maryland, U.S.	
156	Win	118–32–6	Billy White	TKO	9 (12)	Mar 25, 1940	Carlin's Park, Baltimore, Maryland, U.S.	
155	Win	117–32–6	Tony Martin	UD	10	Feb 19, 1940	Carlin's Park, Baltimore, Maryland, U.S.	
154	Win	116–32–6	Holman Williams	UD	15	Jan 11, 1940	Coliseum, Baltimore, Maryland, U.S.	Won vacant world colored welterweight title
153	Win	115–32–6	Tommy Bland	PTS	10	Dec 7, 1939	Coliseum, Baltimore, Maryland, U.S.	
152	Win	114–32–6	Mike DeStefano	PTS	10	Dec 1, 1939	Cambria A.C., Philadelphia, Pennsylvania, U.S.	
151	Win	113–32–6	Carl Dell	SD	10	Oct 16, 1939	Valley Arena, Holyoke, Massachusetts, U.S.	
150	Win	112–32–6	Kenny LaSalle	PTS	10	Oct 9, 1939	Carlin's Park, Baltimore, Maryland, U.S.	
149	Win	111–32–6	Wicky Harkins	MD	8	Oct 2, 1939	Maple Grove Field House, Lancaster, Pennsylvania, U.S.	
148	Win	110–32–6	Buster Carroll	UD	10	Aug 3, 1939	Coliseum, Baltimore, Maryland, U.S.	
147	Win	109–32–6	Steve Mamakos	UD	10	Jul 20, 1939	Coliseum, Baltimore, Maryland, U.S.	
146	Loss	108–32–6	Tony Martin	PTS	10	Jul 3, 1939	Laurel Garden, Newark, New Jersey, U.S.	
145	Win	108–31–6	Bobby Masters	TKO	3 (10)	Jun 15, 1939	Coliseum, Baltimore, Maryland, U.S.	
144	Loss	107–31–6	Mike Kaplan	SD	10	May 12, 1939	Boston Garden, Boston, Massachusetts, U.S.	
143	Win	107–30–6	Sigi Lander	RTD	1 (10)	Mar 30, 1939	Casino, Fall River, Massachusetts, U.S.	
142	Draw	106–30–6	Mike Kaplan	PTS	10	Mar 24, 1939	Arena, Boston, Massachusetts, U.S.	
141	Win	106–30–5	Eddie Booker	PTS	10	Mar 9, 1939	Arena, New Haven, Connecticut, U.S.	
140	Win	105–30–5	Freddie Camuso	UD	10	Feb 22, 1939	Bristol Arena, New Bedford, Massachusetts, U.S.	
139	Win	104–30–5	Buster Carroll	PTS	10	Feb 16, 1939	Mechanics Building, Boston, Massachusetts, U.S.	
138	Loss	103–30–5	Frankie Britt	SD	12	Jan 26, 1939	Casino, Fall River, Massachusetts, U.S.	Lost USA New England welterweight title
137	Win	103–29–5	Eddie Cerda	PTS	10	Oct 1, 1938	Rockland Palace, New York City, New York, U.S.	
136	Win	102–29–5	George Martin	UD	15	Sep 9, 1938	Boston Garden, Boston, Massachusetts, U.S.	Retained USA New England welterweight title
135	Win	101–29–5	Howell King	PTS	10	Aug 31, 1938	Naval Armory, Detroit, Michigan, U.S.	
134	Loss	100–29–5	Charley Burley	UD	15	Aug 22, 1938	Hickey Park, Millvale, Pennsylvania, U.S.	Lost world colored welterweight title
133	Loss	100–28–5	Johnny Jackson	TKO	10 (10)	Aug 4, 1938	City Park Baseball Field, Baton Rouge, Louisiana, U.S.	
132	Win	100–27–5	Tommy Bland	PTS	10	Jul 16, 1938	Walnut Beach Stadium, Milford, Connecticut, U.S.	
131	Loss	99–27–5	Paulie Walker	SD	10	May 2, 1938	Carlin's Park, Baltimore, Maryland, U.S.	
130	Win	99–26–5	Vince De Angelo	PTS	10	Feb 28, 1938	Providence, Rhode Island, U.S.	
129	Win	98–26–5	Gordon Wallace	UD	10	Feb 21, 1938	Valley Arena, Holyoke, Massachusetts, U.S.	
128	Loss	97–26–5	Michele Palermo	UD	10	Jan 31, 1938	Valley Arena, Holyoke, Massachusetts, U.S.	
127	Win	97–25–5	Teddy Loder	SD	10	Dec 6, 1937	Valley Arena, Holyoke, Massachusetts, U.S.	
126	Win	96–25–5	Sonny Jones	TKO	6 (15)	Nov 15, 1937	Valley Arena, Holyoke, Massachusetts, U.S.	Retained world colored welterweight title
125	Loss	95–25–5	Saverio Turiello	UD	10	Sep 20, 1937	Carlin's Park, Baltimore, Maryland, U.S.	
124	Loss	95–24–5	Saverio Turiello	UD	10	Aug 16, 1937	Carlin's Park, Baltimore, Maryland, U.S.	
123	Win	95–23–5	Johnny Lucas	TKO	8 (15)	Jul 26, 1937	Carlin's Park, Baltimore, Maryland, U.S.	
122	Win	94–23–5	Willie Eley	PTS	10	Jul 17, 1937	Walnut Beach Stadium, Milford, Connecticut, U.S.	
121	Win	93–23–5	Werther Arcelli	KO	2 (10)	Jul 12, 1937	Carlin's Park, Baltimore, Maryland, U.S.	
120	Win	92–23–5	Holman Williams	PTS	15	Jun 11, 1937	Coliseum Arena, New Orleans, Louisiana, U.S.	Retained world colored welterweight title
119	Loss	91–23–5	Johnny Lucas	SD	12	Jun 7, 1937	Carlin's Park, Baltimore, Maryland, U.S.	
118	Win	91–22–5	Johnny Lucas	SD	12	May 3, 1937	Carlin's Park, Baltimore, Maryland, U.S.	
117	Win	90–22–5	Andre Jessurun	KO	11 (12)	Apr 5, 1937	Carlin's Park, Baltimore, Maryland, U.S.	
116	Win	89–22–5	Tommy Jones	PTS	10	Mar 22, 1937	Coliseum Arena, New Orleans, Louisiana, U.S.	
115	Loss	88–22–5	Holman Williams	PTS	12	Mar 12, 1937	Coliseum Arena, New Orleans, Louisiana, U.S.	
114	Win	88–21–5	Jack Portney	TKO	12 (15)	Mar 1, 1937	Carlin's Park, Baltimore, Maryland, U.S.	
113	Win	87–21–5	Paulie Walker	PTS	8	Dec 16, 1936	Hippodrome, New York City, New York, U.S.	
112	Win	86–21–5	Casper LaRosa	UD	10	Nov 30, 1936	Valley Arena, Holyoke, Massachusetts, U.S.	
111	Win	85–21–5	Jack Portney	SD	10	Nov 9, 1936	Carlin's Park, Baltimore, Maryland, U.S.	
110	Win	84–21–5	Bobby Orr	TKO	4 (10)	Oct 14, 1936	Arena, New Haven, Connecticut, U.S.	
109	Win	83–21–5	Jackie Elverrillo	PTS	10	Sep 22, 1936	Heinemann Park, New Orleans, Louisiana, U.S.	Retained world colored welterweight title
108	Win	82–21–5	Jack Portney	PTS	10	Aug 7, 1936	Newfield Park, Bridgeport, Connecticut, U.S.	
107	Win	81–21–5	Young Peter Jackson	TKO	2 (10)	Jul 26, 1936	Heinemann Park, New Orleans, Louisiana, U.S.	Won vacant world colored welterweight title
106	Win	80–21–5	Vince De Angelo	PTS	10	Jun 29, 1936	Valley Arena, Holyoke, Massachusetts, U.S.	
105	Win	79–21–5	Werther Arcelli	PTS	12	Jun 19, 1936	Meadowbrook Arena, North Adams, Massachusetts, U.S.	Retained USA New England welterweight title
104	Loss	78–21–5	Andre Jessurun	UD	10	Jun 1, 1936	Valley Arena, Holyoke, Massachusetts, U.S.	
103	Win	78–20–5	Holman Williams	PTS	10	Apr 17, 1936	Coliseum Arena, New Orleans, Louisiana, U.S.	
102	Win	77–20–5	Werther Arcelli	PTS	10	Apr 2, 1936	Arena, New Haven, Connecticut, U.S.	
101	Win	76–20–5	Holman Williams	MD	10	Mar 13, 1936	Coliseum Arena, New Orleans, Louisiana, U.S.	
100	Win	75–20–5	Darcey White	PTS	10	Feb 28, 1936	Coliseum Arena, New Orleans, Louisiana, U.S.	
99	Win	74–20–5	Wesley Farrell	PTS	10	Feb 21, 1936	Coliseum Arena, New Orleans, Louisiana, U.S.	
98	Win	73–20–5	Tiger Joe Randall	PTS	10	Jan 31, 1936	Coliseum Arena, New Orleans, Louisiana, U.S.	
97	Win	72–20–5	Joe Pennino	PTS	10	Jan 6, 1936	Valley Arena, Holyoke, Massachusetts, U.S.	
96	Win	71–20–5	Frankie Cinque	SD	10	Dec 9, 1935	Valley Arena, Holyoke, Massachusetts, U.S.	
95	Loss	70–20–5	Andre Jessurun	UD	10	Nov 25, 1935	Valley Arena, Holyoke, Massachusetts, U.S.	
94	Win	70–19–5	Tommy Mollis	PTS	10	Nov 14, 1935	New Albert Hall, Baltimore, Maryland, U.S.	
93	Draw	69–19–5	Harvey Massey	SD	10	Nov 1, 1935	Coliseum Arena, New Orleans, Louisiana, U.S.	
92	Win	69–19–4	Wesley Farrell	PTS	10	Oct 18, 1935	Coliseum Arena, New Orleans, Louisiana, U.S.	
91	Win	68–19–4	Andy Callahan	TKO	10 (12)	Sep 9, 1935	Valley Arena, Holyoke, Massachusetts, U.S.	Retained USA New England welterweight title
90	Win	67–19–4	Casper LaRosa	PTS	8	Aug 31, 1935	Walnut Beach Stadium, Milford, Connecticut, U.S.	
89	Win	66–19–4	Davey Grande	UD	10	Aug 1, 1935	Meadowbrook Arena, North Adams, Massachusetts, U.S.	
88	Win	65–19–4	Paul Canamare	PTS	8	Jul 12, 1935	Walnut Beach Stadium, Milford, Connecticut, U.S.	
87	Win	64–19–4	Harry Carlton	PTS	10	Jun 28, 1935	Arena, New Haven, Connecticut, U.S.	
86	Win	63–19–4	Werther Arcelli	UD	10	Jun 13, 1935	Boston Garden, Boston, Massachusetts, U.S.	
85	Win	62–19–4	Frankie Britt	PTS	10	May 27, 1935	Arena, Boston, Massachusetts, U.S.	Won USA New England welterweight title; Won vacant USA New England middleweight title
84	Win	61–19–4	Johnny Graycar	TKO	4 (10)	May 13, 1935	Valley Arena, Holyoke, Massachusetts, U.S.	
83	Loss	60–19–4	Jimmy Leto	PTS	10	Apr 26, 1935	Arena, New Haven, Connecticut, U.S.	
82	Win	60–18–4	Ray Napolitano	UD	8	Mar 22, 1935	Boston Garden, Boston, Massachusetts, U.S.	
81	Win	59–18–4	Ray Napolitano	PTS	8	Feb 28, 1935	Arena, New Haven, Connecticut, U.S.	
80	Loss	58–18–4	Kid Azteca	PTS	10	Jan 26, 1935	Arena Nacional, Mexico City, Distrito Federal, Mexico	
79	Draw	58–17–4	Kid Azteca	PTS	10	Jan 19, 1935	Arena Nacional, Mexico City, Distrito Federal, Mexico	
78	Win	58–17–3	Elmer Bezenah	PTS	6	Dec 3, 1934	Arena, New Haven, Connecticut, U.S.	
77	Win	57–17–3	Petey Mike	PTS	10	Nov 22, 1934	Kanter's Auditorium, Passaic, New Jersey, U.S.	
76	Loss	56–17–3	Christopher Battalino	RTD	6 (10)	Oct 23, 1934	Foot Guard Hall, Hartford, Connecticut, U.S.	
75	Loss	56–16–3	Michele Palermo	PTS	10	Sep 27, 1934	Arena, New Haven, Connecticut, U.S.	
74	Win	56–15–3	Carmen Roman	PTS	10	Aug 21, 1934	St. Michael's Arena, Pawcatuck, Connecticut, U.S.	
73	Loss	55–15–3	Frankie Britt	PTS	10	Aug 16, 1934	Casino, Fall River, Massachusetts, U.S.	
72	Win	55–14–3	Gaston LeCadre	SD	8	Aug 6, 1934	Heywood Arena, West Springfield, Massachusetts, U.S.	
71	Win	54–14–3	Morrie Sherman	PTS	6	Jul 17, 1934	Coney Island Velodrome, Brooklyn, New York City, New York, U.S.	
70	Win	53–14–3	Steve Halaiko	PTS	8	Jul 9, 1934	Heywood Arena, West Springfield, Massachusetts, U.S.	
69	Win	52–14–3	Danny Devlin	UD	10	Jun 18, 1934	Heywood Arena, West Springfield, Massachusetts, U.S.	
68	Win	51–14–3	Steve Halaiko	UD	10	Jun 11, 1934	Heywood Arena, West Springfield, Massachusetts, U.S.	
67	Win	50–14–3	Billy Bridges	TKO	4 (8)	Jun 7, 1934	Arena, New Haven, Connecticut, U.S.	
66	Win	49–14–3	Eddie Holmes	UD	10	May 28, 1934	Valley Arena, Holyoke, Massachusetts, U.S.	
65	Win	48–14–3	Frankie Bruno	PTS	6	May 26, 1934	Ridgewood Grove, Brooklyn, New York City, New York, U.S.	
64	Win	47–14–3	Johnny Lucas	PTS	10	Apr 30, 1934	Valley Arena, Holyoke, Massachusetts, U.S.	
63	Win	46–14–3	Sailor Randall	PTS	10	Apr 20, 1934	Greenwich, Connecticut, U.S.	
62	Win	45–14–3	Andy DiVodi	PTS	10	Apr 12, 1934	Providence, Rhode Island, U.S.	
61	Loss	44–14–3	Joey Ferrando	PTS	10	Apr 9, 1934	Oakland Arena, Jersey City, New Jersey, U.S.	
60	Win	44–13–3	Pancho Villa	SD	10	Mar 16, 1934	Mechanics Hall, Worcester, Massachusetts, U.S.	
59	Win	43–13–3	Joey Bazzone	PTS	10	Feb 26, 1934	Palisades Rink, McKeesport, Pennsylvania, U.S.	
58	Loss	42–13–3	Ray Napolitano	SD	6	Feb 24, 1934	Ridgewood Grove, Brooklyn, New York City, New York, U.S.	
57	Win	42–12–3	Tony Catalano	TKO	2 (8)	Feb 15, 1934	Arena, New Haven, Connecticut, U.S.	
56	Win	41–12–3	Eddie Marks	TKO	3 (8)	Feb 8, 1934	Arena, New Haven, Connecticut, U.S.	
55	Loss	40–12–3	Jackie Davis	PTS	8	Jan 18, 1934	Arena, New Haven, Connecticut, U.S.	
54	Win	40–11–3	Joey Bazzone	PTS	10	Jan 7, 1934	Johnstown, Pennsylvania, U.S.	
53	Loss	39–11–3	Lou Ambers	PTS	10	Dec 5, 1933	Rhode Island Auditorium, Providence, Rhode Island, U.S.	
52	Draw	39–10–3	Joe Ghnouly	PTS	6	Nov 24, 1933	Madison Square Garden, New York City, New York, U.S.	
51	Win	39–10–2	Victor Lotti	TKO	3 (10)	Sep 26, 1933	Arena, New Haven, Connecticut, U.S.	
50	Loss	38–10–2	Wesley Ramey	UD	10	Aug 31, 1933	Heywood Arena, West Springfield, Massachusetts, U.S.	
49	Win	38–9–2	Eddie Shapiro	PTS	10	Aug 26, 1933	Walnut Beach Stadium, Milford, Connecticut, U.S.	
48	Win	37–9–2	Young Joe Firpo	PTS	10	Aug 14, 1933	Oakland Arena, Jersey City, New Jersey, U.S.	
47	Loss	36–9–2	Steve Halaiko	PTS	10	Jul 31, 1933	White City Stadium, West Haven, Connecticut, U.S.	
46	Win	36–8–2	Paolo Villa	KO	3 (8)	Jul 22, 1933	Walnut Beach Stadium, Milford, Connecticut, U.S.	
45	Win	35–8–2	George Goldberg	TKO	4 (10)	Jul 13, 1933	Meadowbrook Arena, North Adams, Massachusetts, U.S.	
44	Win	34–8–2	Jimmy O'Brien	TKO	6 (10)	Jul 8, 1933	Walnut Beach Stadium, Milford, Connecticut, U.S.	
43	Loss	33–8–2	Steve Halaiko	UD	10	Jun 19, 1933	Heywood Arena, West Springfield, Massachusetts, U.S.	
42	Win	33–7–2	Eddie Conley	TKO	5 (10)	Jun 9, 1933	Arena, New Haven, Connecticut, U.S.	
41	Win	32–7–2	Frankie Carlton	KO	2 (10)	May 22, 1933	Valley Arena, Holyoke, Massachusetts, U.S.	
40	Loss	31–7–2	Jimmy Leto	UD	10	May 8, 1933	Valley Arena, Holyoke, Massachusetts, U.S.	
39	Win	31–6–2	Johnny Jadick	PTS	10	Apr 17, 1933	Arena, New Haven, Connecticut, U.S.	
38	Loss	30–6–2	Billy Bridges	PTS	10	Apr 7, 1933	Columbus Hall, Stamford, Connecticut, U.S.	
37	Win	30–5–2	Lou Saunders	TKO	2 (10)	Mar 28, 1933	Columbus Hall, Stamford, Connecticut, U.S.	
36	Win	29–5–2	Miki Gelb	TKO	8 (10)	Mar 20, 1933	Arena, New Haven, Connecticut, U.S.	
35	Win	28–5–2	Louis Kid Kaplan	PTS	10	Feb 20, 1933	Arena, New Haven, Connecticut, U.S.	
34	Loss	27–5–2	Harry Carlton	PTS	10	Feb 2, 1933	Arena, New Haven, Connecticut, U.S.	
33	Win	27–4–2	Pancho Villa	PTS	10	Jan 12, 1933	Arena, New Haven, Connecticut, U.S.	
32	Win	26–4–2	Harry Alexanian	PTS	8	Dec 15, 1932	Arena, New Haven, Connecticut, U.S.	
31	Win	25–4–2	Patsy Rubinetti	PTS	8	Dec 2, 1932	Arena, New Haven, Connecticut, U.S.	
30	Win	24–4–2	Eddie Conley	PTS	6	Nov 17, 1932	Arena, New Haven, Connecticut, U.S.	
29	Win	23–4–2	Mickey Paul	TKO	3 (8)	Nov 14, 1932	St. Nicholas Arena, New York City, New York, U.S.	
28	Win	22–4–2	Baby Bear	KO	2 (5)	Oct 24, 1932	Arena, New Haven, Connecticut, U.S.	
27	Win	21–4–2	Abe Schulman	PTS	8	Sep 19, 1932	Valley Arena, Holyoke, Massachusetts, U.S.	
26	Win	20–4–2	Tommy Jarrett	PTS	5	Sep 1, 1932	White City Stadium, West Haven, Connecticut, U.S.	
25	Loss	19–4–2	Pete Herman	KO	3 (6)	Aug 2, 1932	Fenway Park, Boston, Massachusetts, U.S.	
24	Win	19–3–2	Pete Herman	PTS	6	Jul 26, 1932	Fenway Park, Boston, Massachusetts, U.S.	
23	Win	18–3–2	Baby Jack Renault	PTS	10	Jul 21, 1932	Meadowbrook Arena, North Adams, Massachusetts, U.S.	
22	Win	17–3–2	Rene Peloquin	TKO	6 (8)	Jun 29, 1932	Hurley Stadium, East Hartford, Connecticut, U.S.	
21	Win	16–3–2	Tommy Jarrett	KO	5 (10)	Jun 23, 1932	Thames Arena, New London, Connecticut, U.S.	
20	Loss	15–3–2	Harry Alexanian	PTS	8	Jun 14, 1932	Armory, Willimantic, Connecticut, U.S.	
19	Win	15–2–2	Wildman Firpo	PTS	6	Jun 3, 1932	Thames Arena, New London, Connecticut, U.S.	
18	Win	14–2–2	Al Gauthier	PTS	6	May 20, 1932	Thames Arena, New London, Connecticut, U.S.	
17	Win	13–2–2	Walter Sharp	TKO	3 (6)	Apr 29, 1932	Arena, New Haven, Connecticut, U.S.	
16	Win	12–2–2	Joe Miller	PTS	6	Apr 15, 1932	Red Men's Hall, Bridgeport, Connecticut, U.S.	
15	Loss	11–2–2	Kid LaGula	PTS	8	Feb 9, 1932	Miami, Florida, U.S.	
14	Win	11–1–2	Young Harry Wills	TKO	2 (10)	Feb 5, 1932	Auditorium, Atlanta, Georgia, U.S.	
13	Win	10–1–2	Battling McCoy	KO	10 (10)	Dec 10, 1931	Atlanta, Georgia, U.S.	
12	Win	9–1–2	Kid LaGula	PTS	10	Sep 9, 1931	Roby's Arena, Atlanta, Georgia, U.S.	
11	Win	8–1–2	Kid Tiller	PTS	?	Aug 31, 1931	Roby's Arena, Atlanta, Georgia, U.S.	
10	Draw	7–1–2	Cowboy Kid	PTS	10	Apr 24, 1931	Municipal Auditorium, Atlanta, Georgia, U.S.	
9	Win	7–1–1	Patent Leather Kid	PTS	10	Oct 12, 1930	Probably in Florida, U.S.	Exact date and location unknown
8	Loss	6–1–1	Gus De Sagon	PTS	10	Oct 5, 1930	Riverside Stadium, Mayaguez, Puerto Rico	
7	Win	6–0–1	Ramon Bordelies	PTS	8	Sep 17, 1930	Probably in Puerto Rico	Exact date and location unknown
6	Win	5–0–1	Pedro Benitez	PTS	10	Aug 31, 1930	Riverside Stadium, Mayaguez, Puerto Rico	
5	Draw	4–0–1	Baby Bear	PTS	6	Jun 17, 1930	Municipal Auditorium, Atlanta, Georgia, U.S.	
4	Win	4–0	Battling Sells	PTS	?	May 23, 1930	81 Theatre, Atlanta, Georgia, U.S.	
3	Win	3–0	Dynamite Adams	PTS	6	Apr 28, 1930	Municipal Auditorium, Macon, Georgia, U.S.	
2	Win	2–0	B W Jackson	KO	3 (6)	Jun 21, 1929	Elks' Rest, Atlanta, Georgia, U.S.	
1	Win	1–0	Kid Moon	PTS	8	May 27, 1929	Elks' Rest, Atlanta, Georgia, U.S.	

Puerto Ricans in the International Boxing Hall of Fame

Number	Name	Year inducted	Notes
1	Carlos Ortíz	1991	World Jr. Welterweight Champion 1959 June 12- 1960, September 1, WBA Lightweight Champion 1962 Apr 21 – 1965 Apr 10, WBC Lightweight Champion 1963 Apr 7 – 1965 Apr 10, WBC Lightweight Champion 1965 Nov 13 – 1968 Jun 29.
2	Wilfred Benítez	1994	The youngest world champion in boxing history. WBA Light Welterweight Champion 1976 Mar 6 – 1977, WBC Welterweight Champion 1979 Jan 14 – 1979 Nov 30, WBC Light Middleweight Champion.
3	Wilfredo Gómez	1995	WBC Super Bantamweight Champion 1977 May 21 – 1983, WBC Featherweight Champion 1984 Mar 31 – 1984 Dec 8, WBA Super Featherweight Champion 1985 May 19 – 1986 May 24.
4	José "Chegui" Torres	1997	Won a silver medal in the junior middleweight at the 1956 Olympic Games. Undisputed Light Heavyweight Champion 1965 Mar 30 – 1966 Dec 16
5	Sixto Escobar	2002	Puerto Rico's first boxing champion. World Bantamweight Champion 15 Nov 1935– 23 Sep 1937, World Bantamweight Champion 20 Feb 1938– Oct 1939
6	Edwin Rosario	2006	Ranks #36 on the list of "100 Greatest Punchers of All Time." according to Ring Magazine. WBC Lightweight Champion 1983 May 1 – 1984 Nov 3, WBA Lightweight Champion 1986 Sep 26 – 1987 Nov 21, WBA Lightweight Champion 199 Jul 9 – 1990 Apr 4, WBA Light Welterweight Champion 1991 Jun 14 – 1992 Apr 10.
7	Pedro Montañez	2007	92 wins out of 103 fights. Never held a title.
8	Joe Cortez	2011	The first Puerto Rican boxing referee to be inducted into the Boxing Hall of Fame
9	Herbert "Cocoa Kid" Hardwick	2012	Member of boxing's "Black Murderers' Row". World Colored Welterweight Championship - June 11, 1937 to August 22, 1938; World Colored Middleweight Championship - January 11, 1940 until the title went extinct in the 1940s; World Colored Middleweight Championship - January 15, 1943 until the title went extinct in the 1940s
10	Félix "Tito" Trinidad	2014	Captured the IBF welterweight crown in his 20th pro bout. Won the WBA light middleweight title from David Reid in March 2000 and later that year unified titles with a 12th-round knockout against IBF champ Fernando Vargas. In 2001 became a three-division champion.
11	Héctor "Macho" Camacho	2016	First boxer to be recognized as a septuple champion in history (counting championships from minor sanctioning bodies). WBC Super Featherweight Championship - August 7, 1983 – 1984, WBC Lightweight Championship - August 10, 1985 – 1987, WBO Light Welterweight Champion - March 6, 1989 – February 23, 1991, WBO Light Welterweight Champion - May 18, 1991–1992.
12	Mario Rivera Martino	2019	First Puerto Rican boxing sports writer to be inducted into the International Boxing Hall of Fame. He served Puerto Rican boxing for more than 50 years as a writer and eventual commissioner.
13	Miguel Cotto	2022	He is a multiple-time world champion, and the first Puerto Rican boxer to win world titles in four weight classes, from light welterweight to middleweight. In 2007 and 2009,

= Indicates the person is no longer alive

== See also ==
- List of Puerto Ricans
- Sports in Puerto Rico
- African immigration to Puerto Rico
- List of Puerto Rican boxing world champions

== Notes ==
Sporting positions
Preceded by New Title	World Colored Welterweight Championship; June 11, 1937 – August 22, 1938	Succeeded by Charley Burley
Preceded by Charley Burley; Vacated title	World Colored Welterweight Championship; January 11, 1940 – Unknown	Succeeded by Title defunct
Preceded by Holman Williams	World Colored Middleweight Championship; January 15, 1943 – Unknown	Succeeded by Title defunct

Puerto Ricans in the International Boxing Hall of Fame

Number	Name	Year inducted	Notes
1	Carlos Ortíz	1991	World Jr. Welterweight Champion 1959 June 12- 1960, September 1, WBA Lightweight Champion 1962 Apr 21 – 1965 Apr 10, WBC Lightweight Champion 1963 Apr 7 – 1965 Apr 10, WBC Lightweight Champion 1965 Nov 13 – 1968 Jun 29.
2	Wilfred Benítez	1994	The youngest world champion in boxing history. WBA Light Welterweight Champion 1976 Mar 6 – 1977, WBC Welterweight Champion 1979 Jan 14 – 1979 Nov 30, WBC Light Middleweight Champion.
3	Wilfredo Gómez	1995	WBC Super Bantamweight Champion 1977 May 21 – 1983, WBC Featherweight Champion 1984 Mar 31 – 1984 Dec 8, WBA Super Featherweight Champion 1985 May 19 – 1986 May 24.
4	José "Chegui" Torres	1997	Won a silver medal in the junior middleweight at the 1956 Olympic Games. Undisputed Light Heavyweight Champion 1965 Mar 30 – 1966 Dec 16
5	Sixto Escobar	2002	Puerto Rico's first boxing champion. World Bantamweight Champion 15 Nov 1935– 23 Sep 1937, World Bantamweight Champion 20 Feb 1938– Oct 1939
6	Edwin Rosario	2006	Ranks #36 on the list of "100 Greatest Punchers of All Time." according to Ring Magazine. WBC Lightweight Champion 1983 May 1 – 1984 Nov 3, WBA Lightweight Champion 1986 Sep 26 – 1987 Nov 21, WBA Lightweight Champion 199 Jul 9 – 1990 Apr 4, WBA Light Welterweight Champion 1991 Jun 14 – 1992 Apr 10.
7	Pedro Montañez	2007	92 wins out of 103 fights. Never held a title.
8	Joe Cortez	2011	The first Puerto Rican boxing referee to be inducted into the Boxing Hall of Fame
9	Herbert "Cocoa Kid" Hardwick	2012	Member of boxing's "Black Murderers' Row". World Colored Welterweight Championship - June 11, 1937 to August 22, 1938; World Colored Middleweight Championship - January 11, 1940 until the title went extinct in the 1940s; World Colored Middleweight Championship - January 15, 1943 until the title went extinct in the 1940s
10	Félix "Tito" Trinidad	2014	Captured the IBF welterweight crown in his 20th pro bout. Won the WBA light middleweight title from David Reid in March 2000 and later that year unified titles with a 12th-round knockout against IBF champ Fernando Vargas. In 2001 became a three-division champion.
11	Héctor "Macho" Camacho	2016	First boxer to be recognized as a septuple champion in history (counting championships from minor sanctioning bodies). WBC Super Featherweight Championship - August 7, 1983 – 1984, WBC Lightweight Championship - August 10, 1985 – 1987, WBO Light Welterweight Champion - March 6, 1989 – February 23, 1991, WBO Light Welterweight Champion - May 18, 1991–1992.
12	Mario Rivera Martino	2019	First Puerto Rican boxing sports writer to be inducted into the International Boxing Hall of Fame. He served Puerto Rican boxing for more than 50 years as a writer and eventual commissioner.
13	Miguel Cotto	2022	He is a multiple-time world champion, and the first Puerto Rican boxer to win world titles in four weight classes, from light welterweight to middleweight. In 2007 and 2009,
