= Shawty (disambiguation) =

Shawty is a word used as a term of endearment, or catcall.

Shawty may also refer to:

- "Shawty" (song), by Plies, 2007
- "Shawty", a 2020 song by Luciano

== See also ==
- Shawty Lo (1976–2016), American rapper
- Shawty Redd (born 1983), American record producer, rapper, and songwriter
- Shorty (disambiguation)
- Hey Shawty (disambiguation)
