= Hey Shawty =

Hey Shawty may refer to:

- "Hey Shawty", a song by Field Mob featuring Suthern Klick from the 2000 album 613: Ashy to Classy
- "Hey Shawty", a song by I-20 featuring Devin the Dude from the 2004 album Self Explanatory

== See also ==
- Shawty (disambiguation)
