= World Colored Welterweight Championship =

The World Colored Welterweight Championship was a title that existed during the time of the color bar in professional boxing.

On 26 July 1936, Herbert Lewis Hardwick ("The Cocoa Kid") met Young Peter Jackson at Heinemann Park in New Orleans, Louisiana in a 10-round title bout referred by Harry Wills, the former three-time World Colored Heavyweight Champ. The Cocoa Kid won via a technical knock-out in the second round.

He made four defenses of the title. On September 22 of that year at the same venue, he defeated Jackie Elverillo on points in 10 rounds. On 11 June 1937, at the Coliseum Arena in New Orleans, The Kid fought his old nemesis Holman Williams, prevailing in a close fight, winning a decision in the 12-rounder. Ring Magazine had donated a championship belt for the bout.

The Kid successfully defended his title against Black Canadian boxer Sonny Jones at the Valley Arena in Holyoke, Massachusetts on 15 November 1937, in a bout refereed by former world heavyweight champ Jack Sharkey. The Kid scored a technical knock out in the sixth round of their 15-round bout. The Kid had devastated Jones in the third with a right to his jaw and opened a cut over Sonny's left eye with another right. Eventually, Sharkey stopped the fight as Jones could barely see.

The ascension of Henry Armstrong as the world welterweight champ on 31 May 1938 (when he beat Barney Ross) seemingly made the title redundant (the World Colored Heavyweight Championship expired when Joe Louis became world heavyweight champ in 1937 and the World Colored Middleweight Championship became defunct for 16 years after Tiger Flowers won the world middleweight title in 1926), but it was still contested during Armstrong's reign.

The Cocoa Kid lost the title to Charley Burley on 22 August 1938, at Hickey Park in Millvale, Pennsylvania. Burley won a unanimous decision in the 15-round bout, knocking the Kid to the canvas three times and defeating him decisively, taking his title. Burley never defended the title, probably out of a desire to get a title shot with Armstrong. To fill the vacant title, The Kid and Holman Williams met in a rematch on 11 January 1940 at the Coliseum in Baltimore, Maryland. The Kid won a unanimous decision in their 15-round title bout, winning the title for a second time.

The Cocoa Kid never defended his second title. He won the revived World Colored Middleweight Championship in 1943.

== List of champions ==
#	Name	Reign	Date	Days held	Location	Defenses	Notes
1	Eddie Palmer	1	September 26, 1912	872	New Orleans, Louisiana; USA	2	Title was presented by Orleans Athletic Club.
2	Gorilla Jones ("The Fighting Gorilla")	1	February 15, 1915	Unknown	New Orleans, Louisiana; USA	0	Jones did not defend title.
3	Cocoa Kid	1	July 26, 1936	757	New Orleans, Louisiana; USA	3	Defeated Young Peter Jackson by a TKO in the 2nd round.
4	Charley Burley	1	August 22, 1938	Unknown	Millvale, Pennsylvania; USA	0	Defeated The Cocoa Kid via Unanimous Decision in 15-round bout; vacated title.
5	Cocoa Kid	2	January 11, 1940	Unknown	Baltimore, Maryland; USA	0	Title became defunct as African American Henry Armstrong had been world welterweight champ since August 17, 1938.

== See also ==
- World Colored Heavyweight Championship
- World Colored Light Heavyweight Championship
- World Colored Middleweight Championship
