= Charley Burley =

American boxer (1917–1992)

Personal information
- Nationality: American
- Born: Charles Duane Burley; September 6, 1917 Bessemer, Pennsylvania, U.S.
- Died: October 16, 1992 (aged 75)
- Height: 5 ft 9 in (1.75 m)
- Weight: Middleweight; Welterweight

Boxing career
- Stance: Orthodox

Boxing record
- Total fights: 98
- Wins: 83
- Win by KO: 50
- Losses: 12
- Draws: 2
- No contests: 1

Charley Burley (September 6, 1917 – October 16, 1992) was an American boxer who fought as a welterweight and middleweight from 1936 to 1950. Archie Moore, the light-heavyweight champion who was defeated by Burley in a 1944 middleweight bout, was one of several fighters who called Burley the greatest fighter ever. Burley was the penultimate holder of both the World Colored Welterweight Championship and the World Colored Middleweight Championship.

== Early life ==
He was born Charles Duane Burley in Bessemer, Pennsylvania on September 6, 1917 to a mixed-race couple: his father was a black coal miner and his mother a white Irish immigrant from County Cork. Raised in Bessemer, the only son of seven children, the family moved to Pittsburgh when his father was killed in an industrial accident in 1925.

He began boxing at the age of 12 at a Boys Club and, as a lightweight, won city, state and national junior boxing titles and a Golden Gloves junior title. As a welterweight, he won a Golden Gloves Senior and lost the 1936 National Senior Championship finals. That same year, he refused an invitation to participate in the Olympic trials due to his objection to the Nazi regime. He did accept an invitation to attend a scheduled 'Workers Games' to be held in Republican Spain as a protest to the 1936 Berlin Summer Olympics, but the games were cancelled by the outbreak of the Spanish Civil War.

Burley had also excelled at baseball. He reportedly was offered a contract by the Homestead Grays, the local Negro leagues franchise.

== Pro boxing career ==
The 5'9 ½ Burley fought at weights between 145 and 162 lbs. He made his pro debut on September 29, 1936, fighting as a welterweight at 150¾ lbs., at Pittsburgh's Moose Temple. He knocked out George Liggins in the fourth round of a four-round bout. Less than two years later, on August 22, 1938, Burley met the Cocoa Kid at Hickey Park in Millvale, Pennsylvania for the World Colored Welterweight Championship. He won a unanimous decision in the 15-round bout, knocking the Kid to the canvas three times and defeating him decisively, taking his title.

Burley did not defend that title, possibly as part of a strategy to win a shot at Henry Armstrong's World Welterweight title. He won the World Colored Middleweight Title in a ninth round technical knockout against Holman Williams at Victory Arena in New Orleans, Louisiana on 14 August 1942. In their rematch for the title two months later at the same venue, Williams won a 15-round decision. Jack Kincaid of the Times-Picayune reported that Burley had won nine rounds of the fight and had been the aggressor throughout.

Burley was never granted a world title shot by any of the world welterweight and world middleweight champions of his era and was avoided by many of the top white contenders. Among the fighters who "ducked" Burley were Hall of Famers Billy Conn (who twice fought Joe Louis for the heavyweight title), Frenchman Marcel Cerdan (who was supposed to face Burley in his American debut) and even Sugar Ray Robinson, considered by many boxing historians as the best pound-for-pound fighter of all time.

Of course, not everyone ducked the slick Pittsburgh warrior. Burley won two out of three matches against future welterweight champion Fritzie Zivic, defeated the great Archie Moore by decision, and easily defeated future NYSAC middleweight king Billy Soose. Burley also faced future heavyweight champion Ezzard Charles, but dropped two 10-round decisions to him (the bouts were contested within a five-week period, sandwiching a fight against Holman Williams). Another notable Burley fight was the one against heavyweight J.D. Turner, who outweighed him by around 70 lbs. "Turner, face beaten to raw beefsteak in six rounds, failed to answer the bell for the seventh." (The Ring, June 1942).

Burley himself was never stopped in 98 bouts. He compiled a record of 83 wins (50 by knockout) against 12 losses and two draws with 1 "no contest". He also battled financial problems at times during his career (which is why he's thought to have lost some of the fights he did) and was forced to work as an aircraft mechanic and garbage man in order to earn enough money to live off.

== Legacy ==
Burley's second fight with Oakland Billy Smith in 1946 is the only boxing film for him that is known to exist. It shows a conservative counter-puncher taming a much larger opponent with relative ease. During the fight Burley showed remarkable defense using the crab style while slipping and using the shoulder roll to avoid punches. Burley is also seen throwing a spear jab to split Smith's guard during the fight.

Burley's former sparring partner A.J. "Blackie" Nelson offers this comparison: "I see a lot of Charley in this kid, Roy Jones Jr. Both had unorthodox styles, could hit you from any angle, both hard to hit. Charley jabbed more than Jones, if Jones would concentrate on boxing as Charley did, he would become an all-time great."

Eddie Futch, the great trainer, called Burley "the finest all-around fighter I ever saw."

Burley was named to the Ring Magazine's list of 100 greatest punchers of all time, elected to the Boxing Hall of Fame in 1983 and the International Boxing Hall of Fame in 1992.

Burley was ranked 39th on Ring Magazine's list of the 80 Best Fighters of the Last 80 Years.

An exhibit at the Western Pennsylvania Sports Museum at Pittsburgh's Senator Heinz History Center states that Burley was the model for the character Troy in August Wilson's play Fences.

== Professional boxing record ==
98 fights	83 wins	12 losses
By knockout	50	0
By decision	33	12
Draws	2	
No contests	1	

No.	Result	Record	Opponent	Type	Round	Date	Location	Notes
98	Win	83–12–2 (1)	Pilar Bastidas	PTS	10	Jul 22, 1950	Plaza de Toros de Acho, Lima, Peru	
97	Win	82–12–2 (1)	Buddy Hodnett	KO	6 (8)	Mar 2, 1950	Aragon Gardens, Pittsburgh, Pennsylvania, U.S.	
96	Win	81–12–2 (1)	Chuck Higgins	KO	1 (8)	Feb 2, 1950	Aragon Gardens, Pittsburgh, Pennsylvania, U.S.	
95	Win	80–12–2 (1)	Willie Wright	PTS	8	Jul 25, 1949	Zivic Arena, Millvale, Pennsylvania, U.S.	
94	Loss	79–12–2 (1)	Charley Doc Williams	PTS	10	Apr 3, 1949	Coliseum Arena, New Orleans, Louisiana, U.S.	
93	Win	79–11–2 (1)	Lonnie Craft	KO	3 (6)	Mar 24, 1948	Huntington, West Virginia, U.S.	
92	Win	78–11–2 (1)	Larry Cartwright	TKO	8 (10)	Aug 8, 1947	Huntington, West Virginia, U.S.	
91	Loss	77–11–2 (1)	Bert Lytell	UD	10	Feb 17, 1947	Coliseum, Baltimore, Maryland, U.S.	
90	Win	77–10–2 (1)	Bert Lytell	UD	10	Aug 5, 1946	Zivic Arena, Millvale, Pennsylvania, U.S.	
89	Win	76–10–2 (1)	Charley Banks	PTS	10	Jul 16, 1946	Zivic Arena, Millvale, Pennsylvania, U.S.	
88	Win	75–10–2 (1)	Oakland Billy Smith	PTS	10	Apr 24, 1946	Civic Auditorium, San Francisco, California, U.S.	
87	Win	74–10–2 (1)	Paulie Peters	TKO	2 (10)	Apr 8, 1946	Civic Auditorium, San Francisco, California, U.S.	
86	Win	73–10–2 (1)	Charley Dodson	TKO	3 (10)	Mar 14, 1946	Aragon Gardens, Pittsburgh, Pennsylvania, U.S.	
85	Win	72–10–2 (1)	Oakland Billy Smith	PTS	10	Oct 8, 1945	Civic Auditorium, San Francisco, California, U.S.	
84	Win	71–10–2 (1)	Speedy Duvall	KO	4 (10)	Sep 28, 1945	Coliseum Arena, New Orleans, Louisiana, U.S.	
83	Win	70–10–2 (1)	Dave Clark	KO	1 (10)	Sep 4, 1945	Music Hall Arena, Cincinnati, Ohio, U.S.	
82	Win	69–10–2 (1)	Aaron Wade	UD	10	Aug 20, 1945	Forbes Field, Pittsburgh, Pennsylvania, U.S.	
81	Win	68–10–2 (1)	Oscar Boyd	KO	2 (8)	Jul 26, 1945	Forbes Field, Pittsburgh, Pennsylvania, U.S.	
80	Loss	67–10–2 (1)	Holman Williams	UD	12	Jul 11, 1945	Civic Stadium, Buffalo, New York, U.S.	
79	Win	67–9–2 (1)	Joe Carter	UD	10	Mar 12, 1945	Civic Auditorium, San Francisco, California, U.S.	
78	Win	66–9–2 (1)	Jack Chase	TKO	12 (15)	Sep 11, 1944	Civic Auditorium, San Francisco, California, U.S.	Retained USA California state middleweight title
77	Win	65–9–2 (1)	Young Gene Buffalo	TKO	5 (10)	Aug 28, 1944	Civic Auditorium, San Francisco, California, U.S.	
76	Win	64–9–2 (1)	Frankie Nelson	TKO	7 (10)	Jun 23, 1944	Legion Stadium, Hollywood, California, U.S.	
75	Win	63–9–2 (1)	Al Gilbert	TKO	4 (10)	May 12, 1944	Coliseum, San Diego, California, U.S.	
74	Win	62–9–2 (1)	Archie Moore	PTS	10	Apr 21, 1944	Legion Stadium, Hollywood, California, U.S.	
73	Win	61–9–2 (1)	Jack Chase	KO	9 (15)	Apr 6, 1944	Legion Stadium, Hollywood, California, U.S.	Won USA California state middleweight title
72	Win	60–9–2 (1)	Aaron Wade	PTS	10	Mar 24, 1944	Coliseum, San Diego, California, U.S.	
71	Win	59–9–2 (1)	Bobby Berger	KO	5 (10)	Mar 3, 1944	Coliseum, San Diego, California, U.S.	
70	Win	58–9–2 (1)	Bobby Birch	PTS	10	Jun 26, 1943	Lane Field, San Diego, California, U.S.	
69	NC	57–9–2 (1)	Holman Williams	NC	10 (10)	May 14, 1943	Legion Stadium, Hollywood, California, U.S.	The referee declared the fight no contest after one minute of the 10th round because of inactivity
68	Draw	57–9–2	Herbert Lewis Hardwick	PTS	10	Apr 19, 1943	Pelican Stadium, New Orleans, Louisiana, U.S.	
67	Win	57–9–1	Aaron Wade	PTS	10	Mar 3, 1943	Auditorium, Oakland, California, U.S.	
66	Win	56–9–1	Jack Chase	UD	10	Feb 19, 1943	Legion Stadium, Hollywood, California, U.S.	
65	Win	55–9–1	Harvey Massey	TKO	9 (10)	Feb 3, 1943	Auditorium, Oakland, California, U.S.	
64	Loss	54–9–1	Lloyd Marshall	SD	10	Dec 11, 1942	Legion Stadium, Hollywood, California, U.S.	
63	Win	54–8–1	Cecilio Lozada	TKO	2 (10)	Nov 13, 1942	Coliseum, San Diego, California, U.S.	
62	Loss	53–8–1	Holman Williams	UD	15	Oct 16, 1942	Municipal Auditorium, New Orleans, Louisiana, U.S.	Lost world colored middleweight title
61	Win	53–7–1	Holman Williams	TKO	9 (15)	Aug 14, 1942	Victory Arena, New Orleans, Louisiana, U.S.	Won vacant world colored middleweight title
60	Loss	52–7–1	Ezzard Charles	UD	10	Jun 29, 1942	Hickey Park, Millvale, Pennsylvania, U.S.	
59	Win	52–6–1	Holman Williams	PTS	10	Jun 23, 1942	Crosley Field, Cincinnati, Ohio, U.S.	
58	Loss	51–6–1	Ezzard Charles	UD	10	May 25, 1942	Forbes Field, Pittsburgh, Pennsylvania, U.S.	
57	Win	51–5–1	George Wilson	KO	2 (10)	Apr 30, 1942	Armory, Minneapolis, Minnesota, U.S.	
56	Win	50–5–1	Joe Sutka	KO	4 (8)	Apr 24, 1942	Coliseum, Chicago, Illinois, U.S.	
55	Win	49–5–1	Phil McQuillan	KO	1 (8)	Apr 20, 1942	St. Nicholas Arena, New York City, New York, U.S.	
54	Win	48–5–1	Cleo McNeal	KO	5 (10)	Apr 9, 1942	Armory, Minneapolis, Minnesota, U.S.	
53	Win	47–5–1	Jay D Turner	TKO	7 (10)	Mar 13, 1942	Armory, Minneapolis, Minnesota, U.S.	
52	Win	46–5–1	Holman Williams	UD	10	Feb 26, 1942	Armory, Minneapolis, Minnesota, U.S.	
51	Win	45–5–1	Shorty Hogue	RTD	6 (10)	Feb 13, 1942	Coliseum, San Diego, California, U.S.	
50	Win	44–5–1	Milo Theodorescu	TKO	4 (10)	Feb 6, 1942	Coliseum, San Diego, California, U.S.	
49	Win	43–5–1	Jackie Burke	TKO	5 (10)	Jan 23, 1942	Armory, Minneapolis, Minnesota, U.S.	
48	Win	42–5–1	Shorty Hogue	TKO	10 (10)	Jan 9, 1942	Armory, Minneapolis, Minnesota, U.S.	
47	Win	41–5–1	Jerry Hayes	KO	4 (10)	Dec 23, 1941	City Auditorium, Eau Claire, Wisconsin, U.S.	
46	Win	40–5–1	Ted Morrison	TKO	2 (8)	Dec 12, 1941	Armory, Minneapolis, Minnesota, U.S.	
45	Win	39–5–1	Antonio Fernandez	PTS	10	Sep 25, 1941	Convention Hall, Philadelphia, Pennsylvania, U.S.	
44	Win	38–5–1	Otto Blackwell	PTS	8	Aug 25, 1941	Gardens, Philadelphia, Pennsylvania, U.S.	
43	Win	37–5–1	Young Gene Buffalo	TKO	5 (10)	Jul 14, 1941	Gardens, Philadelphia, Pennsylvania, U.S.	
42	Win	36–5–1	Ossie Harris	TKO	9 (10)	Jun 2, 1941	Hickey Park, Millvale, Pennsylvania, U.S.	
41	Win	35–5–1	Eddie Ellis	TKO	5 (8)	Apr 18, 1941	Boston Garden, Boston, Massachusetts, U.S.	
40	Win	34–5–1	Babe Synnott	TKO	5 (8)	Mar 31, 1941	Duquesne Gardens, Pittsburgh, Pennsylvania, U.S.	
39	Win	33–5–1	Vince Pimpinella	PTS	10	Nov 11, 1940	Turner's Arena, Washington, D.C., U.S.	
38	Win	32–5–1	Ernest Peirce	PTS	10	Oct 17, 1940	Butler Street Sports Arena, Pittsburgh, Pennsylvania, U.S.	
37	Loss	31–5–1	Jimmy Bivins	UD	10	Sep 3, 1940	Hickey Park, Millvale, Pennsylvania, U.S.	
36	Win	31–4–1	Kenny LaSalle	UD	10	Aug 19, 1940	Hickey Park, Millvale, Pennsylvania, U.S.	
35	Draw	30–4–1	Georgie Abrams	PTS	10	Jul 29, 1940	Hickey Park, Millvale, Pennsylvania, U.S.	
34	Win	30–4	Carl Dell	PTS	10	Jun 17, 1940	Valley Arena, Holyoke, Massachusetts, U.S.	
33	Win	29–4	Sam Edwards	KO	2 (10)	Apr 26, 1940	Coliseum Arena, New Orleans, Louisiana, U.S.	
32	Win	28–4	Baby Kid Chocolate	TKO	5 (10)	Apr 12, 1940	Coliseum Arena, New Orleans, Louisiana, U.S.	
31	Win	27–4	Nate Bolden	PTS	10	Feb 12, 1940	Duquesne Gardens, Pittsburgh, Pennsylvania, U.S.	
30	Loss	26–4	Holman Williams	PTS	15	Dec 1, 1939	Coliseum Arena, New Orleans, Louisiana, U.S.	
29	Win	26–3	Mickey Makar	KO	1 (10)	Oct 23, 1939	Moose Temple, Pittsburgh, Pennsylvania, U.S.	
28	Win	25–3	Jimmy Leto	PTS	10	Aug 28, 1939	Forbes Field, Pittsburgh, Pennsylvania, U.S.	
27	Win	24–3	Fritzie Zivic	UD	10	Jul 17, 1939	Forbes Field, Pittsburgh, Pennsylvania, U.S.	
26	Loss	23–3	Jimmy Leto	SD	10	Jun 20, 1939	Hickey Park, Millvale, Pennsylvania, U.S.	
25	Win	23–2	Sonny Jones	TKO	7 (12)	Jan 10, 1939	Motor Square Garden, Pittsburgh, Pennsylvania, U.S.	
24	Win	22–2	Billy Soose	UD	10	Nov 21, 1938	Motor Square Garden, Pittsburgh, Pennsylvania, U.S.	
23	Win	21–2	Werther Arcelli	KO	1 (10)	Nov 3, 1938	Duquesne Gardens, Pittsburgh, Pennsylvania, U.S.	
22	Win	20–2	Herbert Lewis Hardwick	UD	15	Aug 22, 1938	Hickey Park, Millvale, Pennsylvania, U.S.	Won world colored welterweight title
21	Win	19–2	Leon Zorrita	UD	10	Aug 2, 1938	Hickey Park, Millvale, Pennsylvania, U.S.	
20	Win	18–2	Fritzie Zivic	UD	10	Jun 13, 1938	Hickey Park, Millvale, Pennsylvania, U.S.	
19	Win	17–2	Mike Barto	TKO	4 (10)	Jun 1, 1938	Hickey Park, Millvale, Pennsylvania, U.S.	
18	Loss	16–2	Fritzie Zivic	SD	10	Mar 21, 1938	Motor Square Garden, Pittsburgh, Pennsylvania, U.S.	
17	Win	16–1	Art Tate	KO	2 (6)	Mar 3, 1938	Duquesne Gardens, Pittsburgh, Pennsylvania, U.S.	
16	Win	15–1	Carl Turner	UD	4	Feb 10, 1938	Duquesne Gardens, Pittsburgh, Pennsylvania, U.S.	
15	Win	14–1	Johnny Folio	PTS	4	Feb 3, 1938	Duquesne Gardens, Pittsburgh, Pennsylvania, U.S.	
14	Win	13–1	Tiger Jackson	KO	2 (4)	Jan 27, 1938	Duquesne Gardens, Pittsburgh, Pennsylvania, U.S.	
13	Loss	12–1	Eddie Dolan	UD	8	Sep 9, 1937	Hickey Park, Millvale, Pennsylvania, U.S.	
12	Win	12–0	Sammy Grippe	TKO	6 (8)	Aug 16, 1937	Hickey Park, Millvale, Pennsylvania, U.S.	
11	Win	11–0	Remo Fernandez	TKO	7 (8)	Aug 9, 1937	Hickey Park, Millvale, Pennsylvania, U.S.	
10	Win	10–0	Mickey O'Brien	PTS	10	Jun 24, 1937	Hickey Park, Millvale, Pennsylvania, U.S.	
9	Win	9–0	Keith Goodballet	TKO	2 (8)	May 27, 1937	Duquesne Gardens, Pittsburgh, Pennsylvania, U.S.	
8	Win	8–0	Sammy Grippe	PTS	6	May 3, 1937	Duquesne Gardens, Pittsburgh, Pennsylvania, U.S.	
7	Win	7–0	Ray Gray	PTS	6	Apr 19, 1937	Motor Square Garden, Pittsburgh, Pennsylvania, U.S.	
6	Win	6–0	Johnny Folio	TKO	5 (8)	Apr 15, 1937	Palisades Rink, McKeesport, Pennsylvania, U.S.	
5	Win	5–0	Ray Collins	TKO	5 (8)	Feb 8, 1937	Oil City, Pennsylvania, U.S.	
4	Win	4–0	Ralph Gizzy	KO	2 (8)	Jan 22, 1937	K. of C. Hall, Oil City, Pennsylvania, U.S.	
3	Win	3–0	Eddie Wirko	TKO	5 (6)	Nov 9, 1936	Moose Lodge, Pittsburgh, Pennsylvania, U.S.	
2	Win	2–0	Ralph Gizzy	PTS	6	Oct 22, 1936	Duquesne Gardens, Pittsburgh, Pennsylvania, U.S.	
1	Win	1–0	George Liggins	KO	4 (4)	Sep 29, 1936	Moose Temple, Pittsburgh, Pennsylvania, U.S.	

== See also ==
- List of bare-knuckle boxers
- Murderers' Row (Boxing)

Awards and achievements
Preceded by Cocoa Kid	World Colored Welterweight Championship; August 22, 1938 - Unknown	Succeeded by Cocoa Kid
Preceded by Unknown	World Colored Middleweight Championship; August 14, 1942 - October 16, 1942	Succeeded by Holman Williams
