= Shorty (film) =

- Directed by: Jon Chang
- Written by: Jon Chang
- Produced by: Jon Chang
- Starring: Andre Canty; Michele Persley; Frank Mayers; Robert Scott
- Distributed by: Noontide Filmworks
- Release date: April 14, 2000
- Running time: 27 minutes
- Language: English

Shorty is a 2000 film produced by Noontide Filmworks, written, produced and directed by Jon Chang. The story follows Russell, aka "shorty", a modern urban Cyrano afflicted by his lack of height. shorty is played by Andre Canty, with Michele Persley as Venus and Frank Mayers as Eric. "Shorty" has screened at several film festivals in North America, and has received various awards, including the HBO "Short" Film Award at the 2001 Acapulco Black Film Festival, now known as the American Black Film Festival.
