= Young Peter Jackson (boxer, born 1912) =

American boxer (1912-1979)

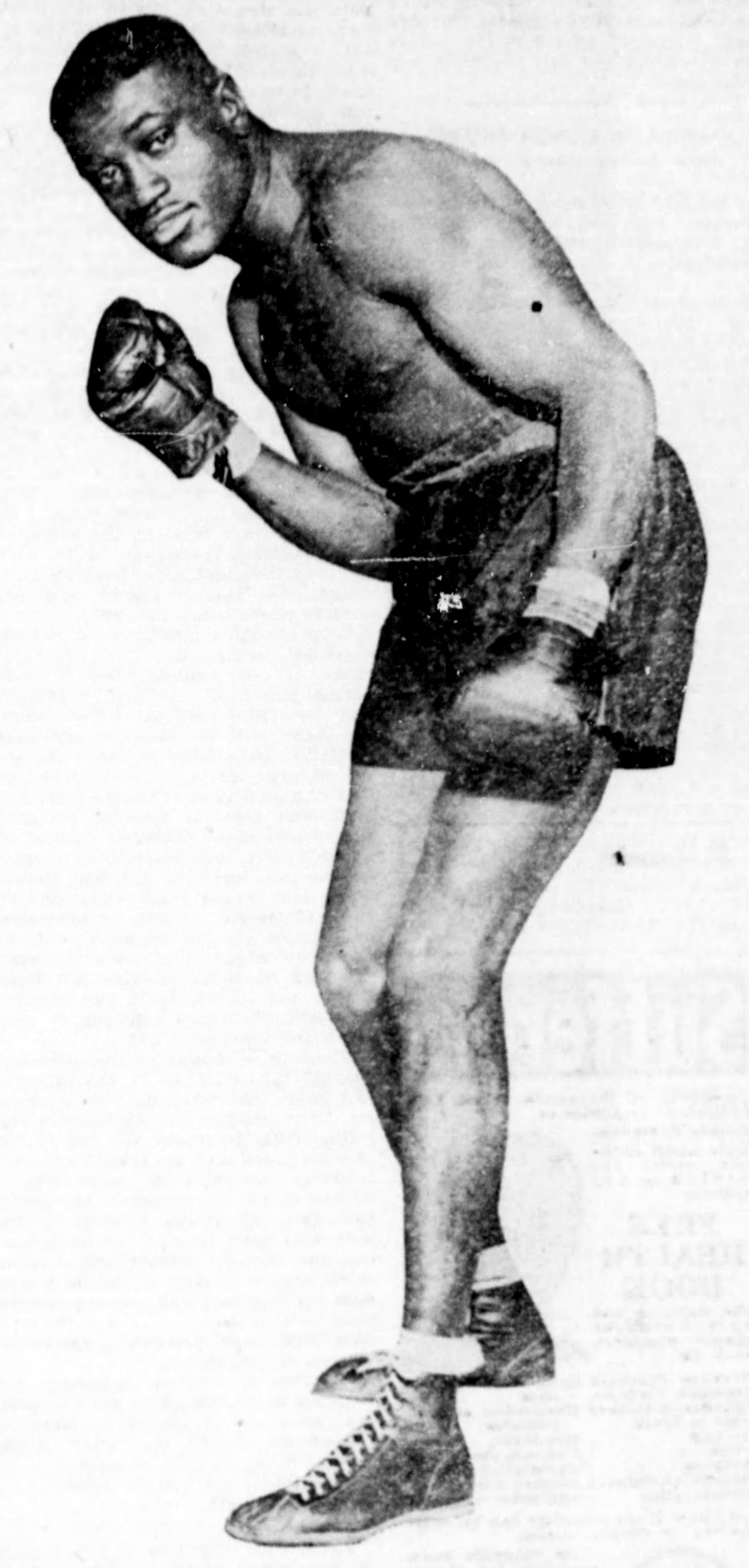
- Jackson, circa 1933

Personal information
- Nationality: American
- Born: Peter Martin; April 15, 1912 Los Angeles, California
- Died: April 9, 1979 (aged 66)
- Height: 5 ft 7 in (1.70 m)
- Weight: Lightweight

Boxing career
- Reach: 70 in (178 cm)
- Stance: Orthodox

Boxing record
- Total fights: 74
- Wins: 51
- Win by KO: 25
- Losses: 19
- Draws: 4

Young Peter Jackson (April 15, 1912 – April 9, 1979) was an African American boxer active from 1929 to 1939. Born Peter Martin in Los Angeles, California, he renamed himself in honor of the great colored heavyweight champ Peter Jackson and the welterweight contender Peter Jackson. The 5'7" Jackson fought as a lightweight, making his professional debut on August 14, 1929 at the Wilmington Bowl in Wilmington, California, when he knocked out Herb Yales via a knock out in the first round of a scheduled four-round bout.

Jackson won the USA California State lightweight title on January 12, 1932, defeating Young Manuel (Manuel Villa I), then won the vacant Pacific Coast Lightweight title on July 25, 1933 by defeating Ah Wing Lee. He held and defended both titles and added the Mexican Lightweight title by defeating Young Manuel on March 31, 1935.

On 26 July 1936, he met Herbert Lewis Hardwick ("The Cocoa Kid") at Heinemann Park in New Orleans, Louisiana for the new World Colored Welterweight Championship. In the scheduled 10-round title bout referred by Harry Wills, the former three-time World Colored Heavyweight Champ, The Cocoa Kid won via a technical knock-out in the second round.

After losing the colored welterweight title (he never defended any of his other titles after that loss), his career floundered. In his last 18 fights through his retirement in 1939, he lost nine times, drew once and had a no decision in another fight. In his career, he racked up a record of 51 wins (25 by K.O.) against 19 losses (he was K.O.-ed three times) and four draws.
