= Shorty Hogue =

American boxer

Willis 'Shorty' Hogue was an American boxer in California during the 1940s, along with Lloyd Marshall, Charley Burley, Jack Chase (Young Joe Louis), Archie Moore and Eddie Booker. He had a twin brother, Willard, known as "Big Boy" Hogue, who also boxed in this era. No complete record exists for either brother, but Shorty Hogue was once ranked #3 at middleweight by Ring magazine. He scored three wins over Archie Moore and beat Jack Chase, Johnny "Bandit" Romero and Eddie Booker. His win over Booker earned him the California Middleweight Championship. Around this time, the World Championships were frozen by World War II, and most of the best middleweights of the era fought over the California title. Charley Burley stopped Hogue in 1942, and after that, Hogue's career hit the doldrums. Most of Hogue's bouts after this were knockout losses, including one to Eddie Booker, in which he lost the California Middleweight Championship.
