= Nokia 2115i =

Mobile phone model

The Nokia 2115i, 2116i, most commonly known as Nokia Shorty is an entry CDMA candybar style mobile phone. The 2115i is a discontinued model that was sold by MetroPCS, the 2116i is a slight variant also sold by MetroPCS. The Shorty, the most popular of the siblings, is sold as a prepaid mobile phone by Virgin Mobile.

== Reception ==
Stewart Wolpin of CNET gave the phone 2.5 out of 5 stars, positively mentioning the compact design, speakerphone and "solid call quality" while chastising its "small, monochrome screen", lack of web browser and cheap feel, with the bottom line stating "A throwback cell phone with few bells and whistles, the Nokia 2115i for Virgin Mobile is designed almost purely for making and receiving occasional calls."
