= Willi Besmanoff =

German boxer

Personal information
- Nationality: German citizenship
- Born: William David Besmanoff; October 4, 1932 Munich, Bavaria, Weimar Republic
- Died: October 20, 2010 (aged 78) Jacksonville, Florida, U.S.
- Height: 5 ft 11 in (1.80 m)
- Weight: Heavyweight

Boxing career
- Stance: Orthodox

Boxing record
- Total fights: 93
- Wins: 51
- Win by KO: 19
- Losses: 34
- Draws: 8
- No contests: 0

William David Besmanoff (October 4, 1932 – October 20, 2010) was a German boxer who was a heavyweight contender in the 1950s. He was born in Munich, Germany. His father was Jewish American. When Willi was 11, he was imprisoned in the Buchenwald concentration camp for a short time. In the 1950s he moved to Milwaukee, Wisconsin, and became an American citizen.

Making his professional debut in 1952, Besmanoff mainly fought in Germany for the first half of his career, before subsequently relocating to the United States. Besmanoff fought many top contenders of the era, including Sonny Liston, Archie Moore, George Chuvalo, Zora Folley, Eddie Machen, Roy Harris, Willie Pastrano and Bob Foster. He was also an early opponent of Cassius Clay. He retired in 1967, with a final record of 51–34–8.

== Professional boxing record ==
51 Wins (19 knockouts, 32 decisions), 34 Losses (11 knockouts, 23 decisions), 8 Draws
Result	Record	Opponent	Type	Round	Date	Location	Notes
Loss	53–32–8	(United States) Dave Zyglewicz	TKO	3	01/08/1967	(United States) Sam Houston Coliseum, Houston, Texas	Referee stopped the bout at 2:47 of the third round.
Loss	53–31–8	(Canada) George Chuvalo	RTD	2	27/05/1967	(United States) Cocoa Expo Sports Center, Cocoa, Florida	
Loss	53–30–8	(Canada) George Chuvalo	TKO	3	04/04/1967	(United States) Miami Beach Auditorium, Miami Beach, Florida	
Win	53–29–8	(United States) Mike Lanum	KO	9	09/12/1966	(United States) Civic Auditorium, Melbourne, Florida	
Loss	52–29–8	(United States) Mike Lanum	PTS	10	09/11/1966	(United States) Melbourne, Florida	
Win	52–28–8	(United States) Mike Lanum	SD	10	01/11/1966	(United States) Miami Beach Auditorium, Miami Beach, Florida	
Win	51–28–8	(United States) Gene Idelette	SD	10	22/09/1966	(United States) Melbourne, Florida	
Win	50–28–8	(United States) Willie Johnson	UD	10	12/08/1966	(United States) Civic Auditorium, Melbourne, Florida	
Win	49–28–8	(United States) Aaron Beasley	KO	1	22/07/1966	(United States) Civic Auditorium, Melbourne, Florida	
Win	48–28–8	(United States) Joe Louis White	SD	10	01/07/1966	(United States) Civic Auditorium, Melbourne, Florida	
Loss	47–28–8	(United States) Amos Johnson	TKO	6	17/12/1963	(United States) Akron Armory, Akron, Ohio	
Loss	47–27–8	(United States) Bob Foster	KO	3	11/12/1963	(United States) Norfolk, Virginia	
Draw	47–26–8	(United States) Duke Sabedong	PTS	10	14/11/1963	(United States) Mechanics Hall, Worcester, Massachusetts	
Win	47–26–7	(United States) Herb Siler	TKO	4	05/07/1963	(United States) Jacksonville Beach, Florida	
Loss	46–26–7	(United States) Cassius Clay	TKO	7	29/11/1961	(United States) Freedom Hall, Louisville, Kentucky	Referee stopped the bout at 1:55 of the seventh round.
Loss	46–25–7	(Argentina) Alejandro Lavorante	TKO	7	28/08/1961	(United States) San Francisco Civic Auditorium, San Francisco, California	
Loss	46–24–7	(Canada) George Chuvalo	TKO	4	27/06/1961	(Canada) Maple Leaf Gardens, Toronto, Ontario	
Loss	46–23–7	(United States) Young Jack Johnson	SD	10	18/02/1961	(United States) Fairgrounds Coliseum, Salt Lake City, Utah	
Loss	46–22–7	(United States) Pete Rademacher	UD	10	13/12/1960	(United States) Cleveland Arena, Cleveland, Ohio	
Win	46–21–7	(United States) Howard King	SD	10	21/11/1960	(United States) Las Vegas Convention Center, Las Vegas, Nevada	
Win	45–21–7	(United States) Jimmy McCarter	UD	10	18/10/1960	(United States) Seattle Civic Auditorium, Seattle, Washington	
Loss	44–21–7	(United States) Zora Folley	UD	10	16/09/1960	(United States) Southwest Washington Fairgrounds, Centralia, Washington	
Loss	44–20–7	(United States) George Logan	UD	10	08/08/1960	(United States) Boise, Idaho	
Loss	44–19–7	(United States) Archie Moore	TKO	10	25/05/1960	(United States) Indiana State Fair Coliseum, Indianapolis, Indiana	Non-title bout. Referee stopped the bout at 1:32 of the tenth round.
Loss	44–18–7	(United States) Tom McNeeley	PTS	10	14/03/1960	(United States) Boston Garden, Boston, Massachusetts	
Loss	44–17–7	(Canada) Bob Cleroux	UD	10	05/02/1960	(United States) Madison Square Garden, New York City	
Loss	44–16–7	(United States) Sonny Liston	TKO	7	09/12/1959	(United States) Cleveland Arena, Cleveland, Ohio	
Loss	44–15–7	(United States) Eddie Machen	UD	10	16/09/1959	(United States) Auditorium, Portland, Oregon	
Win	44–14–7	(United States) Marty Marshall	UD	10	01/08/1959	(United States) Harding Stadium, Steubenville, Ohio	
Win	43–14–7	(United States) Mike DeJohn	UD	10	16/06/1959	(United States) Milwaukee Auditorium, Milwaukee, Wisconsin	
Win	42–14–7	(United States) Alvin Williams	UD	10	18/05/1959	(United States) Milwaukee Auditorium, Milwaukee, Wisconsin	
Loss	41–14–7	(United States) Zora Folley	UD	10	07/04/1959	(United States) Denver, Colorado	
Loss	41–13–7	(United States) Donnie Fleeman	UD	10	26/01/1959	(United States) Milwaukee Auditorium, Milwaukee, Wisconsin	
Loss	41–12–7	(United States) Mike DeJohn	UD	10	28/11/1958	(United States) Madison Square Garden, New York City	
Win	41–11–7	(Argentina) Alex Miteff	RTD	1	23/09/1958	(United States) Seattle Civic Auditorium, Seattle, Washington	
Loss	40–11–7	(United States) Hal Carter	UD	10	13/06/1958	(United States) Madison Square Garden, New York City	
Loss	40–10–7	(United States) Archie Moore	SD	10	02/05/1958	(United States) Freedom Hall, Louisville, Kentucky	
Win	40–9–7	(United States) Pat McMurtry	SD	10	04/02/1958	(United States) Seattle Civic Auditorium, Seattle, Washington	
Loss	39–9–7	(United States) Willie Pastrano	UD	10	27/11/1957	(United States) Miami Beach Auditorium, Miami Beach, Florida	
Loss	39–8–7	(United States) Roy Harris	UD	10	29/10/1957	(United States) Sam Houston Coliseum, Houston, Texas	
Loss	39–7–7	(Canada) Yvon Durelle	UD	10	25/09/1957	(United States) Olympia Stadium, Detroit, Michigan	
Loss	39–6–7	(Argentina) Alex Miteff	UD	10	10/06/1957	(United States) St. Nicholas Arena, New York City	
Loss	39–5–7	(United States) Archie McBride	UD	10	20/05/1957	(United States) St. Nicholas Arena, New York City	
Win	39–4–7	(United States) Bob Baker	UD	10	01/04/1957	(United States) St. Nicholas Arena, New York City	
Win	38–4–7	(United States) Calvin Wilson	UD	10	25/02/1957	(United States) St. Nicholas Arena, New York City	
Win	37–4–7	(United States) Don Ellis	PTS	8	20/10/1956	(Germany) Westfalenhallen, Dortmund, North Rhine-Westphalia	
Win	36–4–7	(Germany) Albert Westphal	TKO	5	21/09/1956	(Germany) Ernst Merck Halle, Hamburg	
Win	35–4–7	(Italy) Artenio Calzavara	PTS	8	15/09/1956	(Italy) Velodromo Vigorelli, Milan, Lombardy	
Win	34–4–7	(France) Maurice Mols	TKO	9	07/09/1956	(Germany) Ostseehalle, Kiel, Schleswig-Holstein	
Win	33–4–7	(France) Eugene D'Alessio	PTS	8	28/06/1956	(Germany) Sportpalast, Schoeneberg, Berlin	
Win	32–4–7	(Germany) Erwin Hack	PTS	8	09/06/1956	(Germany) Rheinlandhalle, Krefeld, North Rhine-Westphalia	
Win	31–4–7	(Germany) Uwe Janssen	KO	8	11/05/1956	(Germany) Ernst Merck Halle, Hamburg	
Win	30–4–7	(Cambodia) Simon Ayankin	PTS	8	02/03/1956	(Germany) Ernst Merck Halle, Hamburg	
Win	29–4–7	(France) Jacques Bro	PTS	8	04/02/1956	(Germany) Festhalle Frankfurt, Frankfurt, Hesse	
Win	28–4–7	(United Kingdom) Alex Buxton	PTS	8	22/01/1956	(Germany) Westfalenhallen, Dortmund, North Rhine-Westphalia	
Win	27–4–7	(Belgium) Maurice DeMulder	KO	4	13/01/1956	(Germany) Sportpalast, Schoeneberg, Berlin	
Loss	26–4–7	(France) Jacques Bro	PTS	6	05/12/1955	Luxembourg City	
Loss	26–3–7	(Germany) Willi Hoepner	PTS	10	25/11/1955	(Germany) Ernst Merck Halle, Hamburg	Germany BDB Light Heavyweight Title.
Win	26–2–7	(Germany) Heinz Sachs	KO	6	14/10/1955	(Germany) Ostseehalle, Kiel, Schleswig-Holstein	
Win	25–2–7	(Spain) José González Sales	PTS	8	09/09/1955	(Germany) Sportpalast, Schoeneberg, Berlin	
Win	24–2–7	(Bermuda) Ed Smith	PTS	8	22/07/1955	(Germany) Ernst Merck Halle, Hamburg	
Draw	23–2–7	(Germany) Heinz Sachs	PTS	8	12/06/1955	(Germany) Westfalenhallen, Dortmund, North Rhine-Westphalia	
Loss	23–2–6	(Germany) Franz Szuzina	PTS	8	04/06/1955	(Germany) Eisstadion, Cologne, North Rhine-Westphalia	
Win	23–1–6	(France) Roland Guille	KO	3	20/05/1955	(Germany) Sportpalast, Schoeneberg, Berlin	
Draw	22–1–6	(Bermuda) Ed Smith	PTS	8	27/03/1955	(Germany) Westfalenhallen, Dortmund, North Rhine-Westphalia	
Win	22–1–5	(Netherlands) Wim Snoek	PTS	8	11/03/1955	(Germany) Ernst Merck Halle, Hamburg	
Win	21–1–5	(Trinidad and Tobago) Clair Redmond	KO	2	11/02/1955	(Germany) Sportpalast, Schoeneberg, Berlin	
Win	20–1–5	(Germany) Winfried Henne	TKO	4	21/01/1955	(Germany) Ernst Merck Halle, Hamburg	
Win	19–1–5	(Italy) Artenio Calzavara	PTS	8	10/12/1954	(Germany) Sportpalast, Schoeneberg, Berlin	
Win	18–1–5	(Spain) Domingo Lopez	DQ	8	25/09/1954	(Germany) Weser-Ems-Halle, Oldenburg, Lower Saxony	
Win	17–1–5	(Germany) Franz Szuzina	PTS	10	27/08/1954	(Germany) Sportpalast, Schoeneberg, Berlin	
Draw	16–1–5	(Germany) Franz Szuzina	PTS	8	11/07/1954	(Germany) Westfalenhallen, Dortmund, North Rhine-Westphalia	
Win	16–1–4	(Belgium) Marcel Limage	PTS	8	10/06/1954	(Germany) Sportpalast, Schoeneberg, Berlin	
Win	15–1–4	(United States) Austin Jones	PTS	8	09/04/1954	(Germany) Ernst Merck Halle, Hamburg	
Draw	14–1–4	(Spain) José González Sales	PTS	8	05/03/1954	(Germany) Sportpalast, Schoeneberg, Berlin	
Loss	14–1–3	(Germany) Hans Friedrich	PTS	8	22/01/1954	(Germany) Sportpalast, Schoeneberg, Berlin	
Win	14–0–3	(Belgium) Emile DeGreef	KO	3	15/01/1954	(Germany) Ernst Merck Halle, Hamburg	
Win	13–0–3	(Luxembourg) Jean Serres	TKO	5	27/12/1953	(Germany) Sportpalast, Schoeneberg, Berlin	
Win	12–0–3	(Luxembourg) Ray Schmit	PTS	6	04/12/1953	(Germany) Sportpalast, Schoeneberg, Berlin	
Win	11–0–3	(Germany) Hans Baumann	PTS	6	13/11/1953	(Germany) Seeback Saal, Bremerhaven, Bremen	
Win	10–0–3	(Austria) Karl Ameisbichler	TKO	8	07/10/1953	(Germany) Ernst-Merck-Halle, Hamburg	
Win	9–0–3	(Netherlands) Willy Schagen	KO	2	28/08/1953	(Germany) Sportpalast, Schoeneberg, Berlin	
Win	8–0–3	(Germany) Paul Schirrmann	PTS	4	05/07/1953	(Germany) Waldbühne, Westend, Berlin	
Draw	7–0–3	(Germany) Hans Strelecki	PTS	6	16/05/1953	(Germany) Sportpalast, Schoeneberg, Berlin	
Draw	7–0–2	(Austria) Karl Ameisbichler	PTS	6	17/04/1953	(Germany) Funkturmhalle, Westend, Berlin	
Draw	7–0–1	(Germany) Otto Bastian	PTS	6	15/02/1953	(Germany) Ausstellungshalle, Berlin	
Win	7–0	(Germany) Heinz Schreiber	KO	2	26/12/1952	(Germany) Funkturmhalle, Westend, Berlin	
Win	6–0	(Germany) Bruno Junkuhn	KO	2	21/11/1952	(Germany) Winterhalle, Munich, Bavaria	
Win	5–0	(Germany) Robert Sapion	PTS	6	09/11/1952	(Germany) Funkturmhalle, Westend, Berlin	
Win	4–0	(Germany) Willy Schmauser	PTS	6	17/10/1952	(Germany) Messehalle, Munich, Bavaria	
Win	3–0	(Germany) Franz Schoepgens	TKO	2	14/09/1952	(Germany) Praelat Schoeneberg, Schoeneberg, Berlin	
Win	2–0	(Germany) Emil Dimmer	PTS	4	05/09/1952	(Germany) Ausstellungshalle, Munich, Bavaria	
Win	1–0	(Germany) Heinz Schreiber	KO	4	15/08/1952	(Germany) Funkturmhalle, Westend, Berlin	
