= George Chuvalo =

Canadian boxer (1937–2026)

George Chuvalo CM OOnt
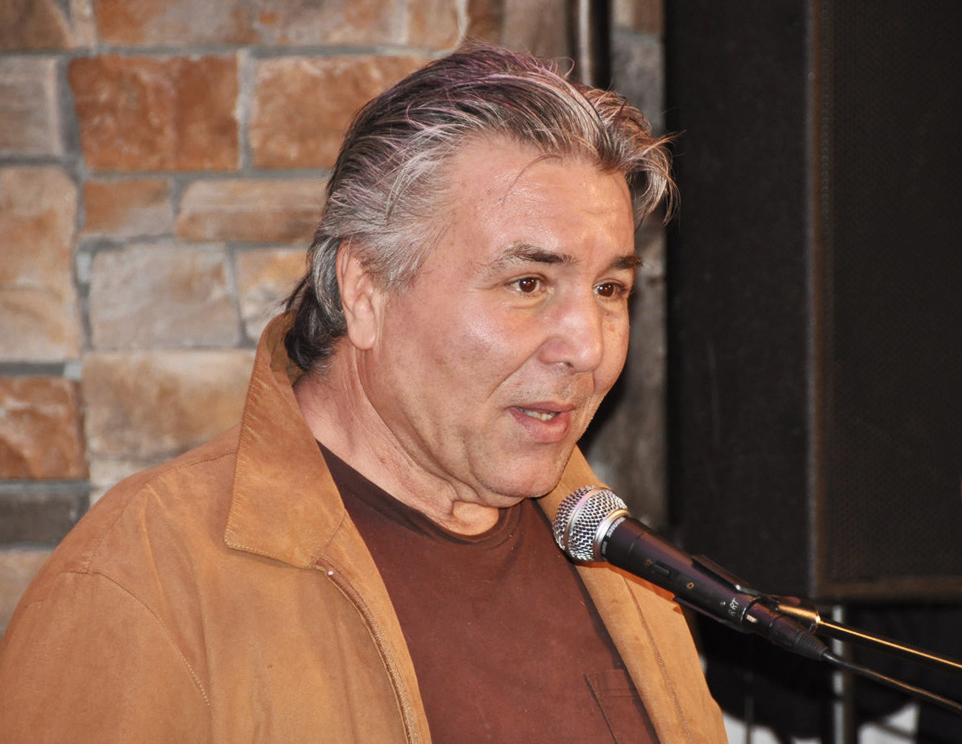
- Chuvalo in 2010

Personal information
- Born: Jure Čuvalo; September 12, 1937 Toronto, Ontario, Canada
- Died: September 12, 2026 (aged 89) Toronto, Ontario, Canada
- Height: 6 ft 0 in (183 cm)
- Weight: Heavyweight

Boxing career
- Reach: 82 in (208 cm)
- Stance: Orthodox

Boxing record
- Total fights: 93
- Wins: 73
- Win by KO: 64
- Losses: 18
- Draws: 2

George Louis Chuvalo CM OOnt (September 12, 1937 – September 12, 2026) was a Canadian professional boxer, who was a five-time national heavyweight champion and two-time world heavyweight title challenger. He was famous for having never been knocked down in any of his 93 professional bouts including fights against Muhammad Ali, Joe Frazier, and George Foreman. Chuvalo unsuccessfully challenged Muhammad Ali for the heavyweight championship in 1966. Chuvalo was inducted into the Ontario Sports Hall of Fame in 1995.

== Early life ==
Chuvalo was born on September 12, 1937, to Croatian immigrants Stjepan and Katica Čuvalo from Ljubuški in the Herzegovina region of what is today Bosnia and Herzegovina.

== Amateur career ==
Chuvalo became the Canadian amateur heavyweight champion in May 1955, defeating Winnipeg's Peter Piper with a first-round knockout (KO) in a tournament final in Regina, Saskatchewan. Chuvalo finished his amateur career with a 16–0 record, all by KO within four rounds.

== Professional career ==
=== Early career ===
Originally nicknamed "Boom Boom", Chuvalo turned professional in 1956, knocking out four opponents in one night to win a heavyweight tournament held by former world champion Jack Dempsey at Maple Leaf Gardens in Toronto on April 26, 1956.

Chuvalo's rankings as a heavyweight were: number 9 in 1963, number 5 in 1964, number 3 in 1965, number 8 in 1966, number 4 in 1968 and number 7 in 1970.

=== Against Ali ===
Chuvalo is best known for his two fights against Muhammad Ali. He went the distance both times, in each case, losing the decision by a wide margin on the scorecards. The first fight, on March 29, 1966, at Toronto's Maple Leaf Gardens, was for Ali's world heavyweight title. "He's the toughest guy I ever fought", said Ali of Chuvalo after the fight.

=== Other notable contests ===
Chuvalo defeated many heavyweights who were top ten contenders, including Johnny Arthur, Julio Mederos, Howard King, Alex Miteff, James J. Parker, Yvon Durelle, Bob Cleroux, Willie Besmanoff, Mike DeJohn, Doug Jones, Bill Nielsen, Dante Cane, Joe Bygraves, Manuel Ramos, Jerry Quarry and Cleveland Williams. Some of his controversial losses on decision were to Bob Cleroux (twice), Floyd Patterson (twice World heavyweight boxing champion and Ring Magazine Fighter of the Year), Ernie Terrell and Oscar Bonavena. His two draws against Alex Miteff and Tony Alongi were also controversial. In his defeats, Chuvalo failed to go the distance only in 1967 with Joe Frazier, and in 1970 with George Foreman. In both cases the referee stopped the fight while Chuvalo was still on his feet. He was also disqualified in 1961 against Joe Erskine (for headbutting—after complaining repeatedly about being fouled). Chuvalo holds the distinction of never being knocked down in his 93 professional bouts.

== Tributes and other appearances ==
Chuvalo appeared in theatrical films, with acting roles in I Miss You, Hugs and Kisses (1978), Stone Cold Dead (1979), The Fly (1986), Last Man Standing (1987), Prom Night III: The Last Kiss (1989), Lee's Offering (2005) and Sicilian Vampire (2015).

On television, Chuvalo had an acting role in the 1991 film The Return of Eliot Ness as Tony Urso, and on the crime-fighting series Counterstrike as the Ring Announcer for the fight between Sugar Duke (Richard Chevolleau) and Cal Sparks in the 1993 episode, "The Contender."

His 1966 match against Ali was the subject of Joseph Blasioli's 2003 documentary film The Last Round: Chuvalo vs. Ali.

On December 18, 2011, he was present for the unveiling of a statue in his honour in Ljubuški, his parents' birthplace.

The George Chuvalo Neighbourhood Centre in 2025

On May 11, 2019, the George Chuvalo Neighbourhood Centre in Toronto, Ontario, opened. It provides a variety of recreational programs for children as well as LGBTQ youth.

== Personal life ==
When Chuvalo was 21, he married 15-year-old Lynne, with whom he had five children. Three of Chuvalo's sons, Jesse, Steven, and George Lee, were heroin addicts. Heroin was introduced to the family by Jesse in 1984 after a severe motorbike accident led him to seek pain relief. The trio would often rob local pharmacies of prescription medication, for which they frequently served jail time. In February 1985, Jesse committed suicide, and over the next two months, Steven overdosed on heroin 15 times. In November 1993, less than a week after being released from prison for robbery, George Lee, who had survived a suicide attempt in prison and been threatening to intentionally overdose to reunite with Jesse, died of a heroin overdose. Four days after George's death, Chuvalo's grief-stricken wife Lynne committed suicide on November 4. In August 1996, despite recent attempts at improving his life, including nearing completion on a degree in Russian Literature from Queen's University, Steven was found dead of a heroin overdose. Following his children's deaths, Chuvalo went into a deep depression. By the time of Steven's death, Chuvalo had also found himself in financial distress; the mortgage on his home had been foreclosed, and the contents of his house were being removed by creditors, although his economic situation improved over the following decades, due primarily to his giving speeches about his family's travails. Chuvalo's son Mitchell is a high school teacher, while daughter Vanessa manages a food market.

Three months after Lynne's death, Chuvalo married his second wife, Joanne O'Hara, 20 years his junior, in January 1994. She already had two children from two previous relationships.

Chuvalo's life, including the blows he had received in his boxing career, had taken a toll on his cognitive abilities. In 2018, a judge ruled that Chuvalo did not have the mental capacity to determine if he wished to reconcile with his wife after living apart for several years, and by 2022, he was suffering from advanced dementia.

== Death ==
Chuvalo died on September 12, 2026, his 89th birthday.

== Recognition ==
In 1998, Chuvalo was appointed a Member of the Order of Canada (CM). He received the Queen Elizabeth II Golden Jubilee Medal in 2002, a star on Canada's Walk of Fame in 2005, and the Queen Elizabeth II Diamond Jubilee Medal in 2012. For his career success and anti-drug speaking campaigns, Chuvalo was awarded the key to the city of Toronto by mayor Rob Ford on March 26, 2013.

Chuvalo was appointed a Member of the Order of Ontario (OOnt) in 2021.

== Professional boxing record ==
93 fights	73 wins	18 losses
By knockout	64	2
By decision	9	15
By disqualification	0	1
Draws	2	

No.	Result	Record	Opponent	Type	Round	Date	Location	Notes
93	Win	73–18–2	George Jerome	TKO	3 (12)	Dec 11, 1978	St. Lawrence Market, Toronto, Canada	Retained Canadian heavyweight title
92	Win	72–18–2	Earl McLeay	TKO	1 (12)	Dec 8, 1977	Toronto, Ontario, Canada	Retained Canadian heavyweight title
91	Win	71–18–2	Bob Felstein	KO	9 (12)	Mar 7, 1977	North York Centennial Centre, Toronto, Canada	Won vacant Canadian heavyweight title
90	Win	70–18–2	Mike Boswell	KO	7 (10)	Oct 30, 1973	Twin Rinks, Cheektowaga, New York, U.S.	
89	Win	69–18–2	Tony Ventura	TKO	3 (10)	Sep 25, 1973	Twin Rinks, Cheektowaga, New York, U.S.	
88	Win	68–18–2	Charlie Boston	KO	2	Sep 5, 1972	Port-au-Prince, Haiti	
87	Win	67–18–2	Tommy Burns	KO	1 (12)	Aug 10, 1972	Nelson, British Columbia, Canada	Retained Canadian heavyweight title
86	Loss	66–18–2	Muhammad Ali	UD	12	May 1, 1972	Pacific Coliseum, Vancouver, British Columbia, Canada	For NABF heavyweight title
85	Win	66–17–2	Jim Christopher	KO	2 (10)	Feb 21, 1972	Winnipeg Arena, Winnipeg, Manitoba, Canada	
84	Win	65–17–2	Charley Chase	TKO	6 (12)	Jan 28, 1972	Pacific Coliseum, Vancouver, British Columbia, Canada	Retained Canadian heavyweight title
83	Win	64–17–2	Cleveland Williams	UD	10	Nov 17, 1971	Astrodome, Houston, Texas, U.S.	
82	Loss	63–17–2	Jimmy Ellis	UD	10	May 10, 1971	Maple Leaf Gardens, Toronto, Canada	
81	Win	63–16–2	Charles Couture	KO	2 (10)	Dec 11, 1970	Austintown Fitch High School Gym, Youngstown, Ohio, U.S.	
80	Win	62–16–2	Tony Ventura	TKO	4 (10)	Nov 5, 1970	Forum, Montreal, Quebec, Canada	
79	Win	61–16–2	Tommy Burns	KO	1 (12)	Oct 24, 1970	Hamilton, Ontario, Canada	
78	Win	60–16–2	Mike Bruce	KO	2 (10)	Aug 15, 1970	Kosevo Stadium, Sarajevo, Yugoslavia	
77	Loss	59–16–2	George Foreman	TKO	3 (10)	Aug 4, 1970	Madison Square Garden, New York City, New York, U.S.	
76	Win	59–15–2	Charlie Reno	KO	3 (10)	Jun 30, 1970	Seattle, Washington, D.C., U.S.	
75	Win	58–15–2	Gino Ricci	TKO	1 (10)	May 10, 1970	Kimberley, British Columbia, Canada	
74	Win	57–15–2	Willie Tiger	KO	10 (10)	May 1, 1970	Fairgrounds, Detroit, Michigan, U.S.	
73	Win	56–15–2	Jerry Quarry	KO	7 (10)	Dec 12, 1969	Madison Square Garden, New York City, New York, U.S.	
72	Win	55–15–2	Leslie Borden	TKO	3 (10)	Nov 16, 1969	Kimberley, British Columbia, Canada	
71	Win	54–15–2	Stamford Harris	TKO	3 (12)	Sep 8, 1969	Exhibition Pavilion, Lethbridge, Alberta, Canada	
70	Loss	53–15–2	Buster Mathis	UD	12	Feb 3, 1969	Madison Square Garden, New York City, New York, U.S.	
69	Win	53–14–2	Dante Cane	TKO	7 (10)	Nov 12, 1968	Maple Leaf Gardens, Toronto, Canada	
68	Win	52–14–2	Manuel Ramos	TKO	5 (10)	Sep 26, 1968	Madison Square Garden, New York City, New York, U.S.	
67	Win	51–14–2	Vic Brown	TKO	3 (10)	Sep 17, 1968	Maple Leaf Gardens, Toronto, Canada	
66	Win	50–14–2	Levi Forte	TKO	2 (10)	Sep 3, 1968	Auditorium, Miami Beach, Florida, U.S.	
65	Win	49–14–2	Johnny Featherman	KO	1 (12)	Jun 30, 1968	Penticton, British Columbia, Canada	
64	Win	48–14–2	Jean-Claude Roy	UD	12	Jun 5, 1968	Exhibition Stadium, Regina, Saskatchewan, Canada	Won Canadian heavyweight title
63	Loss	47–14–2	Joe Frazier	TKO	4 (10)	Jul 19, 1967	Madison Square Garden, New York City, New York, U.S.	
62	Win	47–13–2	Archie Ray	TKO	2 (10)	Jun 22, 1967	Adams Field House, Missoula, Montana, U.S.	
61	Win	46–13–2	Willi Besmanoff	TKO	3 (10)	May 27, 1967	Cocoa, Florida, U.S.	
60	Win	45–13–2	Willi Besmanoff	TKO	3 (10)	Apr 4, 1967	Auditorium, Miami Beach, Florida, U.S.	
59	Win	44–13–2	Buddy Moore	KO	2 (10)	Mar 20, 1967	Four Seasons Arena, Walpole, Massachusetts, U.S.	
58	Win	43–13–2	Dick Wipperman	TKO	3 (10)	Feb 22, 1967	Armory, Akron, Ohio, U.S.	
57	Win	42–13–2	Vic Brown	KO	4 (10)	Jan 16, 1967	Four Seasons Arena, Walpole, Massachusetts, U.S.	
56	Win	41–13–2	Willie McCormick	KO	3 (10)	Dec 16, 1966	Labrador City, Newfoundland and Labrador, Canada	
55	Win	40–13–2	Dave Russell	TKO	2 (10)	Nov 28, 1966	Saint John, New Brunswick, Canada	
54	Win	39–13–2	Boston Jacobs	TKO	3 (10)	Nov 21, 1966	Cobo Arena, Detroit, Michigan, U.S.	
53	Win	38–13–2	Dick Wipperman	TKO	5 (10)	Oct 12, 1966	Paul Sauvé Arena, Montreal, Quebec, Canada	
52	Win	37–13–2	Bob Avery	TKO	2 (15)	Sep 15, 1966	Edmonton, Alberta, Canada	
51	Win	36–13–2	Mel Turnbow	KO	7 (10)	Aug 16, 1966	Paul Sauvé Arena, Montreal, Quebec, Canada	
50	Loss	35–13–2	Oscar Bonavena	MD	12	Jun 23, 1966	Madison Square Garden, New York City, New York, U.S.	
49	Win	35–12–2	Levi Forte	TKO	2 (10)	May 15, 1966	Miner's Forum, Glace Bay, Nova Scotia, Canada	
48	Loss	34–12–2	Muhammad Ali	UD	15	Mar 29, 1966	Maple Leaf Gardens, Toronto, Canada	For WBC, NYSAC, and The Ring heavyweight titles
47	Loss	34–11–2	Eduardo Corletti	PTS	10	Jan 25, 1966	Olympia, London, England	
46	Win	34–10–2	Joe Bygraves	PTS	10	Dec 7, 1965	Royal Albert Hall, London, England	
45	Loss	33–10–2	Ernie Terrell	UD	15	Nov 1, 1965	Maple Leaf Gardens, Toronto, Canada	For WBA heavyweight title
44	Win	33–9–2	Orvin Veazey	KO	2 (10)	Aug 17, 1965	Exhibition Stadium, Regina, Saskatchewan, Canada	
43	Win	32–9–2	Dave Bailey	KO	3 (10)	Jun 30, 1965	Exhibition Stadium, Regina, Saskatchewan, Canada	
42	Win	31–9–2	Ed Sonny Andrews	TKO	1 (10)	Jun 7, 1965	Saint John, New Brunswick, Canada	
41	Win	30–9–2	Bill Nielsen	TKO	8 (10)	Apr 19, 1965	Maple Leaf Gardens, Toronto, Canada	
40	Loss	29–9–2	Floyd Patterson	UD	12	Feb 1, 1965	Madison Square Garden, New York City, New York, U.S.	
39	Win	29–8–2	Calvin Butler	KO	3 (10)	Nov 10, 1964	Hull, Quebec, Canada	
38	Win	28–8–2	Doug Jones	TKO	11 (12)	Oct 2, 1964	Madison Square Garden, New York City, New York, U.S.	
37	Win	27–8–2	Don Prout	TKO	3 (10)	Jul 27, 1964	Sargent Field, New Bedford, Massachusetts, U.S.	
36	Win	26–8–2	Hugh Mercier	KO	1 (12)	Mar 18, 1964	Regina, Saskatchewan, Canada	Won vacant Canadian heavyweight title
35	Loss	25–8–2	Zora Folley	UD	10	Jan 17, 1964	Cleveland Arena, Cleveland, Ohio, U.S.	
34	Draw	25–7–2	Tony Alongi	PTS	10	Nov 8, 1963	Miami Beach, Florida, U.S.	Originally a decision win for Algoni, result was changed to a draw after an error with the scoring
33	Win	25–7–1	Mike DeJohn	MD	10	Sep 27, 1963	Louisville Gardens, Louisville, Kentucky, U.S.	
32	Win	24–7–1	Lloyd Washington	KO	2 (10)	May 18, 1963	Central High Field House, Battle Creek, Michigan, U.S.	
31	Win	23–7–1	Chico Gardner	KO	4 (10)	Apr 29, 1963	London, Ontario, Canada	
30	Win	22–7–1	James Wakefield	TKO	6 (10)	Apr 22, 1963	Windsor Arena, Windsor, Ontario, Canada	
29	Win	21–7–1	Rico Brooks	TKO	2 (10)	Mar 15, 1963	Detroit, Michigan, U.S.	
28	Loss	20–7–1	Joe Erskine	DQ	5 (12)	Oct 2, 1961	Toronto, Ontario, Canada	Chuvalo was disqualified for headbutting
27	Loss	20–6–1	Bob Cleroux	SD	12	Aug 8, 1961	Delormier Stadium, Montreal, Quebec, Canada	Lost Canadian heavyweight title
26	Win	20–5–1	Willi Besmanoff	TKO	4 (10)	Jun 27, 1961	Maple Leaf Gardens, Toronto, Canada	
25	Win	19–5–1	Alex Miteff	SD	10	Mar 27, 1961	Maple Leaf Gardens, Toronto, Canada	
24	Win	18–5–1	Bob Cleroux	UD	12	Nov 23, 1960	Forum, Quebec, Canada	Won Canadian heavyweight title
23	Loss	17–5–1	Bob Cleroux	SD	12	Aug 17, 1960	Delormier Stadium, Montreal, Quebec, Canada	Lost Canadian heavyweight title
22	Loss	17–4–1	Pete Rademacher	UD	10	Jul 19, 1960	Maple Leaf Gardens, Toronto, Canada	
21	Win	17–3–1	Yvon Durelle	KO	12 (12)	Nov 17, 1959	Maple Leaf Gardens, Toronto, Canada	Retained Canadian heavyweight title
20	Win	16–3–1	Frankie Daniels	TKO	7 (10)	Sep 14, 1959	Maple Leaf Gardens, Toronto, Canada	
19	Loss	15–3–1	Pat McMurtry	UD	10	Oct 17, 1958	Madison Square Garden, New York City, New York, U.S.	
18	Win	15–2–1	James J. Parker	KO	1 (12)	Sep 15, 1959	Maple Leaf Gardens, Toronto, Canada	Won vacant Canadian heavyweight title
17	Draw	14–2–1	Alex Miteff	PTS	10	Jun 16, 1958	Maple Leaf Gardens, Toronto, Canada	
16	Win	14–2	Howard King	KO	2 (10)	Apr 21, 1958	Toronto, Ontario, Canada	
15	Win	13–2	Julio Mederos	UD	10	Jan 27, 1958	Maple Leaf Gardens, Toronto, Canada	
14	Loss	12–2	Bob Baker	UD	10	Sep 9, 1957	Maple Leaf Gardens, Toronto, Canada	
13	Win	12–1	Joe Schmolze	KO	4 (10)	Jun 6, 1957	Fort William, Ontario, Canada	
12	Win	11–1	Emil Brtko	TKO	2 (10)	Apr 22, 1957	Toronto, Ontario, Canada	
11	Win	10–1	Moses Graham	KO	2 (8)	Mar 25, 1957	Maple Leaf Gardens, Toronto, Canada	
10	Win	9–1	Walter Hafer	KO	3 (8)	Mar 4, 1957	Maple Leaf Gardens, Toronto, Canada	
9	Win	8–1	Sid Russell	KO	1 (8)	Jan 14, 1957	Maple Leaf Gardens, Toronto, Canada	
8	Win	7–1	Bob Biehler	UD	8	Nov 19, 1956	Maple Leaf Gardens, Toronto, Canada	
7	Loss	6–1	Howard King	SD	8	Oct 22, 1956	Toronto, Ontario, Canada	
6	Win	6–0	Joe Evans	KO	1 (8)	Sep 10, 1956	Maple Leaf Gardens, Toronto, Canada	
5	Win	5–0	John Arthur	UD	8	Jun 11, 1956	Maple Leaf Gardens, Toronto, Canada	
4	Win	4–0	Ed McGee	KO	1 (3)	Apr 23, 1956	Toronto, Ontario, Canada	Jack Dempsey Heavyweight Novice Tournament
3	Win	3–0	Ross Gregory	KO	1 (3)	Apr 23, 1956	Toronto, Ontario, Canada	Jack Dempsey Heavyweight Novice Tournament
2	Win	2–0	Jim Leonard	KO	2 (3)	Apr 23, 1956	Toronto, Ontario, Canada	Jack Dempsey Heavyweight Novice Tournament
1	Win	1–0	Gordon Baldwin	TKO	2	Apr 23, 1956	Toronto, Ontario, Canada	Jack Dempsey Heavyweight Novice Tournament

== Sources ==
- Chuvalo, George (November 2013). "Lost Boys". Toronto Life Magazine.
