= Len Wadsworth =

Canadian boxer

Personal information
- Nationality: (Canada) Canadian
- Born: Leonard William Wadsworth Haileybury, Ontario, Canada
- Height: 6 ft 0 in (183cm)
- Weight: Middleweight

Boxing career
- Reach: 72½ in (184.15 cm)
- Stance: Orthodox

Boxing record
- Total fights: 54
- Wins: 31
- Win by KO: 18
- Losses: 19
- Draws: 4
Medal record
Boxing
Representing Canada
British Empire Games
Silver medal – second place	1934 London	middleweight

Len Wadsworth (fl. 1930s–1940s) was a Canadian professional middleweight boxer who held the Canadian middleweight boxing title from 1938 to 1947.

== Early life ==
Leonard William Wadsworth was born around 1915 in Haileybury, Ontario, Canada.

== Amateur boxing career ==
In April 1934, he competed in the Ontario Amateur Boxing Championships in the middleweight division. The 160-pound titleholder soon participated in the Canadian trials for the 1934 British Empire Games that July. Wadsworth secured a silver medal at the second ever British Empire Games (now Commonwealth Games) after losing to England's Alf Shawyer by split decision at the Wembley Stadium in August 1934.

== Professional career ==
Once back in Canada, he began his professional career in Ontario. Starting in 1935, he scored four straight wins before a loss to Jackie Flowers at Broadway Auditorium in 1937.

=== Taking the Canadian middleweight championship, February 1938 ===
After collecting three knockouts, Len Wadsworth knocked out Irvin Pease in the seventh round to win his first Canadian middleweight title on February 28, 1938.

Wadsworth, the Canadian middleweight champion, lost a non-title bout to Saint John middleweight Ray McIntyre in Toronto on April 11, 1938.

=== Losing the Canadian middleweight championship to Ray McIntyre, May 1938 ===
He then put his Canadian middleweight championship at stake on May 20, 1938, in Ottawa. Over 2,500 people filled the Ottawa Auditorium. He lost the title to McIntyre via twelve-round decision.

=== Reclaiming the Canadian middleweight championship from Ray McIntyre, August 1938 ===
Wadsworth regained the middleweight title from rival Ray McIntyre by winning a 10-round decision in Timmins on August 18, 1938. The bout was officiated by Phil Zwick, who credited Wadsworth with 7 of the 10 rounds.

Wadsworth lost a unanimous decision to McIntyre on June 13, 1939, in Saint John, New Brunswick. The bout, scheduled for ten rounds, was not a title fight as both men exceeded the weight limit. Wadsworth was knocked down in the seventh round but recovered to finish the match.

==== Notable bouts during middleweight title reign ====
On October 6, 1939, in Timmins, Wadsworth defended the Canadian middleweight title with a hard-fought ten-round decision win over Ray McIntyre. The reigning titleholder maintained complete control throughout the match, sending his opponent to the canvas twelve times before the fight ended.

His second defense of the Canadian middleweight title came on March 4, 1940, when he faced Frankie Genovese at Maple Leaf Gardens. Wadsworth and Genovese fought to a draw in their first meeting. The two boxers battled to another stalemate at the McIntyre Arena on March 15, 1840. He lost to Genovese in a non-title bout on May 12, 1941.

By 1943, he was under the management of Maurice Foreman. Wadsworth made his first title defense in front of Montreal fight fans against Wilfie Shanks in March 1943. He successfully defended his championship for the second time just two weeks later, stopping Al Evans by 10th-round TKO.

Wadsworth enlisted in the Canadian Army as a trooper while holding the Canadian middleweight title. He participated in the Canadian Army Boxing Tournament held in Ottawa in May 1944. He was discharged from the army by 1945.

Facing undisputed world middleweight champion Tony Zale in Wichita, Kansas in February 1947, he lost by a third-round knockout. His appearance marked the first time in Wichita boxing history that fans witnessed a nationally known opponent like Wadsworth challenge an active world champion.

=== Losing the Canadian middleweight championship to Roger Whynott, February 1947 ===
He was scheduled to fight Maritime welterweight champion Roger Whynott in Halifax in a title defense on February 28, 1947. After 12 rounds, he lost a disputed decision to Whynott from Mahone Bay, Nova Scotia.

=== Losing the Canadian middleweight championship to Rockabye Ross, August 1948 ===
On May 1, 1948, Len Wadsworth put his title on the line in Glace Bay, facing George "Rock-a-Bye" Ross in a scheduled 12-round contest. Though Wadsworth was defeated by decision, the Canadian Boxing Federation allowed him to keep his Canadian middleweight championship. The Montreal-based federation determined the fight didn't count because the Cape Breton Association wasn't affiliated with the C.B.F. He was still viewed as the reigning middleweight champion in Quebec and Ontario.

His 10-year reign as Canadian middleweight champion officially ended in August 1948 when he was defeated by Rockabye Ross in Halifax, Nova Scotia. The back-to-back fights with Ross marked the end of his boxing career.

== Professional boxing record ==
54 fights	31 wins	19 losses
By knockout	18	3
By decision	13	16
Draws	4	

Achievements
Preceded by Vacant	Canadian Middleweight Champion; February 28, 1938 – May 20, 1938	Succeeded by Ray McIntyre
Preceded by Ray McIntyre	Canadian Middleweight Champion; August 18, 1938 – February 28, 1947	Succeeded by Roger Whynott
