= Jim McCarter =

American boxer

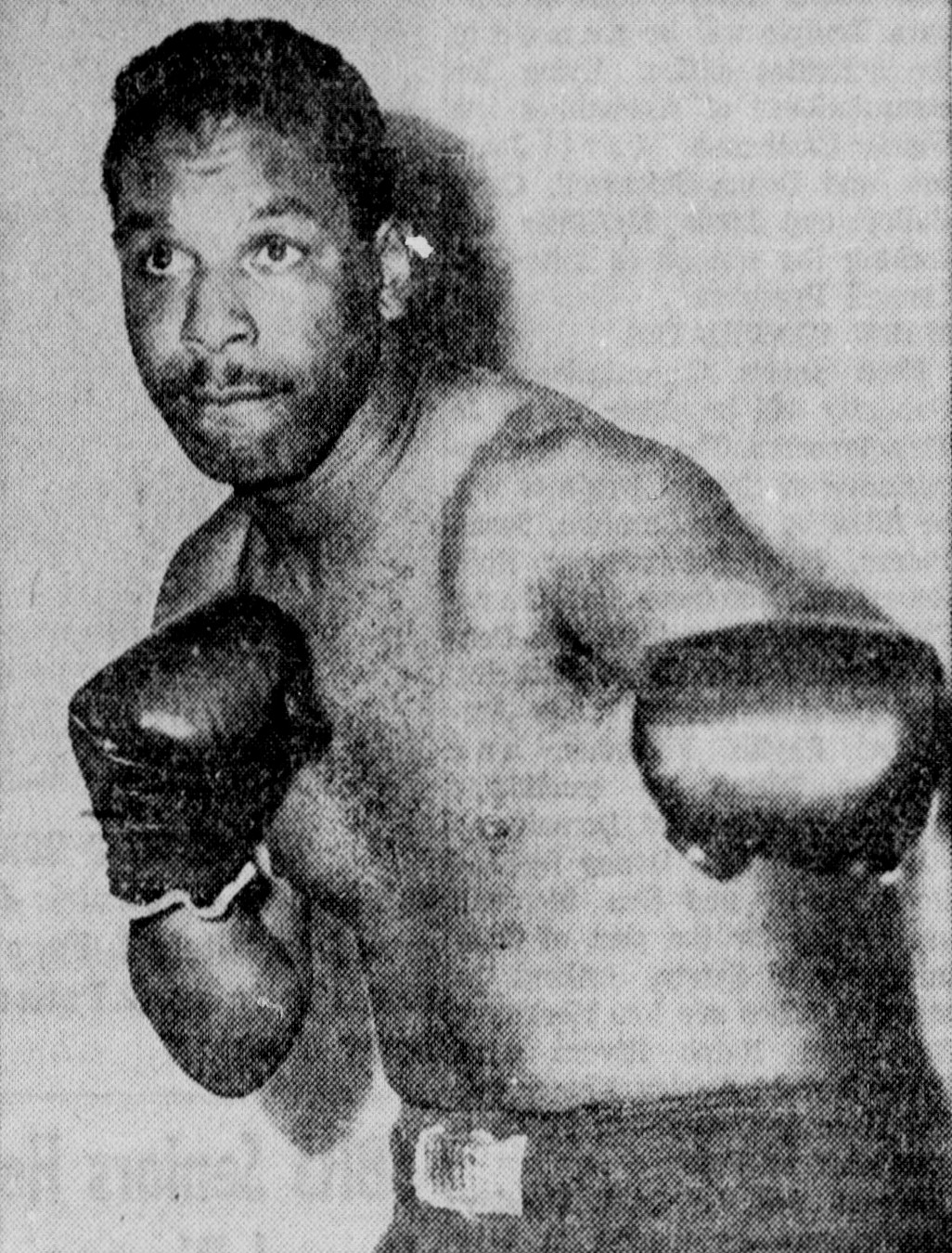
McCarter, circa 1960

Jim McCarter (born March 30, 1936, in Chester, Pennsylvania) was an American professional boxer.

== Background ==
McCarter was a fullback for the University of Washington football team.

== Amateur career ==
McCarter fought out of the Lloyd Athletic Club and won the Diamond Belt in Philadelphia and went on to win the National AAU Heavyweight Championship in 1956, reportedly with a decision vs. Sonny Liston.

== Pro career ==
McCarter turned pro in 1959 and enjoyed far less success than as an amateur. Fighting mostly journeymen, McCarter's pro career was largely over by 1961. He continued to fight sporadically over the next several years without winning a bout, and finally retired in 1973.

Preceded by George Moore	National AAU Heavyweight Champion; 1956	Succeeded by Lee Williams

== Professional boxing record ==
9 Wins (5 knockouts, 4 decisions), 8 Losses (3 knockouts, 5 decisions), 2 Draws
Result	Record	Opponent	Type	Round	Date	Location	Notes
Loss	25-4	(Puerto Rico) Pedro Agosto	KO	2	14/06/1973	Roberto Clemente Coliseum, San Juan, Puerto Rico	
Loss	3-0-1	(United States) Donnie Ray Sherman	PTS	6	20/05/1968	(United States) Philadelphia Arena, Philadelphia, Pennsylvania	
Loss	--	(United States) Walter Sterling	KO	2	10/01/1968	(United States) Oakland Auditorium Arena, Oakland, California	
Loss	14-4-2	(United States) Greatest Crawford	PTS	6	10/07/1964	(United States) Madison Square Garden, New York City	
Draw	14-8-2	(United States) David E. Bailey	PTS	6	26/03/1963	(United States) Allentown, Pennsylvania	
Loss	23-10-1	(Argentina) Alex Miteff	KO	3	31/08/1961	(United States) Olympic Auditorium, Los Angeles, California	McCarter knocked out at 1:48 of the third round.
Win	7-3-2	(United States) Dave Furch	UD	10	22/06/1961	(United States) Olympic Auditorium, Los Angeles, California	8-5, 5-3, 9-4.
Win	14-6-2	(United States) Floyd Joyner	SD	10	20/04/1961	(United States) Olympic Auditorium, Los Angeles, California	5-4, 8-4, 5-6.
Loss	42-23-7	(Germany) Willi Besmanoff	UD	10	18/10/1960	(United States) Seattle Civic Auditorium, Seattle, Washington	
Loss	6-10-4	(United States) Otis Fuller	UD	10	14/06/1960	(United States) Olympic Auditorium, Los Angeles, California	93-97, 93-95, 91-96.
Draw	6-10-3	(United States) Otis Fuller	PTS	10	03/05/1960	(United States) Olympic Auditorium, Los Angeles, California	95-95, 93-95, 97-96.
Win	3-3-1	(United States) Eddie Jackson	RTD	5	12/04/1960	(United States) Olympic Auditorium, Los Angeles, California	
Win	15-12-6	(United States) Yancy D Smith	TKO	1	01/03/1960	(United States) Olympic Auditorium, Los Angeles, California	Referee stopped the bout at 2:44 of the first round.
Win	14-9-1	(United States) Duke Sabedong	MD	10	26/01/1960	(United States) Olympic Auditorium, Los Angeles, California	95-95, 98-94, 97-94.
Win	6-10-1	(United States) Anthony Emanuel	KO	2	22/12/1959	(United States) Olympic Auditorium, Los Angeles, California	
Loss	7-7-2	(United States) Jack Jarrod	SD	6	14/11/1959	(United States) Olympic Auditorium, Los Angeles, California	
Win	2-6-1	(United States) Andy Isaacs	PTS	4	10/10/1959	(United States) Olympic Auditorium, Los Angeles, California	
Win	2-3	(United States) Herbert Hair	KO	3	29/05/1959	(United States) Legion Stadium, Hollywood, California	
Win	0-1-1	(United States) Bob Mumford	KO	4	16/04/1959	(United States) Olympic Auditorium, Los Angeles, California	
