= Yvon Durelle =

Canadian boxer (1929–2007)

Personal information
- Nickname: The Fighting Fisherman
- Born: October 14, 1929 Baie-Sainte-Anne, New Brunswick, Canada
- Died: January 6, 2007 (aged 77) Moncton, New Brunswick, Canada
- Height: 5 ft 9 1/2 in (1.77 m)
- Weight: Middleweight; Light Heavyweight; Heavyweight

Boxing career
- Reach: 70 in (178 cm)
- Stance: Orthodox

Boxing record
- Total fights: 115
- Wins: 88
- Win by KO: 49
- Losses: 24
- Draws: 2
- No contests: 1

Yvon Durelle (October 14, 1929 – January 6, 2007), was a Canadian champion boxer. He was of Acadian descent.

== Early life ==
Durelle grew up in a family of fourteen children, in Baie-Ste-Anne, a small Acadian fishing village on Miramichi Bay on the Atlantic coast. Like many others of his generation, he left school at an early age to work on a fishing boat. In his spare time, Durelle liked to box and while still working in the fishery, he began prize fighting on weekends. Durelle's brother, Joey, was also a professional fighter.

== Career ==
Billed as The Fighting Fisherman, Durelle began his professional career in 1948, boxing at various venues around the province of New Brunswick. By August 1950, Yvon showed only one defeat in twenty three starts, the lone blemish a loss by disqualification, to Billy Snowball. Over time he was gaining a reputation as a tough opponent with a hard punch. A large fan following in Chatham, one in Newcastle and as well in Fredericton resulted in a groundswell of popularity as his victories eventually made him one of the top ranked middleweight fighters in Canada.

=== Light Heavyweight ===
In May 1953, Durelle won the Canadian middleweight championship. He defended his title, winning 8 straight bouts. He moved up in weight class to fight in the light heavyweight division.

In his first fight against a heavier and stronger opponent, he defeated the Canadian champion to take the light-heavyweight title. The following year, he fought outside his native Canada for the first time, going to Brooklyn, New York to fight Floyd Patterson, an up-and-coming American Golden Gloves champion. Outpointed in 8 rounds by the man who soon became the heavyweight champion of the world, Durelle's strong performance in a losing cause against Patterson gained him wide respect in the international boxing world.

In New York City in March 1957, Durelle broke into the top ten world rankings with a 10-round decision over Angelo Defendis. In May he won the British Empire light-heavyweight championship and the following month fought the top-ranked contender in the world, Tony Anthony. In a fight most experts say he won handily, Durelle was given only a draw against the heavily favored Anthony but it elevated him to the number 3 ranking in the world. He became a much talked about sports personality in his native country after he beat the German champion, Willi Besmanoff. In 1958, he defeated Clarence Hinnant, regarded by many as one of the best all around boxers of the time. The victory provided Durelle with the opportunity for his first chance to fight for a world title.

==== Title Fight ====
Durelle's light-heavyweight championship fight against the great Archie Moore on December 10, 1958, at the Forum in Montreal, Quebec, is one of the most memorable fights in boxing history. Listed as a 4-to-1 underdog, Durelle became a legend in Canada after the bout. In one of the first fights broadcast coast-to-coast on American television, Durelle stunned boxing patrons by knocking the champion down 3 times in the first round. Under boxing rules today (except those of the World Boxing Council), the fight would have been stopped after three knockdowns in one round and Durelle would have been world champion. Also, he missed an opportunity when, after the first knockdown, he stood over Moore watching for several seconds before returning to his corner. As a result of his delay, the referee had to wait to begin the count, and Moore made it to his feet at the count of nine. Durelle would have likely won if he had gone to his corner. Durelle swarmed all over the champion for four more rounds and knocked him to the canvas again in round five but Moore held on and eventually wore Durelle down to retain his world championship with a punishing eleventh-round knockout. The fight was the talk of the boxing world and members of the Canadian press voted it the sporting event of the year. In an interview in 1994, Archie Moore, upon recounting the fight still hailed as classic, had this to say: "As the fight wore on and I got stronger, I thought to myself that this fella was the toughest man I'd ever fought. I turned professional in 1936 and fought until 1965--229 bouts. And I still think Durelle was the toughest man I ever faced."

=== From Boxing to Wrestling and back ===
Six months later, in June 1959, at Durelle's home village of Baie-Ste-Anne, thirty-five fishermen died 1959 Escuminac disaster when they were swept out to sea by 40-foot tidal waves that pounded the wharf. Distraught at the loss of friends and relatives, in August he lost in a world title fight rematch with Archie Moore by a third-round knockout. In November of that year he lost in 12 rounds to the Canadian heavyweight champion, George Chuvalo. Durelle fought only a few more times, before taking up professional wrestling in 1961. He returned to boxing in 1963 winning twice more before retiring permanently. He continued to earn a living at wrestling, primarily in eastern Canada but on occasion with Stu Hart's Stampede Wrestling, in Calgary, Alberta. He would retire from wrestling in 1973.

== Later life and death ==
Despite his size and brutal profession, Durelle is often referred to as a modest and gentle man (his nickname was "doux", meaning "soft"). However, in the 1970s an event profoundly impacted him and his family when, in a bar that he owned and operated, he shot and killed a man who had attacked him. Charged with murder, he was defended by a young lawyer by the name of Frank McKenna and was acquitted on the grounds of self-defence. The trial received massive and sustained publicity and McKenna eventually went into politics and was elected premier of the province of New Brunswick.

Retired in his native village, a small museum with souvenirs of his twenty-year boxing career was built attached to his home where he and his wife of more than fifty years greeted fans who still showed up to see the New Brunswick boxer. In an article for ESPN.com about the most memorable matches in boxing history, veteran ring referee Mills Lane said: "I don't think you'll ever see a fight like Durelle-Moore again...That fight transcended what great fights are."

Durelle incurred a stroke on December 25, 2006, and died at age 77 on January 6, 2007, at the Moncton Hospital in Moncton, New Brunswick. He also had Parkinson's disease prior to this. His funeral was held on January 11, 2007, from Ste-Anne Roman Catholic Church in Baie-Ste-Anne, New Brunswick.

== Professional boxing record ==
87 Wins (48 Knockouts), 24 Losses (9 Knockouts), 2 Draws, 1 No Contest
Result	Record	Opponent	Type	Round	Date	Location	Notes
Loss	87-24-2	(Canada) Jean-Claude Roy	PTS	8	06/12/1964	(Canada) Montmagny, Quebec	
Win	87-23-2	(Canada) Phonse LaSaga	TKO	1	24/03/1963	(Canada) Trois-Rivieres, Quebec	
Win	86-23-2	(Canada) Cecil Gray	KO	7	25/02/1963	(Canada) Paul Sauve Arena, Montreal, Quebec	
Loss	85-23-2	(United States) Paul Wright	PTS	10	15/09/1960	(Canada) Moncton, New Brunswick	
Win	85-22-2	John Armstrong	KO	4	22/06/1960	(Canada) Woodstock, New Brunswick	
Win	84-22-2	(United States) Ray Batey	DQ	9	15/06/1960	(Canada) Chatham, New Brunswick	
Win	83-22-2	Emile Dupre	TKO	3	26/05/1960	(United States) Brewer, Maine	
Loss	82-22-2	(Canada) George Chuvalo	KO	12	17/11/1959	(Canada) Maple Leaf Gardens, Toronto, Ontario	Canada Heavyweight Title
Win	82-21-2	(United States) Young Beau Jack	TKO	9	23/10/1959	(Canada) Moncton, New Brunswick	
Win	81-21-2	(United States) Charlie Jones	UD	10	28/09/1959	(Canada) Exhibition Grounds, Quebec City, Quebec	
Win	80-21-2	(United States) Al Anderson	KO	4	15/09/1959	(Canada) Chatham, New Brunswick	
Loss	79-21-2	(United States) Archie Moore	KO	3	12/08/1959	(Canada) Montreal Forum, Montreal, Quebec	NYSAC/NBA World Light Heavyweight Titles.
Win	79-20-2	(United States) Teddy Burns	TKO	3	12/05/1959	(United States) General Carter State Armory, Caribou, Maine	
Loss	78-20-2	(United States) Archie Moore	KO	11	10/12/1958	(Canada) Montreal Forum, Montreal, Quebec	World Light Heavyweight Title.
Win	78-19-2	(United States) Louis Jones	KO	2	02/10/1958	(Canada) Moncton, New Brunswick	
Win	77-19-2	(United States) Freddie Mack	PTS	10	28/08/1958	(Canada) Moncton, New Brunswick	
Win	76-19-2	(South Africa) Mike Holt	RTD	8	16/07/1958	(Canada) Montreal Forum, Montreal, Quebec	Commonwealth Light Heavyweight Title.
Win	75-19-2	(France) Germinal Ballarin	UD	10	21/05/1958	(Canada) Montreal Forum, Montreal, Quebec	
Loss	74-19-2	(United States) Tony E. Anthony	TKO	7	14/03/1958	(United States) Madison Square Garden, New York City	
Win	74-18-2	(United States) Clarence Hinnant	TKO	6	31/01/1958	(United States) Madison Square Garden, New York City	
Win	73-18-2	(United States) Jerry Luedee	UD	10	11/12/1957	(United States) Fort Homer W. Hesterly Armory, Tampa, Florida	
Win	72-18-2	(Canada) Mario Nini	KO	4	22/11/1957	(Canada) Edmundston, New Brunswick	
Win	71-18-2	(United States) Floyd McCoy	KO	2	07/11/1957	(Canada) Moncton, New Brunswick	
Win	70-18-2	(Germany) Willi Besmanoff	UD	10	25/09/1957	(United States) Olympia Stadium, Detroit, Michigan	
Win	69-18-2	(United States) Tim Jones	TKO	8	29/08/1957	(Canada) Stadium, Moncton, New Brunswick	
Win	68-18-2	(Germany) Guenter Balzer	TKO	8	15/08/1957	(Canada) Chatham, New Brunswick	
Draw	67-18-2	(United States) Tony E. Anthony	PTS	10	14/06/1957	(United States) Olympia Stadium, Detroit, Michigan	
Win	67-18-1	(Canada) Gordon Wallace	KO	2	30/05/1957	(Canada) Moncton, New Brunswick	Commonwealth/Canada Light Heavyweight Titles.
Win	66-18-1	(United States) Leo Johnson	TKO	5	16/05/1957	(Canada) Moncton, New Brunswick	
Win	65-18-1	(United States) Angelo DeFendis	MD	10	22/04/1957	(United States) St. Nicholas Arena, New York City	
Win	64-18-1	(United States) Clarence Floyd	TKO	7	25/03/1957	(United States) St. Nicholas Arena, New York City	
Loss	63-18-1	(United States) Clarence Hinnant	TKO	7	19/02/1957	(United States) Miami Beach Auditorium, Miami Beach, Florida	
Win	63-17-1	(United States) Bobby L. King	KO	1	27/10/1956	(Canada) Fredericton, New Brunswick	
Win	62-17-1	(United States) Chubby Wright	SD	10	04/10/1956	(Canada) Moncton, New Brunswick	
Win	61-17-1	(United States) Gary Garafola	KO	1	20/09/1956	(Canada) Moncton, New Brunswick	
Win	60-17-1	(United States) Wilfred Picot	TKO	4	06/09/1956	(Canada) Lord Beaverbrook Rink, Saint John, New Brunswick	
Win	59-17-1	(United States) Alvin Williams	UD	10	16/08/1956	(Canada) Moncton, New Brunswick	
Win	58-17-1	(United States) Wilfred Picot	TKO	4	19/07/1956	(Canada) Moncton, New Brunswick	
Loss	57-17-1	(United Kingdom) Arthur Howard	PTS	10	19/06/1956	(United Kingdom) Clapton Greyhound Track, Clapton, London	
Win	57-16-1	(United States) Jerome Richardson	PTS	10	20/05/1956	Hamilton, Bermuda	
Loss	56-16-1	(United States) Artie Towne	DQ	7	28/11/1955	(United Kingdom) Nottingham Ice Stadium, Nottingham, Nottinghamshire	
Loss	56-15-1	(Trinidad and Tobago) Yolande Pompey	TKO	7	18/10/1955	(United Kingdom) Harringay Arena, Harringay, London	
Loss	56-14-1	(United States) Jimmy Slade	TKO	8	03/09/1955	(Canada) Glace Bay, Nova Scotia	
Win	56-13-1	(Canada) Billy Fifield	KO	1	28/07/1955	(Canada) Moncton, New Brunswick	Canada Light Heavyweight Title.
Loss	55-13-1	(United States) Floyd Patterson	RTD	5	23/06/1955	(Canada) Newcastle, New Brunswick	
Win	55-12-1	(Puerto Rico) Jimmy J. Garcia	TKO	8	16/06/1955	(Canada) Moncton, New Brunswick	
Loss	54-12-1	(United Kingdom) Ron Barton	DQ	3	24/05/1955	(United Kingdom) Royal Albert Hall, Kensington, London	
Loss	54-11-1	(United States) Art Henri	PTS	12	10/12/1954	(Germany) Sportpalast, Schoeneberg, Berlin	
Loss	54-10-1	(Germany) Gerhard Hecht	UD	10	12/11/1954	(Germany) Sportpalast, Schoeneberg, Berlin	
Win	54-9-1	(Canada) Gordon Wallace	UD	12	27/09/1954	(Canada) Glace Bay, Nova Scotia	Canada Light Heavyweight Title.
Win	53-9-1	(United States) Bob Isler	PTS	10	25/08/1954	(Canada) Newcastle, New Brunswick	
Loss	52-9-1	(United States) Paul Andrews	KO	5	26/07/1954	(United States) St. Nicholas Arena, New York City	
Win	52-8-1	(Canada) Doug Harper	UD	12	07/07/1954	(Canada) Newcastle, New Brunswick	Canada Light Heavyweight Title.
Win	51-8-1	(United States) Jerome Richardson	SD	10	23/06/1954	(Canada) Moncton, New Brunswick	
Win	50-8-1	(United States) Sampson Powell	UD	10	09/06/1954	(Canada) Newcastle, New Brunswick	
Win	49-8-1	(Canada) Charley E. Chase	SD	10	04/06/1954	(Canada) Stadium, Moncton, New Brunswick	
Win	48-8-1	(Canada) Billy Fifield	KO	10	24/05/1954	(Canada) Glace Bay, Nova Scotia	
Loss	47-8-1	(United States) Waddell Hanna	PTS	10	05/05/1954	(Canada) Chatham, New Brunswick	
Loss	47-7-1	(United States) Floyd Patterson	UD	8	15/02/1954	(United States) Boxing From Eastern Parkway, Brooklyn, New York	
Draw	47-6-1	(Canada) Doug Harper	PTS	12	27/01/1954	(Canada) Victoria Pavilion, Calgary, Alberta	Canada Light Heavyweight Title.
Loss	47-6	(Canada) Doug Harper	SD	12	17/11/1953	(Canada) Victoria Pavilion, Calgary, Alberta	Canada Light Heavyweight Title.
Win	47-5	(Canada) Gordon Wallace	UD	12	15/10/1953	(Canada) Moncton, New Brunswick	Canada Light Heavyweight Title.
Win	46-5	(United States) Al Winn	UD	10	30/09/1953	(Canada) Newcastle, New Brunswick	
Win	45-5	(Canada) Melvin Wade	KO	9	24/09/1953	(Canada) Moncton, New Brunswick	
Win	44-5	(Canada) Gordon Wallace	UD	12	07/09/1953	(Canada) Glace Bay, Nova Scotia	Canada Light Heavyweight Title.
Win	43-5	(Cuba) Wilfredo Miro	KO	2	26/08/1953	(Canada) Sinclair Arena, Newcastle, New Brunswick	
Win	42-5	(United States) Curtis Wade	TKO	8	20/08/1953	(Canada) Moncton, New Brunswick	
Win	41-5	(Canada) Archie Hannigan	KO	5	02/08/1953	(Canada) Glace Bay, Nova Scotia	Claim Maritime Light Heavyweight Title.
Win	40-5	(United States) Joey Greco	TKO	4	20/07/1953	(Canada) Chatham, New Brunswick	
Win	39-5	(United States) Curtis Wade	SD	10	25/06/1953	(Canada) Moncton, New Brunswick	
Win	38-5	(Canada) Harry Poulton	SD	12	19/06/1953	(Canada) Memorial Rink, Stellarton, Nova Scotia	Canada Middleweight Title.
Win	37-5	(United States) Tony Amato	KO	6	20/05/1953	(Canada) Chatham, New Brunswick	
Win	36-5	(Canada) George Ross	TKO	12	04/05/1953	(Canada) Glace Bay Forum, Glace Bay, Nova Scotia	Canada Middleweight Title.
Win	35-5	(Canada) Jimmy Nolan	UD	10	09/10/1952	(Canada) Stampede Corral, Calgary, Alberta	
Win	34-5	(United States) Hurley Sanders	UD	10	24/09/1952	(Canada) Chatham, New Brunswick	
Loss	33-5	(United States) Hurley Sanders	UD	10	25/06/1952	(Canada) Chatham, New Brunswick	
Win	33-4	(Canada) Eddie Zastre	UD	10	21/05/1952	(Canada) Chatham, New Brunswick	
Win	32-4	(Canada) Cobey McCluskey	TKO	6	12/07/1951	(Canada) Moncton, New Brunswick	
Win	31-4	(Canada) Arnold Fleiger	KO	2	20/06/1951	(Canada) Chatham, New Brunswick	
NC	31-4	(Canada) Cobey McCluskey	NC	9	05/06/1951	(Canada) Charlottetown, Prince Edward Island	
Win	30-4	(United States) Bob Stecher	SD	10	23/05/1951	(Canada) Chatham, New Brunswick	
Win	29-4	(Canada) Tiger Warrington	PTS	10	10/12/1950	(Canada) Yarmouth, Nova Scotia	
Win	28-4	(Canada) Alvin Upshaw	KO	7	05/11/1950	(Canada) Yarmouth, Nova Scotia	
Loss	27-4	(Canada) Cobey McCluskey	UD	10	22/10/1950	(Canada) Springhill, Nova Scotia	
Win	27-3	(United States) Al Couture	TKO	6	25/08/1950	(Canada) Chatham, New Brunswick	
Win	26-3	(Canada) Ossie Farrell	KO	1	19/08/1950	(Canada) Moncton, New Brunswick	
Loss	25-3	(Canada) Cobey McCluskey	UD	10	14/08/1950	(Canada) Charlottetown, Prince Edward Island	
Win	25-2	(Canada) Tiger Warrington	UD	10	01/07/1950	(Canada) Moncton, New Brunswick	
Win	24-2	Coot O'Rea	KO	2	18/06/1950	(Canada) Bathurst, New Brunswick	
Win	23-2	(Canada) Alvin Upshaw	TKO	7	23/05/1950	(Canada) Chatham, New Brunswick	
Loss	22-2	(Canada) Roy Wouters	PTS	10	20/01/1950	(Canada) Halifax, Nova Scotia	
Win	22-1	Eddie Hamilton	TKO	3	25/11/1949	(Canada) Chatham, New Brunswick	
Win	21-1	(United States) Bob Stecher	UD	10	11/11/1949	(Canada) Chatham, New Brunswick	
Win	20-1	(United States) Ossie Farrell	KO	1	26/10/1949	(Canada) Chatham, New Brunswick	Eastern Canada Middleweight Title.
Win	19-1	(United States) Bernard McCluskey	KO	5	12/10/1949	(Canada) Chatham, New Brunswick	Eastern Canada Middleweight Title.
Win	18-1	Pat Davis	KO	2	18/09/1949	(Canada) Newcastle, New Brunswick	
Win	17-1	(Canada) Bill McLaughlin	PTS	8	26/08/1949	(Canada) Fredericton, New Brunswick	
Win	16-1	(United States) Kid Wolfe	PTS	10	07/08/1949	(Canada) Chatham, New Brunswick	
Win	15-1	(Canada) Billy Landry	PTS	8	20/07/1949	(Canada) Chatham, New Brunswick	
Win	14-1	(Canada) Cobey McCluskey	PTS	8	15/07/1949	(Canada) Newcastle, New Brunswick	
Win	13-1	(Canada) Jimmy Mooney	UD	8	06/07/1949	(Canada) Chatham, New Brunswick	New Brunswick Middleweight Title.
Win	12-1	(Canada) Cobey McCluskey	PTS	8	12/06/1949	(Canada) Baie-Sainte-Anne, New Brunswick	
Win	11-1	Joe Tyne	KO	1	30/05/1949	(Canada) Chatham, New Brunswick	
Win	10-1	Manuel Leek	KO	6	17/05/1949	(Canada) Fredericton, New Brunswick	
Win	9-1	(Canada) Harry Poulton	PTS	8	20/04/1949	(Canada) Newcastle, New Brunswick	
Win	8-1	(Canada) Harry Poulton	PTS	6	23/03/1949	(Canada) Newcastle, New Brunswick	
Win	7-1	(Canada) Crosley Irvine	TKO	3	25/02/1949	(Canada) Chatham, New Brunswick	
Win	6-1	Al Batten	KO	5	02/02/1949	(Canada) Newcastle, New Brunswick	
Loss	5-1	(Canada) Billy Snowball	DQ	4	07/12/1948	(Canada) Tracadie, New Brunswick	
Win	5-0	Al Batten	PTS	8	03/12/1948	(Canada) Baie-Sainte-Anne, New Brunswick	
Win	4-0	(Canada) Percy R. Richardson	PTS	4	11/11/1948	(Canada) Chatham, New Brunswick	
Win	3-0	Al Fraser	PTS	4	13/09/1948	(Canada) Chatham, New Brunswick	
Win	2-0	Al Fraser	PTS	4	25/08/1948	(Canada) Chatham, New Brunswick	
Win	1-0	Sonny Ramsay	KO	2	28/07/1948	(Canada) Chatham, New Brunswick	

== Related works ==
- Yvon Durelle's biography, The Fighting Fisherman: The Life of Yvon Durelle by author Raymond Fraser (Doubleday, ISBN 0-385-15863-7), published in 1981, republished in 2005.
- In 2003, Ginette Pellerin of the National Film Board of Canada made a French film documentary on his life called Durelle.

== Awards and recognition ==
- Inducted into the New Brunswick Sports Hall of Fame in 1971
- Inducted into the Canadian Sports Hall of Fame in 1975
- Inducted into the Canadian Boxing Hall of Fame in 1989

Achievements
Preceded by Gordon Wallace	Commonwealth Light Heavyweight Champion; May 30, 1957 - 1958; Vacated	Vacant Title next held by Chic Calderwood
