= The Last Round: Chuvalo vs. Ali =

2003 Canadian documentary film

- Directed by: Joseph Blasioli
- Written by: Stephen Brunt
- Produced by: Silva Basmajian
- Narrated by: Colin Linden
- Cinematography: Michael Ellis
- Edited by: Craig Bateman
- Music by: Allan Kane
- Production company: National Film Board of Canada
- Distributed by: Koch Vision
- Release date: May 3, 2003 (Hot Docs)
- Running time: 100 minutes
- Country: Canada
- Language: English

The Last Round: Chuvalo vs. Ali is a 2003 Canadian documentary film, directed by Joseph Blasioli. The film centres on the 1966 boxing match at Maple Leaf Gardens between Canadian boxer George Chuvalo and world champion Muhammad Ali.

An excerpt from the film was screened at the SkyDome before a Toronto Argonauts game on October 20, 2002, with both Chuvalo and Ali in attendance. The full film premiered on May 3, 2003, at the Hot Docs Canadian International Documentary Festival, where Blasioli won a special jury award from the Best Canadian Documentary jury.

The film was a Genie Award nominee for Best Feature Length Documentary at the 24th Genie Awards in 2004. It was subsequently broadcast by CBC Television on August 30, 2004.
