= Roy Harris (boxer) =

American boxer (1933–2023)

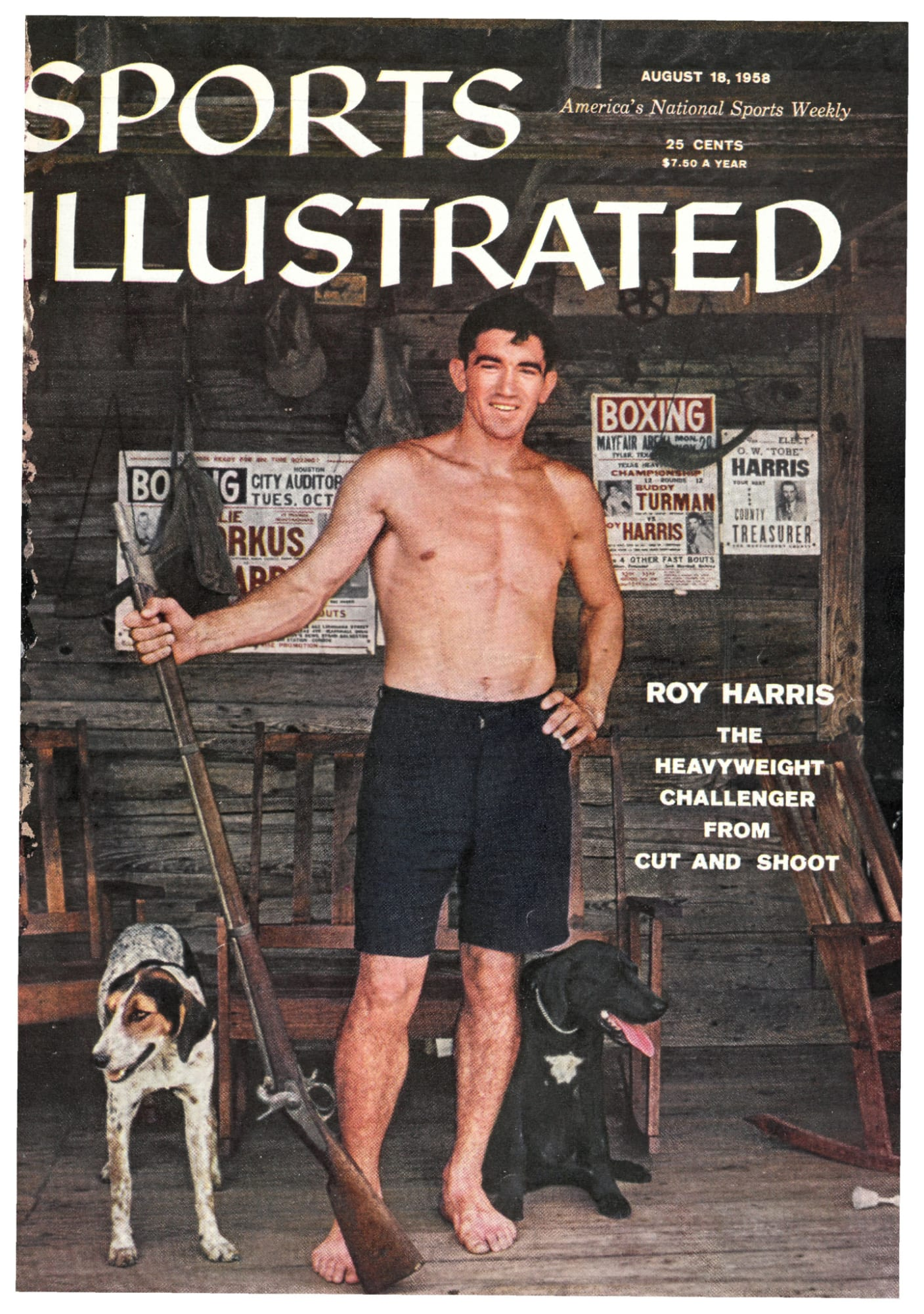
- Harris on a Sports Illustrated issue cover dated August 18, 1958

Personal information
- Nickname: Cut N' Shoot
- Nationality: American
- Born: Roy Harris; June 29, 1933 Cut and Shoot, Texas, U.S.
- Died: August 8, 2023 (aged 90) Cut and Shoot, Texas, U.S.
- Height: 6 ft 0 in (183 cm)
- Weight: Heavyweight

Boxing career
- Reach: 73 in (185 cm)
- Stance: Orthodox

Boxing record
- Total fights: 36
- Wins: 30
- Win by KO: 9
- Losses: 5
- Draws: 0
- No contests: 1

Roy Harris (June 29, 1933 – August 8, 2023) was an American lawyer and heavyweight boxer. His nickname derived from his place of birth, Cut and Shoot, Texas. Roy was a co-trainer of title contender Alfonso López III.

== Early life ==
Roy Harris was born in Cut and Shoot, Texas on June 29, 1933. His father, a lifelong hog farmer, taught him how to box and wrestle. Following his four Golden Gloves championship victories, he enrolled in Sam Houston State University, excelling as an honor student, before joining the United States Army. He rose to the rank of Captain and served in the reserves for another 12 years.

== Amateur career ==
Harris and his brother Henry took up the boxing together after receiving their first set of gloves in a trade for wild ducks. He was a four-time Texas Golden Gloves amateur champion, won his state Olympic Trials in 1952, and was the winner of the Joe Louis Sportsmanship Award at the 1954 National Golden Gloves.

== Professional career ==
Harris was a heavyweight contender during the 1950s. He won his first 23 fights, including consecutive wins against Willi Besmanoff, Bob Baker and Willie Pastrano, and was named Ring Magazine's progress of the year for 1957.

=== World Heavyweight Championship ===
Before the bout, Harris was on the cover of Sports Illustrated. In August 1958, he was given a title shot by world champion Floyd Patterson. Patterson had trouble obtaining title defenses, as boxing at the time was controlled by organisations that Patterson and his manager, Cus D'Amato, refused to cooperate with.

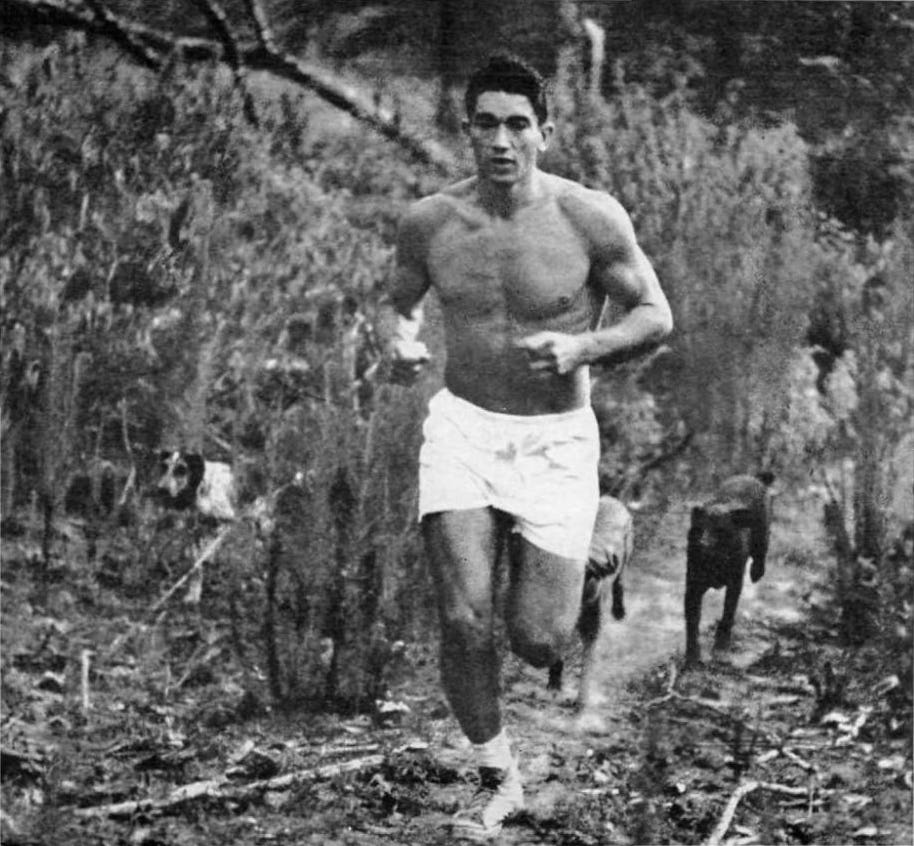
Harris training for the title fight in Cut and Shoot, TX

The promotion was colorful, due to the backstory of Harris' kinsmen, one of the celebrated East Texas clans still existing as their forebears had for generations. Much was made of the "backwoods" quality of Harris' life, and every venue was utilized in using this as ballyhoo; this extended as far as having Harris record a 45 RPM record entitled "Cut 'n Shoot (Texas, U.S.A.)" (b/w "Desert in the Sky", Decca Records 9-30717). Harris was predictably photographed in cowboy hat and boots, and in one wire photo, he holds a revolver at the ready (AP Wirephoto rw41500sh). The aforementioned Sports Illustrated cover portrayed him barechested and barefoot, standing upon a cabin porch with 19th Century rifle at rest beside him; he further sports a canine companion. To watch the fight in Texas, Harris' extended family gathered at the drive-in theater in nearby Conroe, which was equipped for the occasion with its own closed circuit movie hook-up.

The fight took place at Wrigley Field, Los Angeles, CA. Harris knocked down the champion in the second round, but was himself knocked down four times; his corner stopped the fight before the 13th round. Mushy Callahan was the referee.

When questioned, Harris - a former winner of the Joe Louis Sportsman Award - simply said: "I did my best."

Harris subsequently won six consecutive fights, before being stopped 2:35 into his bout with Sonny Liston. He then dropped a decision to Henry Cooper and was stopped twice by Bob Cleroux.

== Retirement ==
Harris retired with a final record of 30 wins and five losses. He is believed to be the only boxer to become a lawyer after fighting for the world heavyweight title. Harris was a county clerk in Montgomery County for 28 years. He began practicing law in 1972 and drew up the papers for Cut And Shoot to become incorporated. Harris' office was based in his home and he had been married 47 years and has six children.

== Death ==
Roy Harris died at his home on August 8, 2023, surrounded by his children and family. He was 90.

== Professional boxing record ==
30 Wins (9 knockouts, 20 decisions, 1 DQ), 5 Losses (4 knockouts, 1 decision), 1 No Contest
Result	Record	Opponent	Type	Round	Date	Location	Notes
Loss	25-2-1	(Canada) Bob Cleroux	TKO	4	23/05/1961	(United States) Sam Houston Coliseum, Houston, Texas	Referee stopped the bout at 3:00 of the fourth round.
Win	13-5	(United Kingdom) Dave Rent	DQ	5	28/02/1961	(United States) Houston, Texas	Rent disqualified at 2:03 of the fifth round for headbutting.
Loss	20-7-1	(United Kingdom) Henry Cooper	PTS	10	13/09/1960	(United Kingdom) Empire Pool, Wembley, London	
Loss	20-1-1	(Canada) Bob Cleroux	KO	5	27/07/1960	(Canada) Delorimier Stadium, Montreal, Quebec	Harris knocked out at 1:12 of the fifth round.
Loss	28-1	(United States) Sonny Liston	TKO	1	25/04/1960	(United States) Sam Houston Coliseum, Houston, Texas	Referee stopped the bout at 2:35 of the first round.
Win	58-25-7	(United States) Henry Hall	UD	7	21/03/1960	(United States) Dallas Memorial Auditorium, Dallas, Texas	
Win	4-0	(Argentina) Alejandro Lavorante	UD	10	24/11/1959	(United States) San Antonio Municipal Auditorium, San Antonio, Texas	99-95, 100-92, 99-90.
Win	38-14-1	(Jamaica) Joe Bygraves	UD	10	25/08/1959	(United States) Sam Houston Coliseum, Houston, Texas	
Win	20-3-2	(United States) Chuck Powell	UD	10	09/06/1959	(United States) Houston, Texas	100-90, 100-90, 100-87.
Win	26-3	(United States) Donnie Fleeman	UD	12	01/04/1959	(United States) Dallas Memorial Auditorium, Dallas, Texas	Texas Heavyweight Title. 120-108, 120-105, 119-109.
No Contest	12-5-1	(United States) John Hunt	NC	5	03/02/1959	(United States) El Paso County Coliseum, El Paso, Texas	
Win	25-2	(United States) Donnie Fleeman	UD	12	01/12/1958	(United States) Dallas Memorial Auditorium, Dallas, Texas	Texas Heavyweight Title. 119-109, 120-107, 120-107.
Loss	33-1	(United States) Floyd Patterson	RTD	12	18/08/1958	(United States) Wrigley Field, Los Angeles, California	World Heavyweight Title. 97-117, 102-116, 98-117.
Win	37-9-7	(Germany) Willi Besmanoff	UD	10	29/10/1957	(United States) Sam Houston Coliseum, Houston, Texas	97-91, 100-91, 100-91.
Win	40-4-5	(United States) Willie Pastrano	UD	10	11/06/1957	(United States) Houston, Texas	97-96, 98-95, 98-95.
Win	47-9-1	(United States) Bob "The Grinder" Baker	MD	10	30/04/1957	(United States) Sam Houston Coliseum, Houston, Texas	96-93, 97-92, 96-96.
Win	28-12-1	(United States) Joey Rowan	PTS	10	26/02/1957	(United States) Houston City Auditorium, Houston, Texas	
Win	25-4	(United States) Claude Chapman	TKO	8	29/01/1957	(United States) Houston, Texas	
Win	5-1	(United States) JD Marshall	TKO	2	19/11/1956	(United States) Tyler, Texas	
Win	26-13	(United States) Charley Norkus	UD	10	02/10/1956	(United States) Houston City Auditorium, Houston, Texas	
Win	27-4	(United States) Oscar Pharo	PTS	10	27/08/1956	(United States) Tyler, Texas	
Win	7-4	(United States) Calvin Butler	PTS	10	30/05/1956	(United States) Sam Houston Coliseum, Houston, Texas	
Win	49-13-6	(United States) "Chief" Alvin Williams	UD	10	21/05/1956	(United States) Tyler, Texas	
Win	1-5-1	(United States) Johnny Bullard	KO	4	16/04/1956	(United States) Tyler, Texas	
Win	9-3	(United States) Don Howard Tucker	KO	3	20/02/1956	(United States) Tyler, Texas	
Win	12-24-4	(United States) Ponce DeLeon Taylor	PTS	10	13/12/1955	(United States) Houston City Auditorium, Houston, Texas	
Win	11-1	(United States) Buddy Turman	SD	12	28/11/1955	(United States) Tyler, Texas	Texas Heavyweight Title.
Win	2-7-2	(United States) Fred Taylor	PTS	10	01/11/1955	(United States) Houston, Texas	
Win	2-5	(United States) Duke Smith	KO	3	01/10/1955	(United States) Tyler, Texas	
Win	0-2	(United States) LeJune Burks	KO	6	30/09/1955	(United States) Conroe, Texas	
Win	1-5	(United States) Dick Brown	TKO	3	30/08/1955	(United States) Sam Houston Coliseum, Houston, Texas	
Win	--	Chuck Connor	KO	2	28/06/1955	(United States) Sam Houston Coliseum, Houston, Texas	
Win	--	(United States) Bobby Watson	PTS	6	14/06/1955	(United States) LaGrave Field, Fort Worth, Texas	
Win	4-1	(United States) Ted Donald	PTS	8	03/06/1955	(United States) Conroe, Texas	
Win	9-16	(United States) JD Harvey	PTS	6	03/05/1955	(United States) Galveston City Auditorium, Galveston, Texas	
Win	--	(United States) Tommie Smith	TKO	3	26/04/1955	(United States) Sam Houston Coliseum, Houston, Texas	

== Bibliography ==
- Harris, Roy; Montgomery, Robin Navarro (2012). Roy Harris of Cut and Shoot: Texas Backwoods Battler. Bloomington, IN: iUniverse, Inc. ISBN 9781475960679. OCLC 819070994.
