= Buddy Turman =

American boxer

- Buddy Turman c. 1956

Personal information
- Nickname: Buddy
- Born: Reagan Garth Turman; April 12, 1933 Noonday, Texas, U.S.
- Died: April 1, 2007 (aged 73) Longview, Texas, U.S.
- Height: 6 ft 0 in (1.83 m)
- Weight: Heavyweight

Boxing career
- Reach: 72 in (183 cm)
- Stance: Orthodox

Boxing record
- Total fights: 62
- Wins: 46
- Win by KO: 32
- Losses: 15
- Draws: 1

Reagan Garth "Buddy" Turman (April 12, 1933 – April 1, 2007) was an American professional boxer who competed in the Heavyweight division.

== Boxing career ==
In his two years as an amateur in Texas, Turman accrued 20 wins and 5 losses, and one draw, he set a record for the quickest knockout in National AAU history.

Turman fought his first professional match in September 1954, against Bobby Babcock, which he won. Five months later, Turman became the first white man to legally fight an African-American in Texas thanks to the efforts of African-American I. H. "Sporty" Harvey, who had successfully challenged boxing segregation in court. Turman won the match against Harvey on February 24, 1955, and won a rematch in June 1955.

In November 1955, with 11 wins and one loss, Turman fought Roy "Cut-n-Shoot" Harris for the Texas Heavyweight Championship in Tyler, Texas. Turman lost the fight in a controversial decision, which allowed Harris to move on to fight Floyd Patterson for the World Heavyweight Title. This decision severely hampered Turman's chances of winning the World Title.

Two years later, with 25 wins and only 3 losses, Turman faced Oscar Pharo for a second time. In the third fight of his professional career, Turman had been beaten by a more experienced Pharo on points. In the rematch, Turman won on a KO within 59 seconds of the first round.

In May 1959, at Madison Square Garden, Turman defeated Bob Cleroux, who a year later would win the Canadian Heavyweight Title. The next year, Turman faced World Light-Heavyweight Champion and World Heavyweight Contender, Archie Moore, in Dallas, Texas. Moore won by decision. However, Cassius Clay, who was in attendance, afterwards expressed to Turman his dismay at the judges' decision. Moore publicly acknowledged that Turman should be considered one of the top five heavyweights in the world. Turman subsequently spent time at Moore's training camp in San Diego, where Clay was also training.

Turman began fighting abroad in 1961, in Manila, Philippines where a rematch was scheduled with Moore. However, Moore postponed the fight by three weeks after Turman had already arrived. This left Turman badly out of practice by the time of the fight, as there were no local heavyweights to spar with. Moore won by unanimous decision. Turman subsequently fought in Italy, South Africa, Germany, and England. He won his last match, which he fought against Rudolf Nehring on December 15, 1967, in Munich, Germany.

Turman fought a total of 62 professional matches and won 45 of them including 32 KOs. He had friendships with several of the best known boxers of his time, including Henry Cooper, Jack Dempsey, Joe Louis, Billy Conn, and Rocky Marciano.

== Outside the ring ==
By the late fifties, Turman enjoyed celebrity status in Texas, especially in Dallas and Tyler. However, to supplement his inadequate boxing income he had to take other jobs. After a fight in Dallas, he met Jack Ruby. They became friends and Turman began working off and on for him as a manager and bouncer at some of his Dallas night clubs. Turman was interviewed by the FBI soon after Ruby killed Lee Harvey Oswald in November 1963. Turman shared his opinions of Ruby and what he knew of Ruby's acquaintances in the Dallas Police Department.

Turman was married and had a son in Dallas in the late fifties, he began to seek work in films and television to support the family. First, he made a cameo appearance on an episode of Westinghouse Desilu Playhouse (1958) with Lucille Ball and Aldo Ray, and a few years later he appeared as a regular guest on Hollywood Squares. He was also considered for various roles that never materialized (including the lead role in a proposed biopic about his friend Jack Dempsey). Turman's marriage was brief, but he and his ex-wife remained lifelong friends. They continued to share responsibility for raising their son.

While living on the west coast, Turman befriended German boxer and wrestler Wilhelm von Homburg (who eventually had roles in several Hollywood films). Soon thereafter Turman began primarily fighting abroad. He spent much of the last two years of his career fighting on the same ticket as von Homberg throughout Germany. Von Homberg and Turman visited each other periodically and corresponded often in the following years. After von Homberg was diagnosed with cancer, he was visited by Turman for two weeks in Longview, Texas before going to Mexico where he eventually died.

After Turman's boxing years, he held various jobs including oil lease agent in East Texas and bartender and security guard at Binion's Horseshoe in Las Vegas.

He died on April 1, 2007, in Longview, Texas, of complications from Hepatitis C.

== Professional boxing record ==
45 Wins (32 knockouts, 13 decisions), 15 Losses (4 knockouts, 9 decisions, 2 DQ), 2 Draws
Result	Record	Opponent	Type	Round	Date	Location	Notes
Win	28-17-10	(Germany) Rudolf Nehring	KO	2	15/12/1967	(Germany) Circus Krone, Munich, Bavaria	
Win	4-21-2	(Germany) Manfred Ackers	TKO	4	09/12/1966	(Germany) Festhalle Frankfurt, Frankfurt, Hesse	
Win	15-15-3	(United States) David E. Bailey	TKO	9	15/04/1966	(Germany) Ernst Merck Halle, Hamburg	
Loss	10-1-1	(Italy) Dante Cane	PTS	8	10/03/1966	(Italy) Milan, Lombardy	
Win	13-7-4	(Sweden) Lars Olaf Norling	TKO	4	28/05/1965	(Germany) Deutschlandhalle, Charlottenburg, Berlin	
Loss	21-5	(United Kingdom) Jack Bodell	TKO	4	20/04/1965	(United Kingdom) Wolverhampton Civic Hall, Wolverhampton, West Midlands	
Loss	9-8-3	(Croatia) Ivan Prebeg	DQ	5	02/04/1965	(Austria) Stadthalle, Vienna	
Win	7-7-1	(Denmark) Carl Welschou	TKO	4	06/03/1965	(Germany) Neue Sporthalle, Hannover, Lower Saxony	
Win	4-9	(Luxembourg) Ray Cillien	KO	2	13/02/1965	(Germany) Ernst Merck Halle, Hamburg	
Loss	24-3-3	(Italy) Piero Tomasoni	PTS	10	05/02/1965	(Italy) Milan, Lombardy	
Win	1-8	(Germany) Manfred Ackers	TKO	4	16/01/1965	(Germany) Westfalenhallen, Dortmund, North Rhine-Westphalia	
Win	25-19-8	(Germany) Ulli Ritter	TKO	5	14/11/1964	(Germany) Westfalenhallen, Dortmund, North Rhine-Westphalia	
Loss	27-6	(South Africa) Billy Lotter	PTS	10	03/10/1964	(South Africa) Caledonian Grounds, Pretoria, Gauteng	
Win	10-15-4	(United States) Dave Furch	PTS	10	10/05/1964	(United States) Las Vegas, Nevada	
Win	4-4-1	(United States) Sam Pride	UD	10	05/02/1964	(United States) Utah State Fair, Salt Lake City, Utah	
Draw	4-7	(United States) George Johnson	PTS	10	05/11/1962	(United States) Tyler, Texas	
Loss	16-0	(Italy) Franco De Piccoli	DQ	2	19/07/1962	(Italy) Rome, Lazio	
Loss	13-6-1	(United States) Pete Rademacher	TKO	9	30/11/1961	(United States) Fair Park Coliseum, Dallas, Texas	
Loss	179-22-9	(United States) Archie Moore	UD	10	25/03/1961	(Philippines) Araneta Coliseum, Quezon City, Metro Manila	39-50, 42-50, 50-53.
Loss	178-22-9	(United States) Archie Moore	UD	10	28/11/1960	(United States) Dallas Memorial Auditorium, Dallas, Texas	94-99, 94-96, 96-100.
Loss	23-1-1	(Canada) Bob Cleroux	KO	2	26/10/1960	(Canada) Montreal Forum, Montreal, Quebec	Turman knocked out at 0:53 of the second round.
Win	12-9-2	(United States) Sonny "Policeman" Moore	MD	10	25/04/1960	(United States) Dallas Memorial Auditorium, Dallas, Texas	Archie Moore refereed the bout. 98-94, 98-95, 97-97.
Win	12-8-2	(United States) Sonny "Policeman" Moore	MD	10	21/03/1960	(United States) Dallas Memorial Auditorium, Dallas, Texas	
Win	26-15-3	(United States) Tommy "Hurricane" Sims	KO	3	01/03/1960	(United States) Amarillo, Texas	Sims knocked out at 2:06 of the third round.
Draw	30-6	(United States) Donnie Fleeman	PTS	10	02/11/1959	(United States) Dallas, Texas	
Win	25-9-3	(United States) Tommy "Hurricane" Sims	PTS	10	29/09/1959	(United States) Tyler, Texas	
Win	12-0-1	(Canada) Bob Cleroux	PTS	8	29/05/1959	(United States) Madison Square Garden, New York City	
Win	22-9-4	(United States) Bob Albright	KO	10	05/05/1959	(United States) Mike Carter Field, Tyler, Texas	Albright knocked out at 2:40 of the tenth round.
Loss	21-9-4	(United States) Bob Albright	KO	2	21/03/1959	(United States) Hollywood Legion Stadium, Hollywood, California	Turman knocked out at 2:59 of the second round.
Win	4-2	(United States) Billy Walters	KO	2	27/01/1959	(United States) Tyler, Texas	
Loss	22-1	(United States) Donnie Fleeman	UD	10	30/06/1958	(United States) Dallas Memorial Auditorium, Dallas, Texas	95-98, 97-98, 95-98.
Win	11-10-3	(United States) Jackie Jacobs	KO	1	07/04/1958	(United States) Dallas Sportatorium, Dallas, Texas	Jacobs knocked out at 2:30 of the first round.
Win	4-2	(United States) Dean Bogany	KO	3	11/03/1958	(United States) Tyler, Texas	
Win	51-20-6	(United States) "Chief" Alvin Williams	PTS	10	28/01/1958	(United States) Tyler, Texas	
Win	27-5	(United States) Oscar Pharo	KO	1	17/12/1957	(United States) Tyler, Texas	
Win	2-2	(United States) "Big" Ben Marshall	KO	2	30/09/1957	(United States) Tyler, Texas	
Win	6-4-2	(United States) Tommy Fields	TKO	8	27/06/1957	(United States) Dallas, Texas	
Loss	24-11-1	(United States) Art Swiden	PTS	10	18/04/1957	(United States) Dallas Sportatorium, Dallas, Texas	
Win	10-8-1	(United States) Jesse "Cannonball" Brown	KO	3	04/03/1957	(United States) Tyler, Texas	
Win	--	Otis Carr	KO	1	31/01/1957	(United States) Dallas, Texas	
Win	1-1	Haywood Crosser	KO	2	21/01/1957	(United States) Tyler, Texas	
Win	12-26-4	(United States) Ponce DeLeon Taylor	KO	4	10/12/1956	(United States) Ector County Coliseum, Odessa, Texas	
Win	18-4	(United States) Emil Brtko	TKO	3	01/11/1956	(United States) Dallas Sportatorium, Dallas, Texas	
Win	5-5-1	(United States) Felix Antonio	KO	4	18/09/1956	(United States) Lubbock, Texas	
Win	5-4-1	(United States) Felix Antonio	KO	5	16/08/1956	(United States) Dallas Sportatorium, Dallas, Texas	Antonio knocked out at 2:25 of the fifth round.
Win	--	(United States) Soldier Paul Daniel	KO	2	23/07/1956	(United States) Tyler, Texas	
Win	4-2	(United States) Freddie Thompson	KO	2	21/06/1956	(United States) Dallas Sportatorium, Dallas, Texas	
Win	1-1	(United States) Dick Mays	KO	2	03/05/1956	(United States) Dallas Sportatorium, Dallas, Texas	
Win	13-18-2	(United States) Ranchero Alonzo	TKO	5	29/03/1956	(United States) Heart O' Texas Coliseum, Waco, Texas	38-37, 39-36, 39-36.
Loss	9-0	(United States) Roy Harris	SD	12	28/11/1955	(United States) Tyler, Texas	Texas Heavyweight Title.
Win	5-2-1	(United States) Alvin Green	KO	10	07/11/1955	(United States) Tyler, Texas	
Win	5-1-1	(United States) Alvin Green	PTS	10	17/10/1955	(United States) Tyler, Texas	
Win	10-6-3	(United States) Red Worley	UD	10	18/08/1955	(United States) Dallas Sportatorium, Dallas, Texas	Jack Dempsey refereed the bout.
Win	12-22-4	(United States) Ponce DeLeon Taylor	PTS	10	20/06/1955	(United States) Tyler, Texas	
Win	10-18	(United States) JD Harvey	PTS	10	03/06/1955	(United States) Tyler, Texas	
Win	--	(United States) Leroy Failes	KO	4	05/05/1955	(United States) Beaumont, Texas	
Win	1-5	(United States) Jim Saddler	KO	2	18/03/1955	(United States) Tyler, Texas	
Win	8-15	(United States) JD Harvey	UD	10	24/02/1955	(United States) Dallas Sportatorium, Dallas, Texas	
Win	1-2	(United States) Buddy Babcock	KO	2	10/02/1955	(United States) Dallas Sportatorium, Dallas, Texas	
Loss	20-3	(United States) Oscar Pharo	UD	10	13/01/1955	(United States) Birmingham, Alabama	Jack Dempsey refereed the bout.
Win	1-1	(United States) Max Baird	KO	2	17/12/1954	(United States) Birmingham, Alabama	
Win	1-1	(United States) Buddy Babcock	UD	4	28/09/1954	(United States) City Auditorium, Galveston, Texas	
