= Cut and Shoot, Texas =

- City
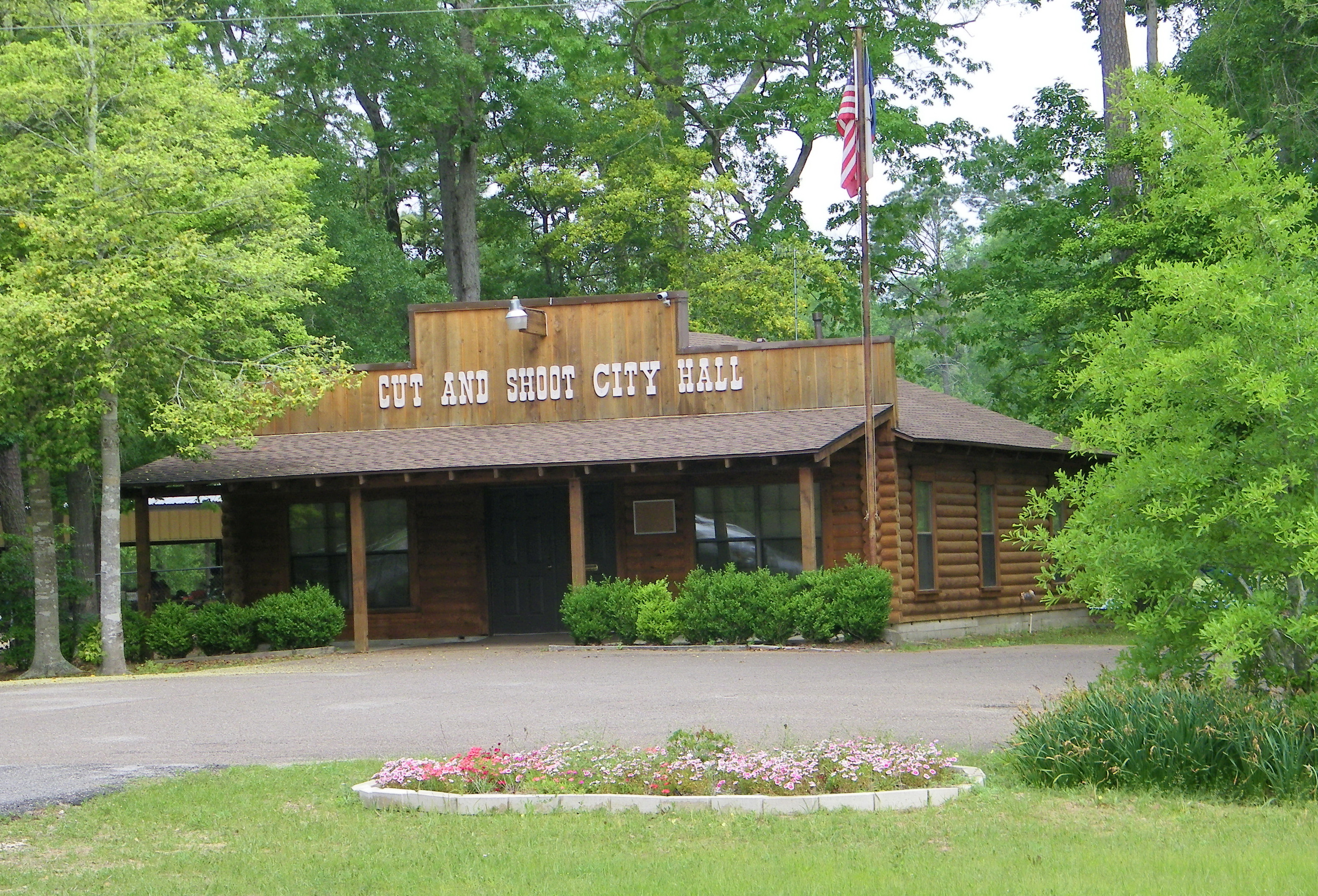
- The City Hall of Cut and Shoot, Texas

- Location of Cut and Shoot, Texas
- Coordinates: 30°19′59″N 95°21′33″W
- Country: United States
- State: Texas
- County: Montgomery

Government
  - Mayor: Nyla Akin Dalhaus
  - Aldermen: Bill Green; Jason Wieghat; Thomas Robinson; Charlie Musgrove; Ryan Wallace

Area
  - Total: 2.71 sq mi (7.02 km^{2})
  - Land: 2.71 sq mi (7.02 km^{2})
  - Water: 0 sq mi (0.00 km^{2})
- Elevation: 190 ft (58 m)

Population (2020)
  - Total: 1,087
  - Density: 530.5/sq mi (204.84/km^{2})
- Time zone: UTC-6 (Central (CST))
  - Summer (DST): UTC-5 (CDT)
- ZIP codes: 77303, 77306
- Area code: 936
- FIPS code: 48-18260
- GNIS feature ID: 1381207
- Website: https://cutandshoot.org/

Cut and Shoot is a city in eastern Montgomery County, Texas, United States, about 6 mi (9.7 km) east of Conroe and 40 mi (64 km) north of Houston. Until 2006, Cut and Shoot was considered and called a town. Then, the town council elected for it to be considered and referred to as a city. The population was 1,087 at the 2020 census.

== Name ==
According to one local legend, Cut and Shoot was named after a 1912 community confrontation that almost led to violence. According to differing versions of the story, the dispute was over:

- The design of a new steeple for the town's only church,
- The issue of who should be allowed to preach there, or
- The conflicting land claims among church members.

Whatever the circumstances were, a small boy at the scene reportedly said he was scared and declared, "I'm going to cut around the corner and shoot through the bushes in a minute!" This statement apparently stayed in the residents' minds and was eventually adopted as the town's name. "Cut and Shoot" has frequently been noted on lists of unusual place names.

== History ==
The town of Cut and Shoot gained fame when local boxer Roy Harris, a heavyweight contender, fought Floyd Patterson for the heavyweight title in 1958. Harris appeared on the cover of Sports Illustrated and was featured in LIFE. So much mail was addressed to "Roy Harris, Cut and Shoot, Texas" that the U. S. Postal Service granted a franchise post office to the town.

Population statistics were not reported for the community until the mid-1970s, when the number of residents was 50. By 1980, the incorporated community reported a population of 809, had a new town hall, and supported a school and several businesses.

== Geography ==
According to the United States Census Bureau, the town had a total area of 2.7 sq mi (7.0 km^{2}), all land.

== Demographics ==
Historical population
Census	Pop.	Note	%±
1970	451		—
1980	568		25.9%
1990	903		59.0%
2000	1,158		28.2%
2010	1,070		−7.6%
2020	1,087		1.6%
U.S. Decennial Census

=== 2020 census ===
As of the 2020 census, Cut and Shoot had a population of 1,087. The median age was 41.0 years. 22.7% of residents were under the age of 18 and 18.0% of residents were 65 years of age or older. For every 100 females there were 101.3 males, and for every 100 females age 18 and over there were 101.9 males age 18 and over.

7.5% of residents lived in urban areas, while 92.5% lived in rural areas.

There were 389 households in Cut and Shoot, of which 34.4% had children under the age of 18 living in them. Of all households, 55.5% were married-couple households, 16.7% were households with a male householder and no spouse or partner present, and 18.5% were households with a female householder and no spouse or partner present. About 18.0% of all households were made up of individuals and 7.4% had someone living alone who was 65 years of age or older.

There were 434 housing units, of which 10.4% were vacant. The homeowner vacancy rate was 0.6% and the rental vacancy rate was 10.5%.

Racial composition as of the 2020 census
Race	Number	Percent
White	813	74.8%
Black or African American	9	0.8%
American Indian and Alaska Native	21	1.9%
Asian	1	0.1%
Native Hawaiian and Other Pacific Islander	1	0.1%
Some other race	91	8.4%
Two or more races	151	13.9%
Hispanic or Latino (of any race)	258	23.7%

=== 2010 census ===
As of the 2010 United States census, there were 1,070 people, 371 households, and 289 families residing in the town. The population density was 396.3 inhabitants per square mile (153.0/km^{2}). The racial makeup of the town was 87.2% White, 1.0% African American, 0.8% Native American, 0.2% Asian, 0.1% Native Hawaiian 8.2% from other races, and 2.4% from two or more races. Hispanic or Latino of any race were 15.0% of the population.

Out of 371 households, 77.9% are family households, 34.5% with children under 18 years. 63.6% were husband-wife families. Out of 371 households, 22.1% were non-family households, with 18.1% of householders living alone. The average household size was 2.88; the average family size was 3.23.

27.9% of the population is under the age of 18. 11.9% are over the age of 65. The median age is 37.1. 50.6% of the population is female.

=== 2000 census ===
As of the 2000 census, the median income for a household in the town was $40,455, and the median income for a family was $47,404. Males had a median income of $36,719 versus $20,833 for females. The per capita income for the town was $15,482. About 5.7% of families and 8.9% of the population were below the poverty line, including 7.5% of those under age 18 and 15.5% of those age 65 or over.

== Government and infrastructure ==
Cut and Shoot is governed locally by an elected mayor and five at-large city council positions. As of June 2022, the mayor is Nyla Akin Dalhaus. City council members, also known as Aldermen, are Bill Green, Jason Wieghat, Thomas Robinson, Charlie Musgrove, and Ryan Wallace.

Cut and Shoot is in Texas Senate District 4, represented by Republican Brandon Creighton. Cut and Shoot is in District 16 of the Texas House of Representatives, represented by Republican Will Metcalf.

In Congress, Cut and Shoot is represented in the Senate by Republicans John Cornyn and Ted Cruz, and in the House of Representatives, Cut and Shoot is in District 8, represented by Morgan Luttrell.

The City of Cut and Shoot is one of the very few statewide municipalities that has no ad valorem property tax within its city limits. The only tax based city income is from a 1% sales tax on taxable goods and services within the city limits.

The United States Postal Service Cut and Shoot Post Office is located at 13985 Texas State Highway 105 East.

Cut and Shoot includes Groceville, an unincorporated populated place.

The previously abandoned Cut and Shoot Airfield owned by the Schank family was redeveloped into Chennault Airfield - 25TX, a privately owned flight training airstrip operated by General Chennault Flying Tiger Academy and opened in November 2023.

== Education ==
Cut and Shoot is within the Conroe Independent School District and the Lone Star College System (formerly North Harris Montgomery Community College District).

Schools serving Cut and Shoot include Austin Elementary School, Veterans Memorial Intermediate School, Moorhead Junior High School, and Caney Creek High School. Previously the intermediate school zoned was Grangerland Intermediate School.

Residents of Conroe ISD (and therefore Cut and Shoot) are served by the Lone Star College System (formerly North Harris Montgomery Community College).

== Notable people ==
- Roy Harris, a heavyweight boxer
- Debra Maffett, named Miss America 1983, hailed from Cut and Shoot
- Michael Mayes, opera performer
