= Muhammad Ali vs. George Chuvalo =

Boxing competition

- Date: March 29, 1966
- Venue: Maple Leaf Gardens, Toronto, Ontario, Canada
- Title(s) on the line: WBC, NYSAC, and The Ring heavyweight titles

Tale of the tape
| Boxer | (United States) Muhammad Ali | (Canada) George Chuvalo |
| Nickname | "The Greatest" | |
| Hometown | Louisville, Kentucky, U.S. | Toronto, Ontario, Canada |
| Purse | $90,000 | $35,000 to $40,000 |
| Pre-fight record | 22–0 (18 KO) | 34–11–2 (27 KO) |
| Age | 24 years, 2 months | 28 years, 6 months |
| Height | 6 ft 3 in (191 cm) | 6 ft 0 in (183 cm) |
| Weight | 215 lb (98 kg) | 216 lb (98 kg) |
| Style | Orthodox | Orthodox |
| Recognition | WBC, NYSAC, and The Ring heavyweight champion | WBA; No. 10 Ranked Heavyweight; Canadian heavyweight champion |

Result
- Ali won via UD

Muhammad Ali vs. George Chuvalo was a professional boxing match contested on March 29, 1966, for the WBC, NYSAC, and The Ring heavyweight championship.

== Background ==
Ali was scheduled to fight WBA champion Ernie Terrell in Chicago, Illinois, on March 29, 1966, however Ali, facing the possibility of being drafted into the United States Army created a huge uproar by saying, "I ain't got no quarrel with them Viet Cong. No Viet Cong ever called me n*****." He was called before the Illinois State Athletic Commission to apologize for his "unpatriotic remarks." Ali would refuse to apologize, which prompted Illinois Attorney General William G. Clark to declare the bout "illegal" forcing Bob Arum to search for an alternative location. Ultimately a deal for Ali to fight in Toronto, Canada was agreed, with Canadian heavyweight champion George Chuvalo agreeing to face Ali on 17 day notice.

== The fight ==
Ali won the fight on points, by unanimous decision. The Associated Press scored the fight 13–2 to Ali.

== Aftermath ==
The fight was the subject of Joseph Blasioli's 2003 documentary film The Last Round: Chuvalo vs. Ali.

== Undercard ==
Confirmed bouts:

== Broadcasting ==
| Country | Broadcaster |
|---|---|
| Philippines | CBN 9 |
| United States | ABC |

| Preceded by vs. Floyd Patterson | Muhammad Ali's bouts 29 March 1966 | Succeeded by vs. Henry Cooper II |
| Preceded by vs. Jim Christopher | George Chuvalo's bouts 29 March 1966 | Succeeded by vs. Tommy Burns |
