= Bob Cleroux =

Canadian boxer (1938–2025)

Personal information
- Nationality: (Canada) Canadian
- Born: Robert Cléroux; 1938 Montreal, Quebec, Canada
- Died: April 25, 2025 (aged 86–87) Canada
- Occupation: Boxer
- Height: 6 ft 1 in (185cm)
- Weight: Heavyweight

Boxing career
- Stance: Orthodox

Boxing record
- Total fights: 54
- Wins: 47
- Win by KO: 37
- Losses: 6
- Draws: 1

Bob Cleroux (born Robert Cléroux; 1938 – April 25, 2025) was a Canadian professional heavyweight boxer. He was a two-time Canadian heavyweight champion.

== Early life ==
Robert Cléroux was born in Quebec, Canada, in 1938.

== Amateur boxing career ==
Bob Cleroux competed at the national championships as an amateur, winning the 1956 Canadian amateur boxing title. Coached by Jacques Chevrier and Ned Lafontaine at the Immaculate Conception Centre, he claimed victory in the open class heavyweight division at the 1957 Quebec Golden Gloves Championships, followed by the heavyweight title at the 1957 Canadian Amateur Boxing Championships.

== Professional career ==
Cleroux turned professional in the summer of 1957 and made his pro debut at the Montreal Forum. He was under contract at the time with Raymond Lagacé, the then-mayor of L'Abord-à-Plouffe. By the end of 1958, he had posted 8 wins, 0 losses, and 1 draw in fights held in Canada. From 1958 on, his father and Al Bachman of New York co-managed Cleroux's career.

His debut at New York's famed Madison Square Garden came against Buddy Turman on May 29, 1959. The contest resulted in the first loss of Cleroux's professional boxing career after he lost on points. He returned to the Garden in February 1960 to defeat Willi Besmanoff by unanimous decision.

Al Bachman brought veteran American trainer Whitey Bimstein into Cleroux's camp during the summer of 1960. In July 1960, he climbed into the tenth spot in the National Boxing Association ratings with a fifth-round knockout over Roy Harris. Cleroux recorded his 18th knockout across 22 professional bouts.

=== Taking the Canadian heavyweight championship, August 1960 ===
Cleroux, who held a record of 22-1-1, faced Toronto's George Chuvalo for the Canadian heavyweight championship at Delorimier Stadium on August 17, 1960. He claimed the title with a split-decision verdict, ending Chuvalo's two-year reign. Two of the three judges scored it for world-rated challenger Cleroux. The bout drew an estimated 14,000 fight fans and was officiated by former world heavyweight champion Jersey Joe Walcott.

==== Notable bouts during heavyweight title reign ====
He then stopped Richie Norden by TKO and defeated Buddy Turman with a second-round knockout in their rematch on October 26, 1960, in Montreal.

Cleroux was arranged to face Chuvalo in a rematch for the Canadian heavyweight championship. He lost the heavyweight title to Chuvalo on November 23, 1960, with former world heavyweight champion Jack Sharkey serving as referee. With 9,732 people in attendance, the gate receipts reached $52,738.

The Ring magazine rated Cleroux as the world's seventh-best heavyweight for 1960 in its February 1961 issue.

=== Reclaiming the Canadian heavyweight championship, August 1961 ===
In August 1961, one year after his title loss, he won the Canadian heavyweight championship from George Chuvalo for the second time. The fight was the third time the pair contested the Canadian title, generating a gate of $198,000.

The National Boxing Association placed him sixth among world heavyweights by October 1961. The heavyweight champion lined up a non-title ten-round match with Archie Moore for December 5, 1961, while disregarding his rematch clause with Chuvalo. The bout was cancelled by Eddie Quinn due to poor ticket sales.

Cleroux successfully defended his Canadian heavyweight title with a knockout win over Cecil Gray in January 1962.

In San Francisco on April 18, 1962, he lost by decision to the fifth-ranked heavyweight Zora Folley. He was ranked seventh in the 1962 annual ratings of The Ring magazine's February 1963 issue.

After the Folley fight, he stepped away from boxing and spent a few years employed at a brewery. When a staff cutback cost Cleroux his brewery job, he began a comeback campaign. He returned from a five-year retirement in July 1968. His October 1968 win against Jean-Claude Roy propelled him to top title contender status in the rankings released by the Canadian Professional Boxing Federation.

He defeated Cleveland Williams in November 1968 at the Montreal Forum. More than 11,000 fans turned out for the fight, and all three officials ruled unanimously in Cleroux's favor.

After an 8-fight win streak, his last professional bout came in July 1969, where he lost a split decision against Billy Joiner at Paul Sauvé Arena. Attendance for the fight was just shy of 5,000. His defeat knocked him out of the World Boxing Association's top ten where he had been ranked ninth, costing him a title opportunity against Jimmy Ellis for the WBA heavyweight belt.

From 1957 to 1969, the Montreal heavyweight took part in 54 bouts, finishing with a career record of 47 victories, 6 defeats, 1 draw, and 37 knockouts.

== Professional boxing record ==
54 fights	47 wins	6 losses
By knockout	37	0
By decision	10	6
Draws	1	

== Death ==
Robert Cléroux died on April 25, 2025, in Montreal, Quebec, Canada, at 87.

Achievements
Preceded by George Chuvalo	Canadian Heavyweight Champion; August 17, 1960 – November 23, 1960	Succeeded by George Chuvalo
Preceded by George Chuvalo	Canadian Heavyweight Champion; August 8, 1961 – 1963	Succeeded by George Chuvalo
