= George "Rock-a-Bye" Ross =

Canadian boxer (1922–1997)

George Ross
Personal information
- Nickname: "Rock-a-Bye"
- Nationality: (Canada) Canadian
- Born: George Ross; March 23, 1922 Marble Mountain, Nova Scotia, Canada
- Died: April 17, 1997 (aged 75) Canada
- Weight: Middleweight

Boxing career

Boxing record
- Total fights: 50
- Wins: 43
- Win by KO: 13
- Losses: 6
- Draws: 1

George "Rock-a-Bye" Ross (23 March 1922 – 17 April 1997) was a Canadian former professional middleweight boxer who won the Canadian middleweight title in 1948.

== Early life ==
George Ross was born 23 March 1922 in Marble Mountain, Inverness County, Nova Scotia, Canada.

His family moved to West Bay, Inverness County, Nova Scotia when he was five years old.

== Amateur boxing career ==
In Sydney, Nova Scotia, Ross took up boxing at the Merchant Seamans Club in 1942. His breakthrough came in the 1945 Cape Breton Golden Gloves tournament when he captured the welterweight title.

== Professional career ==
George Ross entered the professional ranks in 1946 and wasted no time establishing himself, racking up nine wins in that year alone. The Nova Scotia boxer ventured to the United States for a series of fights during the first four months of 1948, boxing in Hartford, Connecticut, and Providence, Rhode Island.

=== Taking the Canadian middleweight championship, May 1948 ===
In Glace Bay on May 1, 1948, he earned a decision victory over Canadian middleweight champion Len Wadsworth in their scheduled 12-round match. However, the Canadian Boxing Federation refused to award Ross the title, determining the bout didn't count because the Cape Breton Association wasn't a C.B.F. affiliate. Months after being denied the title, he beat Wadsworth to become Canadian middleweight champion in August 1948, winning the belt in Halifax, Nova Scotia.

With no Canadian opponents available, Ross's manager, Gus MacLellan, organized an English campaign to keep his fighter sharp and expand his experience. The Cape Breton farm boy crossed the Atlantic to England on a three-month tour to test himself against British competition. In October 1949, Ross faced Albert Finch at Earls Court Arena in London for his first fight on British soil, losing a ten-round decision. The defeat was Ross's first in 36 professional fights. Ross met British middleweight champion Dick Turpin in the ring in Birmingham, England, in November 1949. A severe cut to his left eye prevented him from finishing the scheduled 10-round fight. The loss dashed Ross's hopes of challenging Dave Sands for the Empire middleweight title.

Ross first hung up his gloves in July 1950, announcing his retirement. He invested in a combination canteen and dance hall near his home on West Bay Road.

=== Important win over Canadian light heavyweight champion Eddie Zastre, October 1952 ===
In his comeback, he fought the Canadian light heavyweight champion Eddie Zastre to a decision, which put him in line for a fight with top middleweight contender Yvon Durelle.

=== Attempt at the vacant Canadian middleweight championship, May 1953 ===
Ross faced Yvon Durelle after the CBF stripped Roy Wouters for failing to defend his title in the stipulated time. In a bid for the vacant Canadian middleweight championship in May 1953, he lost when the referee stopped the bout in the 12th round. He quit in the ring in 1953 after being stopped by Durelle in the title fight.

== Life after boxing ==
While working, he fell from a 45-foot power pole near Glace Bay and broke his back in October 1953.

He went on to work as a logger, stevedore, and miner in New Zealand and in a steel plant in Australia. In 1957, he fought twice in Australia, which proved to be his last two professional fights. He returned to Canada in 1958.

At age 37, Ross was denied a comeback fight by the Cape Breton Boxing Commission in 1959 due to his long layoff, back injury, and extended absence from the ring.

== Professional boxing record ==
50 fights	43 wins	6 losses
By knockout	13	3
By decision	30	3
Draws	1	

== Death ==
George Ross died on April 17, 1997, at 75.

== Legacy ==
The nickname "Rockabye" was given to him in recognition of his impressive knock-out record.

He was inducted into the Nova Scotia Sport Hall of Fame in 1983.
