= Karl Ameisbichler =

Austrian boxer

Personal information
- Nationality: Austrian
- Born: 25 March 1927 Klagenfurt, Austria

Sport
- Sport: Boxing

Karl Ameisbichler (born 25 March 1927, date of death unknown) was an Austrian boxer. He competed in the men's heavyweight event at the 1948 Summer Olympics.
