= Joe Erskine =

Joe Erskine may refer to:

- Joe Erskine (Welsh boxer) (1934–1990), former British and British Empire heavyweight boxing champion
- Joe Erskine (American boxer) (1930–2009), former welterweight boxer and long-distance runner
