= Montagu Hospital =

- Doncaster and Bassetlaw Teaching Hospitals NHS Foundation Trust
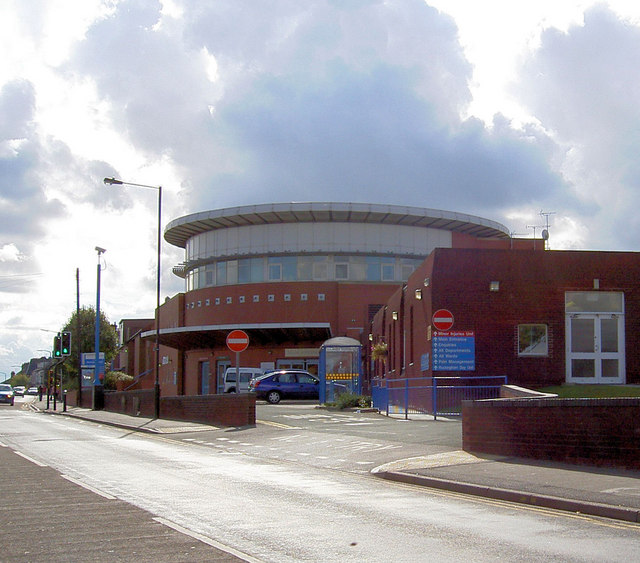
- Montagu Hospital

- Shown in South Yorkshire

Geography
- Location: Mexborough, South Yorkshire, England
- Coordinates: 53.500°N 1.285°W

Organisation
- Care system: NHS
- Type: District general

Services
- Emergency department: No

History
- Founded: 1905

Links
- Website: www.dbth.nhs.uk/contact-ward-department/montagu-hospital/
- Lists: Hospitals in England

Montagu Hospital is in Mexborough, a district of Doncaster, in South Yorkshire, England. It is managed by the Doncaster and Bassetlaw Teaching Hospitals NHS Foundation Trust, which also includes Bassetlaw District General Hospital and the Doncaster Royal Infirmary.

== History ==
The hospital has its origins in a small cottage hospital which opened at Bank Street in Mexborough in 1890. After local officials decided to build a new hospital, it moved to a new site, leased from Andrew Montagu, in 1905. Local people paid a halfpenny a week to finance the venture which initially only had 14 beds. The size of the hospital grew steadily although between 1919 and 1939, the number of hospital beds increased from 48 to 120. It joined the National Health Service in 1948.

== Services ==
The hospital has a Rehabilitation Centre, believed to be the first of its kind in the UK, which was opened in October 2013, as well as a Minor Injuries Unit staffed by emergency nurse practitioners. The £3.8m Fred & Ann Green Rehabilitation Centre has 18 single bed rooms specially designed to help people who are recovering from conditions that require intensive therapeutic, medical and nursing care. There is a rehabilitation programme seven days a week.

== See also ==
- List of hospitals in England
