= Rotherham Doncaster and South Humber NHS Foundation Trust =

Healthcare trust in England

The Rotherham Doncaster and South Humber NHS Foundation Trust, is a NHS Foundation Trust and Mental Healthcare Trust serving over 850,000 inhabitants of Doncaster, Rotherham and parts of South Humber. Its headquarters are situated at St Catherine's Hospital in Doncaster. It provides mental healthcare as well as contracted work for primary care trusts in South Yorkshire such as training and IT.

== History ==
The Trust was established as Doncaster Healthcare NHS Trust on 1 November 1991, and renamed the Doncaster and South Humber Healthcare NHS Trust on 1 October 1999 following the dissolution of Scunthorpe Community Health Care NHS Trust and merger of its services into the Trust. In April 2002 the Trust took on responsibility for the delivery of mental health services in Rotherham after Rotherham Priority Health Services NHS Trust was dissolved. The Trust underwent restructuring in June 2005 following the transfer of adult and older people's mental health services in North and North East Lincolnshire to primary care trust guardianship. It was authorised as a Foundation Trust on 1 August 2007, changing its name to Rotherham Doncaster and South Humber NHS Foundation Trust.

RDaSH's main base is St Catherine's Hospital; it also manages Tickhill Road Hospital and used to run now the defunct Loversall Hospital. It also operates at Doncaster Royal Infirmary, Rotherham General Hospital and Doncaster Gate Hospital. The Trust's annual budget is £83 million and it employs around 2590 members of staff.

Kathryn Singh, formerly Portfolio Director for the NHS Trust Development Authority, was appointed Chief Executive in February 2015.

The trust established a new centre, Carnson House, on Moorgate Road, Rotherham which also houses the Lifeline project where the two organisations will work together to expand and strengthen recovery options available.

== Performance ==
After an inspection by the Care Quality Commission in October 2016 its assessment was upgraded from "requires improvement" to "good".

== See also ==
- List of NHS trusts
