= Frank Moody =

Wales boxer

Personal information
- Nickname: The Pontypridd Puncher
- Nationality: Welsh
- Born: 27 August 1900 Taibach, Wales
- Died: 29 July 1963 (aged 62)
- Height: 5 ft 10 in (1.78 m)
- Weight: Middleweight

Boxing career

Boxing record
- Total fights: 203
- Wins: 127
- Win by KO: 63
- Losses: 54
- Draws: 15
- No contests: 7

Frank Moody (27 August 1900 – 29 July 1963) was a Welsh boxer who fought between 1914 and 1936. He is most notable for winning the British and Empire middleweight boxing championship in 1927 and 1928 and the light-heavyweight title from 1927 to 1929.

== Boxing career ==
=== Early career ===
Moody was born in Pontypridd and came from a large family, and was one of seven brothers to fight in the boxing ring. Moody began working down a coal mine at the age of eleven. By the time he was thirteen, he had begun boxing, with his first recorded fight, against "Kid Evans", taking place in Tonypandy at the age of fourteen. His early fights as a youth were mainly held in South Wales, with a few ventures to Plymouth and Liverpool. Some of his early notable bouts included a win over Australian Jack Mignot at Covent Garden and a points loss to Freddie Jacks at Blackheath. Moody gained the nickname "The Pontypridd Puncher" and was notable for his powerful right hand delivery.

By 1919, Moody was fighting on a regular basis, sometimes twice a week. His biggest match to date came on 13 January 1920, when he faced Ted "Kid" Lewis at the Free Trade Hall in Manchester. Although scheduled for twenty rounds, Moody was out-classed by his opponent, losing to Lewis by a first round knock-out. His following boxing career was solid if unspectacular, fighting little known opponents, with some success, around Britain.

=== Fights in the United States ===
Moody's fortunes changed when in October 1923 he travelled to the United States to fight a series of bouts, beginning in Massachusetts. He won three arranged bouts in New Bedford, and then beat Jackie Clark in Fall River on 30 November.

It was like fighting a dozen men, or an octopus with gloves on. Midway through the first round Greb butted me under the chin and as my head went back he gave me the lace of his left glove. He finished the stroke by jabbing his thumb into my right eye. The pain was deadly.

— Moody describing his 1924 encounter with Harry Greb

On 10 December 1923, Moody fought and beat Young Fisher at Madison Square Garden in New York. This was followed by a points defeat to Lou Bogash in Boston, in February 1924. After a handful of fights in the US, Moody faced Bogash again, this time winning by technical knock-out, and in the fight was reported to be the first person to floor Bogash in a contest. After his victory over Bogash, Moody won two more contests in Massachusetts, over experienced American boxers, George Robinson and Jock Malone. In contrast, his subsequent four fights saw his worst run whilst in America, though facing formidable opposition. Just three days after his victory over Malone, Moody travelled to Waterbury, Connecticut, to fight world middleweight champion Harry Greb. Greb stayed out of the reach of Moody's powerful right, and floored the Welshman in the fourth round with a powerful body shot; and after that Moody had little fight left, being knocked out for the count after a barrage of blows in the sixth. This was followed by defeats in rematches to Bogash and Malone, before facing future light heavyweight champion of the world, Jack Delaney. Delaney won the fight in the fifth on a technical knock-out.

After the Delaney contest, Moody took an uncharacteristic two-month break, before returning to fight Pat McCarthy, who had himself just fought Delaney. Moody won the fight with a first round knock-out, but then lost his next fight to New York's Jeff Smith. After a handful of fights in Massachusetts and Pennsylvania, Moody was given a shot at Kid Norfolk in a match staged at the Yankee Stadium, New York. Moody proved a strong opponent, stopping Norfolk in the fourth round, though Norfolk was at the end of his career, and this would be his penultimate fight. Moody fought another nineteen matches in the United States, including contests against Tiger Flowers, Maxie Rosenbloom and Dave Shade; and on 16 August 1926 he beat Del Fontaine, future Canadian middleweight champion, which was Moody's only fight in Canada.

=== British return ===
In December 1926, Moody was back in Britain and in his first few weeks back in Wales, he was boxing in Cardiff, beating Joe Bloomfield in the fourth round. Just two months later Moody was carded to fight Roland Todd at the Royal Albert Hall for the vacant British and Empire middleweight titles. Moody lifted the middleweight belt by beating Todd in a points decision.

On 11 April 1927, Moody fought Gipsy Daniels for the Welsh Light Heavyweight title, but lost on points in a 20-round fight. After a victory over Jack Stanley, he then travelled to Italy for his first fight on mainland Europe, losing to Michele Bonaglia, who would later become the Italian champion. Following the Bonglia defeat, Moody won five straight contests on British soil, before facing Ted Moore for the British Light Heavyweight title, which had been vacated by fellow Welshman, Gipsy Daniels. The fight went the full 20 rounds, with Moody winning on points.

Moody was now fighting with less frequency, and on 6 August 1928 he travelled to Glasgow to face Tommy Milligan for the British middleweight title, which Moody had vacated earlier. Milligan was knocked out in the first round, but Moody would lose his newly recaptured title just three weeks later when he was defeated by Alexander Ireland. That was Moody's final fight of 1928, and in 1929 he fought just four times, which included a win over Italy's Leone Jacovacci, a loss to the great Len Harvey and then losing his British Light Heavyweight title to Harry Crossley.

1930 began well for Moody, when he lifted the Welsh Light Heavyweight title by beating Gipsy Daniels in their third encounter. He then earned a respectable draw against German Ernst Pistulla in a contest in Hamburg. After a win over Theo Sass, he then fought a single match in 1931, before apparently retiring.

=== Boxing return ===
In 1935 Moody returned to boxing, winning two fights in Wales. These victories led to a contest with South African heavyweight Ben Foord, which saw Moody beaten in the eighth round in front of his home crowd of Pontypridd. Moody's next two bouts were against one of the greatest Welsh boxers of all time, Tommy Farr. The first encounter was for the Welsh light heavyweight title, and ended in a draw after 15 rounds. The second match with Farr in December 1935 ended in Moody's defeat in the fourth round. Moody ended his boxing career in 1936, losing by technical knockout to Frank Hough.

== Notable bouts ==
Result	Opponent	Type	Rd., Time	Date	Location	Notes
Loss	(Wales) Tommy Farr	KO	4 (12)	1935-12-21	(Wales) Greyfriars Hall, Cardiff	
Draw	(Wales) Tommy Farr	PTS	15	1935-08-14	(Wales) White City, Cardiff	
Win	(Wales) Gipsy Daniels	PTS	15	1930-08-04	(Wales) White City, Cardiff	
Loss	(United Kingdom) Len Harvey	TKO	6 (10)	1929-02-21	(United Kingdom) Crystal Palace Park, Sydenham, London	
Loss	(Scotland) Alexander Ireland	PTS	15	1928-09-17	(Scotland) Waverley Market, Edinburgh	Lost British & Commonwealth Middleweight Titles.
Win	(Scotland) Tommy Milligan	KO	1 (20)	1928-08-06	(Scotland) Carntyne Stadium, Glasgow	Retained British Middleweight Title.
Loss	(Wales) Gipsy Daniels	PTS	20	1927-04-11	(United Kingdom) The Ring, Southwark, London	
Win	(United Kingdom) Roland Todd	PTS	15	1927-02-16	(United Kingdom) Royal Albert Hall, Kensington, London	Won British & Commonwealth Middleweight Titles.
Win	(Canada) Del Fontaine	NWS	10	1926-08-16	(Canada) Amphitheatre Rink, Winnipeg, Manitoba	Newspaper Decision
Loss	(United States) Dave Shade	PTS	10	1926-04-23	(United States) Syracuse Arena, New York City	
NC	(United States) Dave Shade	NC	5 (10)	1926-04-12	(United States) Syracuse Arena, New York City	
Loss	(United States) Maxie Rosenbloom	PTS	12	1926-02-02	(United States) Pioneer Sporting Club, New York City	
Loss	(United States) Tiger Flowers	PTS	10	1925-12-10	(United States) Mechanics Building, Boston, Massachusetts	
Win	(United Kingdom) Larry Estridge	PTS	12	1925-10-09	(United States) Pioneer Sporting Club, New York City	
Win	(United States) Kid Norfolk	KO	4 (8)	1925-09-21	(United States) Yankee Stadium, Bronx, New York	
Loss	(United States) Jeff Smith	NWS	12	1924-11-11	(United States) Exposition Building, Portland, Maine	Newspaper Decision
Loss	(Canada) Jack Delaney	TKO	6 (12)	1924-08-27	(United States) State Street Arena, Bridgeport, Connecticut	
Loss	(United States) Harry Greb	KO	6 (12)	1924-06-16	(United States) Brassco Park, Waterbury, Connecticut	
Win	(Wales) Gipsy Daniels	PTS	15	1923-07-03	(Wales) White City, Cardiff	
Win	(Canada) Larry Gains	TKO	6 (12)	1924-08-27	(United Kingdom) The Ring, Southwark, London	
Loss	(United Kingdom) Roland Todd	KO	9	1920-12-13	(United Kingdom) Newcastle, Tyne and Wear	
Loss	(United Kingdom) Kid Lewis	KO	1 (15)	1920-01-13	(United Kingdom) Free Trade Hall, Manchester, Lancashire	
Draw	(United Kingdom) Roland Todd	PTS	15	1919-08-02	(United Kingdom) Sheffield, Yorkshire	

== See also ==
- List of British light-heavyweight boxing champions
- List of British middleweight boxing champions

Achievements
Preceded by Roland Todd	British Middleweight Champion; 16 February 1927 – 17 September 1928	Succeeded by Alexander Ireland
Preceded by Roland Todd	Commonwealth Middleweight Champion; 16 February 1927 – 17 September 1928	Succeeded by Alexander Ireland
Vacant Title last held by Gipsy Daniels	British Light Heavyweight Champion; 28 November 1927 – 25 November 1929	Succeeded by Harry Crossley
