= Roland Todd =

English boxer

Personal information
- Nationality: English
- Born: Roland Griffith Todd; 14 January 1900 Marylebone, London, England
- Died: 22 May 1969 (aged 69) Doncaster
- Weight: middle/light heavyweight

Boxing career

Boxing record
- Total fights: 93
- Wins: 63 (KO 30)
- Losses: 24 (KO 6)
- Draws: 5
- No contests: 1

Roland Todd (14 January 1900 — 22 May 1969) born in Marylebone London was an English professional middle/light heavyweight boxer of the 1910s, and 1920s, who won the National Sporting Club (NSC) (subsequently known as the British Boxing Board of Control (BBBofC)) British middleweight title, British Empire middleweight title, and European Boxing Union (EBU) middleweight title.

His professional fighting weight varied from 157 lb (71 kg; 11 st 3 lb), i.e. middleweight to 169 lb (76.7 kg; 12 st 1.0 lb), i.e. light heavyweight.

During his twelve year career Todd fought some of the top boxers of his categories like Harry Greb, Tommy Loughran, Maxie Rosenbloom, Jimmy Slattery, Dave Shade.

After boxing he worked on the railways until his retirement in 1965.

After being knocked down by a car on 18 May 1969 close to his home in Bentley, Doncaster, he never regained consciousness, and died in Doncaster Royal Infirmary on 22 May 1969.

== Boxing career ==
=== Professional ===
Roland Todd's first professional boxing bout was a points draw with Ted Bristowe at Holborn Stadium, London on 26 April 1917, this was followed by fights including; eleven wins, one defeat, then a points defeat by Eddie Shevlin (USA) at London on 18 December 1918, six wins, one defeat.

Todd then had a knockout victory over Harry (Rocky) Knight (Barbados) at The Ring, Southwark, London on 14 June 1919, nine wins, then a knockout victory over Louis Verger (France) at The Ring, Southwark, London on 8 July 1920, four wins, then a technical knockout victory over Eugene Jany (France) at The Ring, Southwark, London on 10 January 1921, two wins, then a knockout victory over Leone Jacovacci (Belgian Congo or French Congo/Italy) at Fulham Baths, Fulham, London on 23 February 1921, seventeen wins, then a retirement victory over Frank Burns (Australia) at Liverpool Stadium on 28 August 1922.

After two new wins, at Holland Park Rink, Kensington, London on 20 November 1922 he had a first chance for the British middleweight title, British Empire middleweight title, and European Boxing Union (EBU) middleweight title against Ted "Kid" Lewis, a much more experienced boxer, and he lost by decision.

But three months later, in the payback with the same Ted "Kid" Lewis for the British middleweight title, British Empire middleweight title, and European Boxing Union (EBU) middleweight title at Royal Albert Hall, London on 15 February 1923, Todd won by decision and conquered the titles.

After a new points victory over Augie Ratner (USA) at Holland Park Rink, Kensington, London on 4 June 1923, Todd then travelled to the United States where, at Madison Square Garden, New York on 10 December 1923, he was defeated by decision by Tommy Loughran, unanimously considered one of the all times greatest light heavyweight champions.

Then he lost by decision against Jock Malone at Mechanics Building, Boston on 18 January 1924, a points win over Allentown Joe Gans at Armory, Wilkes-Barre, Pennsylvania on 31 January 1924, a knockout victory over Jock Malone at Cincinnati on 9 February 1924, a knockout defeat by Jock Malone at Kenwood Armory, Minneapolis on 28 March 1924.

Todd then travelled home to England, one win, then a points defeat by Bruno Frattini (Italy) defending the European Boxing Union (EBU) middleweight title at Palazzo Dello Sport, Milan, Italy on 30 November 1924, one defeat.

Then he recorded a draw with Francis Charles (France) at Cirque de Paris, France on 5 May 1925, a technical knockout victory over Charlie Ring (Australia) at The Ring, Southwark, London on 7 September 1925,

Todd then travelled back to the United States where he had a decision defeat by the great Dave Shade at Madison Square Garden, New York on 1 January 1926.

At Coliseum, Toronto, Canada on 11 January 1926, Todd met another all time legend, the great middle weight champion Harry Greb who defeated him by decision.

Then Todd recorded a defeat by the future light heavyweight world champion Jimmy Slattery at Mechanics Building, Boston on 16 January 1926.

Todd was stripped of the British Middleweight Title on 20 January 1926 for his "refusal to accept justifiable challenges during the past three years.", a points victory over Billy Vidabeck at Jersey City, New Jersey on 16 February 1926, a points defeat by Frankie Campbell at Oakland Auditorium, Oakland, California on 31 March 1926, a draw with Frankie Denny at Oakland Auditorium, Oakland, California on 7 April 1926, a technical knockout defeat by Allentown Joe Gans at Armory, Wilkes-Barre, Pennsylvania on 13 December 1926.

Todd then travelled back home to England, with a knockout victory over Frank Burns (Australia) at Victoria Baths, Nottingham on 13 December 1926, a technical knockout victory over Armando De Carolis (Italy) at Premierland, Whitechapel, London on 2 January 1927.

Later Todd had a points defeat by Frank Moody for the British middleweight title, and British Empire middleweight title, at Royal Albert Hall, London on 16 February 1927, one win, one draw, then a points victory over Gerard Debarbieux (Belgium) at Festival Concert Rooms, York on 23 January 1928, one defeat, then a points defeat by Eugene Alonzo (Martinique) at Westfalenhalle, Dortmund on 11 March 1928.

Then Todd had a points defeat by the hall of famer Maxie Rosenbloom (USA) at Premierland, Whitechapel, London on 17 June 1928.

Then he recorded a knockout defeat by Ted Sandwina (USA) at Premierland, Whitechapel, London on 1 July 1928, a technical knockout defeat by Michele Bonaglia (Italy) at Motovelodromo, Turin, Italy on 14 July 1928, a knockout defeat by Edgar Normann (Norway) at Sportshallen, Oslo, Norway on 19 November 1928.

Roland Todd's final professional boxing bout was a technical knockout defeat by Ted Sandwina (USA) at Liverpool Stadium, on 28 February 1929.

== Genealogical information ==
Roland Todd was the seventh child of Roland Crompton Todd and Elizabeth Todd (née Taylor), their first six children had died at birth, Todd's great-great-grandfather was John "Jack" Musters the squire of Annesley Hall and Colwick Hall in Nottinghamshire and was a prominent boxer in the early 18th century.
