= Doncaster and Bassetlaw Teaching Hospitals NHS Foundation Trust =

- Type: NHS foundation trust
- Established: 1 April 2004
- Headquarters: Armthorpe Road, Doncaster, DN2 5LT
- Region served: South Yorkshire; North Nottinghamshire
- Hospitals: Doncaster Royal Infirmary; Bassetlaw District General Hospital; Montagu Hospital
- Chair: Suzy Brain England
- Chief executive: Richard Parker
- Website: www.dbth.nhs.uk

Doncaster and Bassetlaw Teaching Hospitals NHS Foundation Trust is a NHS foundation trust that provides services at Doncaster Royal Infirmary, Bassetlaw District General Hospital, Montagu Hospital and Retford Hospital, in Nottinghamshire and South Yorkshire, England.

== History ==
The Doncaster and Bassetlaw Hospitals NHS Trust was established in December 2000, taking over services provided by Doncaster Health Authority. The Trust achieved foundation trust status in April 2004.

The Trust issued a contract to the Co-operative Pharmacy for seven years for Doncaster Royal Infirmary's accident and emergency, and outpatient departments in September 2011. A month later it decided to outsource laundry services as it was not able to invest the necessary capital to bring the service up to a satisfactory standard. In January 2017, the trust received Teaching status adding to its name. Mike Pinkerton resigned and Richard Parker took on the role as chief executive.

In January 2017, the Trust announced it would officially become a Teaching Hospitals Trust, supported by both Sheffield Hallam University and the University of Sheffield.

In 2022, 466 of the staff were from outside the UK - 7.6% of all staff at the trust who declared their nationality.

== Performance ==
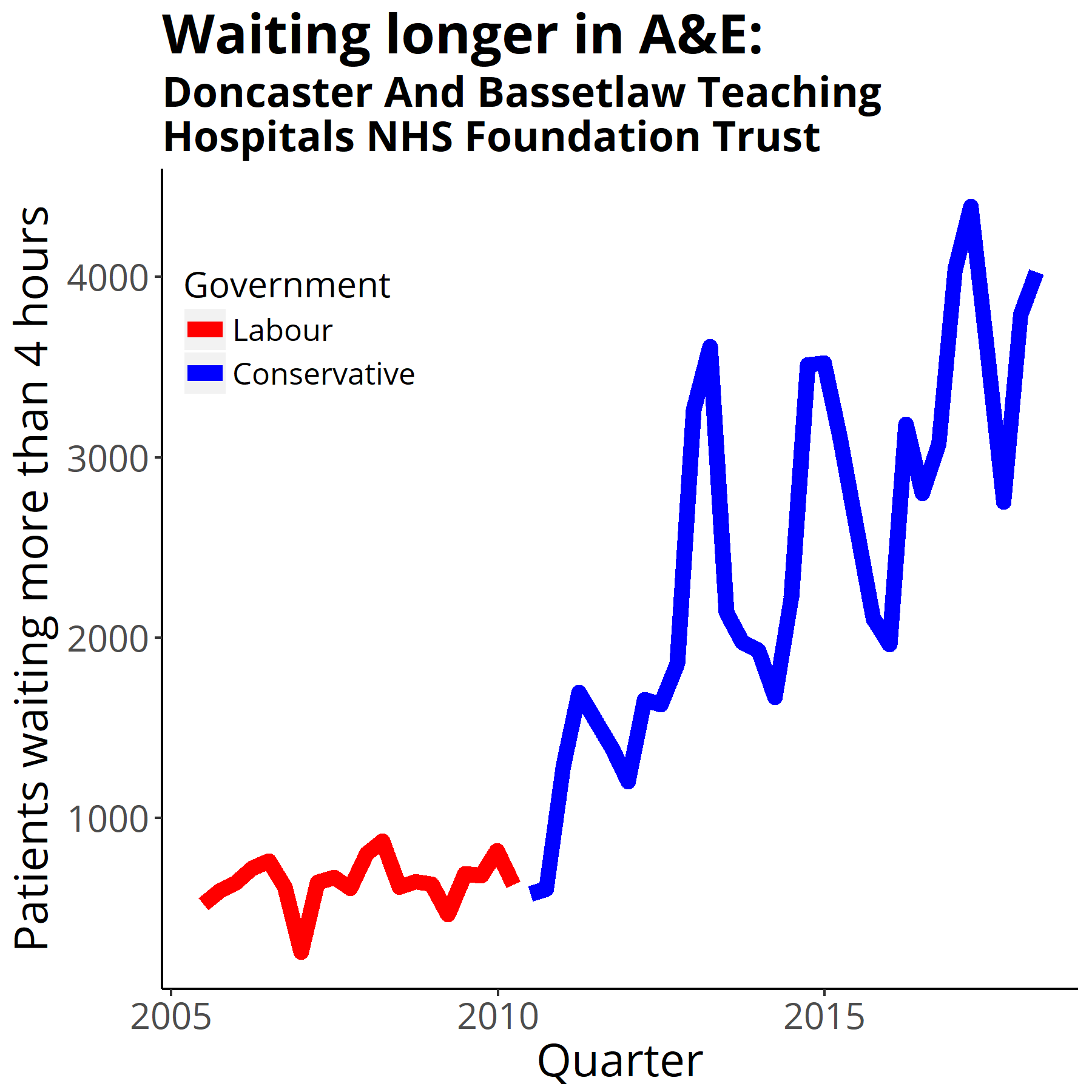
Four-hour target in the emergency department quarterly figures from NHS England Data from https://www.england.nhs.uk/statistics/statistical-work-areas/ae-waiting-times-and-activity/

The Trust was awarded the Baby Friendly Award from UNICEF and the World Health Organisation, for the high standard of care given to pregnant women and breastfeeding mothers and babies in January 2014.

The director of finance resigned in November 2015 after the discovery of inaccuracies in financial reporting. A £12.6m deficit was discovered where a surplus of £2.2 million had been forecast. In February 2016 it was expecting a deficit of £38 million for the year.

The trust started using the DrDoctor text messaging service in ophthalmology, gastroenterology and respiratory services in 2019 and urged patients to ensure their contact details were up-to-date in order to make it effective.

== See also ==
- List of NHS trusts
