= Harry Greb =

American boxer (1894–1926)

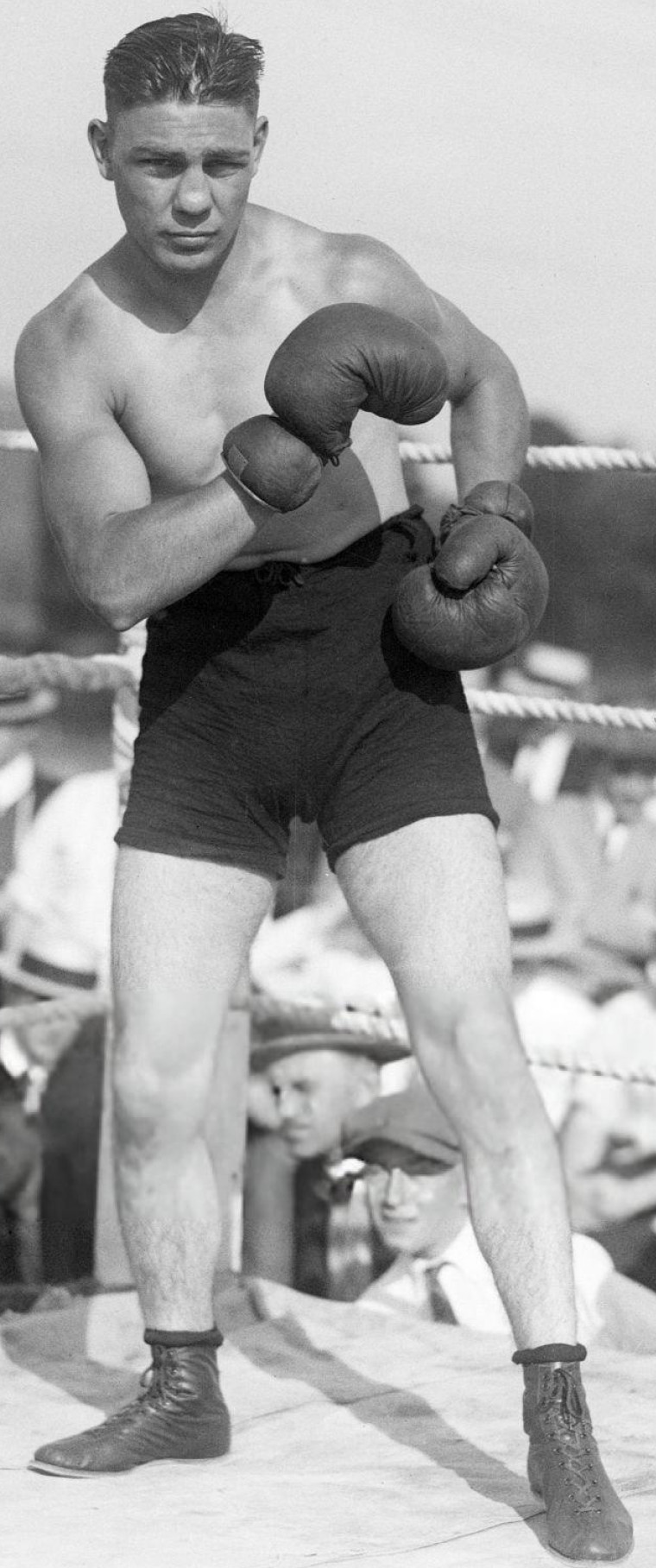

Personal information
- Nicknames: The Pittsburgh Windmill; The Smoke City Wildcat
- Born: Edward Henry Greb; June 6, 1894 Pittsburgh, Pennsylvania, U.S.
- Died: October 22, 1926 (aged 32) Atlantic City, New Jersey, U.S.
- Height: 5 ft 8 in (1.73 m)
- Weight: Middleweight; Light heavyweight

Boxing career
- Reach: 71 in (180 cm)
- Stance: Orthodox

Boxing record
- Total fights: 299; with the inclusion of newspaper decisions
- Wins: 261
- Win by KO: 49
- Losses: 18
- Draws: 19
- No contests: 1

Harry Greb (June 6, 1894 – October 22, 1926) was an American professional boxer who fought from 1913 to 1926, and held the American light heavyweight title from 1922 to 1923 and the world middleweight champion from 1923 to 1926. Nicknamed "the Pittsburgh Windmill", Greb fought 299 times during a 13-year career, taking on any opponent that would fight him, and defeated many of the top rated fighters of his era from welterweight all the way up to heavyweight, and is considered one of the greatest boxers of all time.

Greb was known for his aggressive fighting style and strong chin, and despite his relentless fighting leading him to eventually lose sight in one of his eyes later in his career, he continued to fight on. He holds the record for fighting the most boxing hall of fame opponents, defeating 16 out of 17 of them. Greb is also notable for being one of the only champions of his generation to regularly accept fights against the top rated black fighters of his era. He is ranked by BoxRec as the fourth greatest boxer of all time, pound for pound, as of May 2025 and was also named the fifth best pound-for-pound boxer of all time by Sports Illustrated in 2012.

== Fighting style ==
Greb had a highly aggressive swarming style of fighting, aided by quick movement and notable toughness. He also used dirty fighting tactics, including spinning his opponent and using the heel and laces of his gloves. Greb suffered several injuries in his career, including blindness in one eye. Greb suffered only 2 TKO losses in his career. The first was in his seventh fight when he was knocked out by Joe Chip, who heavily outweighed him; the second happened two years later when Greb broke the radius of his left arm against Kid Graves. Greb finished the round but was unable to continue the fight.

== Professional career ==
Harry Greb was born as Edward Henry Greb to a German immigrant father and mother of German descent, Pius and Annie Greb, who raised him in a working-class household. Greb began his professional boxing career in 1913 under manager James "Red" Mason, fighting mostly around his hometown of Pittsburgh. By 1915, he was fighting world-class opposition, notably Hall of Famer Tommy Gibbons and reigning middleweight champion George Chip, whom he faced twice during 1915–1916 in non-title fights. Greb would lose both fights by "newspaper" decision, which he would later avenge.

Greb would fight 37 times in 1917 (a record), winning 34 of those fights either officially or unofficially. Among his defeated opponents that year were the reigning light heavyweight champion Battling Levinsky (in a non-title fight), former light heavyweight champion Jack Dillon, middleweight George Chip and heavyweight Willie Meehan, who had beaten future heavyweight champion Jack Dempsey earlier in the year.

Despite all these results, Greb was still denied a chance to fight for a title. A February 1918 newspaper draw against Mike O'Dowd, who would go on to win the middleweight title during the year, and a newspaper loss to Billy Miske did not help in his effort. Greb would win his next 52 fights in a row. During that stretch, he beat future light heavyweight champion Mike McTigue, heavyweight contenders Billy Miske, Mike Gibbons, Bill Brennan, Jeff Smith, and Leo Houck 3 times each, and Battling Levinsky no less than four times during that stretch (6 times altogether) in newspaper decisions. Levinsky was the reigning light heavyweight champion at the time.

=== Vision problems ===
In 1921, during a fight with light heavyweight Kid Norfolk, he was thumbed in the right eye, which is believed to have resulted in a retinal tear. The injury would eventually lead to permanent blindness. Greb won via a ten-round newspaper decision and was eligible to fight for the middleweight title. It is commonly believed that Greb completely lost sight in the eye after his fifth bout with Bob Roper, after which it took almost two months to recover. He was seen in a hospital with patches over both eyes. He kept the injury a secret from all but his wife and closest friends, fooling physicians during pre-fight physicals by memorizing the order of the letters on the eye chart (Greb would later lose some vision in his left eye and his gradual loss of sight led him to always go to bed with the light on).

=== Greb vs. Tunney ===
On May 23, 1922, Harry Greb was matched with Gene Tunney, the undefeated American light heavyweight champion. In the first round, Greb immediately fractured Tunney's nose in two places and then proceeded to open a deep gash over his left eye. According to eye-witness reports, Greb was subsequently forced to intermittently commission the referee to wipe off his bloodstained gloves with a towel. Throughout the bout, Greb would repeatedly petition the referee to stop the fight while a determined Tunney concurrently implored him to allow the contest to continue. Round after round, the beating continued, with Tunney refusing to submit and smiling during the bloodshed to keep the referee from halting the match. At the end of fifteen rounds Greb was crowned champion unanimously. This was the first and only professional loss in Tunney's career, with the bout being hailed as the Fight of the Year for 1922 by the Ring Magazine.

After defending his title against Tommy Loughran, Greb granted Tunney a rematch. In a hotly disputed battle at Madison Square Garden in February 1923, Tunney regained his title by a highly controversial split decision. Multiple eyewitness reports state that Greb controlled the fight and battered Tunney, cutting and rocking him from punches on more than one occasion. But Tunney could fight back, unlike in the first encounter, and at some points, was competitive with Greb. The crowd booed heavily when Tunney was announced as the winner.

Greb and Tunney would meet three more times, with Tunney successfully defending his regained title in another fifteen-round about and then fighting to a no-decision newspaper draw, wherein most newspapers reported Greb the winner. Referee Matt Hinkel stated he would have ruled a draw, so the record books have it that way. The fifth battle was reminiscent of the first fight in their series, except this time, it was Tunney bludgeoning Greb for the duration of the bout. According to Tunney, near the end of the match, while the two fighters were locked in a clinch, Greb straightforwardly asked Tunney not to knock him out. Tunney reputedly consented to this request and later acknowledged the incident as the highest tribute he received in his career, stating, "Here was one of the greatest fighters of all time laying down his shield, admitting defeat and knowing I would not expose him." Tunney would go on to beat Jack Dempsey for the heavyweight title. Greb remained the only man ever to have beaten Tunney, and Tunney would be among the pall-bearers at Greb's funeral.

=== Middleweight champion ===
One month after losing his light heavyweight title to Tunney, Greb set his sights on middleweight champion Johnny Wilson; however, when Wilson's manager Marty Killelea refused to offer him the bout, Greb paid a few speakeasy servers in Pittsburgh and New York to serve him water in coloured tumblers and then feigned intoxication in a highly theatrical spectacle. When Killelea witnessed one of these performances, he assumed Greb was ripe for the taking and arranged for the bout to take place. On August 31, 1923, Greb faced Wilson for the world middleweight title, winning a 15-round decision. When referee Jack O'Sullivan stepped in to separate the fighters during a rough clinch, he asked Greb what he thought he was doing. Greb responded, "Gouging Johnny in the eye, can't you see?" Greb would grant Wilson a rematch on January 18, 1924, in Madison Square Garden, winning another 15-round decision.

=== Greb vs. Walker ===
Greb's most notable defense of the title was against the reigning world welterweight champion, Mickey Walker, in July 1925 at the Polo Grounds in New York. Most pundits and even Walker believed Greb would have trouble making the 160lb weight limit. Still, when it was reported that Greb weighed in at 157 1/2 lbs, he was inserted as the 9–5 odds favorite. During the first few rounds of the battle, Walker came out attacking Greb to the body as the defending champion tried to stave off cramps in both his legs. The middle rounds saw Greb starting to relax and control the pace of the bout while Walker could still land some eye-catching combinations. Greb took control during the championship round, and Greb was awarded a unanimous decision by the judges and retained the championship. Walker, who would win the middleweight title the following year, relayed years later a tale that he stumbled upon Greb at a nightclub after their fight, and, according to the legend, the two fought an impromptu rematch there. According to some reports, Greb easily won the spontaneous rematch, while the general consensus is that Walker landed a sucker punch on Greb that knocked him out cold. According to Walker himself, the two were sitting down discussing their fight over a drink when Walker commented that he felt that had it not been for Greb thumbing him in the eye, he would have won the fight. The heavily intoxicated Greb took great offense to this and jumped to his feet to fight. The two fought and ended up outside where several friends of each separated the men.

=== Later career ===
At 32, a waning Greb was years past his best when he was matched with tricky southpaw Tiger Flowers (who was 31 at the time) in Madison Square Garden in February 1926. Flowers, a defensive specialist, countered Greb's attacks well and won a disputed decision after fifteen rounds to take Greb's middleweight title. Flowers beat Greb again in their rematch six months later, on an even more controversial decision, the fans storming the ring to protest the outcome. Greb later stated, "Well, that was one fight I won if I ever won any." The fight would be the last of his career.

== Personal life ==
Harry Greb married Mildred Catherine Reilly on January 19, 1919, in Epiphany Church. They had one child.

== Retirement and death ==
Greb retired following the second Flowers loss and relayed to a friend that he planned on opening a gym in downtown Pittsburgh. In September 1926, his right eye was removed and replaced with a glass prosthesis. Having declined a job as Jack Dempsey's sparring partner in preparation for Dempsey-Tunney I (Greb declaring: "I'd feel like a burglar taking Jack's money. Nobody can get him in good enough condition to whip Gene"), Greb checked into an Atlantic City clinic for surgery to repair damage to his nose and respiratory tract caused by his ring career and several car crashes. The day after surgery, however, complications occurred, and he died of heart failure on October 22, 1926, at 2:30 pm. Greb was buried at Calvary Cemetery in his hometown of Pittsburgh, Pennsylvania.

== Legacy ==
Greb was willing to box African-American fighters, including Jack Blackburn, Kid Norfolk and Tiger Flowers, in an era when many white boxers refused to do so.

Greb has 33 victories over 16 different International Boxing Hall of Famers, more than any other boxer, ranging from welterweight champions to heavyweight champions. Hall of Famers such as Battling Levinsky and Jeff Smith were defeated by Greb six times each. In 1919 alone, he fought 45 fights and went 45–0, which is a record for the most victories in a single calendar year, and an achievement that is highly unlikely to be recreated by contemporary boxers due to changes in the sport.

=== Accolades ===
Greb was enshrined in The Ring magazine Hall of Fame in 1955, Pennsylvania Boxing Hall of Fame in 1958, Western Pennsylvania Sports Hall of Fame in 1970, the World Boxing Hall of Fame in 1980, and the International Boxing Hall of Fame as a first-class inductee in 1990. The Sporting News recognized Greb as the Fighter of the Decade for the 1920s.

Greb is ranked by BoxRec as the fourth greatest fighter of all time, pound for pound. Greb was also named the second greatest fighter of the past 80 years by the Ring Magazine, the third greatest fighter of all time by historian Bert Sugar, the fourth greatest fighter of all time by historian and boxing commentator Max Kellerman and ranked as the #1 middleweight, the #13 light heavyweight, and the #2 pound-for-pound fighter of all time by the International Boxing Research Organization (IBRO) in 2006. In another poll by IBRO in 2019, Greb was ranked once again as the #1 middleweight, the #9 light heavyweight, and the #3 pound-for-pound fighter of all time.

== Professional boxing record ==
All information in this section is derived from BoxRec, unless otherwise stated.

=== Official record ===
299 fights	108 wins	8 losses
By knockout	49	2
By decision	57	5
By disqualification	2	1
Draws	3	
No contests	1	
Newspaper decisions/draws	179	

All newspaper decisions are officially regarded as "no decision" bouts and are not counted in the win/loss/draw column.

No.	Result	Record	Opponent	Type	Round	Date	Location	Notes
299	Loss	108–8–3 (180)	Tiger Flowers	SD	15	Aug 19, 1926	Madison Square Garden, New York City, New York, U.S.	For NYSAC, NBA, and The Ring middleweight titles
298	Win	108–7–3 (180)	Allentown Joe Gans	UD	10	Jun 15, 1926	Artillery Park, Wilkes-Barre, Pennsylvania, U.S.	
297	Win	107–7–3 (180)	Art Weigand	PTS	10	Jun 1, 1926	Broadway Auditorium, Buffalo, New York, U.S.	
296	Loss	106–7–3 (180)	Tiger Flowers	SD	15	Feb 26, 1926	Madison Square Garden, New York City, New York, U.S.	Lost NYSAC, NBA, and The Ring middleweight titles
295	Win	106–6–3 (180)	Owen Phelps	PTS	10	Feb 12, 1926	Capital City Arena, Phoenix, Arizona, U.S.	
294	Win	105–6–3 (180)	Jimmy Delaney	PTS	10	Feb 3, 1923	Oakland Auditorium, Oakland, California, U.S.	
293	Win	104–6–3 (180)	Buck Holley	TKO	5 (10)	Jan 29, 1926	Legion Stadium, Hollywood, California	
292	Win	103–6–3 (180)	Ted Moore	PTS	10	Jan 26, 1926	Los Angeles Arena, Vernon, California, U.S.	
291	Win	102–6–3 (180)	Joe Lohman	PTS	10	Jan 19, 1926	Omaha Auditorium, Omaha, Nebraska, U.S.	
290	Win	101–6–3 (180)	Roland Todd	PTS	12	Jan 11, 1926	Coliseum, Toronto, Ontario, Canada	
289	Win	100–6–3 (180)	Soldier Buck	PTS	8	Dec 14, 1925	Nashville, Tennessee, U.S.	
288	Win	99–6–3 (180)	Tony Marullo	PTS	15	Nov 13, 1925	Coliseum Arena, New Orleans, Louisiana, U.S.	
287	Win	98–6–3 (180)	Tony Marullo	PTS	10	Oct 13, 1925	Motor Square Garden, Pittsburgh, Pennsylvania, U.S.	
286	Win	97–6–3 (180)	Tom Burns	NWS	10	Aug 17, 1925	Fairgrounds Coliseum, Detroit, Michigan, U.S.	
285	Win	97–6–3 (179)	Pat Walsh	TKO	2 (10)	Aug 12, 1925	Atlantic City Airport, Atlantic City, New Jersey, U.S.	
284	Win	96–6–3 (179)	Ed Smith	KO	4 (10)	Aug 4, 1925	Memorial Hall, Kansas City, Kansas, U.S.	
283	Win	95–6–3 (179)	Otis Bryant	TKO	3 (10)	Jul 31, 1925	Floto Outdoor Arena, Tulsa, Oklahoma, U.S.	
282	Win	94–6–3 (179)	Ralph Brooks	NWS	10	Jul 27, 1925	Forum, Wichita, Kansas, U.S.	
281	Win	94–6–3 (178)	Billy Britton	PTS	10	Jul 22, 1925	Anti Horse Thief Association Stock Show, Columbus, Kansas, U.S.	
280	Win	93–6–3 (178)	Maxie Rosenbloom	NWS	10	Jul 16, 1925	Taylor Bowl, Cleveland, Ohio, U.S.	
279	Win	93–6–3 (177)	Mickey Walker	UD	15	Jul 2, 1925	Polo Grounds, New York City, New York, U.S.	Retained NYSAC, NBA, and The Ring middleweight titles
278	Win	92–6–3 (177)	Jimmy Nuss	KO	4 (10)	Jun 5, 1925	Palestra, Marquette, Michigan, U.S.	
277	Win	91–6–3 (177)	Soldier Buck	NWS	10	Jun 1, 1925	Jefferson County Armory, Louisville, Kentucky, U.S.	
276	Win	91–6–3 (176)	Tom Burns	NWS	10	May 29, 1925	Tomlinson Hall, Indianapolis, Indiana, U.S.	
275	Win	91–6–3 (175)	Billy Britton	PTS	12	May 6, 1925	Fairmont Arena, Columbus, Ohio, U.S.	
274	Win	90–6–3 (175)	Quintin Romero Rojas	PTS	10	May 1, 1925	Arena Gardens, Detroit, Michigan, U.S.	
273	Win	89–6–3 (175)	Jack Reddick	PTS	10	Apr 24, 1925	Arena Gardens, Toronto, Ontario, Canada	
272	Win	88–6–3 (175)	Johnny Wilson	PTS	10	Apr 17, 1925	Commercial A.C., Boston, Massachusetts, U.S.	
271	Loss	87–6–3 (175)	Gene Tunney	NWS	10	Mar 27, 1925	Saint Paul Auditorium, Saint Paul, Minnesota	
270	Win	87–6–3 (174)	Young Fisher	DQ	6 (10)	Feb 23, 1925	Town Hall, Scranton, Pennsylvania, U.S.	
269	Win	86–6–3 (174)	Billy Britton	PTS	10	Feb 17, 1925	Allentown, Pennsylvania, U.S.	
268	Win	85–6–3 (174)	Jimmy Delaney	NWS	10	Jan 30, 1925	Auditorium, Saint Paul, Minnesota, U.S.	
267	Win	85–6–3 (173)	Johnny Papke	TKO	7 (12)	Jan 19, 1925	Weller Theater, Zanesville, Ohio, U.S.	
266	Win	84–6–3 (173)	Bob Sage	NWS	10	Jan 9, 1925	Arena Gardens, Detroit, Michigan, U.S.	
265	Win	84–6–3 (172)	Augie Ratner	PTS	10	Jan 1, 1925	Motor Square Garden, Pittsburgh, Pennsylvania, U.S.	
264	Win	83–6–3 (172)	Frankie Ritz	TKO	3 (10)	Nov 25, 1924	Wheeling, West Virginia, U.S.	
263	Win	82–6–3 (172)	Jimmy Delaney	PTS	10	Nov 17, 1924	Motor Square Garden, Pittsburgh, Pennsylvania, U.S.	
262	Win	81–6–3 (172)	Ray Nelson	KO	3 (6)	Nov 11, 1924	Midway Auditorium, Philipsburg, Pennsylvania, U.S	
261	Draw	80–6–3 (172)	Tommy Loughran	SD	10	Oct 13, 1924	Philadelphia Arena, Philadelphia, Pennsylvania, U.S.	
260	Draw	80–6–2 (172)	Gene Tunney	NWS	10	Sep 17, 1924	Olympic Arena, Cleveland, Ohio, U.S.	
259	Win	80–6–2 (171)	Billy Hirsch	TKO	8 (10)	Sep 15, 1924	Wabash Park, Mingo Junction, Ohio, U.S.	
258	Win	79–6–2 (171)	Jimmy Slattery	PTS	6	Sep 3, 1924	Bison Stadium, Buffalo, New York, U.S.	
257	Win	78–6–2 (171)	Tiger Flowers	NWS	10	Aug 21, 1924	Legion Stadium, Fremont, Ohio, U.S.	
256	Win	78–6–2 (170)	Ted Moore	UD	15	Jun 26, 1924	Yankee Stadium, Bronx, New York City, New York, U.S.	Retained NYSAC, NBA, and The Ring middleweight titles
255	Win	77–6–2 (170)	Frank Moody	KO	6 (12)	Jun 16, 1924	Brassco Park, Waterbury, Connecticut, U.S.	
254	Win	76–6–2 (170)	Martin Burke	NWS	10	Jun 12, 1924	Olympic Arena, Brooklyn, New York City, New York, U.S.	
253	Win	76–6–2 (169)	Pal Reed	PTS	10	May 12, 1924	Motor Square Garden, Pittsburgh, Pennsylvania, U.S.	
252	Win	75–6–2 (169)	Jackie Clark	TKO	2 (12)	May 5, 1924	Ben Franklin Arena, Kenilworth, Maryland, U.S.	
251	Loss	74–6–2 (169)	Kid Norfolk	DQ	6 (10)	Apr 19, 1924	Commercial A.C., Boston, Massachusetts, U.S.	
250	Win	74–5–2 (169)	Fay Keiser	TKO	12 (15)	Mar 24, 1924	104th Regiment Armory, Baltimore, Maryland, U.S.	
249	Win	73–5–2 (169)	Jack Reeves	PTS	4	Feb 22, 1924	Oakland Auditorium, Oakland, California, U.S.	
248	Win	72–5–2 (169)	Johnny Wilson	UD	15	Jan 18, 1924	Madison Square Garden, New York City, New York, U.S.	Retained NYSAC, NBA, and The Ring middleweight titles
247	Win	71–5–2 (169)	Tommy Loughran	PTS	10	Dec 25, 1923	Motor Square Garden, Pittsburgh, Pennsylvania, U.S.	
246	Loss	70–5–2 (169)	Gene Tunney	UD	15	Dec 10, 1923	Madison Square Garden, New York City, New York, U.S.	For ABA light-heavyweight title
245	Win	70–4–2 (169)	Bryan Downey	UD	10	Dec 3, 1923	Motor Square Garden, Pittsburgh, Pennsylvania, U.S.	Retained NYSAC and NBA middleweight titles
244	Win	69–4–2 (169)	Chuck Wiggins	NWS	10	Nov 15, 1923	Armory, Grand Rapids, Michigan, U.S.	
243	Win	69–4–2 (168)	Soldier Jones	NWS	10	Nov 5, 1923	Motor Square Garden, Pittsburgh, Pennsylvania, U.S.	
242	Win	69–4–2 (167)	Lou Bogash	NWS	12	Oct 22, 1923	1st Regiment Armory, Newark, New Jersey, U.S.	
241	Loss	69–4–2 (166)	Tommy Loughran	PTS	10	Oct 11, 1923	Commercial A.C., Boston, Massachusetts, U.S.	
240	Win	69–3–2 (166)	Jimmy Darcy	NWS	10	Oct 4, 1923	Forbes Field, Pittsburgh, Pennsylvania, U.S.	
239	Win	69–3–2 (165)	Johnny Wilson	UD	15	Aug 31, 1923	Polo Grounds, New York City, New York, U.S.	Won NYSAC and NBA middleweight titles
238	Win	68–3–2 (165)	Len Rowlands	KO	3 (10)	Jun 16, 1923	Craft's Five Acres, Uniontown, Pennsylvania, U.S.	
237	Loss	67–3–2 (165)	Gene Tunney	SD	15	Feb 23, 1923	Madison Square Garden, New York City, New York, U.S.	Lost ABA light-heavyweight title
236	Win	67–2–2 (165)	Young Fisher	PTS	12	Feb 16, 1923	Syracuse Arena, New York City, New York, U.S.	
235	Win	66–2–2 (165)	Pal Reed	NWS	12	Feb 5, 1923	Broad A.C., Newark, New Jersey, U.S.	
234	Win	66–2–2 (164)	Tommy Loughran	UD	15	Jan 30, 1923	Madison Square Garden, New York City, New York, U.S.	Retained ABA light-heavyweight title
233	Win	65–2–2 (164)	Billy Shade	NWS	12	Jan 22, 1923	4th Regiment Armory, Jersey City, New Jersey, U.S.	
232	Win	65–2–2 (163)	Tommy Loughran	NWS	10	Jan 15, 1923	Motor Square Garden, Pittsburgh, Pennsylvania, U.S.	
231	Win	65–2–2 (162)	Bob Roper	NWS	10	Jan 1, 1923	Motor Square Garden, Pittsburgh, Pennsylvania, U.S.	
230	Win	65–2–2 (161)	Bob Roper	PTS	12	Nov 10, 1922	Broadway Auditorium, Buffalo, New York, U.S.	
229	Win	64–2–2 (161)	Larry Williams	TKO	4 (12)	Oct 27, 1922	Marieville Gardens, North Providence, Rhode Island, U.S>	
228	Win	63–2–2 (161)	Bob Roper	NWS	10	Sep 29, 1922	Armory, Grand Rapids, Michigan, U.S.	
227	Win	63–2–2 (160)	Al Benedict	TKO	2 (10)	Sep 26, 1922	Coliseum, Toronto, Ontario, Canada	
226	Win	62–2–2 (160)	Tommy Loughran	NWS	8	Jul 10, 1922	Shibe Park, Philadelphia, Pennsylvania, U.S.	
225	Win	62–2–2 (159)	Hugh Walker	NWS	10	Jun 26, 1922	Forbes Field, Pittsburgh, Pennsylvania, U.S.	
224	Win	62–2–2 (158)	Gene Tunney	UD	15	May 23, 1922	Madison Square Garden, New York City, New York, U.S.	Won ABA light-heavyweight title
223	Win	61–2–2 (158)	Al Roberts	KO	6 (10)	May 12, 1922	Boston Arena, Boston, Massachusetts, U.S.	
222	Win	60–2–2 (158)	Tommy Gibbons	UD	15	Mar 13, 1922	Madison Square Garden, New York City, New York, U.S.	
221	Win	59–2–2 (158)	Jeff Smith	NWS	10	Feb 20, 1922	Freeman Avenue Armory, Cincinnati, Ohio, U.S.	
220	Win	59–2–2 (157)	Hugh Walker	NWS	10	Feb 1, 1922	Armory, Grand Rapids, Michigan, U.S.	
219	Win	59–2–2 (156)	Chuck Wiggins	NWS	10	Jan 2, 1922	Heuck's Opera House, Cincinnati, Ohio, U.S.	
218	Win	59–2–2 (155)	Whitey Allen	TKO	6 (10)	Dec 23, 1921	Syracuse Arena, Syracuse, New York, U.S.	
217	Win	58–2–2 (155)	Fay Keiser	NWS	8	Dec 6, 1921	Ice Palace, Philadelphia, Pennsylvania, U.S.	
216	Win	58–2–2 (154)	Homer Smith	TKO	5 (12)	Nov 25, 1921	Newark Athletic Club, Newark, New Jersey, U.S.	
215	Win	57–2–2 (154)	Billy Shade	NWS	10	Nov 11, 1921	Motor Square Garden, Pittsburgh, Pennsylvania, U.S.	
214	Win	57–2–2 (153)	Charley Weinert	PTS	15	Nov 4, 1921	Madison Square Garden, New York City, New York, U.S.	
213	Win	56–2–2 (153)	Jimmy Darcy	UD	10	Oct 24, 1921	Broadway Auditorium, Buffalo, New York, U.S.	
212	Win	55–2–2 (153)	Joe Cox	PTS	12	Sep 20, 1921	Palace of Joy, Brooklyn, New York City, New York, U.S.	
211	Win	54–2–2 (153)	Chuck Wiggins	NWS	10	Sep 5, 1921	Huntington, West Virginia, U.S.	
210	Win	54–2–2 (152)	Kid Norfolk	NWS	10	Aug 29, 1921	Forbes Field, Philadelphia, Pennsylvania, U.S.	
209	Draw	54–2–2 (151)	Chuck Wiggins	NWS	10	Jun 23, 1921	Three-I League Park, Terre Haute, Indiana, U.S.	
208	Draw	54–2–2 (150)	Chuck Wiggins	NWS	10	May 28, 1921	Springbrook Park, South Bend, Indiana, U.S.	
207	Draw	54–2–2 (149)	Jeff Smith	PTS	15	May 20, 1921	Louisiana Auditorium, New Orleans, Louisiana, U.S.	
206	Win	54–2–1 (149)	Jimmy Darcy	PTS	10	May 13, 1921	Boston Arena, Boston, Massachusetts, U.S.	
205	Win	53–2–1 (149)	Bartley Madden	NWS	10	May 4, 1921	Motor Square Garden, Pittsburgh, Pennsylvania, U.S.	
204	Win	53–2–1 (148)	Soldier Jones	KO	4 (10)	Apr 11, 1921	The Armouries, Toronto, Ontario, Canada	
203	Win	52–2–1 (148)	Jack Renault	NWS	10	Apr 6, 1921	Mount Royal Arena, Montreal, Canada	
202	Win	52–2–1 (147)	Happy Littleton	PTS	15	Apr 1, 1921	Louisiana Auditorium, New Orleans, Louisiana, U.S.	
201	Win	51–2–1 (147)	Jack Renault	PTS	10	Mar 16, 1921	Exposition Hall, Pittsburgh, Pennsylvania, U.S.	
200	Win	51–2–1 (146)	Jeff Smith	PTS	10	Feb 25, 1921	Commercial A.C., Boston, Massachusetts, U.S.	
199	Win	50–2–1 (146)	Pal Reed	PTS	10	Jan 29, 1921	Commercial A.C., Boston, Massachusetts, U.S.	
198	Win	49–2–1 (146)	Johnny Celmars	NWS	10	Jan 20, 1921	Dallas, Texas, U.S.	
197	Win	49–2–1 (145)	Jeff Smith	NWS	10	Dec 25, 1920	Motor Square Garden, Pittsburgh, Pennsylvania, U.S.	
196	Win	49–2–1 (144)	Bob Roper	PTS	10	Dec 21, 1920	Commercial A.C., Boston, Massachusetts, U.S.	
195	Win	48–2–1 (144)	Jack Duffy	TKO	6 (10)	Dec 11, 1920	Motor Square Garden, Pittsburgh, Pennsylvania, U.S.	
194	Win	47–2–1 (144)	Bob Moha	NWS	10	Nov 22, 1920	Auditorium, Milwaukee, Wisconsin, U.S.	
193	Win	47–2–1 (143)	Bartley Madden	NWS	10	Nov 10, 1920	National Guard Armory, Kalamazoo, Michigan, U.S.	
192	Win	47–2–1 (142)	Mickey Shannon	NWS	10	Oct 28, 1920	Exposition Hall, Pittsburgh, Pennsylvania, U.S.	
191	Win	47–2–1 (141)	Gunboat Smith	KO	1 (10)	Oct 21, 1920	Springbrook Park, South Bend, Indiana, U.S.	
190	Win	46–2–1 (141)	Ted Jamieson	TKO	6 (10)	Sep 22, 1920	Milwaukee Auditorium, Milwaukee, Wisconsin, U.S.	
189	Win	45–2–1 (141)	Chuck Wiggins	NWS	6	Sep 6, 1920	Floyd Fitzsimmons Arena, Benton Harbor, Michigan, U.S.	
188	Win	45–2–1 (140)	Ted Jamieson	NWS	10	Aug 28, 1920	Ramona Baseball Park, Grand Rapids, Michigan, U.S.	
187	Win	45–2–1 (139)	Chuck Wiggins	NWS	10	Aug 20, 1920	National Guard Armory, Kalamazoo, Michigan, U.S.	
186	Win	45–2–1 (138)	Bob Moha	NWS	10	Aug 14, 1920	Cedar Point Arena, Sandusky, Ohio, U.S.	
185	Win	45–2–1 (137)	Tommy Gibbons	NWS	10	Jul 31, 1920	Forbes Field, Pittsburgh, Pennsylvania, U.S.	
184	Win	45–2–1 (136)	Larry Williams	NWS	10	Jul 8, 1920	Bison Stadium, Buffalo, New York, U.S.	
183	Win	45–2–1 (135)	Bob Moha	NWS	12	Jul 5, 1920	Canton Auditorium, Canton, Ohio, U.S.	
182	Win	45–2–1 (134)	Frank Carbone	NWS	10	Jun 28, 1920	Convention Hall, Rochester, New York, U.S.	
181	Win	45–2–1 (133)	Clay Turner	NWS	8	Jun 2, 1920	Ice Palace, Philadelphia, Pennsylvania, U.S.	
180	Loss	45–2–1 (132)	Tommy Gibbons	NWS	10	May 15, 1920	Forbes Field, Pittsburgh, Pennsylvania, U.S.	
179	Win	45–2–1 (131)	Bob Roper	PTS	12	Apr 5, 1920	Stockyards Stadium, Denver, Colorado, U.S.	
178	Win	44–2–1 (131)	George K.O. Brown	PTS	12	Mar 25, 1920	Stockyards Stadium, Denver, Colorado, U.S.	
177	Win	43–2–1 (131)	Larry Williams	NWS	10	Mar 22, 1920	Exposition Hall, Pittsburgh, Pennsylvania, U.S.	
176	Win	43–2–1 (130)	Tommy Robson	PTS	12	Mar 17, 1920	Industries Building, Dayton, Ohio, U.S.	
175	Win	42–2–1 (130)	Clay Turner	NWS	12	Mar 9, 1920	Armory, Akron, Ohio, U.S.	
174	Win	42–2–1 (129)	Bob Roper	NWS	10	Feb 21, 1920	Exposition Hall, Pittsburgh, Pennsylvania, U.S.	
173	Win	42–2–1 (128)	Zulu Kid	NWS	10	Feb 6, 1920	National Guard Armory, Kalamazoo, Michigan, U.S.	
172	Win	42–2–1 (127)	Clay Turner	NWS	6	Dec 22, 1919	Olympia A.C., Philadelphia, Pennsylvania, U.S.	
171	Win	42–2–1 (126)	Billy Kramer	NWS	10	Dec 15, 1919	Southside Market House, Pittsburgh, Pennsylvania, U.S.	
170	Win	42–2–1 (125)	Mike McTigue	NWS	10	Dec 12, 1919	Ideal Park Pavilion, Endicott, New York, U.S.	
169	Win	42–2–1 (124)	Clay Turner	NWS	10	Dec 10, 1919	Broadway Auditorium, Buffalo, New York, U.S.	
168	Win	42–2–1 (123)	Soldier Jones	KO	5 (10)	Nov 28, 1919	Broadway Auditorium, Buffalo, New York, U.S.	
167	Win	41–2–1 (123)	Zulu Kid	NWS	10	Nov 27, 1919	Nonpareil A.C., Beaver Falls, Pennsylvania, U.S.	
166	Win	41–2–1 (122)	Larry Williams	NWS	10	Nov 24, 1919	Southside Market House, Pittsburgh, Pennsylvania, U.S.	
165	Win	41–2–1 (121)	George K.O. Brown	NWS	12	Nov 17, 1919	Canton Auditorium, Canton, Ohio, U.S.	
164	Win	41–2–1 (120)	Sailor Ed Petroskey	NWS	6	Oct 13, 1919	Olympia A.C., Philadelphia, Pennsylvania, U.S.	
163	Win	41–2–1 (119)	Silent Martin	NWS	8	Sep 18, 1919	Coliseum, Saint Louis, Missouri, U.S.	
162	Win	41–2–1 (118)	Battling Levinsky	NWS	10	Sep 3, 1919	Wheeling, West Virginia, U.S.	ABA and world light-heavyweight titles at stake; (via KO only)
161	Win	41–2–1 (117)	Jeff Smith	NWS	12	Sep 1, 1919	Idora Park, Youngstown, Ohio, U.S.	
160	Win	41–2–1 (116)	Bill Brennan	NWS	10	Aug 23, 1919	Forbes Field, Pittsburgh, Pennsylvania, U.S.	
159	Win	41–2–1 (115)	Terry Kellar	PTS	15	Aug 11, 1919	Highland Park, Dayton, Ohio, U.S.	
158	Win	41–2–1 (115)	Joe Chip	NWS	12	Jul 24, 1919	Idora Park, Youngstown, Ohio, U.S.	
157	Win	40–2–1 (114)	George K.O. Brown	NWS	10	Jul 16, 1919	Wheeling Park, Wheeling, West Virginia, U.S.	
156	Win	40–2–1 (113)	Battling Levinsky	NWS	6	Jul 14, 1919	Shibe Park, Philadelphia, Pennsylvania	
155	Win	40–2–1 (112)	Bill Brennan	PTS	15	Jul 4, 1919	Convention Hall, Tulsa, Oklahoma, U.S.	
154	Win	39–2–1 (112)	Mike Gibbons	NWS	10	Jun 23, 1919	Forbes Field, Philadelphia, Pennsylvania, U.S.	
153	Win	39–2–1 (111)	Yankee Gilbert	TKO	4 (10)	Jun 20, 1919	Wheeling, West Virginia, U.S.	
152	Win	38–2–1 (111)	Happy Howard	NWS	10	Jun 18, 1919	Carney Auditorium, Erie, Pennsylvania, U.S.	
151	Win	38–2–1 (110)	Joe Borrell	TKO	5 (6)	Jun 16, 1919	Shibe Park, Philadelphia, Pennsylvania, U.S.	
150	Win	37–2–1 (110)	Tommy Robson	NWS	10	May 26, 1919	Arena, Syracuse, New York, U.S.	
149	Win	37–2–1 (109)	Bartley Madden	NWS	10	May 13, 1919	Broadway Auditorium, Buffalo, New York, U.S.	
148	Win	37–2–1 (108)	Willie Meehan	NWS	10	May 8, 1919	Duquesne Garden, Pittsburgh, Pennsylvania, U.S.	
147	Win	37–2–1 (107)	Clay Turner	PTS	12	May 6, 1919	Boston, Massachusetts, U.S.	
146	Win	36–2–1 (107)	Battling Levinsky	NWS	12	Apr 28, 1919	Canton Auditorium, Canton, Ohio, U.S.	
145	Win	36–2–1 (106)	Leo Houck	NWS	10	Apr 25, 1919	Carney Auditorium, Erie, Pennsylvania, U.S.	
144	Win	36–2–1 (105)	George Davis	NWS	10	Apr 8, 1919	Broadway Auditorium, Buffalo, New York, U.S.	
143	Win	36–2–1 (104)	Young Fisher	NWS	10	Apr 7, 1919	Arena, Syracuse, New York, U.S.	
142	Win	36–2–1 (103)	Tommy Madden	KO	2 (10)	Apr 2, 1919	Majestic Theater, Butler, Pennsylvania, U.S.	
141	Win	35–2–1 (103)	Billy Miske	NWS	10	Mar 31, 1919	Duquesne Garden, Erie, Pennsylvania, U.S.	
140	Win	35–2–1 (102)	Happy Howard	NWS	10	Mar 25, 1919	Cambria Theatre, Johnstown, Pennsylvania, U.S.	
139	Win	35–2–1 (101)	Bill Brennan	NWS	10	Mar 17, 1919	Duquesne Garden, Pittsburgh, Pennsylvania, U.S.	
138	Win	35–2–1 (100)	Leo Houck	NWS	6	Mar 6, 1919	Fulton Opera House, Lancaster, Pennsylvania, U.S.	
137	Win	35–2–1 (99)	Chuck Wiggins	NWS	8	Mar 3, 1919	Elks Auditorium, Detroit, Michigan, U.S.	
136	Win	35–2–1 (98)	Chuck Wiggins	NWS	12	Feb 28, 1919	Coliseum, Toledo, Ohio, U.S.	
135	Win	35–2–1 (97)	Battling Levinsky	NWS	10	Feb 17, 1919	Broadway Auditorium, Buffalo, New York, U.S.	ABA and NYSAC light-heavyweight titles at stake; (via KO only)
134	Win	35–2–1 (96)	Bill Brennan	NWS	10	Feb 10, 1919	Arena, Syracuse, New York, U.S.	
133	Win	35–2–1 (95)	Len Rowlands	TKO	4 (10)	Feb 3, 1919	Southside Market House, Pittsburgh, Pennsylvania, U.S.	
132	Win	34–2–1 (95)	Tommy Robson	NWS	10	Jan 31, 1919	Cleveland A.C., Cleveland, Ohio, U.S.	
131	Win	34–2–1 (94)	Jakob "Soldier" Bartfield	NWS	12	Jan 27, 1919	Memorial Hall, Columbus, Ohio, U.S.	
130	Win	34–2–1 (93)	Paul Samson-Körner	NWS	10	Jan 23, 1919	Southside Market House, Pittsburgh, Pennsylvania, U.S.	
129	Win	34–2–1 (92)	Young Fisher	NWS	10	Jan 20, 1919	Grand Opera House, Syracuse, New York, U.S.	
128	Win	34–2–1 (91)	Leo Houck	PTS	12	Jan 14, 1919	Boston Arena, Boston, Massachusetts, U.S.	
127	Loss	33–2–1 (91)	Billy Miske	NWS	10	Sep 21, 1918	Forbes Field, Pittsburgh, Pennsylvania	
126	Win	33–2–1 (90)	Clay Turner	NWS	8	Aug 9, 1918	Ballpark, Jersey City, New Jersey, U.S.	
125	Win	33–2–1 (89)	Battling Levinsky	NWS	6	Aug 6, 1918	Shibe Park, Philadelphia, Pennsylvania, U.S.	
124	Win	33–2–1 (88)	Eddie McGoorty	PTS	10	Jul 27, 1918	Fort Sheridan, Illinois, U.S.	
123	Draw	32–2–1 (88)	Jakob "Soldier" Bartfield	NWS	6	Jul 16, 1918	Shibe Park, Philadelphia, Pennsylvania, U.S.	
122	Win	32–2–1 (87)	Bob Moha	NWS	10	Jul 4, 1918	Douglas Park, Rock Island, Illinois, U.S.	
121	Win	32–2–1 (86)	Frank Carbone	NWS	15	Jun 24, 1918	Casino Hall, Bridgeport, Connecticut, U.S.	
120	Win	32–2–1 (85)	Zulu Kid	NWS	6	Jun 20, 1918	Madison Square Garden, New York City, New York, U.S.	
119	Win	32–2–1 (84)	Jakob "Soldier" Bartfield	NWS	15	May 29, 1918	Swayne Field, Toledo, Ohio, U.S.	
118	Win	32–2–1 (83)	Jakob "Soldier" Bartfield	NWS	10	May 20, 1918	Forbes Field, Pittsburgh, Pennsylvania, U.S.	
117	Win	32–2–1 (82)	Clay Turner	NWS	15	May 15, 1918	Casino Hall, Bridgeport, Connecticut, U.S.	
116	Win	32–2–1 (81)	Al McCoy	PTS	10	May 13, 1918	People's Theater, Cincinnati, Ohio, U.S.	
115	Win	31–2–1 (81)	Willie Langford	NWS	6	Mar 18, 1918	Broadway Auditorium, Buffalo, New York, U.S.	
114	Win	31–2–1 (80)	Mike McTigue	NWS	10	Mar 11, 1918	Moose Hall, Cleveland, Ohio, U.S.	
113	Win	31–2–1 (79)	Jack Dillon	NWS	12	Mar 4, 1918	Toledo Coliseum, Toledo, Ohio, U.S.	
112	Draw	31–2–1 (78)	Mike O'Dowd	NWS	10	Feb 25, 1918	Saint Paul Auditorium, Saint Paul, Minnesota, U.S.	NYSAC middleweight title at stake; (via KO only)
111	Win	31–2–1 (77)	Bob Moha	PTS	10	Feb 18, 1918	People's Theater, Cincinnati, Ohio, U.S.	
110	Win	30–2–1 (77)	Jack Hubbard	KO	3 (10)	Feb 4, 1918	Lonaconing, Maryland, U.S.	
109	Win	29–2–1 (77)	Zulu Kid	NWS	14 (15)	Jan 29, 1918	Casino Hall, Bridgeport, Connecticut, U.S.	Halted near end of round 14 because of local law, requiring performances to end by 10:30 p.m.
108	Win	29–2–1 (76)	Augie Ratner	PTS	20	Jan 21, 1918	Dauphine Theater, New Orleans, Louisiana, U.S.	
107	Win	28–2–1 (76)	Battling Kopin	KO	1 (10)	Jan 14, 1918	Skating Rink, Charleroi, Pennsylvania, U.S.	
106	Win	27–2–1 (76)	Terry Kellar	NWS	10	Jan 4, 1918	Orpheum Theater, McKeesport, Pennsylvania, U.S.	
105	Win	27–2–1 (75)	Whitey Wenzel	NWS	10	Dec 25, 1917	Turner Hall, Homestead, Pennsylvania, U.S.	
104	Win	27–2–1 (74)	Gus Christie	PTS	12	Dec 17, 1917	Heuck's Opera House, Cincinnati, Ohio, U.S.	
103	Win	26–2–1 (74)	Terry Martin	KO	3 (10)	Dec 8, 1917	Skating Rink, Charleroi, Pennsylvania, U.S.	
102	Win	25–2–1 (74)	George Ashe	NWS	10	Dec 5, 1917	Cambria Theatre, Johnstown, Pennsylvania, U.S.	
101	Win	25–2–1 (73)	Willie Meehan	NWS	6	Dec 3, 1917	Olympia A.C., Philadelphia, Pennsylvania, U.S.	
100	Win	25–2–1 (72)	George Chip	PTS	10	Nov 19, 1917	Heuck's Opera House, Cincinnati, Ohio, U.S.	
99	Loss	24–2–1 (72)	Jakob "Soldier" Bartfield	NWS	10	Nov 2, 1917	Broadway Auditorium, Buffalo, New York, U.S.	
98	Win	24–2–1 (71)	Gus Christie	PTS	8	Oct 23, 1917	Armory, Chattanooga, Tennessee, U.S.	
97	Win	23–2–1 (71)	Len Rowlands	NWS	10	Oct 19, 1917	Auditorium, Milwaukee, Wisconsin, U.S.	
96	Win	23–2–1 (70)	Gus Christie	NWS	10	Oct 11, 1917	Broadway Auditorium, Buffalo, New York, U.S.	
95	Win	23–2–1 (69)	Billy Kramer	NWS	6	Oct 6, 1917	National A.C., Pittsburgh, Pennsylvania, U.S.	
94	Win	23–2–1 (68)	Johnny Howard	TKO	9 (10)	Sep 25, 1917	Broadway S.C., Brooklyn, New York City, New York, U.S.	
93	Win	22–2–1 (68)	Battling Kopin	TKO	3 (10)	Sep 22, 1917	Skating Rink, Charleroi, Pennsylvania, U.S.	
92	Win	21–2–1 (68)	George K.O. Brown	TKO	9 (10)	Sep 17, 1917	Highland Park, Dayton, Ohio, U.S.	
91	Win	20–2–1 (68)	Jack London	TKO	9 (10)	Sep 14, 1917	St. Nicholas Arena, New York City, New York, U.S.	
90	Win	19–2–1 (68)	Jeff Smith	NWS	10	Sep 11, 1917	Auditorium, Milwaukee, Wisconsin, U.S.	
89	Win	19–2–1 (67)	Battling Levinsky	NWS	10	Sep 6, 1917	Forbes Field, Philadelphia, Pennsylvania, U.S.	
88	Win	19–2–1 (66)	Jack Dillon	NWS	10	Jul 30, 1917	Forbes Field, Philadelphia, Pennsylvania, U.S.	
87	Win	19–2–1 (65)	Buck Crouse	TKO	6 (10)	Jul 2, 1917	Exposition Hall, Pittsburgh, Pennsylvania, U.S.	
86	Win	18–2–1 (65)	Frank Mantell	KO	1 (10)	Jun 14, 1917	West End Theatre, Uniontown, Pennsylvania, U.S.	
85	Win	17–2–1 (65)	George Chip	NWS	10	May 22, 1917	Exposition Hall, Pittsburgh, Pennsylvania, U.S.	
84	Win	17–2–1 (64)	Jeff Smith	NWS	10	May 19, 1917	Broadway Auditorium, Buffalo, New York, U.S.	
83	Win	17–2–1 (63)	Harry Baker	KO	5 (10)	May 9, 1917	West End Theatre, Uniontown, Pennsylvania, U.S.	
82	Draw	16–2–1 (63)	Jackie Clark	PTS	20	May 3, 1917	Cumberland, Maryland, U.S.	
81	Win	16–2 (63)	Al McCoy	NWS	10	Apr 30, 1917	Exposition Hall, Pittsburgh, Pennsylvania, U.S.	
80	Win	16–2 (62)	Zulu Kid	NWS	6	Apr 16, 1917	Power Auditorium, Pittsburgh, Pennsylvania, U.S.	Not to be confused with Young Zulu Kid
79	Win	16–2 (61)	Al Rogers	NWS	10	Apr 14, 1917	Skating Rink, Charleroi, Pennsylvania, U.S.	
78	Win	16–2 (60)	Young Ahearn	KO	1 (6)	Apr 2, 1917	Power Auditorium, Pittsburgh, Pennsylvania, U.S.	
77	Win	15–2 (60)	Young Herman Miller	TKO	5 (10)	Mar 23, 1917	Southside Casino, Johnstown, Pennsylvania, U.S.	
76	Win	14–2 (60)	Tommy Gavigan	TKO	5 (6)	Mar 20, 1917	Palisades Rink, McKeesport, Pennsylvania, U.S.	
75	Win	13–2 (60)	Frankie Brennan	NWS	6	Mar 5, 1917	Power Auditorium, Pittsburgh, Pennsylvania, U.S.	
74	Win	13–2 (59)	Willie KO Brennan	NWS	10	Feb 12, 1917	Broadway Auditorium, Buffalo, New York, U.S.	
73	Loss	13–2 (58)	Mike Gibbons	NWS	6	Feb 10, 1917	National A.C., Pittsburgh, Pennsylvania, U.S.	
72	Win	13–2 (57)	Fay Keiser	PTS	20	Jan 29, 1917	Lonaconing, Maryland, U.S.	
71	Win	12–2 (57)	Jules Ritchie	TKO	4 (6)	Jan 20, 1917	National A.C., Philadelphia, Pennsylvania, U.S.	
70	Win	11–2 (57)	Eddie Coleman	KO	2 (10)	Jan 13, 1917	Skating Rink, Charleroi, Pennsylvania, U.S.	
69	Win	10–2 (57)	Joe Borrell	NWS	6	Jan 1, 1917	Power Auditorium, Pittsburgh, Pennsylvania, U.S.	
68	Win	10–2 (56)	Bob Moha	NWS	10	Dec 26, 1916	Broadway Auditorium, Buffalo, New York, U.S.	
67	Win	10–2 (55)	George K.O. Brown	NWS	6	Nov 27, 1916	Power Auditorium, Pittsburgh, Pennsylvania, U.S.	
66	Win	10–2 (54)	Tommy Burke	NWS	10	Nov 24, 1916	Broadway Auditorium, Buffalo, New York, U.S.	
65	Win	10–2 (53)	Willie KO Brennan	NWS	10	Nov 17, 1916	Broadway Auditorium, Buffalo, New York, U.S.	
64	Win	10–2 (52)	Jackie Clark	KO	3 (10)	Nov 14, 1916	Lonaconing, Maryland, U.S.	
63	Win	9–2 (52)	Willie KO Brennan	NWS	10	Nov 8, 1916	Carney Auditorium, Erie, Pennsylvania, U.S.	
62	Win	9–2 (51)	KO Sweeney	NWS	6	Nov 4, 1916	Power Auditorium, Pittsburgh, Pennsylvania, U.S.	
61	Win	9–2 (50)	Harry Baker	NWS	6	Oct 21, 1916	Power Auditorium, Pittsburgh, Pennsylvania, U.S.	
60	Win	9–2 (49)	Jackie Clark	PTS	10	Oct 16, 1916	Lonaconing, Maryland, U.S.	
59	Win	8–2 (49)	Fay Keiser	PTS	10	Sep 4, 1916	Cumberland, Maryland, U.S.	
58	Win	7–2 (49)	Jerry Cole	NWS	6	Aug 28, 1916	Power Auditorium, Pittsburgh, Pennsylvania, U.S.	
57	Win	7–2 (48)	Al Grayber	NWS	6	Aug 7, 1916	Power Auditorium, Pittsburgh, Pennsylvania, U.S.	
56	Loss	7–2 (47)	George Chip	NWS	10	Jun 26, 1916	Coliseum, New Castle, Pennsylvania, U.S.	
55	Win	7–2 (46)	Whitey Wenzel	NWS	10	Jun 17, 1916	New Kensington A.C., New Kensington, U.S.	
54	Win	7–2 (45)	Kid Manuel	KO	1 (6)	Jun 3, 1916	Power Auditorium, Pittsburgh, Pennsylvania, U.S.	
53	Win	6–2 (45)	Whitey Wenzel	NWS	6	May 6, 1916	Skating Rink, Charleroi, Pennsylvania, U.S.	
52	NC	6–2 (44)	Grant Clark	NC	6 (10)	Apr 27, 1916	Casino, Johnstown, Pennsylvania, U.S.	The referee stopped the fight and ruled a double disqualification because both men were fouling
51	Win	6–2 (43)	Kid Manuel	NWS	6	Apr 1, 1916	Power Auditorium, Pittsburgh, Pennsylvania, U.S.	
50	Draw	6–2 (42)	Walter Monaghan	NWS	6	Feb 26, 1916	Power Auditorium, Pittsburgh, Pennsylvania, U.S.	
49	Loss	6–2 (41)	Kid Graves	TKO	2 (6)	Dec 16, 1915	Power Auditorium, Pittsburgh, Pennsylvania, U.S.	Greb was forced to retire after, completely fracturing the radius of his left arm.
48	Loss	6–1 (41)	Tommy Gibbons	NWS	10	Nov 16, 1915	Auditorium, Saint Paul, Minnesota, U.S.	
47	Draw	6–1 (40)	George Chip	NWS	6	Oct 18, 1915	Duquesne Garden, Pittsburgh, Pennsylvania, U.S.	
46	Win	6–1 (39)	Al Rogers	NWS	6	Sep 13, 1915	Duquesne Garden, Pittsburgh, Pennsylvania, U.S.	
45	Win	6–1 (38)	Al Rogers	NWS	6	Aug 23, 1915	Duquesne Garden, Pittsburgh, Pennsylvania, U.S.	
44	Win	6–1 (37)	Fay Keiser	NWS	10	Jul 22, 1915	Moose Hall, Cumberland, Maryland, U.S.	
43	Win	6–1 (36)	George Hauser	KO	6 (6)	Jul 21, 1915	Knoxville Elks Club Picnic Grounds, Elwyn Grove, Pennsylvania, U.S.	
42	Win	5–1 (36)	Tommy Gavigan	NWS	6	Jul 12, 1915	Duquesne Garden, Pittsburgh, Pennsylvania, U.S.	
41	Draw	5–1 (35)	Fay Keiser	NWS	10	Jun 25, 1915	Cumberland, Maryland, U.S.	
40	Loss	5–1 (34)	Fay Keiser	NWS	6	May 31, 1915	West Side Basketball Hall, Connellsville, Pennsylvania, U.S.	
39	Win	5–1 (33)	Whitey Wenzel	NWS	6	May 24, 1915	Duquesne Garden, Pittsburgh, Pennsylvania, U.S.	
38	Draw	5–1 (32)	Joe Borrell	NWS	6	Apr 22, 1915	Duquesne Garden, Pittsburgh, Pennsylvania, U.S.	
37	Draw	5–1 (31)	Whitey Wenzel	NWS	6	Apr 15, 1915	East Liberty Hall, Pittsburgh, Pennsylvania, U.S.	
36	Win	5–1 (30)	Harry Baker	NWS	6	Mar 25, 1915	Duquesne Garden, Pittsburgh, Pennsylvania, U.S.	
35	Win	5–1 (29)	Jack Lavin	NWS	6	Mar 13, 1915	Palisades Rink, McKeesport, Pennsylvania, U.S.	
34	Win	5–1 (28)	Tommy Mack	NWS	6	Mar 6, 1915	West Bean street rink, Washington, Pennsylvania, U.S.	
33	Win	5–1 (27)	Whitey Wenzel	NWS	6	Mar 4, 1915	East Liberty Hall, Philadelphia, Pennsylvania, U.S.	
32	Win	5–1 (26)	Harry Baker	NWS	6	Feb 10, 1915	Duquesne Garden, Philadelphia, Pennsylvania, U.S.	
31	Win	5–1 (25)	Jack Blackburn	NWS	6	Jan 25, 1915	Duquesne Garden, Philadelphia, Pennsylvania, U.S.	
30	Draw	5–1 (24)	Billy Miske	NWS	6	Jan 12, 1915	Fairmont A.C., Philadelphia, Pennsylvania, U.S.	
29	Win	5–1 (23)	Howard Truesdale	NWS	6	Jan 8, 1915	Nonpareil A.C., Philadelphia, Pennsylvania, U.S.	
28	Win	5–1 (22)	Billy Donovan	NWS	6	Jan 1, 1915	Nonpareil A.C., Philadelphia, Pennsylvania, U.S.	
27	Loss	5–1 (21)	Joe Borrell	NWS	6	Dec 7, 1914	Olympia A.C., Philadelphia, Pennsylvania, U.S.	
26	Draw	5–1 (20)	Terry Martin	NWS	6	Nov 14, 1914	National A.C., Philadelphia, Pennsylvania, U.S.	
25	Win	5–1 (19)	Jack Fink	NWS	6	Sep 26, 1914	National A.C., Philadelphia, Pennsylvania, U.S.	
24	Win	5–1 (18)	John Foley	NWS	6	Aug 31, 1914	Waldemeier Hall, Pittsburgh, Pennsylvania, U.S.	
23	Draw	5–1 (17)	Whitey Wenzel	NWS	6	Aug 24, 1914	Waldemeier Hall, Pittsburgh, Pennsylvania, U.S.	
22	Win	5–1 (16)	Irish Gorgas	NWS	6	Aug 10, 1914	Waldemeier Hall, Pittsburgh, Pennsylvania, U.S.	
21	Win	5–1 (15)	George Lewis	NWS	10	Jul 27, 1914	Steubenville, Ohio, U.S.	
20	Win	5–1 (14)	John Foley	NWS	6	Jul 20, 1914	Waldemeier Hall, Pittsburgh, U.S.	
19	Win	5–1 (13)	Irish Gorgas	NWS	6	Jun 29, 1914	Waldemeier Hall, Pittsburgh, U.S.	
18	Win	5–1 (12)	Walter Monaghan	NWS	6	Jun 15, 1914	Waldemeier Hall, Pittsburgh, U.S.	
17	Draw	5–1 (11)	Whitey Wenzel	NWS	6	May 29, 1914	Academy Theater, Pittsburgh, U.S.	
16	Win	5–1 (10)	George Lewis	NWS	6	May 25, 1914	Southside Market House, Pittsburgh, Pennsylvania, U.S.	
15	Draw	5–1 (9)	Fay Keiser	NWS	6	May 13, 1914	Southside Market House, Pittsburgh, Pennsylvania, U.S.	
14	Win	5–1 (8)	Fay Keiser	NWS	6	Apr 14, 1914	Duquesne Garden, Pittsburgh, Pennsylvania, U.S.	
13	Win	5–1 (7)	Mickey Rodgers	DQ	5 (8)	Mar 2, 1914	Steubenville, Ohio, U.S.	
12	Win	4–1 (7)	Whitey Wenzel	NWS	6	Jan 10, 1914	Old City Hall, Pittsburgh, Pennsylvania, U.S.	
11	Win	4–1 (6)	Whitey Wenzel	NWS	6	Jan 1, 1914	Old City Hall, Pittsburgh, Pennsylvania, U.S.	
10	Win	4–1 (5)	Young Battling Nelson	TKO	3 (6)	Dec 12, 1913	Mishler Theatre, Altoona, Pennsylvania, U.S.	
9	Win	3–1 (5)	Battling Sherbine	NWS	6	Dec 6, 1913	Old City Hall, Pittsburgh, Pennsylvania, U.S.	
8	Loss	3–1 (4)	Joe Chip	KO	2 (6)	Nov 29, 1913	Old City Hall, Pittsburgh, Pennsylvania, U.S.	
7	Win	3–0 (4)	Mike Milko	NWS	6	Nov 17, 1913	Southside Market House, Pittsburgh, Pennsylvania, U.S.	
6	Draw	3–0 (3)	Mike Milko	NWS	6	Oct 22, 1913	Tariff Club, Pittsburgh, Pennsylvania, U.S.	
5	Loss	3–0 (2)	Harvey "Hooks" Evans	NWS	6	Oct 11, 1913	Old City Hall, Pittsburgh, Pennsylvania, U.S.	
4	Win	3–0 (1)	Lloyd Crutcher	KO	1 (6)	Aug 13, 1913	Punxsutawney, Pennsylvania, U.S.	
3	Win	2–0 (1)	Battling Murphy	TKO	2 (6)	Jul 19, 1913	Old City Hall, Pittsburgh, Pennsylvania, U.S.	
2	Win	1–0 (1)	Frank Kirkwood	NWS	6	May 29, 1913	Exposition Hall, Pittsburgh, Pennsylvania, U.S.	
1	Win	1–0	Red Cumpston	KO	2 (?)	May 8, 1913	East Liberty Hall, Pittsburgh, Pennsylvania, U.S.	

=== Unofficial record ===
299 fights	261 wins	18 losses
By knockout	49	2
By decision	210	15
By disqualification	2	1
Draws	19	
No contests	1	

Record with the inclusion of newspaper decisions in the win/loss/draw column.

No.	Result	Record	Opponent	Type	Round	Date	Location	Notes
299	Loss	261–18–19 (1)	Tiger Flowers	SD	15	Aug 19, 1926	Madison Square Garden, New York City, New York, U.S.	For NYSAC, NBA, and The Ring middleweight titles
298	Win	261–17–19 (1)	Allentown Joe Gans	UD	10	Jun 15, 1926	Artillery Park, Wilkes-Barre, Pennsylvania, U.S.	
297	Win	260–17–19 (1)	Art Weigand	PTS	10	Jun 1, 1926	Broadway Auditorium, Buffalo, New York, U.S.	
296	Loss	259–17–19 (1)	Tiger Flowers	SD	15	Feb 26, 1926	Madison Square Garden, New York City, New York, U.S.	Lost NYSAC, NBA, and The Ring middleweight titles
295	Win	259–16–19 (1)	Owen Phelps	PTS	10	Feb 12, 1926	Capital City Arena, Phoenix, Arizona, U.S.	
294	Win	258–16–19 (1)	Jimmy Delaney	PTS	10	Feb 3, 1926	Oakland Auditorium, Oakland, California, U.S.	
293	Win	257–16–19 (1)	Buck Holley	TKO	5 (10)	Jan 29, 1926	Legion Stadium, Hollywood, California	
292	Win	256–16–19 (1)	Ted Moore	PTS	10	Jan 26, 1926	Los Angeles Arena, Vernon, California, U.S.	
291	Win	255–16–19 (1)	Joe Lohman	PTS	10	Jan 19, 1926	Omaha Auditorium, Omaha, Nebraska, U.S.	
290	Win	254–16–19 (1)	Roland Todd	PTS	12	Jan 11, 1926	Coliseum, Toronto, Ontario, Canada	
289	Win	253–16–19 (1)	Soldier Buck	PTS	8	Dec 14, 1925	Nashville, Tennessee, U.S.	
288	Win	252–16–19 (1)	Tony Marullo	PTS	15	Nov 13, 1925	Coliseum Arena, New Orleans, Louisiana, U.S.	
287	Win	251–16–19 (1)	Tony Marullo	PTS	10	Oct 13, 1925	Motor Square Garden, Pittsburgh, Pennsylvania, U.S.	
286	Win	250–16–19 (1)	Tom Burns	NWS	10	Aug 17, 1925	Fairgrounds Coliseum, Detroit, Michigan, U.S.	
285	Win	249–16–19 (1)	Pat Walsh	TKO	2 (10)	Aug 12, 1925	Atlantic City Airport, Atlantic City, New Jersey, U.S.	
284	Win	248–16–19 (1)	Ed Smith	KO	4 (10)	Aug 4, 1925	Memorial Hall, Kansas City, Kansas, U.S.	
283	Win	247–16–19 (1)	Otis Bryant	TKO	3 (10)	Jul 31, 1925	Floto Outdoor Arena, Tulsa, Oklahoma, U.S.	
282	Win	246–16–19 (1)	Ralph Brooks	NWS	10	Jul 27, 1925	Forum, Wichita, Kansas, U.S.	
281	Win	245–16–19 (1)	Billy Britton	PTS	10	Jul 22, 1925	Anti Horse Thief Association Stock Show, Columbus, Kansas, U.S.	
280	Win	244–16–19 (1)	Maxie Rosenbloom	NWS	10	Jul 16, 1925	Taylor Bowl, Cleveland, Ohio, U.S.	
279	Win	243–16–19 (1)	Mickey Walker	UD	15	Jul 2, 1925	Polo Grounds, New York City, New York, U.S.	Retained NYSAC, NBA, and The Ring middleweight titles
278	Win	242–16–19 (1)	Jimmy Nuss	KO	4 (10)	Jun 5, 1925	Palestra, Marquette, Michigan, U.S.	
277	Win	241–16–19 (1)	Soldier Buck	NWS	10	Jun 1, 1925	Jefferson County Armory, Louisville, Kentucky, U.S.	
276	Win	240–16–19 (1)	Tom Burns	NWS	10	May 29, 1925	Tomlinson Hall, Indianapolis, Indiana, U.S.	
275	Win	239–16–19 (1)	Billy Britton	PTS	12	May 6, 1925	Fairmont Arena, Columbus, Ohio, U.S.	
274	Win	238–16–19 (1)	Quintin Romero Rojas	PTS	10	May 1, 1925	Arena Gardens, Detroit, Michigan, U.S.	
273	Win	237–16–19 (1)	Jack Reddick	PTS	10	Apr 24, 1925	Arena Gardens, Toronto, Ontario, Canada	
272	Win	236–16–19 (1)	Johnny Wilson	PTS	10	Apr 17, 1925	Commercial A.C., Boston, Massachusetts, U.S.	
271	Loss	235–16–19 (1)	Gene Tunney	NWS	10	Mar 27, 1925	Saint Paul Auditorium, Saint Paul, Minnesota	
270	Win	235–15–19 (1)	Young Fisher	DQ	6 (10)	Feb 23, 1925	Town Hall, Scranton, Pennsylvania, U.S.	
269	Win	234–15–19 (1)	Billy Britton	PTS	10	Feb 17, 1925	Allentown, Pennsylvania, U.S.	
268	Win	233–15–19 (1)	Jimmy Delaney	NWS	10	Jan 30, 1925	Auditorium, Saint Paul, Minnesota, U.S.	
267	Win	232–15–19 (1)	Johnny Papke	TKO	7 (12)	Jan 19, 1925	Weller Theater, Zanesville, Ohio, U.S.	
266	Win	231–15–19 (1)	Bob Sage	NWS	10	Jan 9, 1925	Arena Gardens, Detroit, Michigan, U.S.	
265	Win	230–15–19 (1)	Augie Ratner	PTS	10	Jan 1, 1925	Motor Square Garden, Pittsburgh, Pennsylvania, U.S.	
264	Win	229–15–19 (1)	Frankie Ritz	TKO	3 (10)	Nov 25, 1924	Wheeling, West Virginia, U.S.	
263	Win	228–15–19 (1)	Jimmy Delaney	PTS	10	Nov 17, 1924	Motor Square Garden, Pittsburgh, Pennsylvania, U.S.	
262	Win	227–15–19 (1)	Ray Nelson	KO	3 (6)	Nov 11, 1924	Midway Auditorium, Philipsburg, Pennsylvania, U.S	
261	Draw	226–15–19 (1)	Tommy Loughran	SD	10	Oct 13, 1924	Philadelphia Arena, Philadelphia, Pennsylvania, U.S.	
260	Draw	226–15–18 (1)	Gene Tunney	NWS	10	Sep 17, 1924	Olympic Arena, Cleveland, Ohio, U.S.	
259	Win	226–15–17 (1)	Billy Hirsch	TKO	8 (10)	Sep 15, 1924	Wabash Park, Mingo Junction, Ohio, U.S.	
258	Win	225–15–17 (1)	Jimmy Slattery	PTS	6	Sep 3, 1924	Bison Stadium, Buffalo, New York, U.S.	
257	Win	224–15–17 (1)	Tiger Flowers	NWS	10	Aug 21, 1924	Legion Stadium, Fremont, Ohio, U.S.	
256	Win	223–15–17 (1)	Ted Moore	UD	15	Jun 26, 1924	Yankee Stadium, Bronx, New York City, New York, U.S.	Retained NYSAC, NBA, and The Ring middleweight titles
255	Win	222–15–17 (1)	Frank Moody	KO	6 (12)	Jun 16, 1924	Brassco Park, Waterbury, Connecticut, U.S.	
254	Win	221–15–17 (1)	Martin Burke	NWS	10	Jun 12, 1924	Olympic Arena, Brooklyn, New York City, New York, U.S.	
253	Win	220–15–17 (1)	Pal Reed	PTS	10	May 12, 1924	Motor Square Garden, Pittsburgh, Pennsylvania, U.S.	
252	Win	219–15–17 (1)	Jackie Clark	TKO	2 (12)	May 5, 1924	Ben Franklin Arena, Kenilworth, Maryland, U.S.	
251	Loss	218–15–17 (1)	Kid Norfolk	DQ	6 (10)	Apr 19, 1924	Commercial A.C., Boston, Massachusetts, U.S.	
250	Win	218–14–17 (1)	Fay Keiser	TKO	12 (15)	Mar 24, 1924	104th Regiment Armory, Baltimore, Maryland, U.S.	
249	Win	217–14–17 (1)	Jack Reeves	PTS	4	Feb 22, 1924	Oakland Auditorium, Oakland, California, U.S.	
248	Win	216–14–17 (1)	Johnny Wilson	UD	15	Jan 18, 1924	Madison Square Garden, New York City, New York, U.S.	Retained NYSAC, NBA, and The Ring middleweight titles
247	Win	215–14–17 (1)	Tommy Loughran	PTS	10	Dec 25, 1923	Motor Square Garden, Pittsburgh, Pennsylvania, U.S.	
246	Loss	214–14–17 (1)	Gene Tunney	UD	15	Dec 10, 1923	Madison Square Garden, New York City, New York, U.S.	For ABA light-heavyweight title
245	Win	214–13–17 (1)	Bryan Downey	UD	10	Dec 3, 1923	Motor Square Garden, Pittsburgh, Pennsylvania, U.S.	Retained NYSAC and NBA middleweight titles
244	Win	213–13–17 (1)	Chuck Wiggins	NWS	10	Nov 15, 1923	Armory, Grand Rapids, Michigan, U.S.	
243	Win	212–13–17 (1)	Soldier Jones	NWS	10	Nov 5, 1923	Motor Square Garden, Pittsburgh, Pennsylvania, U.S.	
242	Win	211–13–17 (1)	Lou Bogash	NWS	12	Oct 22, 1923	1st Regiment Armory, Newark, New Jersey, U.S.	
241	Loss	210–13–17 (1)	Tommy Loughran	PTS	10	Oct 11, 1923	Commercial A.C., Boston, Massachusetts, U.S.	
240	Win	210–12–17 (1)	Jimmy Darcy	NWS	10	Oct 4, 1923	Forbes Field, Pittsburgh, Pennsylvania, U.S.	
239	Win	209–12–17 (1)	Johnny Wilson	UD	15	Aug 31, 1923	Polo Grounds, New York City, New York, U.S.	Won NYSAC and NBA middleweight titles
238	Win	208–12–17 (1)	Len Rowlands	KO	3 (10)	Jun 16, 1923	Craft's Five Acres, Uniontown, Pennsylvania, U.S.	
237	Loss	207–12–17 (1)	Gene Tunney	SD	15	Feb 23, 1923	Madison Square Garden, New York City, New York, U.S.	Lost ABA light-heavyweight title
236	Win	207–11–17 (1)	Young Fisher	PTS	12	Feb 16, 1923	Syracuse Arena, New York City, New York, U.S.	
235	Win	206–11–17 (1)	Pal Reed	NWS	12	Feb 5, 1923	Broad A.C., Newark, New Jersey, U.S.	
234	Win	205–11–17 (1)	Tommy Loughran	UD	15	Jan 30, 1923	Madison Square Garden, New York City, New York, U.S.	Retained ABA light-heavyweight title
233	Win	204–11–17 (1)	Billy Shade	NWS	12	Jan 22, 1923	4th Regiment Armory, Jersey City, New Jersey, U.S.	
232	Win	203–11–17 (1)	Tommy Loughran	NWS	10	Jan 15, 1923	Motor Square Garden, Pittsburgh, Pennsylvania, U.S.	
231	Win	202–11–17 (1)	Bob Roper	NWS	10	Jan 1, 1923	Motor Square Garden, Pittsburgh, Pennsylvania, U.S.	
230	Win	201–11–17 (1)	Bob Roper	PTS	12	Nov 10, 1922	Broadway Auditorium, Buffalo, New York, U.S.	
229	Win	200–11–17 (1)	Larry Williams	TKO	4 (12)	Oct 27, 1922	Marieville Gardens, North Providence, Rhode Island, U.S>	
228	Win	199–11–17 (1)	Bob Roper	NWS	10	Sep 29, 1922	Armory, Grand Rapids, Michigan, U.S.	
227	Win	198–11–17 (1)	Al Benedict	TKO	2 (10)	Sep 26, 1922	Coliseum, Toronto, Ontario, Canada	
226	Win	197–11–17 (1)	Tommy Loughran	NWS	8	Jul 10, 1922	Shibe Park, Philadelphia, Pennsylvania, U.S.	
225	Win	196–11–17 (1)	Hugh Walker	NWS	10	Jun 26, 1922	Forbes Field, Pittsburgh, Pennsylvania, U.S.	
224	Win	195–11–17 (1)	Gene Tunney	UD	15	May 23, 1922	Madison Square Garden, New York City, New York, U.S.	Won ABA light-heavyweight title
223	Win	194–11–17 (1)	Al Roberts	KO	6 (10)	May 12, 1922	Boston Arena, Boston, Massachusetts, U.S.	
222	Win	193–11–17 (1)	Tommy Gibbons	UD	15	Mar 13, 1922	Madison Square Garden, New York City, New York, U.S.	
221	Win	192–11–17 (1)	Jeff Smith	NWS	10	Feb 20, 1922	Freeman Avenue Armory, Cincinnati, Ohio, U.S.	
220	Win	191–11–17 (1)	Hugh Walker	NWS	10	Feb 1, 1922	Armory, Grand Rapids, Michigan, U.S.	
219	Win	190–11–17 (1)	Chuck Wiggins	NWS	10	Jan 2, 1922	Heuck's Opera House, Cincinnati, Ohio, U.S.	
218	Win	189–11–17 (1)	Whitey Allen	TKO	6 (10)	Dec 23, 1921	Syracuse Arena, Syracuse, New York, U.S.	
217	Win	188–11–17 (1)	Fay Keiser	NWS	8	Dec 6, 1921	Ice Palace, Philadelphia, Pennsylvania, U.S.	
216	Win	187–11–17 (1)	Homer Smith	TKO	5 (12)	Nov 25, 1921	Newark Athletic Club, Newark, New Jersey, U.S.	
215	Win	186–11–17 (1)	Billy Shade	NWS	10	Nov 11, 1921	Motor Square Garden, Pittsburgh, Pennsylvania, U.S.	
214	Win	185–11–17 (1)	Charley Weinert	PTS	15	Nov 4, 1921	Madison Square Garden, New York City, New York, U.S.	
213	Win	184–11–17 (1)	Jimmy Darcy	UD	10	Oct 24, 1921	Broadway Auditorium, Buffalo, New York, U.S.	
212	Win	183–11–17 (1)	Joe Cox	PTS	12	Sep 20, 1921	Palace of Joy, Brooklyn, New York City, New York, U.S.	
211	Win	182–11–17 (1)	Chuck Wiggins	NWS	10	Sep 5, 1921	Huntington, West Virginia, U.S.	
210	Win	181–11–17 (1)	Kid Norfolk	NWS	10	Aug 29, 1921	Forbes Field, Philadelphia, Pennsylvania, U.S.	
209	Draw	180–11–17 (1)	Chuck Wiggins	NWS	10	Jun 23, 1921	Three-I League Park, Terre Haute, Indiana, U.S.	
208	Draw	180–11–16 (1)	Chuck Wiggins	NWS	10	May 28, 1921	Springbrook Park, South Bend, Indiana, U.S.	
207	Draw	180–11–15 (1)	Jeff Smith	PTS	15	May 20, 1921	Louisiana Auditorium, New Orleans, Louisiana, U.S.	
206	Win	180–11–14 (1)	Jimmy Darcy	PTS	10	May 13, 1921	Boston Arena, Boston, Massachusetts, U.S.	
205	Win	179–11–14 (1)	Bartley Madden	NWS	10	May 4, 1921	Motor Square Garden, Pittsburgh, Pennsylvania, U.S.	
204	Win	178–11–14 (1)	Soldier Jones	KO	4 (10)	Apr 11, 1921	The Armouries, Toronto, Ontario, Canada	
203	Win	177–11–14 (1)	Jack Renault	NWS	10	Apr 6, 1921	Mount Royal Arena, Montreal, Canada	
202	Win	176–11–14 (1)	Happy Littleton	PTS	15	Apr 1, 1921	Louisiana Auditorium, New Orleans, Louisiana, U.S.	
201	Win	175–11–14 (1)	Jack Renault	PTS	10	Mar 16, 1921	Exposition Hall, Pittsburgh, Pennsylvania, U.S.	
200	Win	174–11–14 (1)	Jeff Smith	PTS	10	Feb 25, 1921	Commercial A.C., Boston, Massachusetts, U.S.	
199	Win	173–11–14 (1)	Pal Reed	PTS	10	Jan 29, 1921	Commercial A.C., Boston, Massachusetts, U.S.	
198	Win	172–11–14 (1)	Johnny Celmars	NWS	10	Jan 20, 1921	Dallas, Texas, U.S.	
197	Win	171–11–14 (1)	Jeff Smith	NWS	10	Dec 25, 1920	Motor Square Garden, Pittsburgh, Pennsylvania, U.S.	
196	Win	170–11–14 (1)	Bob Roper	PTS	10	Dec 21, 1920	Commercial A.C., Boston, Massachusetts, U.S.	
195	Win	169–11–14 (1)	Jack Duffy	TKO	6 (10)	Dec 11, 1920	Motor Square Garden, Pittsburgh, Pennsylvania, U.S.	
194	Win	168–11–14 (1)	Bob Moha	NWS	10	Nov 22, 1920	Auditorium, Milwaukee, Wisconsin, U.S.	
193	Win	167–11–14 (1)	Bartley Madden	NWS	10	Nov 10, 1920	National Guard Armory, Kalamazoo, Michigan, U.S.	
192	Win	166–11–14 (1)	Mickey Shannon	NWS	10	Oct 28, 1920	Exposition Hall, Pittsburgh, Pennsylvania, U.S.	
191	Win	165–11–14 (1)	Gunboat Smith	KO	1 (10)	Oct 21, 1920	Springbrook Park, South Bend, Indiana, U.S.	
190	Win	164–11–14 (1)	Ted Jamieson	TKO	6 (10)	Sep 22, 1920	Milwaukee Auditorium, Milwaukee, Wisconsin, U.S.	
189	Win	163–11–14 (1)	Chuck Wiggins	NWS	6	Sep 6, 1920	Floyd Fitzsimmons Arena, Benton Harbor, Michigan, U.S.	
188	Win	162–11–14 (1)	Ted Jamieson	NWS	10	Aug 28, 1920	Ramona Baseball Park, Grand Rapids, Michigan, U.S.	
187	Win	161–11–14 (1)	Chuck Wiggins	NWS	10	Aug 20, 1920	National Guard Armory, Kalamazoo, Michigan, U.S.	
186	Win	160–11–14 (1)	Bob Moha	NWS	10	Aug 14, 1920	Cedar Point Arena, Sandusky, Ohio, U.S.	
185	Win	159–11–14 (1)	Tommy Gibbons	NWS	10	Jul 31, 1920	Forbes Field, Pittsburgh, Pennsylvania, U.S.	
184	Win	158–11–14 (1)	Larry Williams	NWS	10	Jul 8, 1920	Bison Stadium, Buffalo, New York, U.S.	
183	Win	157–11–14 (1)	Bob Moha	NWS	12	Jul 5, 1920	Canton Auditorium, Canton, Ohio, U.S.	
182	Win	156–11–14 (1)	Frank Carbone	NWS	10	Jun 28, 1920	Convention Hall, Rochester, New York, U.S.	
181	Win	155–11–14 (1)	Clay Turner	NWS	8	Jun 2, 1920	Ice Palace, Philadelphia, Pennsylvania, U.S.	
180	Loss	154–11–14 (1)	Tommy Gibbons	NWS	10	May 15, 1920	Forbes Field, Pittsburgh, Pennsylvania, U.S.	
179	Win	154–10–14 (1)	Bob Roper	PTS	12	Apr 5, 1920	Stockyards Stadium, Denver, Colorado, U.S.	
178	Win	153–10–14 (1)	George K.O. Brown	PTS	12	Mar 25, 1920	Stockyards Stadium, Denver, Colorado, U.S.	
177	Win	152–10–14 (1)	Larry Williams	NWS	10	Mar 22, 1920	Exposition Hall, Pittsburgh, Pennsylvania, U.S.	
176	Win	151–10–14 (1)	Tommy Robson	PTS	12	Mar 17, 1920	Industries Building, Dayton, Ohio, U.S.	
175	Win	150–10–14 (1)	Clay Turner	NWS	12	Mar 9, 1920	Armory, Akron, Ohio, U.S.	
174	Win	149–10–14 (1)	Bob Roper	NWS	10	Feb 21, 1920	Exposition Hall, Pittsburgh, Pennsylvania, U.S.	
173	Win	148–10–14 (1)	Zulu Kid	NWS	10	Feb 6, 1920	National Guard Armory, Kalamazoo, Michigan, U.S.	
172	Win	147–10–14 (1)	Clay Turner	NWS	6	Dec 22, 1919	Olympia A.C., Philadelphia, Pennsylvania, U.S.	
171	Win	146–10–14 (1)	Billy Kramer	NWS	10	Dec 15, 1919	Southside Market House, Pittsburgh, Pennsylvania, U.S.	
170	Win	145–10–14 (1)	Mike McTigue	NWS	10	Dec 12, 1919	Ideal Park Pavilion, Endicott, New York, U.S.	
169	Win	144–10–14 (1)	Clay Turner	NWS	10	Dec 10, 1919	Broadway Auditorium, Buffalo, New York, U.S.	
168	Win	143–10–14 (1)	Soldier Jones	KO	5 (10)	Nov 28, 1919	Broadway Auditorium, Buffalo, New York, U.S.	
167	Win	142–10–14 (1)	Zulu Kid	NWS	10	Nov 27, 1919	Nonpareil A.C., Beaver Falls, Pennsylvania, U.S.	
166	Win	141–10–14 (1)	Larry Williams	NWS	10	Nov 24, 1919	Southside Market House, Pittsburgh, Pennsylvania, U.S.	
165	Win	140–10–14 (1)	George K.O. Brown	NWS	12	Nov 17, 1919	Canton Auditorium, Canton, Ohio, U.S.	
164	Win	139–10–14 (1)	Sailor Ed Petroskey	NWS	6	Oct 13, 1919	Olympia A.C., Philadelphia, Pennsylvania, U.S.	
163	Win	138–10–14 (1)	Silent Martin	NWS	8	Sep 18, 1919	Coliseum, Saint Louis, Missouri, U.S.	
162	Win	137–10–14 (1)	Battling Levinsky	NWS	10	Sep 3, 1919	Wheeling, West Virginia, U.S.	ABA and world light-heavyweight titles at stake; (via KO only)
161	Win	136–10–14 (1)	Jeff Smith	NWS	12	Sep 1, 1919	Idora Park, Youngstown, Ohio, U.S.	
160	Win	135–10–14 (1)	Bill Brennan	NWS	10	Aug 23, 1919	Forbes Field, Pittsburgh, Pennsylvania, U.S.	
159	Win	134–10–14 (1)	Terry Kellar	PTS	15	Aug 11, 1919	Highland Park, Dayton, Ohio, U.S.	
158	Win	133–10–14 (1)	Joe Chip	NWS	12	Jul 24, 1919	Idora Park, Youngstown, Ohio, U.S.	
157	Win	132–10–14 (1)	George K.O. Brown	NWS	10	Jul 16, 1919	Wheeling Park, Wheeling, West Virginia, U.S.	
156	Win	131–10–14 (1)	Battling Levinsky	NWS	6	Jul 14, 1919	Shibe Park, Philadelphia, Pennsylvania	
155	Win	130–10–14 (1)	Bill Brennan	PTS	15	Jul 4, 1919	Convention Hall, Tulsa, Oklahoma, U.S.	
154	Win	129–10–14 (1)	Mike Gibbons	NWS	10	Jun 23, 1919	Forbes Field, Philadelphia, Pennsylvania, U.S.	
153	Win	128–10–14 (1)	Yankee Gilbert	TKO	4 (10)	Jun 20, 1919	Wheeling, West Virginia, U.S.	
152	Win	127–10–14 (1)	Happy Howard	NWS	10	Jun 18, 1919	Carney Auditorium, Erie, Pennsylvania, U.S.	
151	Win	126–10–14 (1)	Joe Borrell	TKO	5 (6)	Jun 16, 1919	Shibe Park, Philadelphia, Pennsylvania, U.S.	
150	Win	125–10–14 (1)	Tommy Robson	NWS	10	May 26, 1919	Arena, Syracuse, New York, U.S.	
149	Win	124–10–14 (1)	Bartley Madden	NWS	10	May 13, 1919	Broadway Auditorium, Buffalo, New York, U.S.	
148	Win	123–10–14 (1)	Willie Meehan	NWS	10	May 8, 1919	Duquesne Garden, Pittsburgh, Pennsylvania, U.S.	
147	Win	122–10–14 (1)	Clay Turner	PTS	12	May 6, 1919	Boston, Massachusetts, U.S.	
146	Win	121–10–14 (1)	Battling Levinsky	NWS	12	Apr 28, 1919	Canton Auditorium, Canton, Ohio, U.S.	
145	Win	120–10–14 (1)	Leo Houck	NWS	10	Apr 25, 1919	Carney Auditorium, Erie, Pennsylvania, U.S.	
144	Win	119–10–14 (1)	George Davis	NWS	10	Apr 8, 1919	Broadway Auditorium, Buffalo, New York, U.S.	
143	Win	118–10–14 (1)	Young Fisher	NWS	10	Apr 7, 1919	Arena, Syracuse, New York, U.S.	
142	Win	117–10–14 (1)	Tommy Madden	KO	2 (10)	Apr 2, 1919	Majestic Theater, Butler, Pennsylvania, U.S.	
141	Win	116–10–14 (1)	Billy Miske	NWS	10	Mar 31, 1919	Duquesne Garden, Erie, Pennsylvania, U.S.	
140	Win	115–10–14 (1)	Happy Howard	NWS	10	Mar 25, 1919	Cambria Theatre, Johnstown, Pennsylvania, U.S.	
139	Win	114–10–14 (1)	Bill Brennan	NWS	10	Mar 17, 1919	Duquesne Garden, Pittsburgh, Pennsylvania, U.S.	
138	Win	113–10–14 (1)	Leo Houck	NWS	6	Mar 6, 1919	Fulton Opera House, Lancaster, Pennsylvania, U.S.	
137	Win	112–10–14 (1)	Chuck Wiggins	NWS	8	Mar 3, 1919	Elks Auditorium, Detroit, Michigan, U.S.	
136	Win	111–10–14 (1)	Chuck Wiggins	NWS	12	Feb 28, 1919	Coliseum, Toledo, Ohio, U.S.	
135	Win	110–10–14 (1)	Battling Levinsky	NWS	10	Feb 17, 1919	Broadway Auditorium, Buffalo, New York, U.S.	ABA and NYSAC light-heavyweight titles at stake; (via KO only)
134	Win	109–10–14 (1)	Bill Brennan	NWS	10	Feb 10, 1919	Arena, Syracuse, New York, U.S.	
133	Win	108–10–14 (1)	Len Rowlands	TKO	4 (10)	Feb 3, 1919	Southside Market House, Pittsburgh, Pennsylvania, U.S.	
132	Win	107–10–14 (1)	Tommy Robson	NWS	10	Jan 31, 1919	Cleveland A.C., Cleveland, Ohio, U.S.	
131	Win	106–10–14 (1)	Jakob "Soldier" Bartfield	NWS	12	Jan 27, 1919	Memorial Hall, Columbus, Ohio, U.S.	
130	Win	105–10–14 (1)	Paul Samson-Körner	NWS	10	Jan 23, 1919	Southside Market House, Pittsburgh, Pennsylvania, U.S.	
129	Win	104–10–14 (1)	Young Fisher	NWS	10	Jan 20, 1919	Grand Opera House, Syracuse, New York, U.S.	
128	Win	103–10–14 (1)	Leo Houck	PTS	12	Jan 14, 1919	Boston Arena, Boston, Massachusetts, U.S.	
127	Loss	102–10–14 (1)	Billy Miske	NWS	10	Sep 21, 1918	Forbes Field, Pittsburgh, Pennsylvania	
126	Win	102–9–14 (1)	Clay Turner	NWS	8	Aug 9, 1918	Ballpark, Jersey City, New Jersey, U.S.	
125	Win	101–9–14 (1)	Battling Levinsky	NWS	6	Aug 6, 1918	Shibe Park, Philadelphia, Pennsylvania, U.S.	
124	Win	100–9–14 (1)	Eddie McGoorty	PTS	10	Jul 27, 1918	Fort Sheridan, Illinois, U.S.	
123	Draw	99–9–14 (1)	Jakob "Soldier" Bartfield	NWS	6	Jul 16, 1918	Shibe Park, Philadelphia, Pennsylvania, U.S.	
122	Win	99–9–13 (1)	Bob Moha	NWS	10	Jul 4, 1918	Douglas Park, Rock Island, Illinois, U.S.	
121	Win	98–9–13 (1)	Frank Carbone	NWS	15	Jun 24, 1918	Casino Hall, Bridgeport, Connecticut, U.S.	
120	Win	97–9–13 (1)	Zulu Kid	NWS	6	Jun 20, 1918	Madison Square Garden, New York City, New York, U.S.	
119	Win	96–9–13 (1)	Jakob "Soldier" Bartfield	NWS	15	May 29, 1918	Swayne Field, Toledo, Ohio, U.S.	
118	Win	95–9–13 (1)	Jakob "Soldier" Bartfield	NWS	10	May 20, 1918	Forbes Field, Pittsburgh, Pennsylvania, U.S.	
117	Win	94–9–13 (1)	Clay Turner	NWS	15	May 15, 1918	Casino Hall, Bridgeport, Connecticut, U.S.	
116	Win	93–9–13 (1)	Al McCoy	PTS	10	May 13, 1918	People's Theater, Cincinnati, Ohio, U.S.	
115	Win	92–9–13 (1)	Willie Langford	NWS	6	Mar 18, 1918	Broadway Auditorium, Buffalo, New York, U.S.	
114	Win	91–9–13 (1)	Mike McTigue	NWS	10	Mar 11, 1918	Moose Hall, Cleveland, Ohio, U.S.	
113	Win	90–9–13 (1)	Jack Dillon	NWS	12	Mar 4, 1918	Toledo Coliseum, Toledo, Ohio, U.S.	
112	Draw	89–9–13 (1)	Mike O'Dowd	NWS	10	Feb 25, 1918	Saint Paul Auditorium, Saint Paul, Minnesota, U.S.	NYSAC middleweight title at stake; (via KO only)
111	Win	89–9–12 (1)	Bob Moha	PTS	10	Feb 18, 1918	People's Theater, Cincinnati, Ohio, U.S.	
110	Win	88–9–12 (1)	Jack Hubbard	KO	3 (10)	Feb 4, 1918	Lonaconing, Maryland, U.S.	
109	Win	87–9–12 (1)	Zulu Kid	NWS	14 (15)	Jan 29, 1918	Casino Hall, Bridgeport, Connecticut, U.S.	Halted near end of round 14 because of local law, requiring performances to end by 10:30 p.m.
108	Win	86–9–12 (1)	Augie Ratner	PTS	20	Jan 21, 1918	Dauphine Theater, New Orleans, Louisiana, U.S.	
107	Win	85–9–12 (1)	Battling Kopin	KO	1 (10)	Jan 14, 1918	Skating Rink, Charleroi, Pennsylvania, U.S.	
106	Win	84–9–12 (1)	Terry Kellar	NWS	10	Jan 4, 1918	Orpheum Theater, McKeesport, Pennsylvania, U.S.	
105	Win	83–9–12 (1)	Whitey Wenzel	NWS	10	Dec 25, 1917	Turner Hall, Homestead, Pennsylvania, U.S.	
104	Win	82–9–12 (1)	Gus Christie	PTS	12	Dec 17, 1917	Heuck's Opera House, Cincinnati, Ohio, U.S.	
103	Win	81–9–12 (1)	Terry Martin	KO	3 (10)	Dec 8, 1917	Skating Rink, Charleroi, Pennsylvania, U.S.	
102	Win	80–9–12 (1)	George Ashe	NWS	10	Dec 5, 1917	Cambria Theatre, Johnstown, Pennsylvania, U.S.	
101	Win	79–9–12 (1)	Willie Meehan	NWS	6	Dec 3, 1917	Olympia A.C., Philadelphia, Pennsylvania, U.S.	
100	Win	78–9–12 (1)	George Chip	PTS	10	Nov 19, 1917	Heuck's Opera House, Cincinnati, Ohio, U.S.	
99	Loss	77–9–12 (1)	Jakob "Soldier" Bartfield	NWS	10	Nov 2, 1917	Broadway Auditorium, Buffalo, New York, U.S.	
98	Win	77–8–12 (1)	Gus Christie	PTS	8	Oct 23, 1917	Armory, Chattanooga, Tennessee, U.S.	
97	Win	76–8–12 (1)	Len Rowlands	NWS	10	Oct 19, 1917	Auditorium, Milwaukee, Wisconsin, U.S.	
96	Win	75–8–12 (1)	Gus Christie	NWS	10	Oct 11, 1917	Broadway Auditorium, Buffalo, New York, U.S.	
95	Win	74–8–12 (1)	Billy Kramer	NWS	6	Oct 6, 1917	National A.C., Pittsburgh, Pennsylvania, U.S.	
94	Win	73–8–12 (1)	Johnny Howard	TKO	9 (10)	Sep 25, 1917	Broadway S.C., Brooklyn, New York City, New York, U.S.	
93	Win	72–8–12 (1)	Battling Kopin	TKO	3 (10)	Sep 22, 1917	Skating Rink, Charleroi, Pennsylvania, U.S.	
92	Win	71–8–12 (1)	George K.O. Brown	TKO	9 (10)	Sep 17, 1917	Highland Park, Dayton, Ohio, U.S.	
91	Win	70–8–12 (1)	Jack London	TKO	9 (10)	Sep 14, 1917	St. Nicholas Arena, New York City, New York, U.S.	
90	Win	69–8–12 (1)	Jeff Smith	NWS	10	Sep 11, 1917	Auditorium, Milwaukee, Wisconsin, U.S.	
89	Win	68–8–12 (1)	Battling Levinsky	NWS	10	Sep 6, 1917	Forbes Field, Philadelphia, Pennsylvania, U.S.	
88	Win	67–8–12 (1)	Jack Dillon	NWS	10	Jul 30, 1917	Forbes Field, Philadelphia, Pennsylvania, U.S.	
87	Win	66–8–12 (1)	Buck Crouse	TKO	6 (10)	Jul 2, 1917	Exposition Hall, Pittsburgh, Pennsylvania, U.S.	
86	Win	65–8–12 (1)	Frank Mantell	KO	1 (10)	Jun 14, 1917	West End Theatre, Uniontown, Pennsylvania, U.S.	
85	Win	64–8–12 (1)	George Chip	NWS	10	May 22, 1917	Exposition Hall, Pittsburgh, Pennsylvania, U.S.	
84	Win	63–8–12 (1)	Jeff Smith	NWS	10	May 19, 1917	Broadway Auditorium, Buffalo, New York, U.S.	
83	Win	62–8–12 (1)	Harry Baker	KO	5 (10)	May 9, 1917	West End Theatre, Uniontown, Pennsylvania, U.S.	
82	Draw	61–8–12 (1)	Jackie Clark	PTS	20	May 3, 1917	Cumberland, Maryland, U.S.	
81	Win	61–8–11 (1)	Al McCoy	NWS	10	Apr 30, 1917	Exposition Hall, Pittsburgh, Pennsylvania, U.S.	
80	Win	60–8–11 (1)	Zulu Kid	NWS	6	Apr 16, 1917	Power Auditorium, Pittsburgh, Pennsylvania, U.S.	Not to be confused with Young Zulu Kid
79	Win	59–8–11 (1)	Al Rogers	NWS	10	Apr 14, 1917	Skating Rink, Charleroi, Pennsylvania, U.S.	
78	Win	58–8–11 (1)	Young Ahearn	KO	1 (6)	Apr 2, 1917	Power Auditorium, Pittsburgh, Pennsylvania, U.S.	
77	Win	57–8–11 (1)	Young Herman Miller	TKO	5 (10)	Mar 23, 1917	Southside Casino, Johnstown, Pennsylvania, U.S.	
76	Win	56–8–11 (1)	Tommy Gavigan	TKO	5 (6)	Mar 20, 1917	Palisades Rink, McKeesport, Pennsylvania, U.S.	
75	Win	55–8–11 (1)	Frankie Brennan	NWS	6	Mar 5, 1917	Power Auditorium, Pittsburgh, Pennsylvania, U.S.	
74	Win	54–8–11 (1)	Willie KO Brennan	NWS	10	Feb 12, 1917	Broadway Auditorium, Buffalo, New York, U.S.	
73	Loss	53–8–11 (1)	Mike Gibbons	NWS	6	Feb 10, 1917	National A.C., Pittsburgh, Pennsylvania, U.S.	
72	Win	53–7–11 (1)	Fay Keiser	PTS	20	Jan 29, 1917	Lonaconing, Maryland, U.S.	
71	Win	52–7–11 (1)	Jules Ritchie	TKO	4 (6)	Jan 20, 1917	National A.C., Philadelphia, Pennsylvania, U.S.	
70	Win	51–7–11 (1)	Eddie Coleman	KO	2 (10)	Jan 13, 1917	Skating Rink, Charleroi, Pennsylvania, U.S.	
69	Win	50–7–11 (1)	Joe Borrell	NWS	6	Jan 1, 1917	Power Auditorium, Pittsburgh, Pennsylvania, U.S.	
68	Win	49–7–11 (1)	Bob Moha	NWS	10	Dec 26, 1916	Broadway Auditorium, Buffalo, New York, U.S.	
67	Win	48–7–11 (1)	George K.O. Brown	NWS	6	Nov 27, 1916	Power Auditorium, Pittsburgh, Pennsylvania, U.S.	
66	Win	47–7–11 (1)	Tommy Burke	NWS	10	Nov 24, 1916	Broadway Auditorium, Buffalo, New York, U.S.	
65	Win	46–7–11 (1)	Willie KO Brennan	NWS	10	Nov 17, 1916	Broadway Auditorium, Buffalo, New York, U.S.	
64	Win	45–7–11 (1)	Jackie Clark	KO	3 (10)	Nov 14, 1916	Lonaconing, Maryland, U.S.	
63	Win	44–7–11 (1)	Willie KO Brennan	NWS	10	Nov 8, 1916	Carney Auditorium, Erie, Pennsylvania, U.S.	
62	Win	43–7–11 (1)	KO Sweeney	NWS	6	Nov 4, 1916	Power Auditorium, Pittsburgh, Pennsylvania, U.S.	
61	Win	42–7–11 (1)	Harry Baker	NWS	6	Oct 21, 1916	Power Auditorium, Pittsburgh, Pennsylvania, U.S.	
60	Win	41–7–11 (1)	Jackie Clark	PTS	10	Oct 16, 1916	Lonaconing, Maryland, U.S.	
59	Win	40–7–11 (1)	Fay Keiser	PTS	10	Sep 4, 1916	Cumberland, Maryland, U.S.	
58	Win	39–7–11 (1)	Jerry Cole	NWS	6	Aug 28, 1916	Power Auditorium, Pittsburgh, Pennsylvania, U.S.	
57	Win	38–7–11 (1)	Al Grayber	NWS	6	Aug 7, 1916	Power Auditorium, Pittsburgh, Pennsylvania, U.S.	
56	Loss	37–7–11 (1)	George Chip	NWS	10	Jun 26, 1916	Coliseum, New Castle, Pennsylvania, U.S.	
55	Win	37–6–11 (1)	Whitey Wenzel	NWS	10	Jun 17, 1916	New Kensington A.C., New Kensington, U.S.	
54	Win	36–6–11 (1)	Kid Manuel	KO	1 (6)	Jun 3, 1916	Power Auditorium, Pittsburgh, Pennsylvania, U.S.	
53	Win	35–6–11 (1)	Whitey Wenzel	NWS	6	May 6, 1916	Skating Rink, Charleroi, Pennsylvania, U.S.	
52	NC	34–6–11 (1)	Grant Clark	NC	6 (10)	Apr 27, 1916	Casino, Johnstown, Pennsylvania, U.S.	The referee stopped the fight and ruled a double disqualification because both men were fouling
51	Win	34–6–11	Kid Manuel	NWS	6	Apr 1, 1916	Power Auditorium, Pittsburgh, Pennsylvania, U.S.	
50	Draw	33–6–11	Walter Monaghan	NWS	6	Feb 26, 1916	Power Auditorium, Pittsburgh, Pennsylvania, U.S.	
49	Loss	33–6–10	Kid Graves	TKO	2 (6)	Dec 16, 1915	Power Auditorium, Pittsburgh, Pennsylvania, U.S.	Greb was forced to retire after, completely fracturing the radius of his left arm.
48	Loss	33–5–10	Tommy Gibbons	NWS	10	Nov 16, 1915	Auditorium, Saint Paul, Minnesota, U.S.	
47	Draw	33–4–10	George Chip	NWS	6	Oct 18, 1915	Duquesne Garden, Pittsburgh, Pennsylvania, U.S.	
46	Win	33–4–9	Al Rogers	NWS	6	Sep 13, 1915	Duquesne Garden, Pittsburgh, Pennsylvania, U.S.	
45	Win	32–4–9	Al Rogers	NWS	6	Aug 23, 1915	Duquesne Garden, Pittsburgh, Pennsylvania, U.S.	
44	Win	31–4–9	Fay Keiser	NWS	10	Jul 22, 1915	Moose Hall, Cumberland, Maryland, U.S.	
43	Win	30–4–9	George Hauser	KO	6 (6)	Jul 21, 1915	Knoxville Elks Club Picnic Grounds, Elwyn Grove, Pennsylvania, U.S.	
42	Win	29–4–9	Tommy Gavigan	NWS	6	Jul 12, 1915	Duquesne Garden, Pittsburgh, Pennsylvania, U.S.	
41	Draw	28–4–9	Fay Keiser	NWS	10	Jun 25, 1915	Cumberland, Maryland, U.S.	
40	Loss	28–4–8	Fay Keiser	NWS	6	May 31, 1915	West Side Basketball Hall, Connellsville, Pennsylvania, U.S.	
39	Win	28–3–8	Whitey Wenzel	NWS	6	May 24, 1915	Duquesne Garden, Pittsburgh, Pennsylvania, U.S.	
38	Draw	27–3–8	Joe Borrell	NWS	6	Apr 22, 1915	Duquesne Garden, Pittsburgh, Pennsylvania, U.S.	
37	Draw	27–3–7	Whitey Wenzel	NWS	6	Apr 15, 1915	East Liberty Hall, Pittsburgh, Pennsylvania, U.S.	
36	Win	27–3–6	Harry Baker	NWS	6	Mar 25, 1915	Duquesne Garden, Pittsburgh, Pennsylvania, U.S.	
35	Win	26–3–6	Jack Lavin	NWS	6	Mar 13, 1915	Palisades Rink, McKeesport, Pennsylvania, U.S.	
34	Win	25–3–6	Tommy Mack	NWS	6	Mar 6, 1915	West Bean street rink, Washington, Pennsylvania, U.S.	
33	Win	24–3–6	Whitey Wenzel	NWS	6	Mar 4, 1915	East Liberty Hall, Philadelphia, Pennsylvania, U.S.	
32	Win	23–3–6	Harry Baker	NWS	6	Feb 10, 1915	Duquesne Garden, Philadelphia, Pennsylvania, U.S.	
31	Win	22–3–6	Jack Blackburn	NWS	6	Jan 25, 1915	Duquesne Garden, Philadelphia, Pennsylvania, U.S.	
30	Draw	21–3–6	Billy Miske	NWS	6	Jan 12, 1915	Fairmont A.C., Philadelphia, Pennsylvania, U.S.	
29	Win	21–3–5	Howard Truesdale	NWS	6	Jan 8, 1915	Nonpareil A.C., Philadelphia, Pennsylvania, U.S.	
28	Win	20–3–5	Billy Donovan	NWS	6	Jan 1, 1915	Nonpareil A.C., Philadelphia, Pennsylvania, U.S.	
27	Loss	19–3–5	Joe Borrell	NWS	6	Dec 7, 1914	Olympia A.C., Philadelphia, Pennsylvania, U.S.	
26	Draw	19–2–5	Terry Martin	NWS	6	Nov 14, 1914	National A.C., Philadelphia, Pennsylvania, U.S.	
25	Win	19–2–4	Jack Fink	NWS	6	Sep 26, 1914	National A.C., Philadelphia, Pennsylvania, U.S.	
24	Win	18–2–4	John Foley	NWS	6	Aug 31, 1914	Waldemeier Hall, Pittsburgh, Pennsylvania, U.S.	
23	Draw	17–2–4	Whitey Wenzel	NWS	6	Aug 24, 1914	Waldemeier Hall, Pittsburgh, Pennsylvania, U.S.	
22	Win	17–2–3	Irish Gorgas	NWS	6	Aug 10, 1914	Waldemeier Hall, Pittsburgh, Pennsylvania, U.S.	
21	Win	16–2–3	George Lewis	NWS	10	Jul 27, 1914	Steubenville, Ohio, U.S.	
20	Win	15–2–3	John Foley	NWS	6	Jul 20, 1914	Waldemeier Hall, Pittsburgh, U.S.	
19	Win	14–2–3	Irish Gorgas	NWS	6	Jun 29, 1914	Waldemeier Hall, Pittsburgh, U.S.	
18	Win	13–2–3	Walter Monaghan	NWS	6	Jun 15, 1914	Waldemeier Hall, Pittsburgh, U.S.	
17	Draw	12–2–3	Whitey Wenzel	NWS	6	May 29, 1914	Academy Theater, Pittsburgh, U.S.	
16	Win	12–2–2	George Lewis	NWS	6	May 25, 1914	Southside Market House, Pittsburgh, Pennsylvania, U.S.	
15	Draw	11–2–2	Fay Keiser	NWS	6	May 13, 1914	Southside Market House, Pittsburgh, Pennsylvania, U.S.	
14	Win	11–2–1	Fay Keiser	NWS	6	Apr 14, 1914	Duquesne Garden, Pittsburgh, Pennsylvania, U.S.	
13	Win	10–2–1	Mickey Rodgers	DQ	5 (8)	Mar 2, 1914	Steubenville, Ohio, U.S.	
12	Win	9–2–1	Whitey Wenzel	NWS	6	Jan 10, 1914	Old City Hall, Pittsburgh, Pennsylvania, U.S.	
11	Win	8–2–1	Whitey Wenzel	NWS	6	Jan 1, 1914	Old City Hall, Pittsburgh, Pennsylvania, U.S.	
10	Win	7–2–1	Young Battling Nelson	TKO	3 (6)	Dec 12, 1913	Mishler Theatre, Altoona, Pennsylvania, U.S.	
9	Win	6–2–1	Battling Sherbine	NWS	6	Dec 6, 1913	Old City Hall, Pittsburgh, Pennsylvania, U.S.	
8	Loss	5–2–1	Joe Chip	KO	2 (6)	Nov 29, 1913	Old City Hall, Pittsburgh, Pennsylvania, U.S.	
7	Win	5–1–1	Mike Milko	NWS	6	Nov 17, 1913	Southside Market House, Pittsburgh, Pennsylvania, U.S.	
6	Draw	4–1–1	Mike Milko	NWS	6	Oct 22, 1913	Tariff Club, Pittsburgh, Pennsylvania, U.S.	
5	Loss	4–1	Harvey "Hooks" Evans	NWS	6	Oct 11, 1913	Old City Hall, Pittsburgh, Pennsylvania, U.S.	
4	Win	4–0	Lloyd Crutcher	KO	1 (6)	Aug 13, 1913	Punxsutawney, Pennsylvania, U.S.	
3	Win	3–0	Battling Murphy	TKO	2 (6)	Jul 19, 1913	Old City Hall, Pittsburgh, Pennsylvania, U.S.	
2	Win	2–0	Frank Kirkwood	NWS	6	May 29, 1913	Exposition Hall, Pittsburgh, Pennsylvania, U.S.	
1	Win	1–0	Red Cumpston	KO	2 (?)	May 8, 1913	East Liberty Hall, Pittsburgh, Pennsylvania, U.S.	

== Titles in boxing ==
=== Major world titles ===
- NYSAC middleweight champion (160 lbs)
- NBA (WBA) middleweight champion (160 lbs)

=== The Ring magazine titles ===
- The Ring middleweight champion (160 lbs)

=== Regional/International titles ===
- American light heavyweight champion (175 lbs)

=== Undisputed titles ===
- Undisputed middleweight champion

== See also ==
- List of middleweight boxing champions

Achievements
Regional boxing titles
Preceded by Gene Tunney	American light heavyweight champion May 23, 1922 – February 23, 1923	Succeeded by Gene Tunney
World boxing titles
Preceded by Johnny Wilson	World middleweight champion August 31, 1923 – February 26, 1926	Succeeded by Tiger Flowers
Middleweight status
Preceded by Stanley Ketchel	Latest born world champion to die October 22, 1926 – November 16, 1927	Succeeded by Tiger Flowers
