= Carded boxer =

A carded boxer is a boxing competitor who has been certified or carded to train and compete in the sport of boxing. The carding process requires registration with a boxing organization and a medical review.
