= St Catherine's Hospital, Doncaster =

St Catherine's Hospital
- Rotherham Doncaster and South Humber NHS Foundation Trust
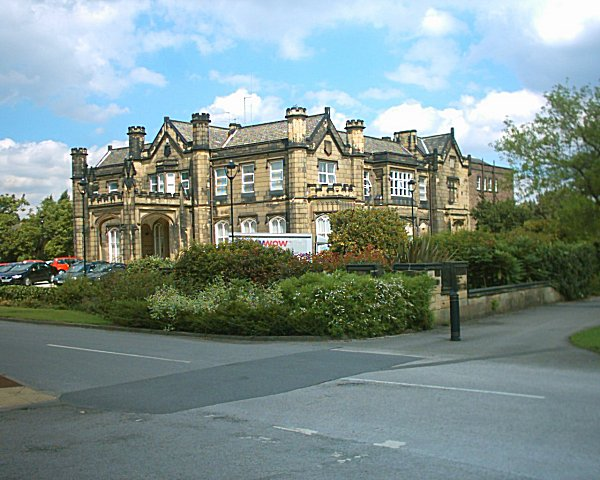
- St Catherine's Hospital

- Shown in South Yorkshire

Geography
- Location: Doncaster, South Yorkshire, England
- Coordinates: 53.495°N 1.146°W

Organisation
- Care system: NHS
- Type: Specialist

Services
- Emergency department: No
- Beds: 23
- Speciality: Psychiatry

History
- Founded: 1928

Links
- Website: www.rdash.nhs.uk
- Lists: Hospitals in England

St Catherine's Hospital was a mental healthcare hospital located in Doncaster, South Yorkshire, England, approximately three miles (4.8 km) from its centre. It is managed by Rotherham Doncaster and South Humber NHS Foundation Trust.

== History ==
St Catherine's Hall was built for George Banks, a local industrialist and former Lord Mayor of Leeds, in 1839. After the last member of the Banks family died, the house was auctioned and acquired by the Ministry of Health for use as a psychiatric facility becoming known as St Catherine's Institution in 1928.

After joining the National Health Service in 1948, the facility became St Catherine's Hospital in 1959. The hospital continued to provide mental health and learning disability services into 2010. It is located close to the Tickhill Road Hospital which is separate and provides a broader range of services.

In 2013 the hospital was renamed to St Catherine's House and was converted for use for a range of commercial purposes including office let, conference facilities and functions for the public. The building was brought under the management of Flourish Enterprises.

== See also ==
- List of hospitals in England
