= Tickhill Road Hospital =

- Rotherham Doncaster and South Humber NHS Foundation Trust
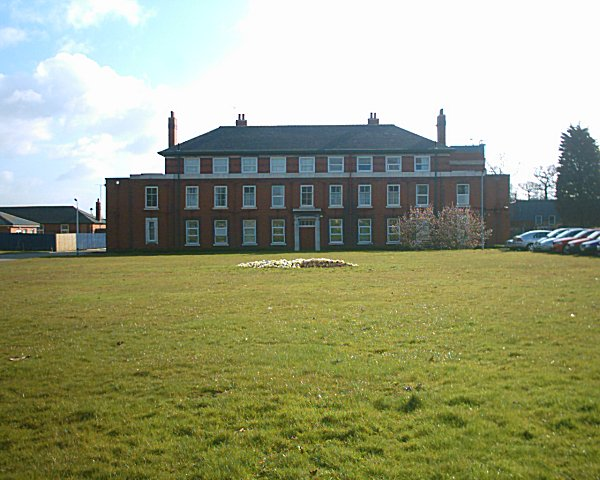
- Administration Block at Tickhill Road Hospital

- Shown in South Yorkshire

Geography
- Location: Doncaster, South Yorkshire, England
- Coordinates: 53.4983°N 1.1493°W

Organisation
- Care system: NHS
- Type: Specialist

Services
- Emergency department: No
- Speciality: Rehabilitation

History
- Founded: 1928

Links
- Website: www.rdash.nhs.uk
- Lists: Hospitals in England

The Tickhill Road Hospital is a small hospital at Tickhill Road in Doncaster, South Yorkshire. It is managed by the Rotherham Doncaster and South Humber NHS Foundation Trust.

== History ==
The hospital was built by Adshead, Topham and Adshead as an isolation hospital between 1928 and 1929. The hospital wards are named after trees with names such as Ash, Elm and Pine Wards and, more recently, Hazel Ward. It specialises in rehabilitation for older people before they return home. It is located close to the St Catherine's Hospital which is separate and provides mental health services.

== See also ==
- List of hospitals in England
