= Bassetlaw District General Hospital =

Hospital in Nottinghamshire, England

- Doncaster and Bassetlaw Teaching Hospitals NHS Foundation Trust
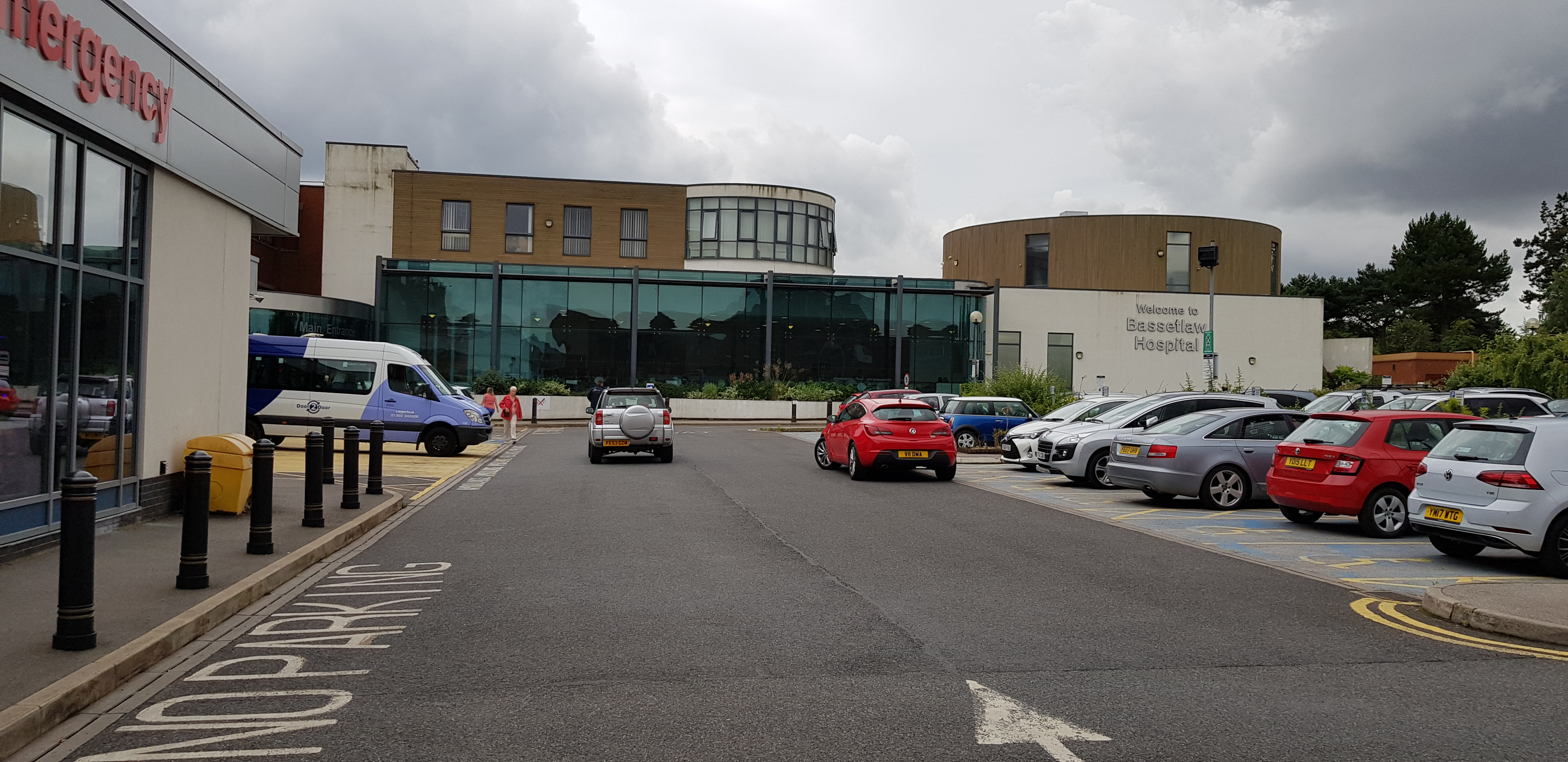
- Bassetlaw District General Hospital

- Shown in Nottinghamshire

Geography
- Location: Worksop, Nottinghamshire, England
- Coordinates: 53.3174°N 1.1098°W

Organisation
- Care system: NHS

Services
- Emergency department: Yes
- Beds: 170

History
- Founded: 1902

Links
- Website: www.dbth.nhs.uk

Bassetlaw District General Hospital is a National Health Service hospital in Worksop, Nottinghamshire. It is managed by the Doncaster and Bassetlaw Teaching Hospitals NHS Foundation Trust.

== History ==
The hospital has its origins in the Kilton Hill Infirmary, which was designed by Herbert Scalping and built by JH Vickers and which served as the local Poor Law Infirmary. It was opened by the local chairman of the poor law guardians in January 1902. The hospital administration block was extended in 1929 and pre-fabricated hut-style wards were added in 1939 in order to increase capacity. The hospital joined the National Health Service in 1948.

The hospital was completely rebuilt between 1982 and 1987 with the new facilities being officially opened by the Princess of Wales in September 1987. Following the demolition of the pre-fabricated hut-style wards in the early 1990s, a new coronary care unit and a new rehabilitation ward were completed in 1994 and a new CT scanner and breast cancer screening equipment arrived in 1997.

== Services ==
Following an inspection in January 2018 the Care Quality Commission reported that the hospital "needs improvement".

== See also ==
- List of hospitals in England
