= Doncaster Royal Infirmary =

- Doncaster and Bassetlaw Teaching Hospitals NHS Foundation Trust
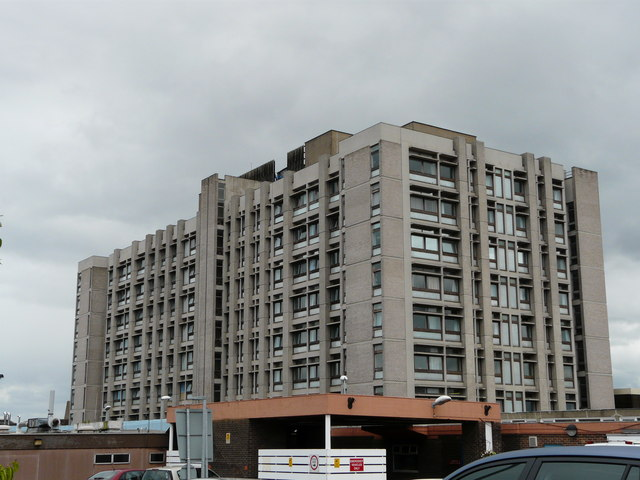
- A view of the hospital from the west, 2008

- Location in South Yorkshire

Geography
- Location: Doncaster, South Yorkshire, England
- Coordinates: 53.531°N 1.109°W

Organisation
- Care system: NHS
- Type: District General; Teaching

Services
- Emergency department: Yes
- Beds: 800

History
- Founded: 1792

Links
- Website: www.dbth.nhs.uk
- Lists: Hospitals in England

Doncaster Royal Infirmary is a district general hospital of 800 beds, located in Doncaster, South Yorkshire, England. It is managed by Doncaster and Bassetlaw Teaching Hospitals NHS Foundation Trust.

== History ==
=== Early history ===
Doncaster Royal Infirmary started life as the Doncaster Dispensary on French Gate (now Greyfriars Road) in 1792: the original two-storey building was erected at the cost of £665. This became the Doncaster General Infirmary and Dispensary in 1868 with 23 beds and the Doncaster Royal Infirmary and Dispensary in 1906.

Plans for a new hospital were developed after the First World War and a three-day fund-raising bazaar was opened by Princess Christian in March 1922. However a long debate over the site of the new hospital ensued and, after pressure from colliery and railway companies, a site on Thorne Road was decided upon. The foundation stone was laid by the Prince of Wales in 1926, and construction began in 1928, but funding fell short, as it relied wholly on local efforts. The lack of finances led to a smaller building than originally envisaged opening in 1930. This was the first part of the hospital, on Thorne Road (now the West Ward Block). The hospital was officially opened by the Earl of Lonsdale in 1935.

=== Second World War ===
At the outbreak of Second World War hutted wards of 200 beds were built in order to receive war wounded, as well as extra nursing accommodation required to staff the five huts.

=== Post war ===
The hospital joined the National Health Service in 1948. With the formation of the Doncaster Area Health Authority in 1974, Doncaster Royal Infirmary acted as a hub for a series of facilities encompassing Loversall Hospital, Tickhill Road Hospital, St Catherine's Hospital and Western Hospital. The East Ward Block of 390 beds was added in 1968, all but one of the hutted wards were demolished in 1969 (Hut 5 becoming the biochemistry department), the Women's Hospital was added in 1969, and the Children's Hospital in 1989.

== See also ==
- List of hospitals in England
