= Dick Power =

Wales boxer

Personal information
- Nationality: (Wales) Welsh
- Born: Richard John Power; 13 December 1903 Crumlin, Wales
- Weight: Heavyweight

Boxing career

Boxing record
- Total fights: 23
- Wins: 11
- Win by KO: 4
- Losses: 11
- Draws: 1

Richard John Power (13 December 1903 – unknown) was a Welsh professional heavyweight boxer. Born in Crumlin in Monmouthshire, Power became the Welsh heavyweight champion in 1926.

== Boxing career ==
Although there is little record of Power's amateur career, he is recorded on the 4 July 1925 as fighting professionally against Trevor Llewellyn at Lydney near the Wales/England border. Power took the fight on a points decision, and followed this with two wins in August, both in his home-town, over Eddie Wolf and Bill Bates. On 12 September, he faced Belgian Pierre Charles at The Ring in Blackfriars. Charles was the more experienced fighter, and would soon become Belgian and European heavyweight champion, but Power took the fight after Charles was forced to retire in the first round. He followed up this win by facing Con O'Kelly in an October fight in Manchester, losing by knockout in the third. 1925 ended with a challenge for the Welsh heavyweight title, arranged at the Palace Theatre in Crumlin on Boxing Day. His challenger was Tom Norris of Clydach Vale and the match was scheduled for fifteen three minutes rounds. The match only reached the eleventh round when Power was stopped via a technical knockout.

On 18 February 1926, Power travelled to London to face Joop Liet, 'The Singing Dutchman', but Power was heavily beaten losing by knockout in just the second round. Despite the loss on 5 April, Power was given a rematch with Tom Norris in a challenge for Norris' heavyweight title. The bout was contested at the Taff Vale Park in Pontypridd in front of a record crowd, with a purse of £150 as well as the title for stake. The twenty round contest went the full distance, and Power was declared victor on points decision making him the new Welsh heavyweight champion.

After taking the title there is an absence of fight information of Power until 1928 when he faced Jack Stanley, British heavyweight title challenger. Stanley was disqualified in the fourth. A week later, on 4 August, Power fought George Christian of Columbus, Ohio at Pontypridd, beating the American with a clean knockout in the second. His final recorded fight that year was a loss to Charlie Smith at The Ring. The following year he took in two bouts with New Zealander George Modrich; the first ended in defeat for Power via technical knockout in a fight held at Newport, while the rematch at Merthyr Tydfil was won by Power. Power completed 1929 with a loss to Don Shortland at Liverpool Stadium, before beating Dave Magill, the Irish heavyweight champion in an encounter at Pontypridd, followed by a loss to Jack Stanley and a draw with Marine Bill Trinder.

Power had three recorded matches in 1930, the first was to future Northern Area heavyweight champion Bob Carvill. The two met at the Royal Albert Hall, which saw Carvill disqualified in the second round. He then lost to both Reggie Meen, by technical knockout, and Jack Pettifer, on a points decision. In 1932 Power was challenged for his Welsh heavyweight belt by Cardiff's Jack Petersen. The two men met at Greyfriars Hall in Cardiff in a fifteen-round bout, but Power's defence was a short one being counted out within 21 seconds of the first round. Petersen went on to become British and European champion and was one of the great Welsh fighters of his time.

Power has two more recorded fights, both six years after his defeat to Petersen. He lost by points to another British champion, Welshman Gipsy Daniels and a win over South African heavyweight champion Don McCorkindale.
