= Harry Reeve =

English boxer

Personal information
- Nationality: British
- Born: Harry Isaacs; 7 January 1893 St. George's Hospital, London, England
- Died: 10 December 1958 (aged 65)
- Height: 5 ft 8 in (173 cm)
- Weight: Middleweight, light heavyweight

Boxing career

Boxing record
- Total fights: 153
- Wins: 81
- Win by KO: 23
- Losses: 50
- Draws: 20
- No contests: 1

Harry Isaacs (7 January 1893 – 10 December 1958), better known as Harry Reeve, was a British middleweight and cruiserweight boxer who was British Cruiserweight champion in 1916. At the time, the cruiserweight division was referred to as light heavyweight.

== Early life and career ==
Born in St. George's, London and based in Plaistow, Essex, the Jewish Isaacs fought under the name Harry Reeve and made his professional debut in 1910. Undefeated in his first 18 fights, he suffered his first loss in January 1912, to Harry Rudge, starting a run of nine fights where he won only two and lost five. He hit another winning streak in mid-1912, and despite a mixed record in 1913, got a shot at the vacant British middleweight title in February 1914 against Pat O'Keeffe, who won a points decision after 20 rounds.

Reeve moved up to light-heavyweight and beat British heavyweight champion Joe Beckett in December 1914 in a non-title bout.

A run of eight straight wins in 1915 and 1916 led to a fight for Dick Smith's British light-heavyweight title on 30 October 1916 at the National Sporting Club at Covent Gardens. Reeve won on points over 20 rounds to take the title and the Lonsdale Belt, gaining momentum in the last three rounds of the close bout. He relinquished the title before defending it. Light heavyweight division is usually classified as cruiserweight today. Reeve had already reached the rank of Lance Corporal in his service in WWI prior to winning the light-heavyweight title.

Reeve served in the 7th Middlesex Regiment and Military Police during his service with the British Army in the First World War. Before completing his service, he suffered a leg wound that hampered his subsequent career.

After the war, Reeve returned to boxing, losing to Joe Beckett in January 1919 after a fifth round stoppage. He continued to fight until 1934, his post-war career including losses to Bombardier Billy Wells, Eddie McGoorty, Mike McTigue, Gus Platts, and Phil Scott, draws with Scott (at the Royal Albert Hall in 1924) and Reggie Meen, and several fights against Senegalese fighter Battling Siki. He finished with a record of 79 wins from 150 professional fights.

== Life outside boxing ==
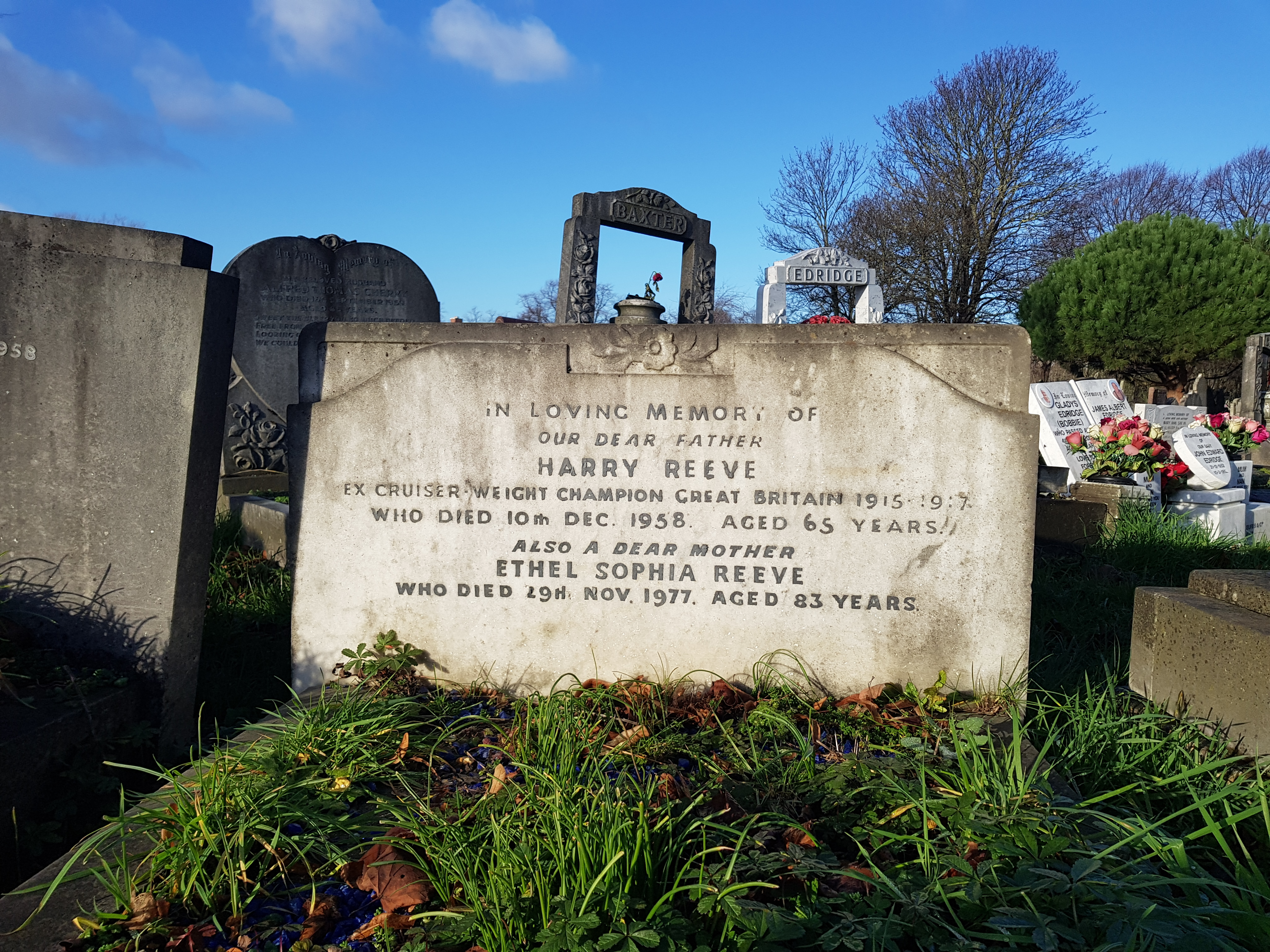
Reeve's grave in the East London Cemetery

Reeve married Ethel Sophia Stone in 1912, eventually having twelve children. He died on 10 December 1958.

== See also ==
- List of British light-heavyweight boxing champions
