= Tom Berry (boxer) =

English boxer (1890–1943)

Personal information
- Nationality: English
- Born: Tom Berry; February 14, 1890 Poplar, London, England
- Died: 1943 (52) Greensboro, North Carolina, United States
- Weight: light heavy/heavyweight

Boxing career

Boxing record
- Total fights: 71
- Wins: 43 (KO 13)
- Losses: 32 (KO 10)
- Draws: 5
- No contests: 0

Tom Berry (February 14, 1890 – 1943) was an English professional light-heavy and heavyweight boxer active from the 1910s to the 1930s. He won the National Sporting Club (NSC) subsequently known as the British Boxing Board of Control, the British Light Heavyweight title and the British Empire Light Heavyweight title.

Berry's professional fighting weight varied from 167 1/2 lb (76.0 kg; 11 st 13.5 lb) as a Light heavyweight boxer to 187 1/2 lb (85.0 kg; 13 st 5.5 lb) as a heavyweight boxer.

== Boxing career ==
=== Professional ===
On 16 April 1918, Tom Berry's first professional boxing match was against Ben Kelly, to whom he lost on points at Haagsche Zoo, The Hague, Netherlands. Despite this initial defeat, he emerged victorious in the following bouts:

- A knockout victory over Corporal Sutherland at Hexham Abbey Sports Ground on 17 June 1918.
- A points victory over Corporal Hunter at Haagsche Zoo, The Hague, Netherlands on 22 June 1918.
- A technical knockout victory over Corporal Ward at Haagsche Zoo, The Hague, the Netherlands on 22 June 1918.
- A technical knockout victory over Henry JJ Placke (Netherlands) at Haagsche Zoo, The Hague, the Netherlands on 6 July 1918.
- A knockout victory over Morralour at Rotterdam, Netherlands on 1 January 1919.

Throughout the 1920s, Berry's career saw a mix of wins, losses and draws:

- Against French boxer Paul Journee, Berry achieved four wins, suffered three defeats and managed one draw finally losing via a technical knockout defeat.
- He had one win, then a points defeat, followed by a points victory over Battling Siki (Senegal) at Circus Schouwburg, Rotterdam, Netherlands (17 July 1920 and 30 August 1920).
- After two wins, one defeat and one draw, Berry eventually suffered a knockout defeat by Soldier Horace Jones in Paris, France on 1 January 1921.
- He had one win against Bert Kenny (Canada), before suffering a knockout defeat at The Ring, Southwark, London on 25 February 1921.
- Against Marcel Nilles (France), Berry achieved four wins, followed by eight defeats and finally a knockout defeat at Salle Wagram, Paris on 22 November 1922.
- After five wins, Berry achieved a technical knockout victory over Harold Rolph (Canada) at Victoria Baths, Nottingham on 24 January 1924.
- Berry achieved three wins and suffered one defeat against Charlie Ring (Australia), before winning a points victory at the National Sporting Club, Covent Garden, London on 17 November 1924.

Berry earned his first title after a points victory over Syd Pape, winning the British light heavyweight title at the National Sporting Club, Covent Garden, London on 9 March 1925. Following this success, his career continued to see a mixture of highs and lows:

- Against Harry (Rocky) Knight (Barbados), Berry achieved one win before suffering three defeats. However, he went on to win a points victory at Drill Hall, Bristol on 19 February 1926.
- Against Tom Heeney (New Zealand), he had one win and one draw before losing on points at The Ring, Southwark, London on 5 July 1926.

Berry's second title came after a points victory over Dave Magill. This event saw him achieve the British Empire Light heavyweight title at King's Hall, Belle Vue, Manchester on 31 January 1927. He later lost on points to Gipsy Daniels while defending the British light heavyweight title and British Empire Light heavyweight title at Holland Park Rink, Kensington, London on 25 April 1927.

After this, Berry suffered a string of defeats, including:

- One defeat, then a technical knockout by Ted Sandwina (United States) at Premierland, Whitechapel, London on 13 November 1927.
- One win, one defeat, a 15-month layoff, then a points defeat by Johnny Widd (Sweden) at Lorensbergs Cirkus, Gothenburg, Sweden on 31 May 1929.
- A points defeat by Antonio Sebastiao (Brazil) at Estadio do Covelo, Gondomar, Portugal on 21 September 1929, followed by an 11-month layoff.

In Tom Berry's final professional boxing match, he lost by technical knockout defeat against Jack Pettifer at Holborn Stadium, London on 17 November 1930.
