= Hein Müller =

German boxer

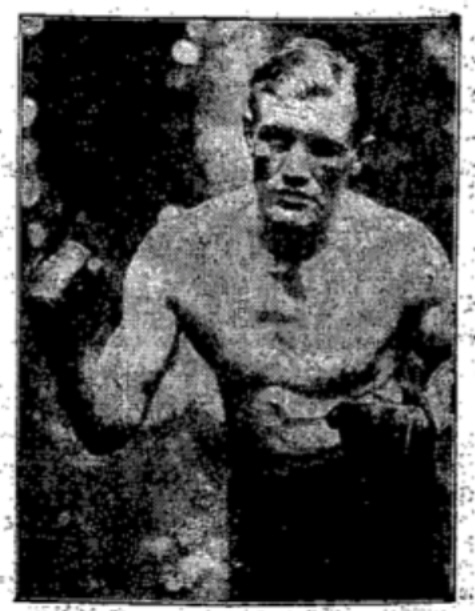

Personal information
- Nationality: German
- Born: 6 December 1903 Cologne, German Empire
- Died: 29 April 1945 (aged 41) Berlin, Germany
- Height: 6 ft 1.5 in (187 cm)
- Weight: Light heavyweight, heavyweight
- Cause of death: Killed in action

Boxing career

Boxing record
- Total fights: 47
- Wins: 32
- Win by KO: 7
- Losses: 8
- Draws: 5
Medal record
Men's amateur boxing
Representing Germany
European Amateur Championships
Gold medal – first place	1927 Berlin	Light heavyweight
Bronze medal – third place	1925 Stockholm	Welterweight

Hein Müller (6 December 1903 – 29 April 1945) was a German boxer, who was a champion of Europe as both an amateur and a professional. He won German amateur titles at three weights, was European amateur champion at light heavyweight, and as a professional won the German and European heavyweight titles.

== Career ==
Born in Cologne, Müller first had success as an amateur. He won a bronze medal at the 1925 European Championships in Stockholm in the welterweight division, and in 1927 in Berlin, he won gold at light heavyweight. He won the German national championship three times, in 1925 at welterweight, in 1926 at middleweight, and in 1927 at light heavyweight.

In 1927, Müller turned professional, making his pro debut at light heavyweight in April that year. He was unbeaten in close to twenty fights by the end of 1928, including wins over former Scandinavian middleweight champion Martin Tancred, future French champion Abel Argote, former German (VDF) heavyweight champion Hans Breitenstraeter, the only fight he failed to win during this period a controversial draw with future British champion Harry Crossley which resulted in the referee being suspended by the German authorities and Crossley instructed to omit the fight from his record.

In February 1929 he beat Hein Heeser on points over 15 rounds to take the VDF German light heavyweight title. He followed this two months later with a points win over Gipsy Daniels. In June 1929 he challenged for Michele Bonaglia's IBU European light heavyweight title in Turin, the Italian stopping him in the fourth round.

Müller moved up to heavyweight, and after a draw with German (VDF) champion Hans Schoenrath in a non-title fight in November 1930, faced him with the title at stake in February 1931. Müller took a points decision to become German heavyweight champion. In August he beat Pierre Charles on points to take the IBU European heavyweight title. He was stripped of the title after failing to fight mandatory challenger Otto von Porat. In January 1932 he beat Reggie Meen at the Granby Halls in Leicester, Meen being forced to stop in the fourth round due to an eye injury. The fight was subsequently recognized by the IBU as a European title fight, with Müller regaining the title.

He had been due to fight Larry Gains early in 1932, but he was forced to withdraw due to a badly-bruised chest, with Don McCorkindale taking his place. He suffered only the second defeat of his professional career in April 1932, when he was beaten on points by McCorkindale at the Royal Albert Hall, McCorkindale a substitute for Gains who had injured his thumb (the agreed fight with Gains required the lifting of the colour bar that had been in place at the venue since 1923), and in his next fight, in May, lost his European title, with Charles taking a points verdict to regain his title.

Müller's career never recovered, winning only two of his last nine fights (over Hans Schoenrath and Gustave Limousin), suffering knockouts at the hands of von Porat and Jack Petersen (in front of 50,000 spectators at Ninian Park), and failing in three attempts to take the BDB German heavyweight title from Vincenz Hower. In April 1934, Müller announced his decision to retire from boxing and return to his former profession as a baker. He did, however, return for one more fight, an eighth-round stoppage loss to Erwin Klein in November 1934. He retired with a record of 32 wins from 47 fights.

After retiring from boxing, Müller took up professional wrestling, competing in the UK in the late 1930s.

During World War II, Müller was initially exempted from military service due to an eye condition, but in March 1945 he was enrolled into the Volkssturm. He was shot dead by Allied forces during fighting for Berlin on 29 April 1945.
