= Trevor Llewellyn =

Wales boxer

Personal information
- Nationality: British
- Born: 20 December 1897 Newport, Wales
- Died: 1981 (aged 83–84)
- Weight: Heavyweight

Boxing career

Boxing record
- Total fights: 16
- Wins: 4
- Win by KO: 2
- Losses: 12
- Draws: 0

Trevor Llewellyn (20 December 1897 – 1981) was a Welsh professional heavyweight boxer. Born in Newport in Monmouthshire, Llewellyn became the Welsh heavyweight champion in 1922. A police officer by profession, he often fought under the name PC Trevor Llewellyn.

== Personal history ==
Llewellyn was born in Newport to George and Alice Maud. He married Rhoda Welsher and they had two daughters. He joined the police force and worked at Newport Docks.

== Boxing career ==
Little is recorded of Llewellyn's amateur career, though a professional fight, against fellow Welshman Gipsy Daniels is recorded on 1 April 1922. The fight took place at Stow Hill Drill Hall in Newport, with the bout being given to Daniels on points decision after the contest went the distance of fifteen rounds. Two months later Llewellyn fought again in Newport, knocking out Jack Tyrell of Cardiff in the sixth. He then faced and beat Bob Allison on 3 July. On 19 August 1922, Llewellyn met Tom Norris of Clydach Vale for the Welsh heavyweight championship. Contested at the Empire Music Hall in Newport, the fight was scheduled for twenty rounds, but Llewellyn managed to stop Norris through a technical knockout in the third, becoming the Welsh champion.

After losing by points to Guardsman Charlie Penewill at the start of October 1922, Llewellyn faced Australian heavyweight champion Albert 'Kid' Lloyd. The Lloyd fight gives one of the best recordings of Llewellyn's fighting style with a report in The Mercury on 1 November. The article describes how Llewellyn was known as the "White Hope" to Welsh boxing fans, though Lloyd is said to have led with the better strategy, by attacking aggressively in the opening rounds. The reporter mentions that Llewellyn had a dangerous left, though in the Lloyd fight his early punishment exhausted him from employing it. Llewellyn retired from the fight in the thirteenth.

Llewellyn's record after becoming Welshheavyweight champion is poor, with only one win recorded up to 1925. He faced Tom Norris again in 1924, but lost on points. In 1925 he is recorded as losing three fights; Charlie Smith in Cardiff, Northern Area heavyweight champion Con O'Kelly in Hull and future Welsh heavyweight champion Dick Power.
