= Gipsy Daniels =

Wales boxer

Personal information
- Nationality: Welsh
- Born: William Daniel; 9 February 1903 Llanelli, Wales
- Died: June 1967 (aged 64) Plymouth, England
- Weight: Light-heavyweight

Boxing career
- Stance: Orthodox

Boxing record
- Total fights: 152
- Wins: 95
- Win by KO: 37
- Losses: 44
- Draws: 13

William "Gipsy" Daniels (9 February 1903 – June 1967), was a Welsh Light-heavyweight boxing champion of Britain who, in an eighteen-year career, took in 141 contests, including eight fights in New York City, and notably knocked out Max Schmeling in the first round of a 1928 encounter.

There is some confusion as to Daniels' actual name and place of birth. Though a definitive answer was given in Tony Lee's 2009 publication which printed a copy of his birth certificate. Daniels was born in Llanelli on 9 February 1903 as William Daniel to David John Daniel and Francis Ann Roberts. His father was a successful rugby player who represented Llanelli and Wales.

== Boxing career ==
Daniels began his career boxing in contests in his home area of South Wales, and as an eighteen-year-old he fought under the name "Young Daniel" as a middleweight. By the end of 1920 he was boxing in Kent, and managed to win a couple of fights against similarly inexperienced opposition. On 24 February 1921, Daniels fought his first veteran boxer when he was carded to face Belgian Rene DeVos at The Ring in Blackfriars, London. DeVos already had 58 bouts under his belt, 37 of them wins, including a defeat over Daniels' fellow countryman Frank Moody. Daniels lost the 20 round fight on points.

By the end of 1921, Daniels had amassed a fighting record of eleven wins, six losses and two draws. In March 1922 he won a heavyweight competition at Blackfriars, and in October of that year he was fighting at the Pioneer Sporting Club in New York. It was around this time that Daniels was introduced to James J. Johnston, a local boxing promoter. Johnston decided that Daniels needed a gimmick to sell himself to the public, and decided that he looked "like a gypsy". Johnston took Daniels to a Woolworths five-and-ten-cent store and dressed him in cheap bandanna headscarves and hooped earrings. Johnston dubbed him 'Gypsey Daniels', though the most commonly used spelling of his nickname was 'Gipsy'. Daniels fought eight times in New York, including two contests at Madison Square Garden, before returning to Great Britain.

Daniels continued fighting in Wales and England, but in September 1925 he travelled to mainland Europe for the first time in his career, to face Swedish boxer Harry Persson at the Cirkus in Stockholm. Although Daniels lost the bout on points, on his return to Britain he began his most successful period of boxing, remaining undefeated for the next 18 fights. After a win over Frank Moody in April 1927 which earned him the Welsh Light Heavyweight belt, Daniels faced Tom Berry for the British Light-Heavyweight Championship Belt. Daniels won the 20 round bout on points, but he faced a dilemma as to whether to defend the title as the National Sporting Club (NSC), who controlled boxing in Great Britain, offered far lower purses than outside promoters. Daniels chose to fight for a non-NSC affiliated promoter to maximise his income, giving up his newly acquired title.

In January 1928, Daniels lost a bout to German, Max Schmeling followed by a defeat to Len Johnson, but in a rematch with Schmeling on 25 February he knocked out the German in the first round. Daniels career continued without the success of his earlier years, losing twice to Walter Neusel in Germany, but beating and drawing with Jack London before London became British and Commonwealth Champion.

== Professional boxing record ==
166 fights	103 wins	47 losses
By knockout	42	5
By decision	61	39
By disqualification	0	3
Draws	15	
No contests	1	

No.	Result	Record	Opponent	Type	Round	Date	Age	Location	Notes
166	Win	103–47–15 (1)	Alf Robinson	PTS	8	May 12, 1938	35 years, 92 days	Vetch Field, Swansea, Wales, UK	
165	Win	102–47–15 (1)	Dick Power	PTS	10	Mar 8, 1938	35 years, 27 days	Mannesmann Hall, Swansea, Wales, UK	
164	Win	101–47–15 (1)	Jeff Wilson	PTS	12	Nov 3, 1937	34 years, 267 days	Westover Ice Rink, Bournemouth, Dorset, England, UK	
163	Draw	100–47–15 (1)	Jim McKenzie	PTS	10	Oct 7, 1937	34 years, 240 days	Tiverton, Devon, England, UK	
162	Win	100–47–14 (1)	Fred Rowlands	PTS	12	Jul 29, 1937	34 years, 170 days	Athletic Ground, Tiverton, Devon, England, UK	
161	Loss	99–47–14 (1)	George Bennett	DQ	3 (10)	Feb 8, 1937	34 years, 27 days	Central Hall, Derby, Derbyshire, England, UK	
160	Win	99–46–14 (1)	Frank Borrington	KO	5 (10)	Jan 25, 1937	33 years, 351 days	King's Hall, Derby, Derbyshire, England, UK	
159	Win	98–46–14 (1)	Jim Young	TKO	7 (10)	Dec 3, 1936	33 years, 298 days	Swadlincote, Derbyshire, England, UK	
158	Loss	97–46–14 (1)	Al Conquest	PTS	10	Dec 3, 1934	31 years, 297 days	King's Hall, Derby, Derbyshire, England, UK	
157	Win	97–45–14 (1)	Teddy Phillips	PTS	12	Jun 11, 1934	31 years, 122 days	Greyhound Stadium, Derby, Derbyshire, England, UK	
156	Loss	96–45–14 (1)	George Bennett	PTS	12	Mar 26, 1934	31 years, 45 days	Derby, Derbyshire, England, UK	
155	Win	96–44–14 (1)	Tony Arpino	KO	8 (12)	Mar 19, 1934	31 years, 38 days	Corn Exchange, Bedford, Bedfordshire, England, UK	
154	Draw	95–44–14 (1)	Frank Borrington	PTS	12	Mar 5, 1934	31 years, 24 days	King's Hall, Derby, Derbyshire, England, UK	
153	Win	95–44–13 (1)	Joe Edwards	PTS	10	Dec 26, 1933	30 years, 320 days	Working Men's Club, Llanelli, Wales, UK	
152	Win	94–44–13 (1)	Reggie Meen	PTS	10	Nov 27, 1933	30 years, 291 days	Granby Halls, Leicester, Leicestershire, England, UK	
151	Draw	93–44–13 (1)	Frank Borrington	PTS	12	Nov 13, 1933	30 years, 277 days	King's Hall, Derby, Derbyshire, UK	
150	Draw	93–44–12 (1)	Jack London	PTS	12	Jul 31, 1933	30 years, 172 days	Engineers Club Grounds, West Hartlepool, County Durham, England, UK	
149	Win	93–44–11 (1)	Jack London	PTS	12	Jul 17, 1933	30 years, 158 days	Engineers Club Grounds, West Hartlepool, County Durham, England, UK	
148	Win	92–44–11 (1)	Jeff Wilson	TKO	4 (12)	Jun 26, 1933	30 years, 137 days	Effingham Street Stadium, Rotherham, Yorkshire, England, UK	
147	Loss	91–44–11 (1)	Harry Crossley	PTS	12	May 14, 1933	30 years, 94 days	Effingham Street Stadium, Rotherham, Yorkshire, England, UK	
146	Win	91–43–11 (1)	Frank Borrington	KO	13 (15)	Apr 15, 1933	30 years, 65 days	Working Men's Club, Llanelli, Wales, UK	
145	Win	90–43–11 (1)	Jack London	RTD	7 (12)	Apr 10, 1933	30 years, 60 days	Merthyr Tydfil, Wales, UK	
144	Win	89–43–11 (1)	Jack Strongbow	TKO	7 (12)	Feb 20, 1933	30 years, 11 days	Madeley Street Baths, Hull, Yorkshire, England, UK	
143	Loss	88–43–11 (1)	Salvatore Ruggirello	TKO	11 (15)	Jan 26, 1933	29 years, 352 days	The Stadium, Liverpool, Merseyside, England, UK	
142	Win	88–42–11 (1)	Ted Gater	TKO	14 (15)	Jan 2, 1933	29 years, 328 days	Madeley Street Baths, Hull, Yorkshire, England, UK	
141	Loss	87–42–11 (1)	Walter Neusel	PTS	10	Nov 26, 1932	29 years, 291 days	Festhalle, Frankfurt, Germany	
140	Win	87–41–11 (1)	Bernard Cook	PTS	15	Nov 5, 1932	29 years, 270 days	Mannesmann Hall, Swansea, Wales, UK	
139	Loss	86–41–11 (1)	Del Fontaine	PTS	15	Oct 15, 1932	29 years, 249 days	Working Men's Club, Llanelli, Wales, UK	
138	Win	86–40–11 (1)	Rene Morris	PTS	10	Aug 13, 1932	29 years, 186 days	Drill Hall, Falmouth, Cornwall, England, UK	
137	Win	85–40–11 (1)	Guardsman George Gater	PTS	12	Apr 11, 1932	29 years, 62 days	Victoria Hall, Nottingham, Nottinghamshire, England, UK	
136	Loss	84–40–11 (1)	Harry Crossley	PTS	15	Feb 29, 1932	29 years, 20 days	Madeley Street Baths, Hull, Yorkshire, England, UK	
135	Loss	84–39–11 (1)	Pierre Charles	PTS	10	Jan 30, 1932	28 years, 355 days	Théâtre des Variétés, Charleroi, Belgium	
134	Loss	84–38–11 (1)	Don McCorkindale	PTS	12	Oct 19, 1931	28 years, 252 days	Granby Halls, Leicester, Leicestershire, England, UK	
133	Win	84–37–11 (1)	Lode Wuestenraedt	KO	9 (15)	Sep 3, 1931	28 years, 206 days	T & T Rink, Bridlington, Yorkshire, England, UK	
132	Loss	83–37–11 (1)	Walter Neusel	PTS	10	Jul 31, 1931	28 years, 172 days	Sportplatz Allee Altona, Altona, Germany	
131	Loss	83–36–11 (1)	Ernst Pistulla	PTS	10	Jun 5, 1931	28 years, 116 days	Dirt-Track Bahn, Germany	
130	Draw	83–35–11 (1)	Jack Stanley	PTS	15	Mar 30, 1931	28 years, 49 days	Colston Hall, Bristol, Avon, England, UK	
129	Win	83–35–10 (1)	Jack Humbeeck	PTS	15	Mar 16, 1931	28 years, 35 days	Madeley Street Baths, Hull, Yorkshire, England, UK	
128	Win	82–35–10 (1)	Don Shortland	PTS	15	Feb 9, 1931	28 years, 0 days	Madeley Street Baths, Hull, Yorkshire, England, UK	
127	Loss	81–35–10 (1)	Theo Sas	PTS	15	Feb 2, 1931	27 years, 358 days	Madeley Street Baths, Hull, Yorkshire, England, UK	
126	Win	81–34–10 (1)	Bob Carvill	TKO	13 (15)	Jan 19, 1931	27 years, 344 days	Madeley Street Baths, Hull, Yorkshire, England, UK	
125	Loss	80–34–10 (1)	Bob Carvill	DQ	3 (15)	Jan 5, 1931	27 years, 330 days	Madeley Street Baths, Hull, Yorkshire, England, UK	
124	Win	80–33–10 (1)	Jack Stanley	PTS	15	Oct 27, 1930	27 years, 260 days	Greenwich Baths, Greenwich, London, England, UK	
123	Win	79–33–10 (1)	Joe Mullings	KO	6 (15)	Oct 19, 1930	27 years, 252 days	Palais de Danse, West Bromwich, West Midlands, England, UK	
122	Win	78–33–10 (1)	Farrier Berwick	KO	7 (15)	Sep 29, 1930	27 years, 232 days	Rink Market, Smethwick, West Midlands, England, UK	
121	Loss	77–33–10 (1)	Frank Moody	PTS	15	Aug 4, 1930	27 years, 176 days	Sloper Road Greyhound Track, Cardiff, Wales, UK	Lost BBBofC Welsh Area light heavyweight title
120	Loss	77–32–10 (1)	Reggie Meen	PTS	15	Jul 21, 1930	27 years, 162 days	Granby Halls, Leicester, Leicestershire, England, UK	
119	Loss	77–31–10 (1)	Harry Crossley	PTS	15	Apr 15, 1930	27 years, 65 days	Granby Halls, Leicester, Leicestershire, England, UK	
118	Win	77–30–10 (1)	Farrier Berwick	KO	7 (15)	Apr 5, 1930	27 years, 55 days	Holmeside Stadium, Sunderland, Tyne and Wear, England, UK	
117	Win	76–30–10 (1)	Reggie Meen	RTD	9 (15)	Mar 25, 1930	27 years, 44 days	Granby Halls, Leicester, Leicestershire, England, UK	
116	Win	75–30–10 (1)	Billy Adair	PTS	15	Feb 25, 1930	27 years, 16 days	Lime Grove Baths, Shepherd's Bush, London, England, UK	
115	Loss	74–30–10 (1)	Louis Guillaume	DQ	4 (15)	Jan 20, 1930	26 years, 345 days	The Ring, Blackfriars Road, Southwark, London, England, UK	
114	Loss	74–29–10 (1)	Helmut Hartkopp	PTS	8	Dec 7, 1929	26 years, 301 days	Zirkus Busch, Mitte, Germany	
113	Loss	74–28–10 (1)	Michele Bonaglia	KO	8 (?)	Oct 12, 1929	26 years, 245 days	Torino, Italy	
112	Loss	74–27–10 (1)	Maurice Griselle	PTS	12	Sep 24, 1929	26 years, 227 days	Cirque de Paris, Paris, France	
111	Loss	74–26–10 (1)	Harry Crossley	PTS	15	Aug 26, 1929	26 years, 198 days	Doncaster Racecourse, Doncaster, Yorkshire, England, UK	
110	Loss	74–25–10 (1)	Hein Müller	PTS	10	Apr 12, 1929	26 years, 62 days	Rheinlandhalle, Cologne, Germany	
109	Loss	74–24–10 (1)	Franz Diener	PTS	10	Mar 8, 1929	26 years, 27 days	Sportpalast, Schoeneberg, Germany	
108	Loss	74–23–10 (1)	Jimmy Mendes	PTS	15	Jan 21, 1929	25 years, 347 days	The Ring, Blackfriars Road, Southwark, London, England, UK	
107	Win	74–22–10 (1)	Jack Stanley	PTS	15	Aug 11, 1928	25 years, 184 days	Greyhound Stadium, Harringay, London, England, UK	
106	Win	73–22–10 (1)	Hein Domgörgen	KO	2 (10)	Apr 22, 1928	25 years, 73 days	Achilleion, Leipzig, Germany	
105	Win	72–22–10 (1)	Hans Breitensträter	KO	2 (10)	Mar 31, 1928	25 years, 51 days	Festhalle, Frankfurt, Germany	
104	Win	71–22–10 (1)	Max Schmeling	KO	1 (10)	Feb 25, 1928	25 years, 16 days	Festhalle, Frankfurt, Germany	
103	Loss	70–22–10 (1)	Len Johnson	PTS	15	Jan 23, 1928	24 years, 348 days	The Ring, Blackfriars Road, Southwark, London, England, UK	
102	Loss	70–21–10 (1)	Max Schmeling	PTS	10	Dec 2, 1927	24 years, 296 days	Sportpalast, Schoeneberg, Germany	
101	Win	70–20–10 (1)	Emile Morelle	KO	2 (15)	Nov 21, 1927	24 years, 285 days	The Ring, Blackfriars Road, Southwark, London, England, UK	
100	Win	69–20–10 (1)	Arthur Vermaut	KO	5 (15)	Nov 7, 1927	24 years, 271 days	The Ring, Blackfriars Road, Southwark, London, England, UK	
99	Loss	68–20–10 (1)	Frank Fowler	PTS	15	Sep 8, 1927	24 years, 211 days	The Ring, Blackfriars Road, Southwark, London, England, UK	
98	Win	68–19–10 (1)	Tom Berry	PTS	20	Apr 25, 1927	24 years, 75 days	Holland Park Rink, Kensington, London, England, UK	Retained BBBofC Welsh Area light heavyweight title; Won vacant Commonwealth light heavyweight title
97	Win	67–19–10 (1)	Frank Moody	PTS	20	Apr 11, 1927	24 years, 61 days	The Ring, Blackfriars Road, Southwark, London, England, UK	Won vacant BBBofC Welsh Area light heavyweight title
96	Win	66–19–10 (1)	Alfred Baker	KO	12 (15)	Mar 21, 1927	24 years, 40 days	The Ring, Blackfriars Road, Southwark, London, England, UK	
95	Draw	65–19–10 (1)	Pierre Charles	PTS	15	Feb 7, 1927	23 years, 363 days	The Ring, Blackfriars Road, Southwark, London, England, UK	
94	Draw	65–19–9 (1)	Pierre Charles	PTS	15	Dec 20, 1926	23 years, 314 days	Alexandra Theatre, Birmingham, West Midlands, England, UK	
93	Win	65–19–8 (1)	Fernand DeLarge	PTS	10	Dec 9, 1926	23 years, 303 days	Royal Albert Hall, Kensington, London, England, UK	
92	Win	64–19–8 (1)	Fernand DeLarge	PTS	15	Nov 2, 1926	23 years, 266 days	National Sporting Club, Covent Garden, London, England, UK	
91	Win	63–19–8 (1)	Constant Barrick	PTS	10	Oct 5, 1926	23 years, 238 days	Cirque de Paris, Paris, France	
90	Win	62–19–8 (1)	Paul Samson Körner	TKO	6 (12)	Sep 19, 1926	23 years, 222 days	Radrennbahn Treptow, Germany	
89	Draw	61–19–8 (1)	Jack Stanley	PTS	15	Sep 6, 1926	23 years, 209 days	The Ring, Blackfriars Road, Southwark, London, England, UK	
88	Win	61–19–7 (1)	Marine Bill Trinder	KO	6 (15)	Aug 15, 1926	23 years, 187 days	The Ring, Blackfriars Road, Southwark, London, England, UK	
87	Win	60–19–7 (1)	Raoul Paillaux	KO	2 (15)	Jul 19, 1926	23 years, 160 days	The Ring, Blackfriars Road, Southwark, London, England, UK	
86	Win	59–19–7 (1)	Marcel Nilles	PTS	10	Jun 9, 1926	23 years, 120 days	Salle Wagram, Paris, France	
85	Win	58–19–7 (1)	Francois Charles	PTS	10	Apr 1, 1926	23 years, 51 days	Velodrome d'Hiver, Paris, France	
84	Win	57–19–7 (1)	Jim Slater	KO	3 (15)	Mar 1, 1926	23 years, 20 days	Cossington Street Baths, Leicester, Leicestershire, England, UK	
83	Win	56–19–7 (1)	Marine Bill Trinder	PTS	15	Dec 19, 1925	22 years, 313 days	The Ring, Blackfriars Road, Southwark, London, England, UK	
82	Win	55–19–7 (1)	Charlie Chetwynd	PTS	10	Dec 14, 1925	22 years, 308 days	Alexandra Theatre, Birmingham, England, UK	
81	Win	54–19–7 (1)	Leon Randol	PTS	20	Nov 16, 1925	22 years, 280 days	The Ring, Blackfriars Road, Southwark, London, England, UK	
80	Loss	53–19–7 (1)	Harry Persson	PTS	15	Sep 24, 1925	22 years, 227 days	Cirkus, Stockholm, Sweden	
79	Loss	53–18–7 (1)	Phil Scott	PTS	15	Aug 29, 1925	22 years, 201 days	The Ring, Blackfriars Road, Southwark, London, England, UK	
78	Draw	53–17–7 (1)	Soldier Jones	PTS	15	Jul 25, 1925	22 years, 166 days	The Ring, Blackfriars Road, Southwark, London, England, UK	
77	Win	53–17–6 (1)	Leon Randol	PTS	15	Jul 16, 1925	22 years, 157 days	The Ring, Blackfriars Road, Southwark, London, England, UK	
76	Win	52–17–6 (1)	Harry Reeve	KO	3 (15)	Jul 11, 1925	22 years, 152 days	Stradey Park, Llanelli, England, UK	
75	Win	51–17–6 (1)	Arthur Townley	PTS	15	May 28, 1925	22 years, 108 days	Liverpool Stadium, Pudsey Street, Liverpool, Merseyside, England, UK	
74	Win	50–17–6 (1)	Sergeant Sid Pape	RTD	7 (15)	May 25, 1925	22 years, 105 days	Festival Concert Rooms, York, England, UK	
73	Win	49–17–6 (1)	Jean Leroi	PTS	15	May 9, 1925	22 years, 89 days	The Ring, Blackfriars Road, Southwark, London, England, UK	
72	Win	48–17–6 (1)	Frank Fowler	PTS	15	Apr 27, 1925	22 years, 77 days	Festival Concert Rooms, York, England, UK	
71	Draw	47–17–6 (1)	Dave Magill	PTS	15	Apr 14, 1925	22 years, 64 days	St. George's Market, Belfast, North Ireland, UK	
70	Loss	47–17–5 (1)	Jack Stanley	PTS	15	Mar 21, 1925	22 years, 40 days	The Ring, Blackfriars Road, Southwark, London, England, UK	
69	Win	47–16–5 (1)	Dave Magill	PTS	15	Feb 22, 1925	22 years, 13 days	Premierland, Whitechapel, London, England, UK	
68	Win	46–16–5 (1)	Frank Fowler	PTS	15	Jan 25, 1925	21 years, 351 days	National Sporting Club, Leeds, Yorkshire, England, UK	
67	Loss	45–16–5 (1)	Frank Fowler	PTS	15	Dec 26, 1924	21 years, 321 days	National Sporting Club, Leeds, Yorkshire, England, UK	
66	Win	45–15–5 (1)	George Hetherington	PTS	15	Nov 22, 1924	21 years, 287 days	Holmeside Stadium, Sunderland, Tyne and Wear, England, UK	
65	Win	44–15–5 (1)	Joe Mullings	PTS	15	Nov 14, 1924	21 years, 279 days	Cosmopolitan Gymnasium, Plymouth, Devon, England, UK	
64	Win	43–15–5 (1)	Phil Scott	PTS	15	Oct 27, 1924	21 years, 261 days	Liverpool Stadium, Pudsey Street, Liverpool, Merseyside, England, UK	
63	Win	42–15–5 (1)	Kid Moose	PTS	15	Oct 9, 1924	21 years, 243 days	Liverpool Stadium, Pudsey Street, Liverpool, Merseyside, England, UK	
62	Win	41–15–5 (1)	Corporal Billy Nash	TKO	3 (15)	Aug 4, 1924	21 years, 177 days	United Services Club, Mumbles, Wales, UK	
61	Win	40–15–5 (1)	Harry Gold	TKO	10 (15)	Jun 14, 1924	21 years, 126 days	Working Mans Club, Ynyshir, Wales, UK	
60	Win	39–15–5 (1)	Stanley Glen	PTS	15	May 31, 1924	21 years, 112 days	Holmeside Stadium, Sunderland, Tyne and Wear, England, UK	
59	Loss	38–15–5 (1)	Tom Berry	PTS	15	Mar 6, 1924	21 years, 26 days	Victoria Baths, Nottingham, Nottinghamshire, England, UK	
58	Loss	38–14–5 (1)	Phil Scott	PTS	15	Dec 31, 1923	20 years, 325 days	Hoxton Baths, Hoxton, London, England, UK	
57	Loss	38–13–5 (1)	Tom Berry	PTS	15	Dec 17, 1923	20 years, 311 days	St. James Hall, Newcastle, Tyne and Wear, England, UK	
56	Win	38–12–5 (1)	Guardsman Charlie Penwill	KO	4 (15)	Dec 10, 1923	20 years, 304 days	Ritz Hall, Cadoxton, Barry, Wales, UK	
55	Win	37–12–5 (1)	Guardsman Charlie Penwill	PTS	10	Oct 1, 1923	20 years, 234 days	Olympia, Kensington, London, England, UK	
54	Win	36–12–5 (1)	Albert 'Kid' Lloyd	PTS	20	Sep 3, 1923	20 years, 206 days	The Ring, Blackfriars Road, Southwark, London, England, UK	
53	Win	35–12–5 (1)	Fred Davies	PTS	20	Jul 21, 1923	20 years, 162 days	Stebonheath Park, Llanelli, Wales, UK	
52	Win	34–12–5 (1)	Arthur Townley	TKO	7 (15)	Jul 12, 1923	20 years, 153 days	Liverpool Stadium, Pudsey Street, Liverpool, Merseyside, England, UK	
51	Loss	33–12–5 (1)	Frank Moody	PTS	15	Jul 3, 1923	20 years, 144 days	Lyceum Theatre, Newport, Wales, UK	
50	Win	33–11–5 (1)	Billy Cook	RTD	7 (10)	Apr 28, 1923	20 years, 78 days	The Ring, Blackfriars Road, Southwark, London, England, UK	
49	Win	32–11–5 (1)	Wolf Larsen	PTS	10	Mar 6, 1923	20 years, 25 days	Pioneer Sporting Club, New York City, New York, US	
48	Win	31–11–5 (1)	Fred Clarke	TKO	4 (6)	Feb 21, 1923	20 years, 12 days	Madison Square Garden, New York City, New York, US	
47	Loss	30–11–5 (1)	Charley McKenna	PTS	12	Jan 29, 1923	19 years, 354 days	Harlem-Fairmont AC, New York City, New York, US	
46	Win	30–10–5 (1)	Charley McKenna	PTS	10	Dec 19, 1922	19 years, 313 days	Pioneer Sporting Club, New York City, New York, US	
45	Win	29–10–5 (1)	Wally Stripp	TKO	4 (10)	Dec 5, 1922	19 years, 299 days	Pioneer Sporting Club, New York City, New York, US	
44	Win	28–10–5 (1)	Stewart Bell	PTS	4	Nov 27, 1922	19 years, 291 days	Madison Square Garden, New York City, New York, US	
43	Win	27–10–5 (1)	Jack Douglas	PTS	8	Nov 21, 1922	19 years, 285 days	Pioneer Sporting Club, New York City, New York, US	
42	Loss	26–10–5 (1)	Dave Magill	PTS	20	Sep 18, 1922	19 years, 221 days	Liverpool Stadium, Pudsey Street, Liverpool, Merseyside, England, UK	
41	Loss	26–9–5 (1)	Jerry Shea	PTS	20	Aug 28, 1922	19 years, 200 days	Somerton Park, Newport, Merseyside, England, UK	
40	Win	26–8–5 (1)	Johnny Bee	PTS	15	Jul 13, 1922	19 years, 154 days	Liverpool Stadium, Pudsey Street, Liverpool, Merseyside, England, UK	
39	Win	25–8–5 (1)	Harry Drake	PTS	15	Jun 10, 1922	19 years, 121 days	The Ring, Blackfriars Road, Southwark, London, England, UK	
38	Draw	24–8–5 (1)	Pierre Nicolas	PTS	15	May 13, 1922	19 years, 93 days	The Ring, Blackfriars Road, Southwark, London, England, UK	
37	Loss	24–8–4 (1)	Douglas Warner	TKO	14 (15)	Apr 8, 1922	19 years, 58 days	The Ring, Blackfriars Road, Southwark, London, England, UK	
36	Win	24–7–4 (1)	Trevor Llewellyn	PTS	15	Apr 1, 1922	19 years, 51 days	Stow Hill Drill Hall, Newport, Wales, UK	
35	Win	23–7–4 (1)	Ernie Millson	PTS	20	Mar 23, 1922	19 years, 42 days	The Ring, Blackfriars Road, Southwark, London, England, UK	
34	Win	22–7–4 (1)	Albert Rogers	PTS	10	Mar 9, 1922	19 years, 28 days	The Ring, Blackfriars Road, Southwark, London, England, UK	
33	Win	21–7–4 (1)	Douglas Warner	PTS	10	Mar 2, 1922	19 years, 21 days	The Ring, Blackfriars Road, Southwark, London, England, UK	
32	Win	20–7–4 (1)	Tom Norris	KO	3 (15)	Feb 18, 1922	19 years, 9 days	Drill Hall, Cardiff, London, England, UK	
31	Win	19–7–4 (1)	Harry Ashdown	KO	1 (6)	Feb 16, 1922	19 years, 7 days	The Ring, Blackfriars Road, Southwark, London, England, UK	
30	Win	18–7–4 (1)	Tom Plant	PTS	6	Feb 9, 1922	19 years, 0 days	The Ring, Blackfriars Road, Southwark, London, England, UK	
29	Win	17–7–4 (1)	Len Collett	TKO	2 (15)	Jan 30, 1922	18 years, 355 days	National Sporting Club, Covent Garden, London, England, UK	
28	Loss	16–7–4 (1)	Guardsman George West	TKO	8 (15)	Dec 19, 1921	18 years, 313 days	The Ring, Blackfriars Road, Southwark, London, England, UK	
27	Win	16–6–4 (1)	Jack Hart	PTS	15	Dec 6, 1921	18 years, 300 days	National Sporting Club, Covent Garden, London, England, UK	
26	Loss	15–6–4 (1)	Douglas Warner	PTS	6	Nov 17, 1921	18 years, 281 days	The Ring, Blackfriars Road, Southwark, London, England, UK	
25	Win	15–5–4 (1)	Guardsman George West	PTS	15	Nov 3, 1921	18 years, 267 days	The Ring, Blackfriars Road, Southwark, London, England, UK	
24	Loss	14–5–4 (1)	Fred Newberry	PTS	15	Oct 14, 1921	18 years, 247 days	Cosmopolitan Gymnasium, Plymouth, Devon, England, UK	
23	Win	14–4–4 (1)	Mose Davies	KO	12 (15)	Sep 12, 1921	18 years, 215 days	Llwynypia Baths, Llwynypia, Wales, UK	
22	Win	13–4–4 (1)	Charlie Kemp	PTS	15	Sep 1, 1921	18 years, 204 days	Liverpool Stadium, Pudsey Street, Liverpool, Merseyside, England, UK	
21	Loss	12–4–4 (1)	Ted Moore	RTD	9 (15)	Aug 19, 1921	18 years, 191 days	Cosmopolitan Gymnasium, Plymouth, Devon, England, UK	
20	Win	12–3–4 (1)	Private Billy Cattell	TKO	5 (15)	Jun 30, 1921	18 years, 141 days	Liverpool Stadium, Pudsey Street, Liverpool, Merseyside, England, UK	
19	Loss	11–3–4 (1)	Gunner Eddie Feathers	PTS	15	Apr 5, 1921	18 years, 55 days	Free Trade Hall, Manchester, Lancashire, England, UK	
18	Win	11–2–4 (1)	Ivor Powell	TKO	5 (15)	Apr 2, 1921	18 years, 52 days	Drill Hall, Pontypool, Wales, UK	
17	Loss	10–2–4 (1)	Rene De Vos	PTS	20	Feb 24, 1921	18 years, 15 days	The Ring, Blackfriars Road, Southwark, London, England, UK	
16	Win	10–1–4 (1)	Joe Davis	PTS	10	Nov 20, 1920	17 years, 285 days	Royal Albert Hall, Kensington, London, England, UK	
15	Win	9–1–4 (1)	Harry Franks	PTS	15	Nov 15, 1920	17 years, 280 days	Clapton Greyhound Track, Clapton, London, England, UK	
14	Win	8–1–4 (1)	Bill Johnson	KO	3 (10)	Oct 30, 1920	17 years, 264 days	Dreamland Ballroom, Margate, Kent, England, UK	
13	Win	7–1–4 (1)	Pat Smith	PTS	10	Oct 23, 1920	17 years, 257 days	Grand Pier Pavilion, Herne Bay, Wales, UK	
12	Win	6–1–4 (1)	Fred Smith	PTS	10	Oct 16, 1920	17 years, 250 days	Dreamland Ballroom, Margate, Kent, England, UK	
11	Loss	5–1–4 (1)	Jack Davies	PTS	10	Oct 7, 1920	17 years, 241 days	Grand Pier Pavilion, Herne Bay, Kent, England, UK	
10	Draw	5–0–4 (1)	Jim Davies	PTS	15	Sep 25, 1920	17 years, 229 days	Halfway Park, Llanelli, Wales, UK	
9	Draw	5–0–3 (1)	Harry Higgins	PTS	15	Aug 28, 1920	17 years, 201 days	Athletic Club, Blaenavon, Wales, UK	
8	Win	5–0–2 (1)	Evan Llewellyn	PTS	8	Apr 17, 1920	17 years, 68 days	Town Hall, Maesteg, Wales, UK	
7	Win	4–0–2 (1)	Bryn Jenkins	PTS	15	Apr 3, 1920	17 years, 54 days	Princes Theatre, Ystrad Mynach, Wales, UK	
6	Win	3–0–2 (1)	Jack Terrett	RTD	7 (10)	Feb 28, 1920	17 years, 19 days	Town Hall, Maesteg, Wales, UK	
5	Win	2–0–2 (1)	Young W. Amesbury	KO	2 (15)	Jan 31, 1920	16 years, 356 days	Drill Hall, Pentre, Wales, UK	
4	Draw	1–0–2 (1)	Jack Higgins	PTS	10	Jan 24, 1920	16 years, 349 days	Town Hall, Maesteg, Wales, UK	
3	Win	1–0–1 (1)	Dai Jones	PTS	10	Aug 30, 1919	16 years, 202 days	Llanelli, Wales, UK	
2	ND	0–0–1 (1)	Jack Jones	ND	4	Aug 25, 1919	16 years, 197 days	Market Hall, Llanelli, Wales, UK	
1	Draw	0–0–1	Frank Evans	PTS	15	Jul 12, 1919	16 years, 153 days	Llanelli, Wales, UK	

== See also ==
- List of British light-heavyweight boxing champions

== Bibliography ==
- Lee, Tony (2009). All in My Corner: A tribute to some forgotten Welsh boxing heroes. Ammanford: TL Associates. ISBN 978-0-9564456-0-5.
