= Professional boxing record of Len Johnson =

Below is the professional boxing record of Len Johnson.

135 fights	96 wins	32 losses
By knockout	37	5
By decision	57	25
By disqualification	2	2
Draws	7	

No.	Result	Record	Opponent	Type	Round, time	Date	Location	Notes
135	Loss	96–32–7	Jim Winters	PTS	12	12 Oct 1933	Music Hall, Edinburgh, Scotland	
134	Loss	96–31–7	Eddie Peirce	TKO	11 (12)	1 Oct 1933	The Ring, London, England	
133	Win	96–30–7	Jack London	PTS	12	31 Aug 1933	Liverpool Stadium, Liverpool, England	
132	Win	95–30–7	Arthur Vermaut	KO	1 (12)	26 Jun 1933	Royal Albert Hall, London, England	
131	Win	94–30–7	Kid Scott	RTD	3 (8)	29 May 1933	Royal Albert Hall, London, England	
130	Loss	93–30–7	Kid Scott	PTS	15	20 May 1933	Hyde Park, Sheffield, England	
129	Loss	93–29–7	Marcel Thil	RTD	8 (10)	31 Oct 1932	Palais des Sports, Paris, France	
128	Loss	93–28–7	Len Harvey	PTS	15	11 May 1932	Royal Albert Hall, London, England	For British middleweight title; The bout was not recognised by the BBBofC due to the colour bar
127	Win	93–27–7	Arthur Vermaut	RTD	1 (15)	27 Apr 1932	Royal Albert Hall, London, England	
126	Win	92–27–7	Lode Wuestenraedt	KO	3 (12)	14 Mar 1932	Leeds Town Hall, Leeds, England	
125	Win	91–27–7	Steve McCall	RTD	4 (12)	1 Mar 1932	Music Hall, Edinburgh, Scotland	
124	Win	90–27–7	Adolf Pott	PTS	8	28 Jan 1932	Royal Albert Hall, London, England	
123	Win	89–27–7	Jack Etienne	PTS	15	20 Apr 1931	King's Hall, Manchester, England	
122	Loss	88–27–7	Jack Etienne	PTS	15	6 Apr 1931	King's Hall, Manchester, England	
121	Draw	88–26–7	Harry Crossley	PTS	15	17 Nov 1930	Free Trade Hall, Manchester, England	
120	Win	88–26–6	Giuseppe Malerba	TKO	7 (15)	21 Oct 1930	Free Trade Hall, Manchester, England	
119	Win	87–26–6	Pierre Gandon	PTS	15	13 Oct 1930	The Ring, London, England	
118	Win	86–26–6	Leone Jacovacci	RTD	7 (15)	17 Jun 1930	St James Hall, Newcastle, England	
117	Win	85–26–6	Bob Carvill	PTS	15	12 Jun 1930	Liverpool Stadium, Liverpool, England	
116	Win	84–26–6	Michele Bonaglia	PTS	15	17 Dec 1929	King's Hall, Manchester, England	
115	Win	83–26–6	Pierre Gandon	PTS	15	26 Nov 1929	Free Trade Hall, Manchester, England	
114	Win	82–26–6	Lode Wuestenraedt	RTD	3 (15)	4 Nov 1929	Granby Halls, Leicester, England	
113	Win	81–26–6	Emile Egrel	TKO	7 (15)	20 Oct 1929	The Rink, West Bromwich, England	
112	Win	80–26–6	Marcel Moret	TKO	4 (8)	21 Jun 1929	Clapton Stadium, London, England	
111	Win	79–26–6	Harry Crossley	PTS	15	3 Jun 1929	Fenton Street Drill Hall, Leeds, England	Won inaugural Northern Area light-heavyweight title
110	Win	78–26–6	Gerard Debarbieux	RTD	9 (15)	11 Apr 1929	Liverpool Stadium, Liverpool, England	
109	Win	77–26–6	Sunny Jim Williams	PTS	15	22 Jan 1929	King's Hall, Manchester, England	
108	Win	76–26–6	Ignacio Ara	PTS	15	31 Dec 1928	The Ring, London, England	
107	Win	75–26–6	Leone Jacovacci	PTS	15	20 Nov 1928	Exhibition Hall, Manchester, England	
106	Win	74–26–6	George Schladenhaufen	RTD	5 (15)	23 Oct 1928	Free Trade Hall, Manchester, England	
105	Win	73–26–6	Ted Moore	PTS	15	19 Mar 1928	The Ring, London, England	
104	Win	72–26–6	George Hetherington	RTD	8 (10)	10 Mar 1928	Pavilion, Consett, England	
103	Win	71–26–6	Frank Fowler	RTD	9 (15)	1 Mar 1928	Leeds Town Hall, Leeds, England	
102	Loss	70–26–6	Jack Hood	PTS	15	13 Feb 1928	The Ring, London, England	
101	Win	70–25–6	Gipsy Daniels	PTS	15	23 Jan 1928	The Ring, London, England	
100	Win	69–25–6	Piet Brand	RTD	10 (15)	1 Jan 1928	The Ring, London, England	
99	Win	68–25–6	Jack Etienne	PTS	15	19 Dec 1927	The Ring, London, England	
98	Win	67–25–6	Jack Elliott	PTS	15	25 Jul 1927	The Ring, London, England	
97	Win	66–25–6	Ted Moore	PTS	15	9 Jun 1927	Olympia London, London, England	
96	Loss	65–25–6	Leone Jacovacci	PTS	12	22 May 1927	Velodromo Sempione, Milan, Italy	
95	Win	65–24–6	Horace Jackson	KO	4 (15)	17 May 1927	Drill Hall, Middlesbrough, England	
94	Win	64–24–6	Guardsman George West	PTS	15	31 Jan 1927	Hippodrome, Cardiff, Wales	
93	Win	63–24–6	Len Harvey	PTS	20	3 Jan 1927	The Ring, London, England	
92	Loss	62–24–6	Jack Etienne	DQ	5 (15)	6 Dec 1926	The Ring, London, England	
91	Win	62–23–6	Maurice Prunier	PTS	15	15 Nov 1926	The Ring, London, England	
90	Win	61–23–6	Guardsman George West	PTS	20	1 Nov 1926	King's Hall, Manchester, England	
89	Win	60–23–6	Guardsman George West	PTS	20	10 Sep 1926	King's Hall, Manchester, England	
88	Win	59–23–6	Frisco McGale	PTS	20	5 Jun 1926	Brisbane Stadium, Brisbane, Australia	
87	Loss	58–23–6	Sunny Jim Williams	PTS	20	29 May 1926	Brisbane Stadium, Brisbane, Australia	
86	Win	58–22–6	Tiger Jack Payne	PTS	20	15 May 1926	Sydney Stadium, Sydney, Australia	
85	Win	57–22–6	Tommy Uren	KO	11 (20)	8 May 1926	Sydney Stadium, Sydney, Australia	Retained Commonwealth middleweight title
84	Win	56–22–6	Alf Stewart	KO	19 (20), 2:50	14 Apr 1926	West Melbourne Stadium, Melbourne, Australia	Retained Commonwealth middleweight title
83	Loss	55–22–6	Sunny Jim Williams	PTS	20	20 Mar 1926	Sydney Stadium, Sydney, Australia	
82	Win	55–21–6	Tiger Jack Payne	PTS	20	6 Mar 1926	Sydney Stadium, Sydney, Australia	
81	Win	54–21–6	Harry Collins	PTS	20	20 Feb 1926	Sydney Stadium, Sydney, Australia	Won vacant Commonwealth middleweight title; As recognised in Australia, but not by the NSC or authorities in Britain
80	Loss	53–21–6	Jack Hood	PTS	20	7 Dec 1925	The Ring, London, England	
79	Win	53–20–6	Ted Kid Lewis	RTD	10 (15)	27 Nov 1925	King's Hall, Manchester, England	
78	Win	52–20–6	Georges Rouquet	PTS	15	9 Nov 1925	The Ring, London, England	
77	Win	51–20–6	Roland Todd	PTS	15	25 Sep 1925	King's Hall, Manchester, England	
76	Win	50–20–6	Frank Briscot	PTS	15	31 Aug 1925	The Ring, London, England	
75	Win	49–20–6	Charlie Ring	PTS	15	23 Jul 1925	Premierland, London, England	
74	Win	48–20–6	Herman van 't Hof	PTS	20	15 Jun 1925	The Ring, London, England	
73	Win	47–20–6	Ernest Tyncke	PTS	15	14 May 1925	Premierland, London, England	
72	Win	46–20–6	Albert Rogers	KO	2 (15)	26 Apr 1925	Premierland, London, England	
71	Draw	45–20–6	Fred Davies	PTS	15	24 Apr 1925	Southampton Coliseum, Southampton, England	
70	Win	45–20–5	Joe Bloomfield	PTS	15	12 Apr 1925	Premierland, London, England	
69	Win	44–20–5	Billy Pritchard	KO	13 (20)	6 Apr 1925	Hulme Town Hall, Manchester, England	Won inaugural Northern Area middleweight title
68	Draw	43–20–5	Billy Farmer	PTS	15	30 Mar 1925	Edmund Road Drill Hall, Sheffield, England	
67	Win	43–20–4	Roland Todd	PTS	20	23 Feb 1925	King's Hall, Manchester, England	
66	Win	42–20–4	Charlie Ring	PTS	15	8 Feb 1925	Premierland, London, England	
65	Win	41–20–4	Ernie Millson	RTD	5 (15)	26 Jan 1925	Drill Hall, London, England	
64	Loss	40–20–4	Billy Cook	DQ	7 (15)	26 Dec 1924	National Sporting Club, Leeds, England	Johnson disqualified for accidental low blow
63	Win	40–19–4	Johnny Bee	PTS	15	22 Dec 1924	Southport Winter Gardens, Southport, England	
62	Win	39–19–4	Pat McAllister	TKO	9 (15)	1 Dec 1924	Hulme Town Hall, Manchester, England	
61	Win	38–19–4	Pat Logue	DQ	3 (15)	15 Nov 1924	Holmeside Stadium, Sunderland, England	Logue disqualified for repeated low blows
60	Win	37–19–4	Tommy Moran	KO	4 (15)	11 Nov 1924	Free Trade Hall, Manchester, England	
59	Win	36–19–4	Ted Coveney	PTS	15	1 Nov 1924	Holmeside Stadium, Sunderland, England	
58	Loss	35–19–4	Frank Fowler	PTS	12	29 Sep 1924	Festival Concert Rooms, York, England	
57	Loss	35–18–4	Piet Hobin	PTS	12	19 Aug 1924	Rubenspaleis, Antwerp, Belgium	
56	Draw	35–17–4	Frank Burns	PTS	15	7 Aug 1924	Premierland, London, England	
55	Loss	35–17–3	'Hamilton' Johnny Brown	RTD	3 (15), 3:00	14 Jul 1924	Scottish Stadium, Glasgow, Scotland	
54	Loss	35–16–3	Herman van 't Hof	PTS	15	26 Jun 1924	Premierland, London, England	Incorrectly recorded as 28 June 1924 (Note: On 26 June 1924, The Sportsman provided an accurate account of the date of Johnson's second encounter with van 't Hof, which took place on 26 June, thereby correcting BoxRec's recording-error.)
53	Win	35–15–3	Jack Phoenix	PTS	15	21 Jun 1924	Croke Park, Dublin, Ireland	
52	Loss	34–15–3	Billy Mack	PTS	15	12 Jun 1924	Liverpool Stadium, Liverpool, England	
51	Win	34–14–3	Ted Coveney	PTS	15	11 May 1924	National Sporting Club, Leeds, England	
50	Win	33–14–3	Ernest Tyncke	PTS	15	24 Apr 1924	Premierland, London, England	
49	Win	32–14–3	Pat McAllister	TKO	11 (15)	30 Mar 1924	Premier Boxing Academy, Leeds, England	
48	Win	31–14–3	Bert Brown	KO	4 (15)	24 Mar 1924	Cossington Street Baths, Leicester, England	Incorrectly labelled a second-round knockout by Johnson (Note: On 25 March 1924, Nottingham Journal provided an accurate account of the concluding result of the fight, by way of Johnson's fourth-round knockout of Brown, thereby correcting BoxRec's record of it being in the second-round.)
47	Win	30–14–3	Joe Bloomfield	PTS	15	20 Mar 1924	Premierland, London, England	
46	Win	29–14–3	Lonz Webster	PTS	15	10 Mar 1924	Festival Concert Rooms, York, England	
45	Win	28–14–3	Charlie Woodman	TKO	8 (15)	3 Mar 1924	King's Hall, Manchester, England	
44	Win	27–14–3	Jimmy McDonald	RTD	12 (15)	17 Feb 1924	Premier Boxing Academy, Leeds, England	
43	Loss	26–14–3	Billy Farmer	PTS	15	11 Feb 1924	Victoria Baths, Nottingham, England	
42	Loss	26–13–3	Kid Moose	PTS	15	7 Feb 1924	Liverpool Stadium, Liverpool, England	
41	Loss	26–12–3	Billy Pritchard	PTS	15	29 Jan 1924	Free Trade Hall, Manchester, England	
40	Win	26–11–3	Jim Slater	PTS	15	14 Jan 1924	Cossington Street Baths, Leicester, England	
39	Loss	25–11–3	Herman van 't Hof	RTD	8 (15), 3:00	12 Jan 1924	The Ring, London, England	
38	Win	25–10–3	Kid Moose	PTS	15	7 Jan 1924	Olympia, Middlesbrough, Scotland	
37	Win	24–10–3	Harry Lem	RTD	8 (15)	31 Dec 1923	Victoria Baths, Nottingham, England	A new bout discovery: Johnson v Lem (Note: On 12 January 1924, Jerry Walker of The Stapleford & Sandiacre News provided an accurate account of bout between Johnson and Lem occurring in Nottingham on a Monday; thereby suggesting the fight being on 31 December 1923, as according to BoxRec; as the Walker included mention of the December flyweight encounter between Tiny Smith and Bert Fletcher also occurred on the Johnson undercard.)
36	Win	23–10–3	Albert Brown	RTD	6 (15)	28 Dec 1923	Scottish Stadium, Glasgow, Scotland	
35	Win	22–10–3	Bill Bates	PTS	15	22 Dec 1923	Holmeside Stadium, Sunderland, England	
34	Loss	21–10–3	Johnny Bee	PTS	15	17 Dec 1923	The Ring, London, England	
33	Win	21–9–3	Tom Plant	RTD	11 (15)	10 Nov 1923	Holmeside Stadium, Sunderland, England	
32	Win	20–9–3	Lonz Webster	PTS	15	6 Nov 1923	Market Hall, East Kirkby, England	
31	Win	19–9–3	Johnny Bee	PTS	15	2 Nov 1923	Scottish Stadium, Glasgow, Scotland	
30	Win	18–9–3	Ernie McCabe	PTS	15	9 Oct 1923	Free Trade Hall, Manchester, England	
29	Draw	17–9–3	Pat McAllister	PTS	15	3 Sep 1923	Croke Park, Dublin, Ireland	
28	Win	17–9–2	Bobby Lees	PTS	15	25 Aug 1923	Nelson Recreation Ground, Glasgow, Scotland	
27	Win	16–9–2	Percy Calladine	KO	3 (15)	4 Aug 1923	Holmeside Stadium, Sunderland, England	
26	Loss	15–9–2	Kid Moose	PTS	15	30 Jul 1923	Holmeside Stadium, Sunderland, England	
25	Win	15–8–2	Jimmy Cox	PTS	15	6 Jul 1923	Scottish Stadium, Glasgow, Scotland	
24	Loss	14–8–2	Kid Moose	PTS	15	30 Jun 1923	Holmeside Stadium, Sunderland, England	
23	Win	14–7–2	Ned Dixon	PTS	15	9 Jun 1923	Fairground, Porth, Wales	
22	Win	13–7–2	Lonz Webster	PTS	15	25 May 1923	Scottish Stadium, Glasgow, Scotland	
21	Draw	12–7–2	Billy Pritchard	PTS	15	23 Apr 1923	Festival Concert Rooms, York, England	
20	Win	12–7–1	Billy Pritchard	PTS	15	26 Mar 1923	Victoria Baths, Nottingham, England	
19	Win	11–7–1	Billy Pritchard	PTS	15	12 Mar 1923	National Athletic Club, Glasgow, Scotland	
18	Draw	10–7–1	Billy Pritchard	PTS	15	26 Feb 1923	Victoria Baths, Nottingham, England	
17	Win	10–7	Lonz Webster	PTS	15	9 Feb 1923	Paragon Picture House, Manchester, England	
16	Loss	9–7	Charlie Smith	PTS	15	29 Jan 1923	Festival Concert Rooms, York, England	
15	Win	9–6	Horace Jackson	KO	4 (15)	18 Dec 1922	Drill Hall, Middlesbrough, England	
14	Loss	8–6	Frithjof Hansen	PTS	15	6 Dec 1922	Copenhagen, Denmark	
13	Win	8–5	Pat McAllister	PTS	15	21 Nov 1922	National Athletic Club, Glasgow, Scotland	
12	Loss	7–5	Billy Pritchard	PTS	15	24 Oct 1922	Free Trade Hall, Manchester, England	
11	Win	7–4	Kid Moose	PTS	10	14 Oct 1922	Southport Winter Gardens, Southport, England	
10	Win	6–4	Mick Bradley	PTS	15	15 Sep 1922	Whitworth Hall, Manchester, England	
9	Loss	5–4	Billy Pritchard	PTS	15	18 Apr 1922	Free Trade Hall, Manchester, England	
8	Win	5–3	Nat Sweatenham	TKO	2 (10)	28 Mar 1922	Free Trade Hall, Manchester, England	
7	Win	4–3	Mick Bradley	DQ	5 (15)	28 Feb 1922	Free Trade Hall, Manchester, England	
6	Win	3–3	Eddie Pearson	TKO	2 (10)	31 Jan 1922	Free Trade Hall, Manchester, England	
5	Loss	2–3	Jack Royle	PTS	10	14 Jun 1921	St George's Hall, Oldham, England	
4	Win	2–2	Harry Johnson	KO	2 (6)	2 Jan 1921	Stockport, England	
3	Win	1–2	Jerry Hogan	KO	3 (6)	1 Jan 1921	Alhambra Theatre, Manchester, England	
2	Loss	0–2	Young Marshall	TKO	4 (10)	26 Oct 1920	Free Trade Hall, Manchester, England	
1	Loss	0–1	Young Marshall	PTS	10	17 Apr 1920	Alhambra Theatre, Manchester, England	
