= Tom Norris (boxer) =

Wales boxer

Personal information
- Nationality: British
- Born: Clydach Vale, Rhondda, Wales
- Height: 6 ft 2 in (1.88 m)
- Weight: Heavyweight

Boxing career

Boxing record
- Total fights: 14
- Wins: 4
- Win by KO: 9
- Losses: 9
- Draws: 1

Tom Norris was a Welsh professional heavyweight boxer. Born in Clydach Vale in the Rhondda, Norris became the Welsh heavyweight champion in December 1925, losing the title in the rematch to Dick Power some three months later.

== Boxing career ==
Norris's first recorded professional bout was against Wally Buckley at Liverpool Stadium on 2 September 1920. Norris lost the contest in the third round through a disqualification. There are no recorded fights for Norris until February 1922 when he faced fellow Welshman Gipsy Daniels at the Drill Hall in Cardiff. Daniels, a future British heavyweight champion, stopped Norris with a knockout in the third round. Norris fought at least twice more in 1922 and both recorded bouts ended in losses. His first was by points decision against Seaman Powell at Pill Athletic Ground in Newport, then a failed challenge for the Welsh heavyweight title versus Trevor Llewellyn. Although the contest against Llewellyn was scheduled for twenty three-minute rounds, Norris again only lasted to the third round, this time losing by a technical knockout. On 3 May, he was back at the Drill Hall, this time facing and beating Billy Prestage, knocking him out with a right hook. Norris met Llewellyn again on 30 August 1924, though this time not for the title. On this occasion Norris won, when he was given the decision after the match went the full distance. He followed this up with a win three weeks later in Liverpool, knocking out local fighter Ike Ingleton. In November 1924 he met Seaman Powell again, at the Pavilion Theatre in Newport; this time the result was a draw.

On Boxing Day 1925 Norris was given a second challenge at the Welsh heavyweight title, this time against Crumlin's Dick Power. Fought at the Palace Theatre in Power's home town, the fifteen-round contest ended in the eleventh when Norris stopped his opponent via technical knockout, giving Norris the title. Although now the Welsh champion, his reign was short-lived after Power was given a rematch on 5 April the next year. The fight was held at Taff Vale Park in Pontypridd, and a record crowd turned out to see the two fighters challenge for the title and a purse of £150. The twenty-round match went the distance and the referee gave the decision, and with it the Welsh heavyweight title, to Power.

Although there is little recorded evidence of Norris's professional career in the years directly after he lost his Welsh title, in 1928 he travelled to the United States to take on local fighters, mainly in the state of Ohio. In February 2009, the Massillon Evening Independent recorded that Norris had begun his campaign in the States three months earlier, recording eight-straight knockout wins, all under three rounds. Other recorded bouts in America included four fights in Akron, Ohio, in which Norris beat Pat Irish, but lost to Jack Roberts, Ray Young and Tiny Powell.
