= Battling Siki =

Senegalese boxer (1897–1925)

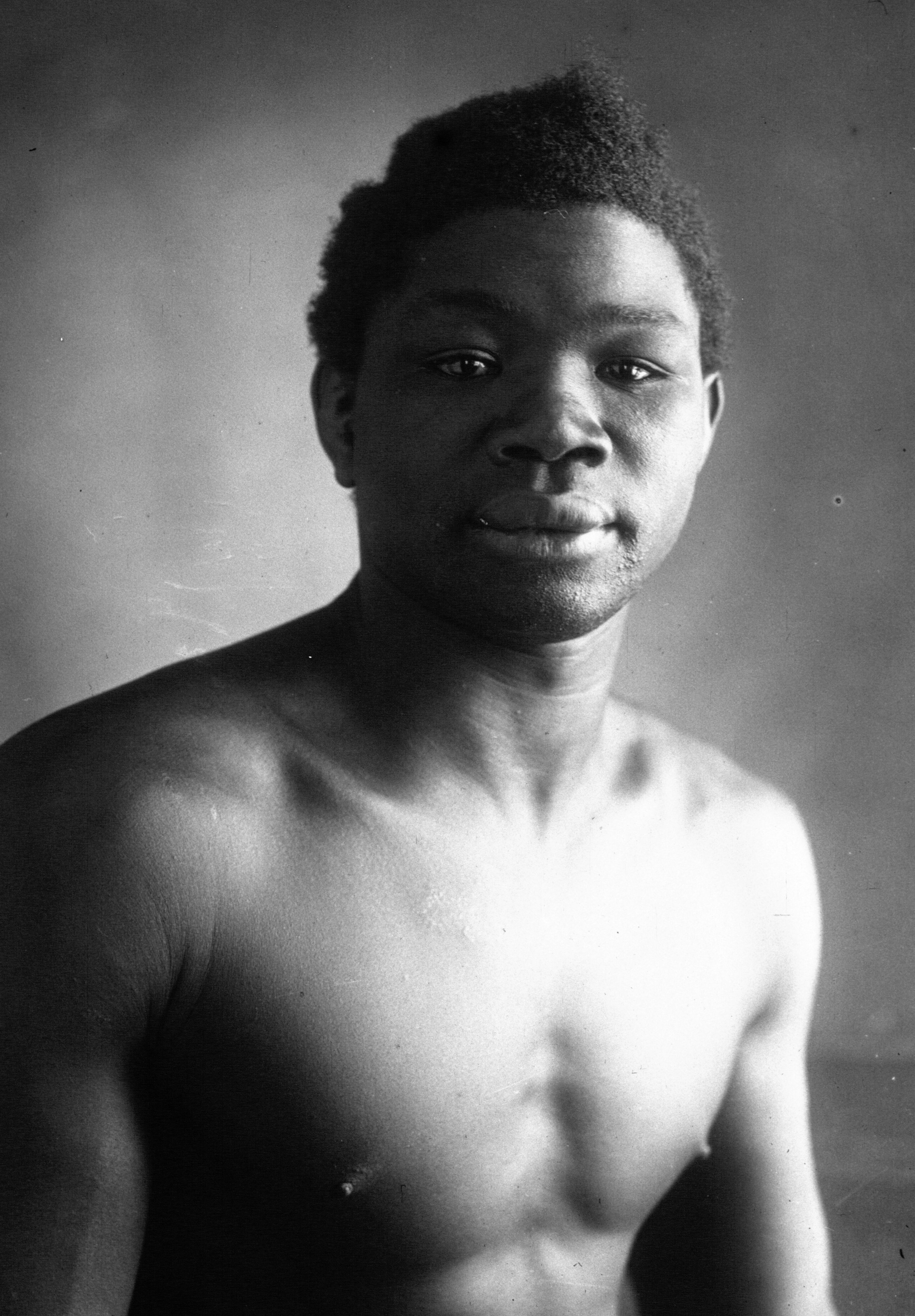
- Battling Siki in 1921
- Born: 16 September 1897; Saint-Louis, French Senegal
- Died: 15 December 1925 (aged 28); New York City, U.S.
- Other name: The Singular Senegalese
- Occupation: Boxer
- Height: 1.79 m (5 ft 10 1/2 in)

Amadou Louis M'barick Fall (16 September 1897 – 15 December 1925), known as Battling Siki, was the first African-born boxing world champion. Born in French-Senegal, he won the world World Light-Heavyweight Championship after knocking out Georges Carpentier in 1922.

== Personal life ==
Born in the port city of Saint-Louis, French Senegal. His father died when he was young. At age 10 he was brought to Europe and abandoned.

Lijntje van Appelteer (1902-1983), a Dutch woman, became his common-law wife. On 16 December 1921, she had a son. In 1923 Siki left France and never returned. In 1924 he married Lillian Werner of Memphis, Tennessee. A rare mixed-race marriage at the time. A scandal both due to race, and because he had abandoned van Appelteer and her child in France.

To the whole world I am a savage. I sometimes let them believe that. But gentlemen, it’s not true.

— Battling Siki,

== Boxing and war ==
He started boxing at age 14. From 1912 to 1914 he compiled a modest record of eight wins, six losses and two draws.

When World War I erupted, Siki joined the French army, serving in the 8th Colonial Infantry Regiment. During the war he was decorated for bravery in battle with the Croix de Guerre and the Médaille Militaire, before being honorably discharged.

After the war Siki compiled the impressive stretch of 44 wins in 47 bouts (22 KOs), suffering just one loss (on a decision) and two draws. He defeated French middleweight champion Ercole de Balzac. No weigh in occurred, so the title was not on the line. Balzac was stripped of the title after defeat. Siki also defeated French heavyweight champion Marcel Nilles, again without the title on the line.

Georges Carpentier was the reigning World Light-Heavyweight Champion and European champion. Carpentier had recently lost to Jack Dempsey in 1921 in a historic fight and returned home to France more popular than before. Carpentier had been billed as a "war hero" to oppose the champion Dempsey, alleged draft dodger.

Both Siki and Carpentier had both won the Croix de Guerre and the Médaille Militaire in World War I. The two met in Paris in September 1922 at the Stade Buffalo. Carpentier was part-owner of this 55,000 seat venue, he promoted the event, and also provided the referee. Siki was knocked down in the first and again in the third. Siki later claimed that he had agreed to take a dive, and that these knockdowns were part of the deal. Either due to Carpentier being too rough, or his taunting, Siki felt the agreement had been broken. In the sixth round Siki hit Carpentier with a powerful right uppercut that put Carpentier down and out for the count. The referee claimed Siki had tripped Carpentier, and awarded the bout to the unconscious Carpentier on a foul. Fearing a riot from the crowd, the three ringside judges overruled the referee, and Siki was eventually declared the champion. The French Boxing Federation, where Carpentier's manager was a boardmember, revoked Siki's boxing license. Though it lacked the authority to strip him of the World title.

Siki was now the first black world champion since Jack Johnson, and the first black fighter to have received a world title shot in that time. Like in Johnson's championship reign, many countries still refused to sanction interracial title fights. Siki had a fight arranged to defend his title against Joe Beckett in London, but this was stopped by Home Secretary William Bridgeman. "In contests between men of color and white men, the temperments of the contestants are not comparable and moreover all sorts of passions are aroused... such contests are considered against the national interests and they tend to arouse passions which it is inadvisbible to stimulate."

With few other options, Siki signed to defend his title against Irish-American light heavyweight Mike McTigue on Saint Patrick's Day in Dublin, despite the ongoing Irish Civil War. Nat Fleischer founder of The Ring, "It is doubtful whether a boxing contest was ever staged under such conditions... Spectators walked to the theater between rows of guards. Armored cars loomed around corners. Machine guns poked their noses from points of vantage." After viewing newsreel footage of the fight in 1979, Robert Cantwell of Sports Illustrated concluded that Siki won more rounds and should have been declared the winner. George Kimball commented: "Under today’s scoring system, Siki might indeed have won more rounds than McTigue, but remember, [referee] Smith wasn’t handing in round-by-round totals, and his overall view was apt to be more shaped by the concluding rounds than those that had taken place more than an hour earlier." McTigue won after 20 rounds to become the new champion.

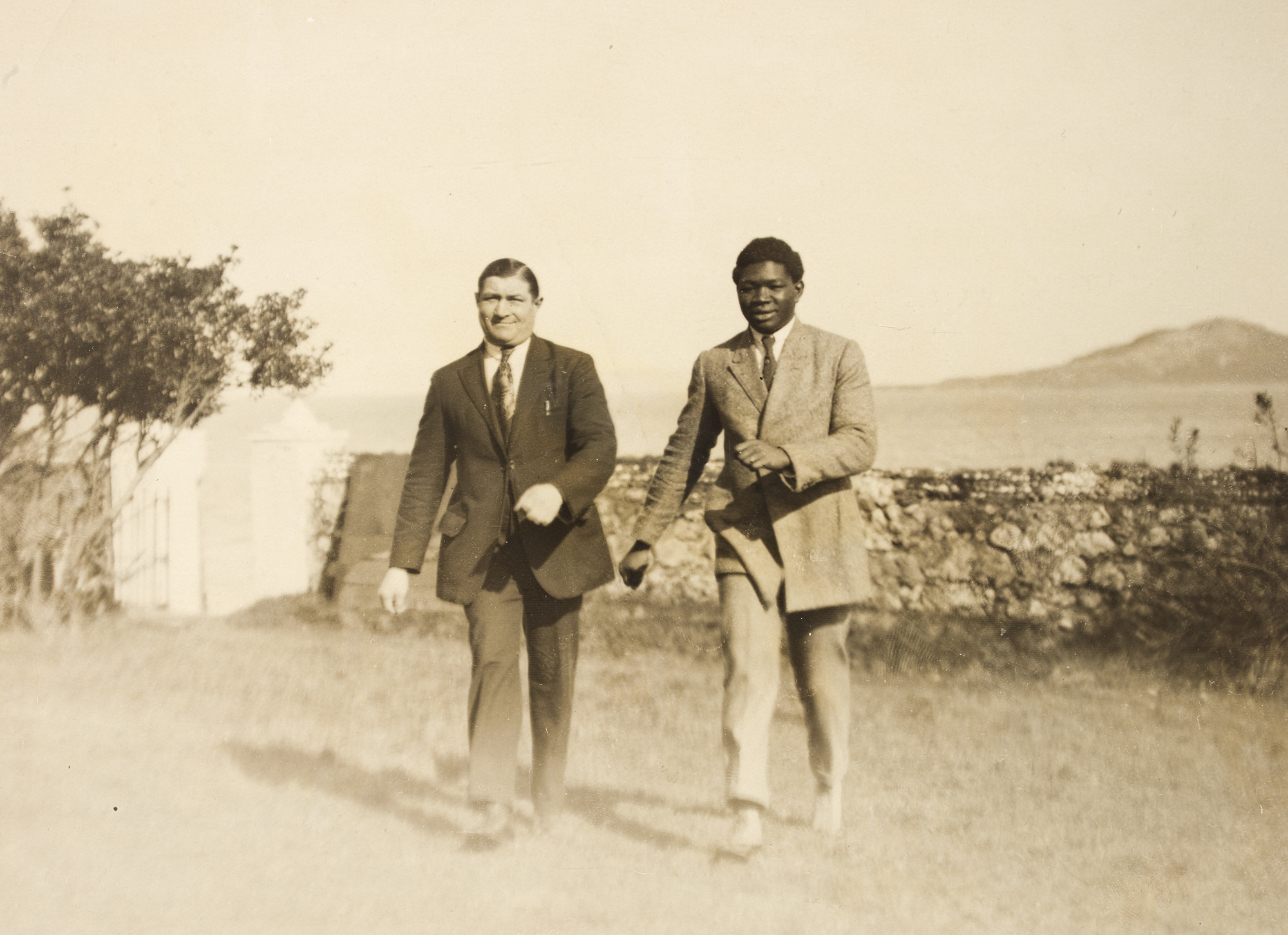
Siki photographed in March 1923 with Eugène Stuber at the Claremont Hotel, Howth, Dublin

== After the world title ==
After losing his title Siki moved to the United States. First fighting and losing to Kid Norfolk in a 15 round decision at Madison Square Garden. His record in the States was poor and his failure to train properly was evident; his record after winning the title was 11 wins (7 KOS), 17 losses, 1 draw and 2 no contests. He either won by KO or lost by decision in nearly every fight.

In 1924 he traveled to Havana, Cuba to fight Santiago Esparraguera. Siki became ill on arrival, and the bout was eventually cancelled. In a separate incident in Cuba, Siki was hit over the head with a glass bowl, needing 6 stitches. He returned to the United States without having a bout in Cuba at all, and broke 5 ribs in a car accident shortly after in Nebraska.

In July 1925 Siki was stabbed and hospitalized days after defeating Jimmy Francis by 2nd round KO. Francis, like many boxers in New York at the time, was connected to mobster Owney Madden. Biographer Steven Benson speculates this was payback for Siki failing to throw the Jimmy Francis fight.

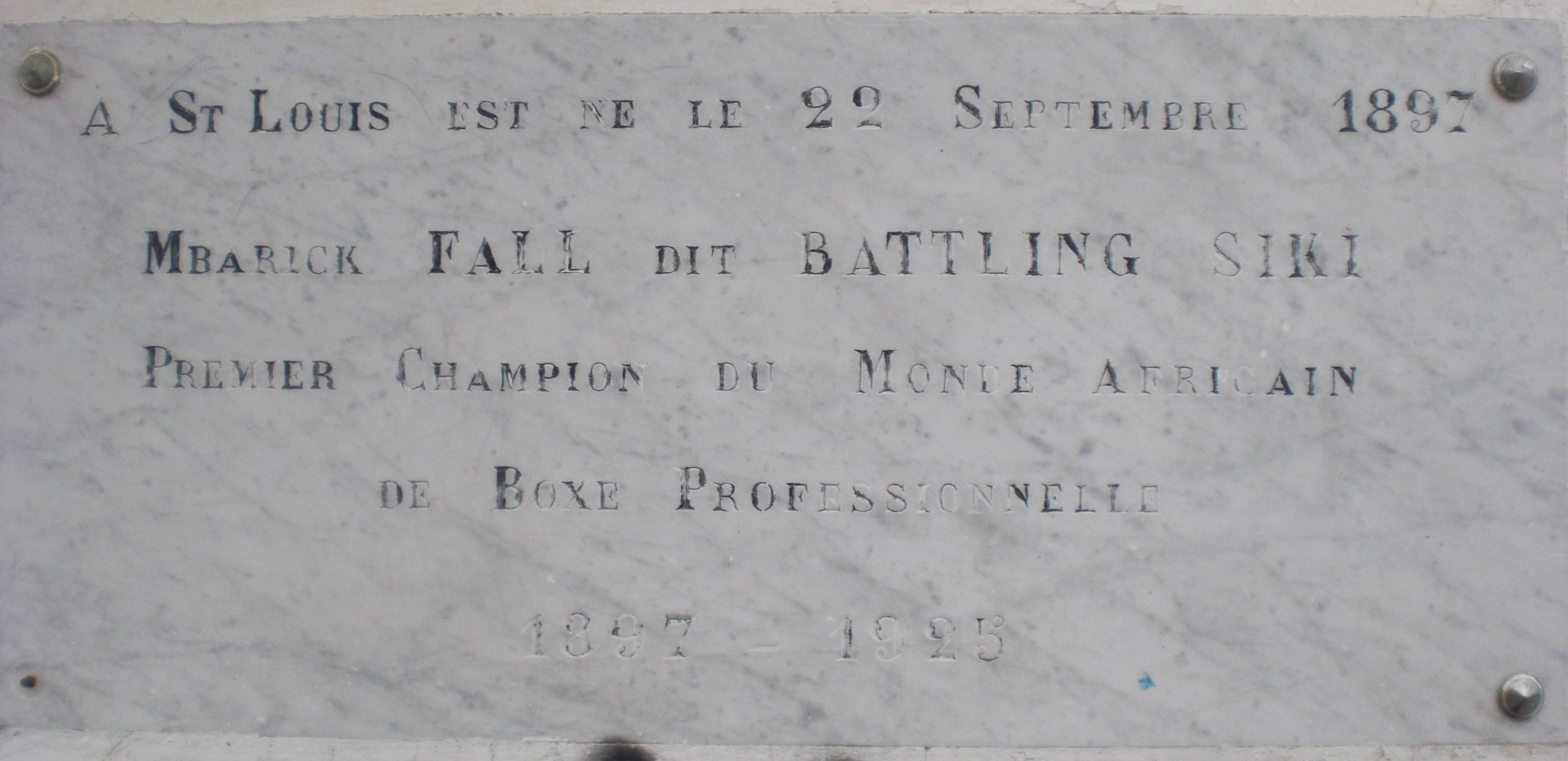
Commemorative plaque in Saint-Louis

In the same month, Siki was arrested after allegedly drawing a knife on a police officer and slashing his uniform. He was charged with felonious assault but was released with a 5 dollar fine, the U.S. Immigration authorities immediately initiated proceedings to deport him following the "affray". Adding to his legal troubles, reports from 1924 and 1925 suggest authorities also targeted him for bigamy, as he had married an American woman in Memphis while reportedly still having a common-law wife in Holland, the scandal triggered a wave of support for his deportation, including from black press outlets who had previously championed him.

== Murder and burial ==
On 15 December 1925, he was stopped by a policeman who saw him drunk on 42nd Street, not far from his apartment, and not far from where he had been stabbed in July. Siki stated that he was on his way home, and walked off. Later he was found lying face down, shot twice in the back at close range, dead at the age of 28. An autopsy revealed that the bullets hit his left lung and kidneys, causing a fatal internal hemorrhage.

The murder remains unsolved. Although one young man was arrested and held for eight months, he was released without trial in 1926 due to a lack of evidence. Speculation regarding the killer includes underworld figures he may have angered, unpaid liquor debts, or a "gangland execution" resulting from his refusal to participate in ring fixes.

The Rev. Adam Clayton Powell, the father of Adam Clayton Powell Jr., presided over his funeral, which was held in Harlem, New York.

He was initially buried at Flushing Cemetery, in an unmarked grave. There were brief ceremonies held in the Flushing Cemetery on 46th Ave and was participated in by representatives of the Senegalese government and of the African Boxing Union: a headstone was dedicated here by the International Veterans Boxing Association. Cherif Djigo, first consul at the Senegalese Mission to the United Nations, stated "This stone represents to us a grand symbol that Battling Siki has not been forgotten". His body was repatriated to Senegal in 1993.

== Legacy ==
In February 2023 the World Boxing Council hosted the Premiere of Ashley Morrison's documentary on Battling Siki's life entitled "Return To Your Corner" at the New York Athletic Club.

Battling Siki vs. Carpentier was viewed by a young Ernest Hemingway. Elements of the fight are present in his short story Fifty Grand.

== Professional boxing record ==
All information in this section is derived from BoxRec, unless otherwise stated.

=== Official record ===
91 fights	60 wins	24 losses
By knockout	31	4
By decision	26	16
By disqualification	3	4
Draws	4	
Newspaper decisions/draws	3	

All newspaper decisions are officially regarded as “no decision” bouts and are not counted in the win/loss/draw column.

No.	Result	Record	Opponent	Type	Round	Date	Location	Notes
91	Loss	60–24–4 (3)	Lee Anderson	PTS	12	Nov 13, 1925	104th Regiment Armory, Baltimore, Maryland, U.S	
90	Loss	60–23–4 (3)	Billy Vidabeck	NWS	10	Aug 18, 1925	Playgrounds Stadium, West New York, New Jersey, U.S	
89	Loss	60–23–4 (2)	Joe Silvani	DQ	8 (12)	Aug 8, 1925	Commonwealth Sporting Club, New York City, New York, U.S	
88	Win	60–22–4 (2)	Jimmy Francis	KO	2 (8)	Jul 23, 1925	Playgrounds Stadium, West New York, New Jersey, U.S	
87	Win	59–22–4 (2)	Chief Halbran	KO	3 (12)	Jul 10, 1925	Steeplechase A.A., Rockaway Beach, Queens, New York City, New York, U.S	
86	Loss	58–22–4 (2)	Art Weigand	PTS	6	Jun 25, 1925	Bison Stadium, Buffalo, New York, U.S	
85	Loss	58–21–4 (2)	Paul Berlenbach	TKO	10 (12)	Mar 13, 1925	Madison Square Garden, New York City, New York, U.S	
84	Loss	58–20–4 (2)	Jack Burke	PTS	12	Dec 4, 1924	Clermont Avenue Rink, Brooklyn, New York City, New York, U.S	
83	Draw	58–19–4 (2)	Frank Kearns	PTS	10	Nov 27, 1924	Arena, Syracuse, New York, U.S	
82	Loss	58–19–3 (2)	Tony Marullo	PTS	12	Nov 14, 1924	Madison Square Garden, New York City, New York, U.S	
81	Win	58–18–3 (2)	Roscoe Hall	TKO	6 (10)	Nov 7, 1924	Passaic Armory, Passaic, New Jersey, U.S	
80	Loss	57–18–3 (2)	Mike Conroy	TKO	8 (10)	Aug 20, 1924	Lorain, Ohio, U.S	
79	Loss	57–17–3 (2)	Homer Smith	PTS	10	Aug 11, 1924	Bison Stadium, Buffalo, New York, U.S	
78	Win	57–16–3 (2)	Dixie Kid	RTD	3 (10)	Aug 4, 1924	Fair Grounds Arena, Allentown, Pennsylvania, U.S	Not to be confused with Dixie Kid
77	Loss	56–16–3 (2)	Sergeant Jack Lynch	PTS	10	Aug 2, 1924	Clinton Oval, Woonsocket, Rhode Island, U.S	
76	Win	56–15–3 (2)	Blacksmith Russell	KO	7 (10)	Jul 18, 1924	Textile Field, Manchester, New Hampshire, U.S	
75	Win	55–15–3 (2)	Ray Bennett	NWS	12	Jul 11, 1924	Bellaire, Ohio, U.S	
74	Loss	55–15–3 (1)	Tut Jackson	PTS	10	Feb 14, 1924	Fort Hayes Arena, Columbus, Ohio, U.S	
73	Win	55–14–3 (1)	Joe White	PTS	10	Feb 8, 1924	Rochester, New York, U.S	
72	Loss	54–14–3 (1)	Joe Lohman	NWS	10	Jan 31, 1924	Kenwood Armory, Minneapolis, Minnesota, U.S	
71	Loss	54–14–3	Battling Owens	PTS	15	Jan 21, 1924	Louisiana Auditorium, New Orleans, Louisiana, U.S	
70	Win	54–13–3	Young Norfolk	PTS	8	Jan 14, 1924	Southern A.C., Memphis, Tennessee, U.S	
69	Win	53–13–3	Tony Stabenau	KO	2 (10)	Jan 7, 1924	Broadway Auditorium, Buffalo, New York, U.S	
68	Loss	52–13–3	Jack Taylor	PTS	10	Dec 25, 1923	Adelphia A.C., Philadelphia, Pennsylvania, U.S	
67	Loss	52–12–3	Kid Norfolk	PTS	15	Nov 20, 1923	Madison Square Garden, New York, U.S	
66	Win	52–11–3	Gaston Marmouget	KO	3 (12)	Aug 5, 1923	Arènes du Bouscat, Bordeaux, France	
65	Win	51–11–3	Marcel Nilles	KO	2 (15)	Jul 8, 1923	Stade Buffalo, Montrouge, France	
64	Loss	50–11–3	Emile Morelle	DQ	6 (20)	Jun 16, 1923	Velodrome d'Hiver, Paris, France	
63	Loss	50–10–3	Mike McTigue	PTS	20	Mar 17, 1923	La Scala Theatre, Dublin, Ireland	Lost NBA and NYSAC light heavyweight-titles
62	Win	50–9–3	Georges Carpentier	KO	6 (20)	Sep 24, 1922	Stade Buffalo, Montrouge, France	Won NBA, NYSAC, and IBU light-heavyweight titles; Won IBU heavyweight title
61	Win	49–9–3	Harry Reeve	TKO	6 (15)	Jul 27, 1922	Marseille, France	
60	Win	48–9–3	Hans Dressler	TKO	5 (6)	Jul 23, 1922	Circus Schouwburg, Rotterdam, Netherlands	
59	Win	47–9–3	Marcel Nilles	PTS	15	Jun 23, 1922	Velodrome d'Hiver, Paris, France	
58	Draw	46–9–3	Harry Reeve	PTS	10	May 19, 1922	Hippodrome-paleis, Antwerpen, Belgium	
57	Win	46–9–2	Harry Reeve	PTS	10	May 11, 1922	Theater Carré, Amsterdam, Netherlands	
56	Win	45–9–2	Alfred Baker	PTS	12	Apr 26, 1922	Frontón Condal, Barcelona, Spain	
55	Win	44–9–2	Louis Piochelle	PTS	12	Apr 16, 1922	Stade Municipal, Algiers, Algeria	
54	Win	43–9–2	Martinus Vige	TKO	6 (10)	Mar 31, 1922	Circus Schouwburg, Rotterdam, Netherlands	
53	Win	42–9–2	Frank Hoche	PTS	10	Mar 23, 1922	Iris Park, Barcelona, Spain	
52	Win	41–9–2	Alphonse Rogiers	PTS	10	Mar 15, 1922	Salle de Trocadero, Brussels, Belgium	
51	Win	40–9–2	Jules Lenaers	TKO	2 (15)	Mar 3, 1922	Palais des Fêtes, Strasbourg, France	
50	Win	39–9–2	Iter	TKO	2 (?)	Feb 2, 1922	Palais des Fêtes, Strasbourg, France	
49	Win	38–9–2	Alphonse Rogiers	PTS	12	Jan 17, 1922	Cirque de Paris, Paris, France	
48	Win	37–9–2	Paul Journee	PTS	15	Dec 3, 1921	Velodrome d'Hiver, Paris, France	
47	Win	36–9–2	Jean Leroi	KO	2 (20)	Oct 21, 1921	Magic City, Paris, France	
46	Win	35–9–2	Jean Leroi	TKO	2 (20)	Oct 21, 1921	Magic City, Paris, France	
45	Win	34–9–2	Battling Marcot	TKO	5 (15)	Oct 2, 1921	Arènes des Amidonniers, Toulouse, France	
44	Win	33–9–2	Ercole De Balzac	DQ	2 (20)	Sep 21, 1921	Salle Wagram, Paris, France	
43	Win	32–9–2	Constant Barrick	PTS	10	Aug 21, 1921	Arènes du Rond-Point du Prado, Marseille, France	
42	Win	31–9–2	Gabriel Pionnier	TKO	7 (15)	Jul 2, 1921	Salle Wagram, Paris, France	
41	Win	30–9–2	Harry Reeve	PTS	10	Jun 14, 1921	De Doelen, Rotterdam, Netherlands	
40	Win	29–9–2	Jeff DePaus	PTS	10	Apr 29, 1921	Antwerpen, Belgium	
39	Win	28–9–2	Hugo Podzuhn	TKO	10 (15)	Mar 15, 1921	Sagebiel, Germany	
38	Win	27–9–2	Giuseppe Spalla	RTD	9 (15)	Feb 25, 1921	Zirkus Busch, Mitte, Germany	
37	Win	26–9–2	Bertus Ahaus	PTS	10	Feb 5, 1921	Concertgebouw, Amsterdam, Netherlands	
36	Win	25–9–2	Herman Sjouwerman	PTS	10	Jan 19, 1921	Paleis voor Volksvlijt, Amsterdam, Netherlands	
35	Win	24–9–2	Hans Breitenstraeter	PTS	15	Jan 14, 1921	Admiralspalast, Mitte, Germany	
34	Win	23–9–2	Jeff DePaus	PTS	10	Dec 4, 1920	Concertgebouw, Amsterdam, Netherlands	
33	Win	22–9–2	Nicol Simpson	KO	1 (15)	Oct 25, 1920	Concertgebouw, Amsterdam, Netherlands	
32	Loss	21–9–2	Tom Berry	PTS	15	Aug 30, 1920	Circus Schouwburg, Rotterdam, Netherlands	
31	Win	21–8–2	Tom Berry	PTS	10	Jun 17, 1920	Circus Schouwburg, Rotterdam, Netherlands	
30	Win	20–8–2	Willem Westbroek	TKO	5 (10)	Jun 4, 1920	Circus Schouwburg, Rotterdam, Netherlands	
29	Win	19–8–2	Daan Holtkamp	KO	2 (10)	Jun 27, 1920	Circus Schouwburg, Rotterdam, Netherlands	
28	Win	18–8–2	Bertus Ahaus	PTS	10	June 13, 1920	Circus Schouwburg, Rotterdam, Netherlands	
27	Win	17–8–2	Jimmy Lyggett Sr.	PTS	10	May 29, 1920	Cirque de Paris, Paris, France	
26	Win	16–8–2	Willem Westbroek	KO	7 (10)	May 2, 1920	Circus Schouwburg, Rotterdam, Netherlands	
25	Win	15–8–2	Rene De Vos	PTS	10	April 28, 1920	Cirque de Paris, Paris, France	
24	Win	14–8–2	Jeff DePaus	PTS	15	Apr 16, 1920	Antwerpen, Belgium	
23	Win	13–8–2	Victor Marchand	KO	8 (15)	April 9, 1920	Nouveau Cirque, Paris, France	
22	Win	12–8–2	Maurice Lefevre	PTS	10	April 2, 1920	Nouveau Cirque, Paris, France	
21	Win	11–8–2	Leon Derensy	KO	3 (10)	Mar 26, 1920	Nouveau Cirque, Paris, France	
20	Win	10–8–2	Jean Audouy	TKO	4 (?)	Feb 16, 1920	Théâtre des Nouveautés, Toulouse, France	
19	Win	9–8–2	Billy Henrys	PTS	12	Jan 12, 1920	Théâtre des Nouveautés, Toulouse, France	
18	Loss	8–8–2	Felix Leonard	PTS	10	Dec 29, 1919	Théâtre des Nouveautés, Toulouse, France	
17	Win	8–7–2	Eugene Stuber	TKO	2 (10)	Dec 8, 1919	Théâtre des Nouveautés, Toulouse, France	
16	Win	7–7–2	Frank Roose	DQ	9 (10)	May 12, 1918	Arènes des Amidonniers, Toulouse, France	
15	Loss	6–7–2	Eugene Tajan	DQ	7 (?)	July 12, 1914	Place Lamourguier, Narbonne, France	
14	Loss	6–6–2	Jules Perroud	PTS	10	June 20, 1914	Salle du Jardin Royal, Toulouse, France	
13	Win	6–5–2	Jules Perroud	DQ	8 (10)	June 4, 1914	Salle du Jardin Royal, Toulouse, France	
12	Win	5–5–2	Pierre Nicolas	KO	2 (10)	Feb 19, 1914	Théâtre des Nouveautés, Toulouse, France	
11	Loss	4–5–2	Jean Audouy	PTS	10	Feb 7, 1914	Salle des Fêtes, Narbonne, France	
10	Win	4–4–2	Frank Roose	PTS	10	Jan 8, 1914	Théâtre des Nouveautés, Toulouse, France	
9	Win	3–4–2	Frank Roose	PTS	10	Dec 16, 1913	Théâtre des Nouveautés, Toulouse, France	
8	Win	2–4–2	Georges Carr	TKO	3 (?)	Nov 29, 1913	Toulouse, France	
7	Win	1–4–2	Georges Bert	TKO	3 (?)	May 18, 1913	Montreuil, France	
6	Loss	0–4–2	Bill Henrys	DQ	3 (?)	May 3, 1913	Eldorado-Casino, Marseille, France	
5	Loss	0–3–2	Francois Servat	PTS	8	Mar 27, 1913	Comoedia-Cinéma, Marseille, France	
4	Draw	0–2–2	Fernard Pratt	PTS	8	Mar 13, 1912	Comoedia-Cinéma, Marseille, France	
3	Draw	0–2–1	Mario Gall	PTS	8	Dec 16, 1912	France	
2	Loss	0–2	Jean Chayne	TKO	2 (?)	Oct 20, 1912	Stand Bènes, Saint-Laurent-du-Var, France	
1	Loss	0–1	Louis Maria	RTD	2 (6)	Oct 13, 1912	Stand du Pré-du-Lac, Châteauneuf-Grasse, France	

=== Unofficial record ===
91 fights	61 wins	26 losses
By knockout	31	4
By decision	27	18
By disqualification	3	4
Draws	4	

Record with the inclusion of newspaper decisions in the win/loss/draw column.

No.	Result	Record	Opponent	Type	Round	Date	Location	Notes
91	Loss	61–26–4	Lee Anderson	PTS	12	Nov 13, 1925	104th Regiment Armory, Baltimore, Maryland, U.S	
90	Loss	61–25–4	Billy Vidabeck	NWS	10	Aug 18, 1925	Playgrounds Stadium, West New York, New Jersey, U.S	
89	Loss	61–24–4	Joe Silvani	DQ	8 (12)	Aug 8, 1925	Commonwealth Sporting Club, New York City, New York, U.S	
88	Win	61–23–4	Jimmy Francis	KO	2 (8)	Jul 23, 1925	Playgrounds Stadium, West New York, New Jersey, U.S	
87	Win	60–23–4	Chief Halbran	KO	3 (12)	Jul 10, 1925	Steeplechase A.A., Rockaway Beach, Queens, New York City, New York, U.S	
86	Loss	59–23–4	Art Weigand	PTS	6	Jun 25, 1925	Bison Stadium, Buffalo, New York, U.S	
85	Loss	59–22–4	Paul Berlenbach	TKO	10 (12)	Mar 13, 1925	Madison Square Garden, New York City, New York, U.S	
84	Loss	59–21–4	Jack Burke	PTS	12	Dec 4, 1924	Clermont Avenue Rink, Brooklyn, New York City, New York, U.S	
83	Draw	59–20–4	Frank Kearns	PTS	10	Nov 27, 1924	Arena, Syracuse, New York, U.S	
82	Loss	59–20–3	Tony Marullo	PTS	12	Nov 14, 1924	Madison Square Garden, New York City, New York, U.S	
81	Win	59–19–3	Roscoe Hall	TKO	6 (10)	Nov 7, 1924	Passaic Armory, Passaic, New Jersey, U.S	
80	Loss	58–19–3	Mike Conroy	TKO	8 (10)	Aug 20, 1924	Lorain, Ohio, U.S	
79	Loss	58–18–3	Homer Smith	PTS	10	Aug 11, 1924	Bison Stadium, Buffalo, New York, U.S	
78	Win	58–17–3	Dixie Kid	RTD	3 (10)	Aug 4, 1924	Fair Grounds Arena, Allentown, Pennsylvania, U.S	Not to be confused with Dixie Kid
77	Loss	57–17–3	Sergeant Jack Lynch	PTS	10	Aug 2, 1924	Clinton Oval, Woonsocket, Rhode Island, U.S	
76	Win	57–16–3	Blacksmith Russell	KO	7 (10)	Jul 18, 1924	Textile Field, Manchester, New Hampshire, U.S	
75	Win	56–16–3	Ray Bennett	NWS	12	Jul 11, 1924	Bellaire, Ohio, U.S	
74	Loss	55–16–3	Tut Jackson	PTS	10	Feb 14, 1924	Fort Hayes Arena, Columbus, Ohio, U.S	
73	Win	55–15–3	Joe White	PTS	10	Feb 8, 1924	Rochester, New York, U.S	
72	Loss	54–15–3	Joe Lohman	NWS	10	Jan 31, 1924	Kenwood Armory, Minneapolis, Minnesota, U.S	
71	Loss	54–14–3	Battling Owens	PTS	15	Jan 21, 1924	Louisiana Auditorium, New Orleans, Louisiana, U.S	
70	Win	54–13–3	Young Norfolk	PTS	8	Jan 14, 1924	Southern A.C., Memphis, Tennessee, U.S	
69	Win	53–13–3	Tony Stabenau	KO	2 (10)	Jan 7, 1924	Broadway Auditorium, Buffalo, New York, U.S	
68	Loss	52–13–3	Jack Taylor	PTS	10	Dec 25, 1923	Adelphia A.C., Philadelphia, Pennsylvania, U.S	
67	Loss	52–12–3	Kid Norfolk	PTS	15	Nov 20, 1923	Madison Square Garden, New York, U.S	
66	Win	52–11–3	Gaston Marmouget	KO	3 (12)	Aug 5, 1923	Arènes du Bouscat, Bordeaux, France	
65	Win	51–11–3	Marcel Nilles	KO	2 (15)	Jul 8, 1923	Stade Buffalo, Montrouge, France	
64	Loss	50–11–3	Emile Morelle	DQ	6 (20)	Jun 16, 1923	Velodrome d'Hiver, Paris, France	
63	Loss	50–10–3	Mike McTigue	PTS	20	Mar 17, 1923	La Scala Theatre, Dublin, Ireland	Lost NBA and NYSAC light heavyweight-titles
62	Win	50–9–3	Georges Carpentier	KO	6 (20)	Sep 24, 1922	Stade Buffalo, Montrouge, France	Won NBA, NYSAC, and IBU light-heavyweight titles; Won IBU heavyweight title
61	Win	49–9–3	Harry Reeve	TKO	6 (15)	Jul 27, 1922	Marseille, France	
60	Win	48–9–3	Hans Dressler	TKO	5 (6)	Jul 23, 1922	Circus Schouwburg, Rotterdam, Netherlands	
59	Win	47–9–3	Marcel Nilles	PTS	15	Jun 23, 1922	Velodrome d'Hiver, Paris, France	
58	Draw	46–9–3	Harry Reeve	PTS	10	May 19, 1922	Hippodrome-paleis, Antwerpen, Belgium	
57	Win	46–9–2	Harry Reeve	PTS	10	May 11, 1922	Theater Carré, Amsterdam, Netherlands	
56	Win	45–9–2	Alfred Baker	PTS	12	Apr 26, 1922	Frontón Condal, Barcelona, Spain	
55	Win	44–9–2	Louis Piochelle	PTS	12	Apr 16, 1922	Stade Municipal, Algiers, Algeria	
54	Win	43–9–2	Martinus Vige	TKO	6 (10)	Mar 31, 1922	Circus Schouwburg, Rotterdam, Netherlands	
53	Win	42–9–2	Frank Hoche	PTS	10	Mar 23, 1922	Iris Park, Barcelona, Spain	
52	Win	41–9–2	Alphonse Rogiers	PTS	10	Mar 15, 1922	Salle de Trocadero, Brussels, Belgium	
51	Win	40–9–2	Jules Lenaers	TKO	2 (15)	Mar 3, 1922	Palais des Fêtes, Strasbourg, France	
50	Win	39–9–2	Iter	TKO	2 (?)	Feb 2, 1922	Palais des Fêtes, Strasbourg, France	
49	Win	38–9–2	Alphonse Rogiers	PTS	12	Jan 17, 1922	Cirque de Paris, Paris, France	
48	Win	37–9–2	Paul Journee	PTS	15	Dec 3, 1921	Velodrome d'Hiver, Paris, France	
47	Win	36–9–2	Jean Leroi	KO	2 (20)	Oct 21, 1921	Magic City, Paris, France	
46	Win	35–9–2	Jean Leroi	TKO	2 (20)	Oct 21, 1921	Magic City, Paris, France	
45	Win	34–9–2	Battling Marcot	TKO	5 (15)	Oct 2, 1921	Arènes des Amidonniers, Toulouse, France	
44	Win	33–9–2	Ercole De Balzac	DQ	2 (20)	Sep 21, 1921	Salle Wagram, Paris, France	
43	Win	32–9–2	Constant Barrick	PTS	10	Aug 21, 1921	Arènes du Rond-Point du Prado, Marseille, France	
42	Win	31–9–2	Gabriel Pionnier	TKO	7 (15)	Jul 2, 1921	Salle Wagram, Paris, France	
41	Win	30–9–2	Harry Reeve	PTS	10	Jun 14, 1921	De Doelen, Rotterdam, Netherlands	
40	Win	29–9–2	Jeff DePaus	PTS	10	Apr 29, 1921	Antwerpen, Belgium	
39	Win	28–9–2	Hugo Podzuhn	TKO	10 (15)	Mar 15, 1921	Sagebiel, Germany	
38	Win	27–9–2	Giuseppe Spalla	RTD	9 (15)	Feb 25, 1921	Zirkus Busch, Mitte, Germany	
37	Win	26–9–2	Bertus Ahaus	PTS	10	Feb 5, 1921	Concertgebouw, Amsterdam, Netherlands	
36	Win	25–9–2	Herman Sjouwerman	PTS	10	Jan 19, 1921	Paleis voor Volksvlijt, Amsterdam, Netherlands	
35	Win	24–9–2	Hans Breitenstraeter	PTS	15	Jan 14, 1921	Admiralspalast, Mitte, Germany	
34	Win	23–9–2	Jeff DePaus	PTS	10	Dec 4, 1920	Concertgebouw, Amsterdam, Netherlands	
33	Win	22–9–2	Nicol Simpson	KO	1 (15)	Oct 25, 1920	Concertgebouw, Amsterdam, Netherlands	
32	Loss	21–9–2	Tom Berry	PTS	15	Aug 30, 1920	Circus Schouwburg, Rotterdam, Netherlands	
31	Win	21–8–2	Tom Berry	PTS	10	Jun 17, 1920	Circus Schouwburg, Rotterdam, Netherlands	
30	Win	20–8–2	Willem Westbroek	TKO	5 (10)	Jun 4, 1920	Circus Schouwburg, Rotterdam, Netherlands	
29	Win	19–8–2	Daan Holtkamp	KO	2 (10)	Jun 27, 1920	Circus Schouwburg, Rotterdam, Netherlands	
28	Win	18–8–2	Bertus Ahaus	PTS	10	June 13, 1920	Circus Schouwburg, Rotterdam, Netherlands	
27	Win	17–8–2	Jimmy Lyggett Sr.	PTS	10	May 29, 1920	Cirque de Paris, Paris, France	
26	Win	16–8–2	Willem Westbroek	KO	7 (10)	May 2, 1920	Circus Schouwburg, Rotterdam, Netherlands	
25	Win	15–8–2	Rene De Vos	PTS	10	April 28, 1920	Cirque de Paris, Paris, France	
24	Win	14–8–2	Jeff DePaus	PTS	15	Apr 16, 1920	Antwerpen, Belgium	
23	Win	13–8–2	Victor Marchand	KO	8 (15)	April 9, 1920	Nouveau Cirque, Paris, France	
22	Win	12–8–2	Maurice Lefevre	PTS	10	April 2, 1920	Nouveau Cirque, Paris, France	
21	Win	11–8–2	Leon Derensy	KO	3 (10)	Mar 26, 1920	Nouveau Cirque, Paris, France	
20	Win	10–8–2	Jean Audouy	TKO	4 (?)	Feb 16, 1920	Théâtre des Nouveautés, Toulouse, France	
19	Win	9–8–2	Billy Henrys	PTS	12	Jan 12, 1920	Théâtre des Nouveautés, Toulouse, France	
18	Loss	8–8–2	Felix Leonard	PTS	10	Dec 29, 1919	Théâtre des Nouveautés, Toulouse, France	
17	Win	8–7–2	Eugene Stuber	TKO	2 (10)	Dec 8, 1919	Théâtre des Nouveautés, Toulouse, France	
16	Win	7–7–2	Frank Roose	DQ	9 (10)	May 12, 1918	Arènes des Amidonniers, Toulouse, France	
15	Loss	6–7–2	Eugene Tajan	DQ	7 (?)	July 12, 1914	Place Lamourguier, Narbonne, France	
14	Loss	6–6–2	Jules Perroud	PTS	10	June 20, 1914	Salle du Jardin Royal, Toulouse, France	
13	Win	6–5–2	Jules Perroud	DQ	8 (10)	June 4, 1914	Salle du Jardin Royal, Toulouse, France	
12	Win	5–5–2	Pierre Nicolas	KO	2 (10)	Feb 19, 1914	Théâtre des Nouveautés, Toulouse, France	
11	Loss	4–5–2	Jean Audouy	PTS	10	Feb 7, 1914	Salle des Fêtes, Narbonne, France	
10	Win	4–4–2	Frank Roose	PTS	10	Jan 8, 1914	Théâtre des Nouveautés, Toulouse, France	
9	Win	3–4–2	Frank Roose	PTS	10	Dec 16, 1913	Théâtre des Nouveautés, Toulouse, France	
8	Win	2–4–2	Georges Carr	TKO	3 (?)	Nov 29, 1913	Toulouse, France	
7	Win	1–4–2	Georges Bert	TKO	3 (?)	May 18, 1913	Montreuil, France	
6	Loss	0–4–2	Bill Henrys	DQ	3 (?)	May 3, 1913	Eldorado-Casino, Marseille, France	
5	Loss	0–3–2	Francois Servat	PTS	8	Mar 27, 1913	Comoedia-Cinéma, Marseille, France	
4	Draw	0–2–2	Fernard Pratt	PTS	8	Mar 13, 1912	Comoedia-Cinéma, Marseille, France	
3	Draw	0–2–1	Mario Gall	PTS	8	Dec 16, 1912	France	
2	Loss	0–2	Jean Chayne	TKO	2 (?)	Oct 20, 1912	Stand Bènes, Saint-Laurent-du-Var, France	
1	Loss	0–1	Louis Maria	RTD	2 (6)	Oct 13, 1912	Stand du Pré-du-Lac, Châteauneuf-Grasse, France	

== Titles in boxing ==
=== Major world titles ===
- NYSAC light heavyweight champion (175 lbs)
- NBA (WBA) light heavyweight champion (175 lbs)

=== Regional/International titles ===
- European light heavyweight champion (175 lbs)
- European heavyweight champion (200+ lbs)

=== Undisputed titles ===
- Undisputed light heavyweight champion

== See also ==
- List of light heavyweight boxing champions

== Bibliography ==
- Benson, Peter (2006). Battling Siki: A Tale of Ring Fixes, Race and Murder in the 1920s. Fayetteville: University of Arkansas Press. ISBN 1-55728-888-7.

Achievements
Preceded by Georges Carpentier	World Light Heavyweight Champion; 24 September 1922 – 17 March 1923	Succeeded by Mike McTigue
Light Heavyweight record
Preceded by Bob Fitzsimmons; 52	Shortest Living World Champion; 28; December 15, 1925 – present	Incumbent
