= Pierre Charles (boxer) =

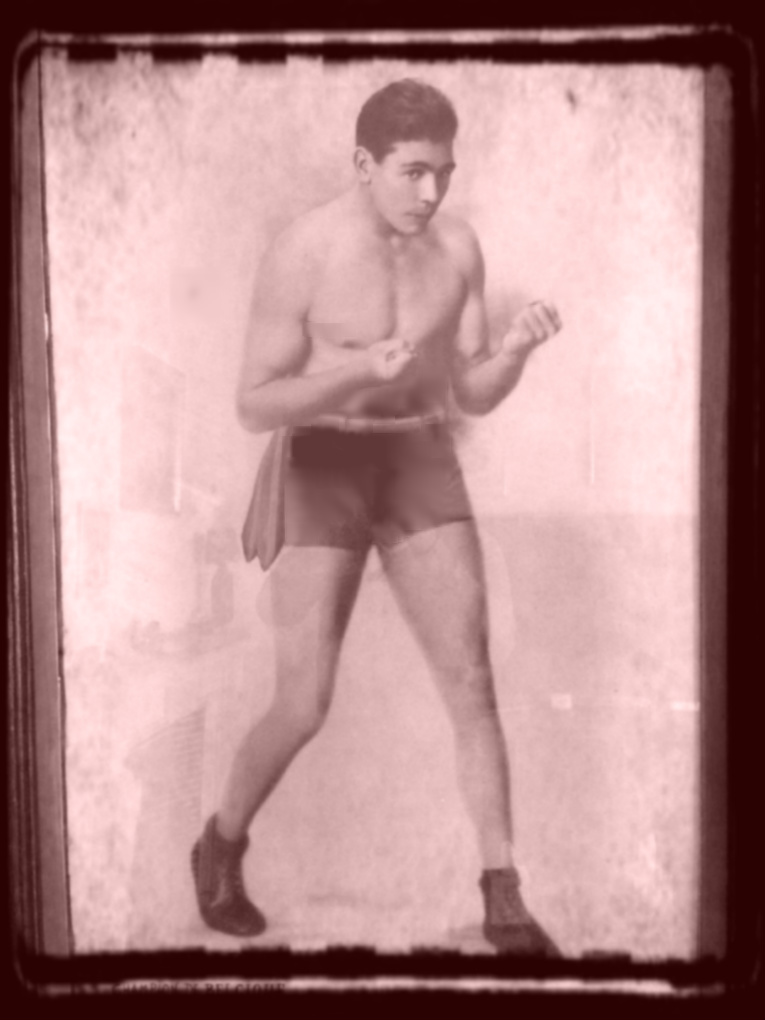

Personal information
- Born: 20 March 1903 Heer–Agimont, Namur, Belgium
- Died: 8 August 1966 (aged 63)
- Height: 6 ft 2.5 in (189 cm)
- Weight: Heavyweight

Boxing career

Boxing record
- Total fights: 98
- Wins: 64
- Win by KO: 30
- Losses: 26
- Draws: 8

Pierre Charles (20 March 1903 – 8 August 1966) was a Belgian boxer who was the heavyweight champion of Belgium and Europe. He held the Belgian title between 1926 and 1927, and again between 1935 and 1936, and the International Boxing Union (IBU) European title for three periods, from 1929 to 1931, 1932 to 1933, and 1935 to 1936.

== Career ==
Charles made his professional debut in April 1922, as a light heavyweight, losing on points over four rounds to Maurice Hennaut. Up to the end of 1925, he had a mixed record, including a run of five straight losses, but from November that year, through to October 1926, he was beaten only once (by Hans Breitenstraeter), including a draw with Ludwig Haymann.

In November 1926 he beat Jack Humbeeck on points to become Belgian heavyweight champion. Over the next six months he had seven fights, including two draws with Gipsy Daniels. He made a successful defence of his Belgian title against Humbeeck in May 1927, but the following month suffered his first loss in almost a year when he was beaten on points by Phil Scott at the Royal Albert Hall. In September that year, he again defended his Belgian title against Humbeeck, this time losing on points.

In early 1928 he travelled to the United States for a series of fights. After fighting a draw against Jack DeMave in January, he stopped Jack McCann in the first round in March, but was again beaten by Scott later that month. He beat Bud Gorman in June, but suffered the second defeat of his spell in the US in August to Otto von Porat, also losing his last fight in America, George Godfrey knocking him out in the second round at the end of the month. He had been set to fight Jack Sharkey, but the fight was cancelled when Sharkey injured his knee.

Charles returned home, and in February 1929 faced Haymann at the Westfalenhalle, Dortmund, for the European heavyweight title vacated by Paulino Uzcudun; Charles took a points decision to become champion of Europe. He successfully defended the European title against Santa Camarão, Giacomo Panfilo, Franz Diener, and Søren Petersen.

In February 1930 he travelled to the US once again, to face NYSAC world light heavyweight champion Tommy Loughran, a fight he lost on points.

Charles made two more successful defences of his European title, against Roberto Roberti and Piet van der Veer, before returning to the US for a further series of fights in 1931. On this visit he won all three fights, against Jack Renault, Paul Pantaleo, and Frankie Simms.

In July 1931 he made a further defence of his European title against Maurice Griselle, but after seven successful defences, lost it in on points in August to Hein Müller. In December 1931 he regained the title, knocking out Innocente Baiguera in the fourth round.

In January 1932 he beat Gipsy Daniels, but was beaten by Primo Carnera (who was 65 lbs heavier) on points in February. He defended the European title in May against Mueller, but lost it for a second time in May 1933 when Uzcudun took a split decision win in Madrid. In October 1935, Charles faced George Godfrey once again, for the vacant IBU world heavyweight title in Brussels; Godfrey again won, on points. Uzcudun subsequently pursued the world title and relinquished the European title, giving Charles the chance to regain it against Vincenz Hower, Charles taking a points decision to become European champion for the third time. He defended the European title against fellow Belgian Gustave Limousin in November 1935, with the Belgian title also at stake; Charles won by a wide unanimous points decision, taking the Belgian title for the second time.

Charles was stripped of the European title in April 1936 after failing to defend it within the specified time period. He fought Arno Kölblin for the vacant title in Charlottenburg in March 1937, but lost on points.

Charles was then out of the ring for over two years, before returning to fight Romanian champion Motzi Spakow in May 1939. Charles lost on points in what proved to be his final fight. He finished his career with a record of 64 wins from 98 fights, with 26 losses and 8 draws.
