= Harry Crossley =

British boxer

Personal information
- Nationality: British
- Born: 4 May 1904
- Died: 6 December 1948 (aged 44) Leicester, England
- Weight: Light heavyweight, heavyweight

Boxing career

Boxing record
- Total fights: 94
- Wins: 62
- Win by KO: 14
- Losses: 20
- Draws: 11

Harry Crossley (4 May 1904 – 6 December 1948) was a British boxer who was British light heavyweight champion between 1929 and 1932.

== Life and career ==
Crossley was based in Mexborough, Yorkshire. Being a miner by trade, he began his boxing career with two bouts in his hometown in 1924. A run of wins up to 1928 saw him fighting tougher opposition and he travelled to Berlin in April 1928 to fight Ludwig Haymann, losing a points decision. After two fights back in England he returned to Germany for a series of fights in the second half of 1928, including a drawn match with the experienced Rudi Wagener.

In June 1929, Crossley fought for his first title, the Northern Area light heavyweight title, in which he lost to Len Johnson on points. When Johnson vacated the title, Crossley got another shot later in June against Young Fowler; This time Crossley took a points decision to win the title. He followed this with a win over Gipsy Daniels, and then fought heavyweight Larry Gains in Cologne, losing on points. At the time, he was the only British fighter to take Gains the distance.

In November 1929, he fought Frank Moody at Holborn Stadium for the British light heavyweight title, winning a points decision to take the title. Over the next few years, Crossley beat the likes of the heavyweight Reggie Meen, Gipsy Daniels (twice), earned a draw against Len Johnson (Crossley offered Johnson a shot at his title but it wasn't sanctioned due to Johnson being of mixed race), and was beaten by Meen, Jimmy Tarante, Don McCorkindale and German champion Ernst Pistulla, before defending his light heavyweight title against Jack Petersen in May 1932; Petersen won a points decision to take the title. Crossley subsequently beat Daniels and Charley Smith. After Peteresen relinquished the title, Crossley was due to fight the winner of an eliminator between Eddie Phillips and Len Harvey for the vacant title, but he withdrew from the light heavyweight division to focus on fighting at heavyweight. His final two fights were defeats by knockout to Petersen and Gains in the early part of 1934.

He retired from boxing in March 1934. Crossley married Eva Williams of Leicester on 8 January 1935. He became the licensee of the Broadway Hotel in Leicester.

== Death ==
Crossley died in a Leicester hospital in 1948, aged 44, after a two-year illness. He was buried in the churchyard at Swinton, close to his former home of Mexborough.

== See also ==
- List of British light-heavyweight boxing champions
