= Phil Scott (boxer) =

English boxer

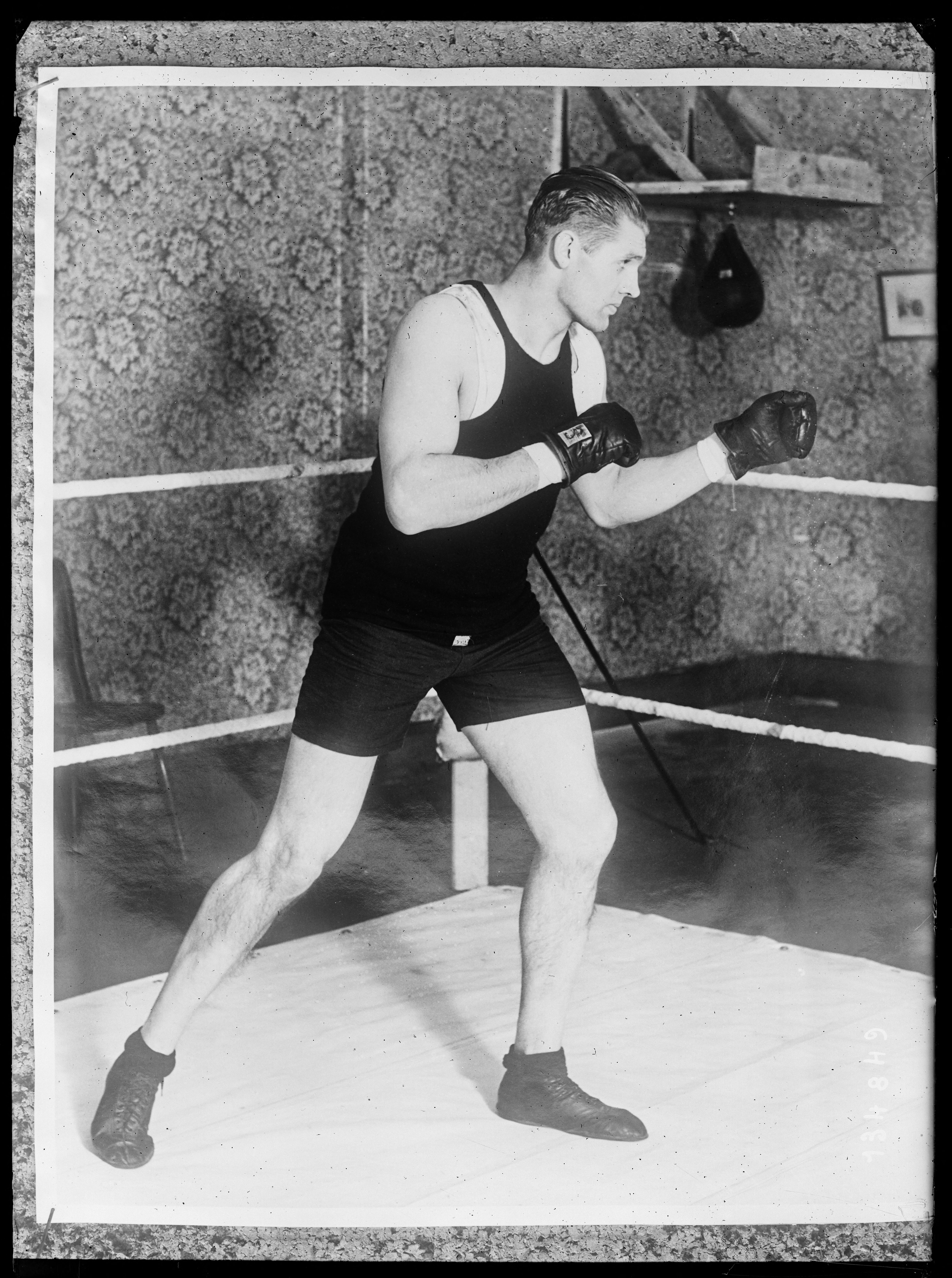

Personal information
- Nationality: English
- Born: Philip Scott Suffling; 3 January 1900 Paddington, London, England
- Died: 4 December 1983 (aged 83)
- Height: 6 ft 3 1/2 in (1.92 m)
- Weight: Heavyweight

Boxing career
- Reach: 82 in (208 cm)

Boxing record
- Total fights: 85
- Wins: 65 (KO 29)
- Losses: 13 (KO 8)
- Draws: 5
- No contests: 2

Philip Scott Suffling (3 January 1900 – 4 December 1983), born in Paddington, London, was an English professional heavyweight boxer of the 1910s, 1920s and 1930s, who won the National Sporting Club (NSC) (subsequently known as the British Boxing Board of Control (BBBofC)) British heavyweight title, British Empire heavyweight title, and European Boxing Union (EBU) heavyweight title, his professional fighting weight varied from 195.25 lb (88.56 kg; 13 st 13.25 lb) to 218 lb (98.9 kg; 15 st 8.0 lb).

He joined the Royal Navy aged 15, and served as a seaman aboard HMS Trafalgar during the First World War, after the war, he was a police officer at Scotland Yard for two years, then a fireman for the London Fire Brigade from June 1922 to June 1924, and in 1933 he became a boxing instructor for the Egyptian National Police. Scott started his professional boxing career in 1919. His coaches admitted that he knew virtually nothing about "infighting", but that he had a fast left hand. He appeared on the cover of the November 1929 edition of The Ring magazine, and he co-wrote a book with R. James Alexander called The Complete Boxer, a textbook on boxing which sold for a shilling.

== Boxing career ==
Scott's first professional boxing bout was a draw with Piper Taylor at Edinburgh, Scotland, on 15 March 1919.

His record included:

- Four wins, and then a draw with, and a victory over Petty Officer Prizeman (South Africa).

- Seven wins, three defeats, two no contests, and then a draw with Piet van der Veer (Netherlands) in London on 23 November 1921, two wins, and then a draw with van der Veer at Circus Schouwburg in Rotterdam, Netherlands, on 6 November 1921, three wins, and then a points defeat by van der Veer at Haagsche Zoo, The Hague, Netherlands, on 21 December 1921.

- Four wins, and then a knockout defeat by Albert 'Kid' Lloyd (Australia) in London on 4 November 1922, seven wins, and then a points victory over Lloyd in London on 31 January 1924.

- Three wins, and then a points victory over Bertus Ahaus (Netherlands) in London on 29 March 1924.

- A points victory over Jack Humbeeck (Belgium) at Premierland in Whitechapel, London, on 24 April 1924.

- A points victory over George Cook (Australia) at the Royal Albert Hall in London on 29 May 1924.

- One win, and then a technical knockout victory over Andre Anderson (United States) at Wembley Stadium, London, on 9 August 1924.

- One win, and then a points victory over Tom Heeney (New Zealand) for the vacant British Empire heavyweight title at The Ring in Blackfriars Road, London, on 22 September 1924.

- One defeat, and then a points victory over Soldier Horace Jones (a.k.a. John Horace Beaudin) at the National Sporting Club in Covent Garden, London, on 10 November 1924.

- One win, and then a points victory over Paul Samson Koerner (a.k.a. Paul Sampson) (Germany) in Berlin, Germany, on 27 February 1925.

- Four wins, and then a knockout defeat by Paulino Uzcudun (Spain) at Plaza de Toros de Bilbao, Spain, on 6 September 1925.

- A disqualification victory over George Cook (Australia) for the vacant British Empire heavyweight title at the Industrial Hall in Edinburgh on 27 January 1926.

- A knockout victory over Frank Goddard for the British heavyweight title at the Royal Albert Hall on 18 March 1926.

- A retirement victory over Noel Hugh McCormick defending the British heavyweight title at the King's Hall in, Belle Vue, Manchester, on 30 April 1926.

- A knockout defeat by Harry Persson (Sweden) for the European Boxing Union (EBU) heavyweight title at Holland Park Rink in London on 14 June 1926.

- A points victory over Tom Heeney (New Zealand) defending the British Empire heavyweight title at The Dell in Southampton on 10 July 1926.

- A knockout victory over Marcel Lunaud (France) at Premierland, Whitechapel, London on 2 December 1926.

- A knockout victory over Leon Sebilo (France) at Premierland on 12 December 1926, then in his second bout of the day, a disqualification victory over Armando De Carolis (Italy).

- A disqualification victory over Riccardo Bertazzolo (Italy) for the European Boxing Union (EBU) heavyweight title at the Royal Albert Hall on 27 January 1927.

- A points victory over Franz Diener (Germany) at Berlin Sportpalast, Germany, on 4 March 1927.

- A disqualification victory over Yale Okun (USA) at Olympia in London, on 21 April 1927.

- A disqualification victory over Helmut Siewert (Germany) at Premierland on 16 June 1927.

- One win, and then a points victory over Pierre Charles (Belgium) at the Royal Albert Hall on 27 June 1927.

Scott then travelled to the United States, where he achieved:

- A knockout defeat by Knute Hansen (Denmark) at Madison Square Garden, New York, on 4 November 1927.

- A knockout victory over Monte Munn at St. Nicholas Rink, New York, on 28 November 1927.

- A points defeat by Johnny Risko (Austria) at the Public Auditorium in Cleveland on 7 December 1927.

- A points victory over Pierre Charles (Belgium) at St. Nicholas Rink in New York on 19 March 1928.

- A points victory over Roberto Roberti (Italy) at Madison Square Garden on 11 May 1928.

Scott then travelled home to England and scored:

- A disqualification victory over Ted Sandwina (USA) at the Royal Albert Hall on 31 January 1929.

- A points victory over Ludwig Haymann (Germany) at the Royal Albert Hall on 2 May 1929.

Scott then travelled back to the United States, and achieved

- A points victory over Victorio Campolo (Italy/Argentina) at Ebbets Field, New York, on 23 September 1929.

- A disqualification victory over Otto von Porat (Norway) at Madison Square Garden on 9 December 1929.

- A technical knockout defeat by Jack Sharkey at Madison Square Garden Stadium, Miami, on 27 February 1930.

Scott then travelled back home to England, and went on to:

- A knockout defeat by Young Stribling (USA) at Wimbledon Stadium, London, on 28 July 1930.

- A knockout defeat by Larry Gains (Canada) defending the British Empire heavyweight title at Welford Road Stadium in Leicester on 13 June 1931, his final professional boxing bout.

== Genealogical information ==
Phil Scott Suffling's marriage to Ethel S. (née Moody) was registered during July→September 1922 in Wandsworth district. They had children; June E. Suffling (birth registered April→June 1923), and Iris S. Suffling (birth registered April→June 1929).
