= Jimmy Magill (boxer) =

Irish boxer (1894–1942)

Personal information
- Nationality: British (Northern Irish)
- Born: 31 December 1894
- Died: 8 February 1942 (aged 47)

Sport
- Sport: Boxing
- Club: Royal Ulster Constabulary
Medal record
Representing Northern Ireland
Men's Boxing
Bronze medal – third place	1934 London	middleweight

Jimmy Magill (31 December 1894 – 8 February 1942) was an amateur boxer and Royal Ulster Constabulary officer from Carncastle, near Larne in Northern Ireland.

== Biography ==
Magill was the Amateur Boxing Association of England's middleweight champion in 1934 and 1935 and light heavyweight champion in 1936. He won fights in Boston and New York in an Irish tour of the US in 1935, was European Police champion from 1931 to 1936 and won a bronze medal representing Northern Ireland at the 1934 British Empire Games. As the Irish Amateur Boxing Association governed the sport in Northern Ireland, he was considered ineligible to compete for both Great Britain at the Olympics and Ireland at the Olympics. In 1936, Magill defeated Richard Vogt, who as a German Army Captain in 1940 saved the life of an Irish Guardsman wounded in the Dunkirk evacuation because they both knew Magill.

Magill was one of twelve children, and the youngest of seven brothers. His brother Davy Magill was the 1921 Royal Irish Constabulary heavyweight champion, and later in the 1920s was Irish professional champion at heavyweight and light heavyweight.
