= Reggie Meen =

English boxer

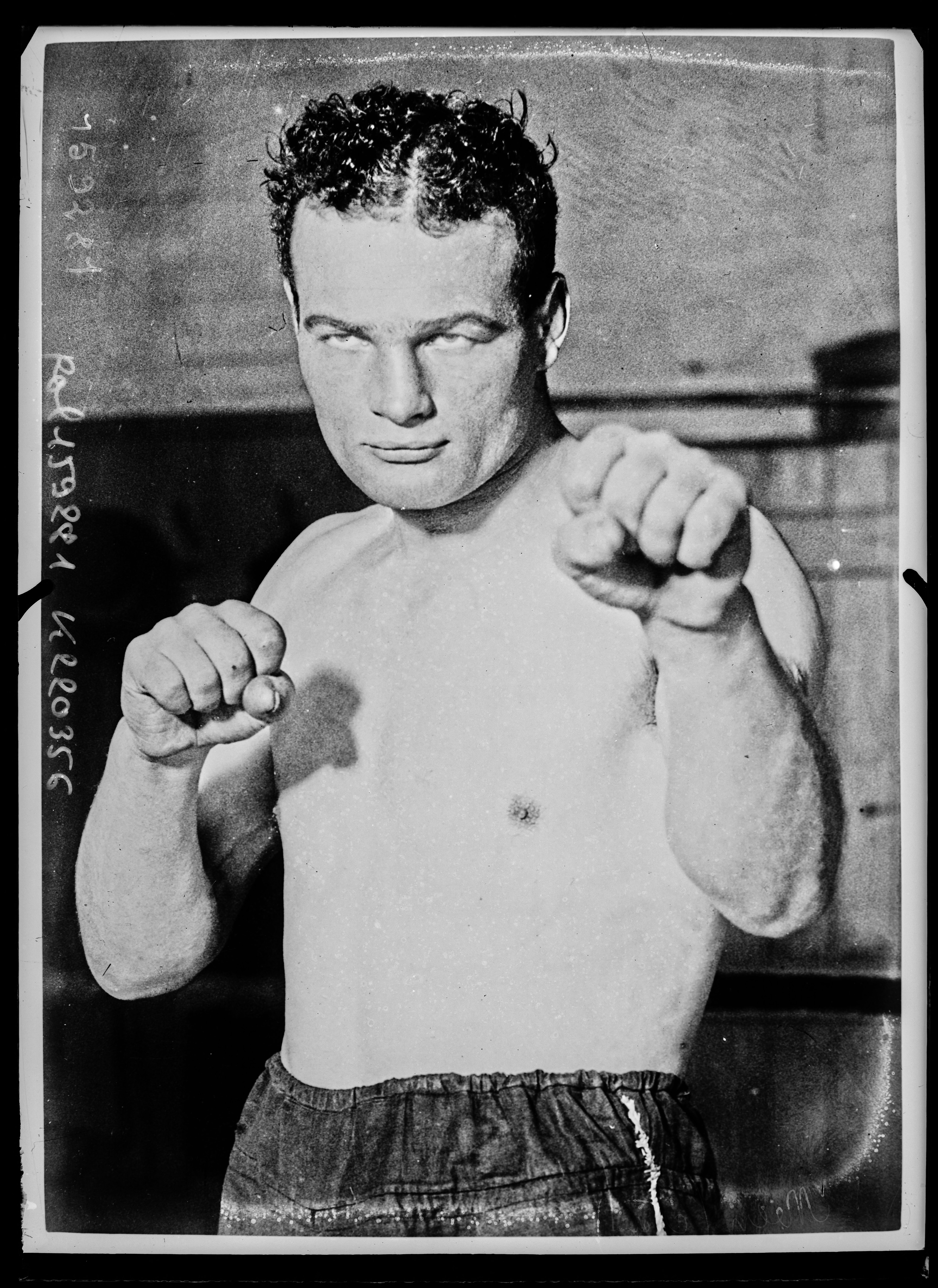

Personal information
- Nationality: British
- Born: 20 November 1907 Southam, Warwickshire, England
- Died: 1984 (aged 76)
- Height: 6 ft 1 in (185 cm)
- Weight: Heavyweight

Boxing career

Boxing record
- Total fights: 102
- Wins: 57
- Win by KO: 48
- Losses: 42
- Draws: 3

Reginald Meen (20 November 1907 – 1984) was a British boxer, who won the British heavyweight title in 1931.

== Career ==
Reggie Meen was born in Southam, Warwickshire in 1907 and grew up in Desborough, Northamptonshire, where he was originally a bootmaker by profession.

Meen's boxing career began in August 1927, and after mixed results initially went on to win eight consecutive fights between 1928 and 1929. He fought Primo Carnera at the Royal Albert Hall in front of a crowd of 10,000 in December 1930, losing in two rounds. After another period of mixed results he hit another winning streak in 1931, including a victory against French champion Maurice Griselle, leading to a fight for the vacant BBBofC heavyweight title against Charley Smith in November, which he won on points despite a cut over his left eye sustained in the second round.

His next fight was a challenge for the EBU heavyweight title against Hein Müller in January 1932, which he lost by a fourth-round knockout. He fought Australian champion George Cook in March in an eliminator for a British Empire championship fight, losing on points. Meen was due to have his first fight outside England in May 1932, but after travelling to Egypt to fight Salah El Din, the two were unable to agree terms and he returned home.

Meen held the British title until July 1932, when he was beaten by Jack Petersen by a second-round knockout. In September 1932 he indicated that he was considering retirement from boxing, after defeat to Don McCorkindale, but returned two months later with a win over Bob Carvill. Meen fought Larry Gains in February 1933, losing after being disqualified for holding. He fought Petersen again in February 1934 in front of 10,000 people at the Granby Halls and again lost in two rounds, although Meen's supporters suspected a low blow had ended the fight, leading to fighting at ringside, and spectators smashed windows to get more air.

In October 1934 he suffered a broken arm during a crash in which his car overturned, requiring a second operation in December to remove splinters of bone, and it was ten months before he returned to boxing, although he took up all-in wrestling, winning his first contest in March 1935.

In September 1935 he suffered head injuries and concussion after slipping while walking through Covent Garden, and caused concern when he went missing from his home; He was found by police in Leyton, unable to recall the events of the past two days. He recovered sufficiently to resume wrestling the following week. Meen returned to boxing and continued to fight until 1938, his final fight a defeat to Tony Arpino, also continuing to wrestle into the late 1930s.

In the late 1930s Meen turned to promotion, including a bill at the Melton Carnival.

During World War II Meen served in the Royal Navy, and in 1945 was stationed in Malta.

Meen married Winifred Ada Littlewood at Oadby Parish Church on 13 April 1936. In October 1952 they emigrated to Canada.
