= Jack London (disambiguation) =

Jack London (1876–1916) was an American author.

Jack London may also refer to:

== People ==
- Jack London (athlete) (1905–1966), British athlete
- Jack London (boxer) (1913–1964), British boxer
- Jack London (businessman) (1937–2021), American technology executive
- Jack London, later Hansadutta Das (1941-2020), German-born religious leader

== Other uses ==
- Jack London (fashion label), Australian men's fashion label
- Jack London (film), a 1943 film biography of the author Jack London

== See also ==
- John London (disambiguation)
- Jack London Square
- Jack London State Historic Park
