= Harry Persson =

Harry Persson may refer to:

- Harry Persson (boxer) (1898–1979), Swedish boxer and actor
- Harry Persson (actor) (1906–1961), Swedish actor and singer
- Harry Arnold (musician) (1920–1971), Swedish jazz musician born Harry Arnold Persson
