= Larry Gains =

Canadian heavyweight boxer (1900–1983)

Personal information
- Nickname: Larrupin' Larry The Toronto Terror
- Born: 12 December 1900 Toronto, Ontario, Canada
- Died: 26 July 1983 (aged 82) Cologne, Germany
- Height: 6 ft 1 in (1.85 m)
- Weight: Heavyweight

Boxing career
- Reach: 77 in (196 cm)

Boxing record
- Total fights: 146; with the inclusion of newspaper decisions
- Wins: 118
- Win by KO: 63
- Losses: 22
- Draws: 5

Lawrence Samuel "Larry" Gains (12 December 1900 – 26 July 1983) was a Black Canadian heavyweight boxer who was champion of Canada and the British Empire. One of the top heavyweights of his era, he was denied the opportunity to become World Champion due to the bar on black boxers competing for the title.

Gains was recognized as the World Colored Heavyweight Champion twice in his career, and was the last to be recognized as such when the title became extinct after Joe Louis won the World Heavyweight title on 22 June 1937.

== Biography ==
Gains was born on Sumach Street in the Cabbagetown neighbourhood of Toronto, Ontario, Canada, on 12 December 1900. He took up boxing at around the age of twenty, after being asked to act as a sparring partner by Charlie Clay, and boxed out of Toronto's Praestamus Club, an organisation for Black boxers.

=== Professional career ===
After a successful amateur career, Gains made the decision to go professional, travelling to Britain on a cattle ship and making his professional début in London as "The Toronto Terror" in June 1923. Many of his early fights were in France (where he befriended Morley Callahan and Ernest Hemingway, who at the time were working as newspaper reporters) and Germany, where he beat Max Schmeling in 1925. On 28 February 1927, he became Canadian Heavyweight Champion when he stopped Horace "Soldier" Jones in five rounds at Toronto. He later defended it against two of the biggest names in Canadian boxing at the time, Jack Renault and Charlie Belanger.

In 1930, Gains settled in Leicester, England, where many of his fights over the next few years were held. Noted primarily as a slick boxer, he KO'd Phil Scott in front of 30,000 spectators at Leicester Tigers' Welford Road ground in 1931, taking the British Empire title, although the colour bar was still in place.

The colour bar was lifted in 1932, and Gains cemented his hold on the title with a victory over white South African Donald McCorkindale at the Royal Albert Hall, the fight ending in an unpopular points decision for Gains, with his trainer Jack Goodwin collapsing and dying during the fight. Gains was the second black fighter to fight at the Royal Albert Hall, as Len Johnson was the first black fighter due to his contest with Adolf Pott being first. Gains went on to beat Primo Carnera in front of 70,000 people at White City, London in May that year (a British record attendance for a boxing match), despite Carnera having an advantage of 60 pounds in weight and a four inches in height. He lost the British Empire title in 1934 to Len Harvey, and failed to regain it later that year, defeated by Jack Petersen in front of a crowd of 64,000 at White City.

=== World coloured heavyweight champion ===
Gains was considered one of the top heavyweights of his era, but was denied the opportunity to fight for the British Championship and the World Championship due to the rules against black boxers competing for the titles, instead competing for the "Coloured Heavyweight Championship of the World", a title that he won in 1928 and 1935. His income from boxing dwindled after 1934 and in 1937 he was declared bankrupt. In December 1938 he defeated Welsh champion George James on points. In 1939, with the advent of World War II, Gains joined the British Army as a physical training instructor. He served as a sergeant major in the Pioneer Corps in the Middle East. His last fight was a defeat to Jack London in June 1942, held to raise funds for the RAF Benevolent Fund.

Gains retired from boxing at the age of 40. He had 143 professional fights, winning 115 and drawing five, most of his defeats coming in the latter years of his career. Gains stated that during his career he won around US$500,000, much of which was lost through gambling.

=== Later life ===
During Larry’s boxing career, he also trained at the Shoeburyness Tavern, which had a boxing gym. Many world champions visited and trained there before their big fights. Alongside his own training, Larry coached young adults, passing on his knowledge and passion for the sport. He trained in various places across the UK, including the George Pub, Jolly Angler, and many others.Jolly Angler

Gains had a succession of low-paid jobs. In 1950 he was working as a labourer in Shoeburyness, Essex. In 1953 he was jailed for three months for stealing £222 12/5 from a British Legion club where he worked as a steward. He pleaded guilty and stated that he would repay the money. He successfully appealed against the sentence and was discharged conditionally after a "well known sporting gentleman" repaid the money along with the court costs. Gains went on to be the singer/drummer in a hotel band in Southend on Sea, Essex. In the early 1960s Gains was living on Tooting Broadway and working as a "salvage collection merchant". Gains later worked in car sales and as a boxing trainer in Morden, near London.

With his wife Lisa, he had four children, Betty, Harold, Anne and John. Gains' autobiography, The Impossible Dream, was published in 1976, the title a reference to his dream of becoming World Champion. Max Schmeling contributed a foreword. Gains died in July 1983 from a heart attack while visiting relatives in Cologne, Germany.

== Legacy and honours ==
In 2020 award-winning author Mark Allen Baker published the first comprehensive account of The World Colored Heavyweight Championship, 1876–1937, with McFarland & Company, a leading independent publisher of academic and nonfiction books. This history traces the advent and demise of the Championship, the stories of the talented professional athletes who won it, and the demarcation of the color line both in and out of the ring.

For decades, the World Colored Heavyweight Championship was a useful tool to combat racial oppression-the existence of the title a leverage mechanism, or tool, used as a technique to counter a social element, “drawing the color line”.

In 2015, Gains was posthumously inducted into the Canada's Sports Hall of Fame.

The amateur boxing HABC trophy that Gains won in March 1922 was restored in 2021 on BBC1 programme The Repair Shop by silversmith Brenton West. The trophy was brought in by his granddaughter and great grandson. (S9E10 aired March 25, 2022 )

In 2023, Gains was inducted into the British boxing Hall of Fame.

On 1 November 2023, the Government of Canada commemorates the national historic significance of Larry Gains (1900–1983) at a special plaque unveiling ceremony at the Cabbagetown Boxing Club in Toronto, Ontario. The unveiling was made on behalf of the Honourable Steven Guilbeault, Minister of Environment and Climate Change and Minister responsible for Parks Canada.

On 12 December 2024, a historic blue plaque was unveiled at the Shoeburyness Hotel in Essex to honour Larry Gains on what would have been his 124th birth anniversary. Gains, who trained at the hotel in 1939 and lived nearby, led a remarkable life. The event was organised by the Nubian Jak Community Trust in partnership with the Gains family, celebrating his legacy and contributions to the sport and community.

== Professional boxing record ==
All information in this section is derived from BoxRec, unless otherwise stated.

=== Official record ===
146 fights	117 wins	22 losses
By knockout	63	14
By decision	49	8
By disqualification	5	0
Draws	5	
No contests	1	
Newspaper decisions/draws	1	

All newspaper decisions are officially regarded as “no decision” bouts and are not counted in the win/loss/draw column.

No.	Result	Record	Opponent	Type	Round, time	Date	Age	Location	Notes
146	Loss	117–22–5 (2)	Jack London	KO	2 (10)	Jun 6, 1942	41 years, 176 days	Caird Hall, Dundee, Scotland, UK	
145	Loss	117–21–5 (2)	Jack London	KO	3 (10)	May 28, 1941	40 years, 167 days	New St. James Hall, Newcastle, Tyne and Wear, England, UK	
144	Win	117–20–5 (2)	Sergeant Elemett	TKO	2 (?)	Feb 19, 1941	40 years, 69 days	Location unknown	
143	Loss	116–20–5 (2)	Jack London	KO	4 (10)	Jan 25, 1941	40 years, 44 days	The Stadium, Liverpool, Merseyside, England, UK	
142	Win	116–19–5 (2)	George James	PTS	4	Feb 12, 1940	39 years, 62 days	Aldershot, Hampshire, England, UK	
141	Loss	115–19–5 (2)	Tommy Farr	TKO	6 (10)	May 17, 1939	38 years, 156 days	Ninian Park, Cardiff, Wales, UK	
140	Loss	115–18–5 (2)	Len Harvey	TKO	13 (15)	Mar 16, 1939	38 years, 94 days	Harringay Arena, London, England, UK	For vacant Commonwealth heavyweight title
139	Win	115–17–5 (2)	George James	PTS	12	Dec 12, 1938	38 years, 0 days	Pavilion, Mountain Ash, Wales, UK	
138	Draw	114–17–5 (2)	Claudio Villar	PTS	12	Oct 14, 1938	37 years, 306 days	Waverley Market, Edinburgh, Scotland, UK	
137	Win	114–17–4 (2)	Harry Staal	PTS	10	Aug 23, 1938	37 years, 254 days	St. Helier Stadium, Jersey, Channel Islands, UK	
136	Win	113–17–4 (2)	Pat Marrinan	PTS	12	Mar 10, 1938	37 years, 88 days	Romford Road Baths, West Ham, London, England, UK	
135	Win	112–17–4 (2)	Albert Di Meglio	KO	1 (?)	Feb 21, 1938	37 years, 71 days	Sheffield, Yorkshire, England, UK	
134	Win	111–17–4 (2)	Bill Wainwright	KO	3 (10)	Jan 17, 1938	37 years, 36 days	Sheffield, Yorkshire, England, UK	Uncertain if this is Bill Wainwright
133	Win	110–17–4 (2)	Presidio Pavesi	KO	2 (12)	Jan 9, 1938	37 years, 28 days	The Ring, Southwark, London, England, UK	
132	Win	109–17–4 (2)	Pinkie Jenkins	KO	3 (?)	Dec 14, 1937	37 years, 2 days	Swansea, Wales, UK	
131	Win	108–17–4 (2)	Jack Pettifer	KO	2 (10), 0:20	Dec 9, 1937	36 years, 362 days	Romford Road Baths, West Ham, London, England, UK	
130	Win	107–17–4 (2)	Hans Schönrath	PTS	10	Nov 2, 1937	36 years, 325 days	Granby Halls, Leicester, Leicestershire, England, UK	
129	Win	106–17–4 (2)	Charles Rutz	KO	2 (10)	Oct 4, 1937	36 years, 296 days	Earls Court Empress Stadium, Kensington, London, England, UK	
128	Win	105–17–4 (2)	Bert Ikin	KO	1 (10)	Aug 14, 1937	36 years, 245 days	Poole Sports Arena, Poole, Dorset, England, UK	
127	Win	104–17–4 (2)	Harry Staal	PTS	12	Jul 6, 1937	36 years, 206 days	Working Men's Club, Llanelli, Wales, UK	
126	Win	103–17–4 (2)	Presidio Pavesi	DQ	7 (12)	Apr 5, 1937	36 years, 114 days	Colston Hall, Bristol, Avon, England, UK	
125	Win	102–17–4 (2)	Alex Bell	TKO	6 (12)	Feb 25, 1937	36 years, 75 days	West Ham Baths, West Ham, London, England, UK	
124	Win	101–17–4 (2)	Presidio Pavesi	KO	3 (10)	Dec 6, 1936	35 years, 360 days	The Ring, Southwark, London, England, UK	
123	Win	100–17–4 (2)	Emil Scholz	PTS	10	Nov 25, 1936	35 years, 349 days	White City Stadium, Hull, Yorkshire, England, UK	
122	Win	99–17–4 (2)	Eddie Steele	PTS	12	Nov 19, 1936	35 years, 343 days	West Ham Baths, West Ham, London, England, UK	
121	Win	98–17–4 (2)	Bert Ikin	KO	5 (12)	Oct 29, 1936	35 years, 322 days	West Ham Baths, West Ham, London, England, UK	
120	NC	97–17–4 (2)	Jack London	NC	8 (10)	Oct 19, 1936	35 years, 312 days	Earls Court Empress Hall, Kensington, London, England, UK	Both men considered not to be trying
119	Win	97–17–4 (1)	Harry Staal	PTS	10	Aug 3, 1936	35 years, 235 days	Athletic Ground, Cheltenham, Gloucestershire, England, UK	
118	Win	96–17–4 (1)	Emil Scholz	PTS	10	Jun 15, 1936	35 years, 186 days	Welford Road Stadium, Leicester, Leicestershire, England, UK	
117	Win	95–17–4 (1)	Maurice Strickland	PTS	10	Apr 27, 1936	35 years, 137 days	Granby Halls, Leicester, Leicestershire, England, UK	
116	Loss	94–17–4 (1)	Ben Foord	PTS	12	Mar 9, 1936	35 years, 88 days	Granby Halls, Leicester, Leicestershire, England, UK	
115	Loss	94–16–4 (1)	Ben Foord	PTS	12	Nov 25, 1935	34 years, 348 days	Granby Halls, Leicester, Leicestershire, England, UK	
114	Win	94–15–4 (1)	Obie Walker	PTS	15	Jul 20, 1935	34 years, 220 days	Welford Road Stadium, Leicester, Leicestershire, England, UK	Won world colored heavyweight title
113	Win	93–15–4 (1)	George Slack	KO	6 (10)	Apr 25, 1935	34 years, 134 days	The Stadium, Liverpool, Merseyside, England, UK	
112	Win	92–15–4 (1)	Charley Smith	KO	3 (12)	Mar 4, 1935	34 years, 82 days	Embassy Rink, Sparbrook, West Midlands, England, UK	
111	Win	91–15–4 (1)	Raymond Lepage	RTD	3 (12)	Jan 21, 1935	34 years, 40 days	Granby Halls, Leicester, Leicestershire, England, UK	
110	Loss	90–15–4 (1)	Jack Petersen	TKO	13 (15)	Sep 10, 1934	33 years, 272 days	White City Stadium, White City, London, England, UK	For Commonwealth heavyweight title
109	Win	90–14–4 (1)	Vincenz Hower	PTS	12	Apr 16, 1934	33 years, 125 days	Granby Halls, Leicester, Leicestershire, England, UK	
108	Win	89–14–4 (1)	Casimir Beszterda	KO	1 (12), 2:00	Apr 9, 1934	33 years, 118 days	Olympia, Bradford, Yorkshire, England UK	
107	Win	88–14–4 (1)	Harry Crossley	KO	5 (12)	Mar 26, 1934	33 years, 104 days	Granby Halls, Leicester, Leicestershire, England, UK	
106	Win	87–14–4 (1)	Ernst Guehring	KO	7 (15)	Mar 5, 1934	33 years, 83 days	Granby Halls, Leicester, Leicestershire, England, UK	
105	Loss	86–14–4 (1)	Len Harvey	PTS	15	Feb 8, 1934	33 years, 58 days	Royal Albert Hall, Kensington, London, England, UK	Lost Commonwealth heavyweight title
104	Win	86–13–4 (1)	Jack London	KO	2 (10)	Dec 11, 1933	32 years, 364 days	New St. James Hall, Newcastle, Tyne and Wear, England, UK	
103	Win	85–13–4 (1)	Piet van Gool	KO	4 (12)	Jul 8, 1933	32 years, 208 days	Windsor Park, Belfast, Northern Ireland, UK	
102	Win	84–13–4 (1)	George Cook	PTS	15	May 18, 1933	32 years, 157 days	Olympia, Kensington, London, England, UK	Retained Commonwealth heavyweight title
101	Loss	83–13–4 (1)	Don McCorkindale	KO	10 (10)	Apr 13, 1933	32 years, 122 days	Royal Albert Hall, Kensington, London, England, UK	
100	Win	83–12–4 (1)	Roberto Roberti	KO	3 (12)	Apr 3, 1933	32 years, 112 days	Granby Halls, Leicester, Leicestershire, England, UK	
99	Win	82–12–4 (1)	Reggie Meen	DQ	4 (12)	Feb 13, 1933	32 years, 63 days	Granby Halls, Leicester, Leicestershire, England, UK	
98	Win	81–12–4 (1)	Paul Hofman	RTD	6 (12)	Jan 9, 1933	32 years, 28 days	Town Hall, Leeds, Yorkshire, England, UK	
97	Win	80–12–4 (1)	Michel Maurer	KO	4 (15)	Dec 12, 1932	32 years, 0 days	King's Hall, Belle Vue, Manchester, Lancashire, England, UK	
96	Win	79–12–4 (1)	Hermann Jaspers	KO	3 (15)	Dec 4, 1932	31 years, 358 days	The Ring, Southwark, London, England, UK	
95	Win	78–12–4 (1)	Marcel Moret	KO	1 (15), 0:34	Nov 28, 1932	31 years, 352 days	Olympia, Bradford, Yorkshire, England UK	
94	Loss	77–12–4 (1)	Walter Neusel	UD	10	Oct 17, 1932	31 years, 310 days	Palais des Sports, Paris, France	
93	Win	77–11–4 (1)	Salvatore Ruggirello	PTS	12	Sep 29, 1932	31 years, 292 days	Royal Albert Hall, Kensington, London, England, UK	
92	Win	76–11–4 (1)	Primo Carnera	PTS	10	May 30, 1932	31 years, 170 days	White City Stadium, White City, London, England, UK	
91	Win	75–11–4 (1)	Don McCorkindale	PTS	15	Mar 3, 1932	31 years, 82 days	Royal Albert Hall, Kensington, London, England, UK	Retained Commonwealth heavyweight title
90	Draw	74–11–4 (1)	Don McCorkindale	PTS	15	Jan 28, 1932	31 years, 47 days	Royal Albert Hall, Kensington, London, England, UK	Retained Commonwealth heavyweight title
89	Win	74–11–3 (1)	Maurice Griselle	TKO	8 (12)	Nov 30, 1931	30 years, 353 days	Granby Halls, Leicester, Leicestershire, England, UK	
88	Win	73–11–3 (1)	Alexander Lutz	TKO	2 (15)	Nov 8, 1931	30 years, 331 days	The Ring, Southwark, London, England, UK	
87	Win	72–11–3 (1)	Søren Petersen	KO	5 (12)	Nov 2, 1931	30 years, 325 days	New Boulevard Rink, Leicester, Leicestershire, England, UK	
86	Win	71–11–3 (1)	Jack Renault	PTS	10	Sep 21, 1931	30 years, 283 days	Coliseum, Toronto, Ontario, Canada	Retained Canada heavyweight title
85	Win	70–11–3 (1)	Hans Baumann	KO	1 (15), 2:30	Jul 27, 1931	30 years, 227 days	King's Hall, Belle Vue, Manchester, Lancashire, England, UK	
84	Win	69–11–3 (1)	Phil Scott	KO	2 (15)	Jun 13, 1931	30 years, 183 days	Welford Road Stadium, Leicester, Leicestershire, England, UK	Won Commonwealth heavyweight title
83	Win	68–11–3 (1)	Piet van Gool	KO	4 (12)	May 12, 1931	30 years, 151 days	Granby Halls, Leicester, Leicestershire, England, UK	
82	Win	67–11–3 (1)	Charley Smith	KO	9 (15)	Mar 10, 1931	30 years, 88 days	Granby Halls, Leicester, Leicestershire, England, UK	
81	Win	66–11–3 (1)	Bobby Shields	TKO	3 (12)	Feb 16, 1931	30 years, 66 days	King's Hall, Belle Vue, Manchester, Lancashire, England, UK	
80	Win	65–11–3 (1)	Charley Smith	PTS	12	Dec 30, 1930	30 years, 18 days	Granby Halls, Leicester, Leicestershire, England, UK	
79	Win	64–11–3 (1)	Paul Hofman	TKO	6 (10)	Dec 15, 1930	30 years, 3 days	New Victoria Hall, Nottingham, Nottinghamshire, England, UK	
78	Win	63–11–3 (1)	Johannes van Vliet	KO	2 (12)	Nov 25, 1930	29 years, 348 days	Granby Halls, Leicester, Leicestershire, England, UK	
77	Win	62–11–3 (1)	Georges Gardebois	KO	7 (10)	Oct 31, 1930	29 years, 323 days	Rheinlandhalle, Cologne, Weimar Republic	
76	Win	61–11–3 (1)	Jean Delarge	KO	2 (12)	Oct 23, 1930	29 years, 315 days	Liverpool Stadium, Liverpool, Merseyside, England, UK	
75	Win	60–11–3 (1)	Roberto Roberti	PTS	10	May 18, 1930	29 years, 157 days	Campo di Marte, Lucca, Italy	
74	Win	59–11–3 (1)	Epifanio Islas	KO	8 (?)	Apr 6, 1930	29 years, 115 days	Florence, Italy	
73	Win	58–11–3 (1)	Rudi Wagener	TKO	6 (8)	Apr 6, 1930	29 years, 115 days	Westfalenhalle, Dortmund, Weimar Republic	
72	Win	57–11–3 (1)	Hans Schönrath	PTS	8	Mar 25, 1930	29 years, 103 days	Rheinlandhalle, Cologne, Weimar Republic	
71	Win	56–11–3 (1)	Roberto Roberti	PTS	10	Mar 16, 1930	29 years, 94 days	Palazzo dello Sport (Pad. 3 Fiera), Milan, Italy	
70	Win	55–11–3 (1)	Jules Reynders	KO	3 (12)	Jan 16, 1930	29 years, 35 days	Liverpool Stadium, Liverpool, Merseyside, England, UK	
69	Win	54–11–3 (1)	Don Shortland	DQ	8 (15)	Dec 12, 1929	29 years, 0 days	Liverpool Stadium, Liverpool, Merseyside, England, UK	
68	Win	53–11–3 (1)	Giacomo Panfilo	TKO	2 (?)	Dec 8, 1929	28 years, 361 days	Palazzo dello Sport (Pad. 3 Fiera), Milan, Italy	
67	Win	52–11–3 (1)	Harry Crossley	PTS	10	Nov 2, 1929	28 years, 325 days	Rheinlandhalle, Cologne, Weimar Republic	
66	Win	51–11–3 (1)	Joe Mullings	KO	3 (12)	Oct 17, 1929	28 years, 309 days	Liverpool Stadium, Liverpool, Merseyside, England, UK	
65	Win	50–11–3 (1)	Carl Augustine	KO	2 (10)	Jun 4, 1929	28 years, 174 days	Amphitheatre Rink, Winnipeg, Manitoba, Canada	
64	Win	49–11–3 (1)	George Cook	PTS	10	Apr 15, 1929	28 years, 124 days	Coliseum, Toronto, Ontario, Canada	
63	Loss	48–11–3 (1)	Chuck Wiggins	PTS	10	Mar 11, 1929	28 years, 89 days	Broadway Auditorium, Buffalo, New York, US	
62	Win	48–10–3 (1)	Nick Newman	KO	1 (10), 1:55	Feb 25, 1929	28 years, 75 days	Broadway Auditorium, Buffalo, New York, US	
61	Win	47–10–3 (1)	Charley Belanger	PTS	10	Jan 25, 1929	28 years, 44 days	Coliseum, Toronto, Ontario, Canada	Retained Canada heavyweight title
60	Win	46–10–3 (1)	Seal Harris	NWS	10	Dec 20, 1928	28 years, 8 days	Cadle Tabernacle, Indianapolis, Indiana, US	World colored heavyweight title at stake; (via KO only)
59	Win	46–10–3	Pat McCarthy	PTS	10	Oct 22, 1928	27 years, 315 days	Broadway Auditorium, Buffalo, New York, US	
58	Win	45–10–3	George Godfrey	DQ	3 (10), 1:20	Aug 15, 1928	27 years, 247 days	Maple Leaf Stadium, Toronto, Ontario, Canada	Won world colored heavyweight title; Godfrey DQ'd for a low blow
57	Win	44–10–3	Jack Gagnon	PTS	10	Jun 18, 1928	27 years, 189 days	Braves Field, Boston, Massachusetts, US	
56	Loss	43–10–3	Bill Hartwell	TKO	6 (10)	Jun 8, 1928	27 years, 179 days	Kansas City, Missouri, US	
55	Win	43–9–3	Tom Kirby	PTS	10	May 29, 1928	27 years, 169 days	Braves Field, Boston, Massachusetts, US	
54	Win	42–9–3	Sandy Seifert	TKO	6 (10)	May 18, 1928	27 years, 158 days	Arena Gardens, Toronto, Ontario, Canada	
53	Win	41–9–3	Big Boy Peterson	PTS	10	Apr 2, 1928	27 years, 112 days	Broadway Auditorium, Buffalo, New York, US	
52	Win	40–9–3	Art Weigand	PTS	6	Mar 19, 1928	27 years, 98 days	Broadway Auditorium, Buffalo, New York, US	
51	Win	39–9–3	Pat McCarthy	UD	10	Feb 20, 1928	27 years, 70 days	Coliseum, Toronto, Ontario, Canada	
50	Win	38–9–3	Jack Humbeeck	PTS	10	Jan 13, 1928	27 years, 32 days	Coliseum, Toronto, Ontario, Canada	
49	Draw	37–9–3	Mike McTigue	PTS	10	Nov 11, 1927	26 years, 334 days	Coliseum, Toronto, Ontario, Canada	
48	Win	37–9–2	Joe Lohman	PTS	10	Oct 3, 1927	26 years, 295 days	Maple Leaf Stadium, Toronto, Ontario, Canada	
47	Win	36–9–2	Martin Burke	PTS	10	Aug 19, 1927	26 years, 250 days	Maple Leaf Stadium, Toronto, Ontario, Canada	
46	Win	35–9–2	Emilio Solomon	PTS	10	Aug 5, 1927	26 years, 236 days	Maple Leaf Stadium, Toronto, Ontario, Canada	
45	Loss	34–9–2	Martin Burke	PTS	10	Jul 28, 1927	26 years, 228 days	Madison Square Garden, New York City, New York, US	
44	Win	34–8–2	Tony Stabenau	PTS	10	May 20, 1927	26 years, 159 days	Arena Gardens, Toronto, Ontario, Canada	
43	Win	33–8–2	Ray Neuman	PTS	10	Apr 29, 1927	26 years, 138 days	Arena Gardens, Toronto, Ontario, Canada	
42	Win	32–8–2	Quintin Romero Rojas	PTS	10	Mar 18, 1927	26 years, 96 days	Coliseum, Toronto, Ontario, Canada	
41	Win	31–8–2	Soldier Jones	TKO	5 (10), 0:30	Feb 28, 1927	26 years, 78 days	Coliseum, Toronto, Ontario, Canada	Won Canada heavyweight title
40	Win	30–8–2	Joe Burke	KO	3 (10), 0:30	Jan 24, 1927	26 years, 43 days	Standard Theatre, Toronto, Ontario, Canada	
39	Loss	29–8–2	George Godfrey	RTD	6 (10), 3:00	Nov 8, 1926	25 years, 331 days	Broadway Auditorium, Buffalo, New York, US	For vacant world colored heavyweight title
38	Win	29–7–2	Tony Stabenau	PTS	10	Jun 21, 1926	25 years, 191 days	Broadway Auditorium, Buffalo, New York, US	
37	Win	28–7–2	Bud Gorman	PTS	10	May 14, 1926	25 years, 153 days	Arena Gardens, Toronto, Ontario, Canada	
36	Win	27–7–2	Dixie Kid	KO	2 (10)	Apr 12, 1926	25 years, 121 days	Arena Gardens, Toronto, Ontario, Canada	
35	Win	26–7–2	Ernst Roesemann	TKO	3 (10)	Feb 12, 1926	25 years, 62 days	Kaiserdamm Arena, Weimar Republic	
34	Win	25–7–2	Louis Clement	KO	2 (10)	Feb 1, 1926	25 years, 51 days	Schumann Theater, Frankfurt, Weimar Republic	
33	Win	24–7–2	Ludwig Haymann	PTS	10	Dec 15, 1925	25 years, 3 days	Frankfurt, Weimar Republic	
32	Win	23–7–2	Louis Clement	TKO	6 (10)	Oct 16, 1925	24 years, 308 days	Bickendorfer Festhalle, Cologne, Weimar Republic	
31	Win	22–7–2	Max Schmeling	KO	2 (10)	Aug 28, 1925	24 years, 259 days	Kristallpalast, Cologne, Weimar Republic	
30	Win	21–7–2	Eugene Lallemand	KO	2 (10)	May 22, 1925	24 years, 161 days	Stadthalle, Elberfeld, Weimar Republic	
29	Draw	20–7–2	Ludwig Haymann	PTS	10	Apr 3, 1925	24 years, 112 days	Sportpalast, Weimar Republic	
28	Win	20–7–1	Rudi Wagener	DQ	9 (10)	Mar 20, 1925	24 years, 98 days	Bickendorfer Festhalle, Cologne, Weimar Republic	
27	Win	19–7–1	Heinz Marko	KO	2 (10)	Feb 13, 1925	24 years, 63 days	Bickendorfer Festhalle, Cologne, Weimar Republic	
26	Win	18–7–1	Joe Mehling	PTS	10	Jan 18, 1925	24 years, 37 days	Schauburgring, Cologne, Weimar Republic	
25	Loss	17–7–1	George Cook	PTS	10	Dec 6, 1924	23 years, 360 days	Jahrhunderthalle, Wroclaw, Poland	
24	Loss	17–6–1	Harry Persson	KO	2 (15)	Oct 31, 1924	23 years, 324 days	Cirkus, Stockholm, Sweden	
23	Win	17–5–1	Franz Diener	KO	10 (10)	Oct 4, 1924	23 years, 297 days	Hippodrom, Frankfurt, Weimar Republic	
22	Win	16–5–1	Herman Sjouwerman	TKO	5 (?)	Sep 14, 1924	23 years, 277 days	Cologne, Weimar Republic	
21	Win	15–5–1	Laurent Mahieu	TKO	3 (10)	Aug 30, 1924	23 years, 262 days	Bickendorfer Festhalle, Cologne, Weimar Republic	
20	Win	14–5–1	Alf Bright	PTS	10	Aug 17, 1924	23 years, 249 days	Bickendorfer Festhalle, Cologne, Weimar Republic	
19	Win	13–5–1	Bertus Ahaus	TKO	2 (10)	Jul 13, 1924	23 years, 214 days	Wielerbaan, Rotterdam, Netherlands	
18	Win	12–5–1	Giuseppe Spalla	PTS	10	Jun 5, 1924	23 years, 176 days	Radrennbahn im Stadium, Cologne, Weimar Republic	
17	Win	11–5–1	Michael Stein	PTS	10	May 11, 1924	23 years, 151 days	Alberthalle, Leipzig, Weimar Republic	
16	Win	10–5–1	Max Dähling	PTS	10	Apr 15, 1924	23 years, 125 days	Zentralhallen, Bremen, Weimar Republic	
15	Loss	9–5–1	Hans Breitensträter	KO	3 (12)	Apr 14, 1924	23 years, 124 days	Bickendorfer Festhalle, Cologne, Weimar Republic	
14	Win	9–4–1	Tom Ireland	KO	1 (10)	Mar 21, 1924	23 years, 100 days	Zentralhallen, Bremen, Weimar Republic	
13	Win	8–4–1	Paul Journee	PTS	10	Feb 27, 1924	23 years, 77 days	Cirque de Paris, Paris, France	
12	Loss	7–4–1	Marcel Nilles	KO	3 (12)	Feb 13, 1924	23 years, 63 days	Cirque de Paris, Paris, France	
11	Draw	7–3–1	Michael Kompa Stein	PTS	10	Jan 6, 1924	23 years, 25 days	Kristallpalast, Cologne, Weimar Republic	
10	Win	7–3	Constant Barrick	PTS	10	Dec 19, 1923	23 years, 7 days	Palais d'Hiver, Lyon, France	
9	Win	6–3	Laurent Mahieu	KO	2 (?)	Dec 5, 1923	22 years, 358 days	Salle Wagram, Paris, France	
8	Loss	5–3	Jack Humbeeck	PTS	12	Oct 16, 1923	22 years, 308 days	Rubenspaleis, Antwerpen, Belgium	
7	Win	5–2	Pierre Charles	KO	1 (10)	Oct 3, 1923	22 years, 295 days	Salle Wagram, Paris, France	
6	Loss	4–2	Quintin Romero Rojas	KO	11 (12)	Sep 5, 1923	22 years, 267 days	Salle Wagram, Paris, France	
5	Win	4–1	Laurent Mahieu	KO	2 (?)	Aug 25, 1923	22 years, 256 days	Stade Anastasie, Paris, France	
4	Win	3–1	Paul Journee	PTS	15	Aug 15, 1923	22 years, 246 days	Vélodrome Tivoli, Bourges, France	
3	Win	2–1	Pierre Aussenac	KO	3 (?)	Aug 11, 1923	22 years, 242 days	Stade Anastasie, Paris, France	
2	Win	1–1	Louis Danis	TKO	3 (10)	Aug 5, 1923	22 years, 236 days	Stade Anastasie, Paris, France	
1	Loss	0–1	Frank Moody	TKO	5 (15)	Jun 23, 1923	22 years, 193 days	The Ring, Southwark, London, England, UK	

=== Unofficial record ===
146 fights	118 wins	22 losses
By knockout	63	14
By decision	50	8
By disqualification	5	0
Draws	5	
No contests	1	

Record with the inclusion of newspaper decisions in the win/loss/draw column.

No.	Result	Record	Opponent	Type	Round, time	Date	Age	Location	Notes
146	Loss	118–22–5 (1)	Jack London	KO	2 (10)	Jun 6, 1942	41 years, 176 days	Caird Hall, Dundee, Scotland, UK	
145	Loss	118–21–5 (1)	Jack London	KO	3 (10)	May 28, 1941	40 years, 167 days	New St. James Hall, Newcastle, Tyne and Wear, England, UK	
144	Win	118–20–5 (1)	Sergeant Elemett	TKO	2 (?)	Feb 19, 1941	40 years, 69 days	Location unknown	
143	Loss	117–20–5 (1)	Jack London	KO	4 (10)	Jan 25, 1941	40 years, 44 days	The Stadium, Liverpool, Merseyside, England, UK	
142	Win	117–19–5 (1)	George James	PTS	4	Feb 12, 1940	39 years, 62 days	Aldershot, Hampshire, England, UK	
141	Loss	116–19–5 (1)	Tommy Farr	TKO	6 (10)	May 17, 1939	38 years, 156 days	Ninian Park, Cardiff, Wales, UK	
140	Loss	116–18–5 (1)	Len Harvey	TKO	13 (15)	Mar 16, 1939	38 years, 94 days	Harringay Arena, London, England, UK	For vacant Commonwealth heavyweight title
139	Win	116–17–5 (1)	George James	PTS	12	Dec 12, 1938	38 years, 0 days	Pavilion, Mountain Ash, Wales, UK	
138	Draw	115–17–5 (1)	Claudio Villar	PTS	12	Oct 14, 1938	37 years, 306 days	Waverley Market, Edinburgh, Scotland, UK	
137	Win	115–17–4 (1)	Harry Staal	PTS	10	Aug 23, 1938	37 years, 254 days	St. Helier Stadium, Jersey, Channel Islands, UK	
136	Win	114–17–4 (1)	Pat Marrinan	PTS	12	Mar 10, 1938	37 years, 88 days	Romford Road Baths, West Ham, London, England, UK	
135	Win	113–17–4 (1)	Albert Di Meglio	KO	1 (?)	Feb 21, 1938	37 years, 71 days	Sheffield, Yorkshire, England, UK	
134	Win	112–17–4 (1)	Bill Wainwright	KO	3 (10)	Jan 17, 1938	37 years, 36 days	Sheffield, Yorkshire, England, UK	Uncertain if this is Bill Wainwright
133	Win	111–17–4 (1)	Presidio Pavesi	KO	2 (12)	Jan 9, 1938	37 years, 28 days	The Ring, Southwark, London, England, UK	
132	Win	110–17–4 (1)	Pinkie Jenkins	KO	3 (?)	Dec 14, 1937	37 years, 2 days	Swansea, Wales, UK	
131	Win	109–17–4 (1)	Jack Pettifer	KO	2 (10), 0:20	Dec 9, 1937	36 years, 362 days	Romford Road Baths, West Ham, London, England, UK	
130	Win	108–17–4 (1)	Hans Schönrath	PTS	10	Nov 2, 1937	36 years, 325 days	Granby Halls, Leicester, Leicestershire, England, UK	
129	Win	107–17–4 (1)	Charles Rutz	KO	2 (10)	Oct 4, 1937	36 years, 296 days	Earls Court Empress Stadium, Kensington, London, England, UK	
128	Win	106–17–4 (1)	Bert Ikin	KO	1 (10)	Aug 14, 1937	36 years, 245 days	Poole Sports Arena, Poole, Dorset, England, UK	
127	Win	105–17–4 (1)	Harry Staal	PTS	12	Jul 6, 1937	36 years, 206 days	Working Men's Club, Llanelli, Wales, UK	
126	Win	104–17–4 (1)	Presidio Pavesi	DQ	7 (12)	Apr 5, 1937	36 years, 114 days	Colston Hall, Bristol, Avon, England, UK	
125	Win	103–17–4 (1)	Alex Bell	TKO	6 (12)	Feb 25, 1937	36 years, 75 days	West Ham Baths, West Ham, London, England, UK	
124	Win	102–17–4 (1)	Presidio Pavesi	KO	3 (10)	Dec 6, 1936	35 years, 360 days	The Ring, Southwark, London, England, UK	
123	Win	101–17–4 (1)	Emil Scholz	PTS	10	Nov 25, 1936	35 years, 349 days	White City Stadium, Hull, Yorkshire, England, UK	
122	Win	100–17–4 (1)	Eddie Steele	PTS	12	Nov 19, 1936	35 years, 343 days	West Ham Baths, West Ham, London, England, UK	
121	Win	99–17–4 (1)	Bert Ikin	KO	5 (12)	Oct 29, 1936	35 years, 322 days	West Ham Baths, West Ham, London, England, UK	
120	NC	98–17–4 (1)	Jack London	NC	8 (10)	Oct 19, 1936	35 years, 312 days	Earls Court Empress Hall, Kensington, London, England, UK	Both men considered not to be trying
119	Win	98–17–4	Harry Staal	PTS	10	Aug 3, 1936	35 years, 235 days	Athletic Ground, Cheltenham, Gloucestershire, England, UK	
118	Win	97–17–4	Emil Scholz	PTS	10	Jun 15, 1936	35 years, 186 days	Welford Road Stadium, Leicester, Leicestershire, England, UK	
117	Win	96–17–4	Maurice Strickland	PTS	10	Apr 27, 1936	35 years, 137 days	Granby Halls, Leicester, Leicestershire, England, UK	
116	Loss	95–17–4	Ben Foord	PTS	12	Mar 9, 1936	35 years, 88 days	Granby Halls, Leicester, Leicestershire, England, UK	
115	Loss	95–16–4	Ben Foord	PTS	12	Nov 25, 1935	34 years, 348 days	Granby Halls, Leicester, Leicestershire, England, UK	
114	Win	95–15–4	Obie Walker	PTS	15	Jul 20, 1935	34 years, 220 days	Welford Road Stadium, Leicester, Leicestershire, England, UK	Won world colored heavyweight title
113	Win	94–15–4	George Slack	KO	6 (10)	Apr 25, 1935	34 years, 134 days	The Stadium, Liverpool, Merseyside, England, UK	
112	Win	93–15–4	Charley Smith	KO	3 (12)	Mar 4, 1935	34 years, 82 days	Embassy Rink, Sparbrook, West Midlands, England, UK	
111	Win	92–15–4	Raymond Lepage	RTD	3 (12)	Jan 21, 1935	34 years, 40 days	Granby Halls, Leicester, Leicestershire, England, UK	
110	Loss	91–15–4	Jack Petersen	TKO	13 (15)	Sep 10, 1934	33 years, 272 days	White City Stadium, White City, London, England, UK	For Commonwealth heavyweight title
109	Win	91–14–4	Vincenz Hower	PTS	12	Apr 16, 1934	33 years, 125 days	Granby Halls, Leicester, Leicestershire, England, UK	
108	Win	90–14–4	Casimir Beszterda	KO	1 (12), 2:00	Apr 9, 1934	33 years, 118 days	Olympia, Bradford, Yorkshire, England UK	
107	Win	89–14–4	Harry Crossley	KO	5 (12)	Mar 26, 1934	33 years, 104 days	Granby Halls, Leicester, Leicestershire, England, UK	
106	Win	88–14–4	Ernst Guehring	KO	7 (15)	Mar 5, 1934	33 years, 83 days	Granby Halls, Leicester, Leicestershire, England, UK	
105	Loss	87–14–4	Len Harvey	PTS	15	Feb 8, 1934	33 years, 58 days	Royal Albert Hall, Kensington, London, England, UK	Lost Commonwealth heavyweight title
104	Win	87–13–4	Jack London	KO	2 (10)	Dec 11, 1933	32 years, 364 days	New St. James Hall, Newcastle, Tyne and Wear, England, UK	
103	Win	86–13–4	Piet van Gool	KO	4 (12)	Jul 8, 1933	32 years, 208 days	Windsor Park, Belfast, Northern Ireland, UK	
102	Win	85–13–4	George Cook	PTS	15	May 18, 1933	32 years, 157 days	Olympia, Kensington, London, England, UK	Retained Commonwealth heavyweight title
101	Loss	84–13–4	Don McCorkindale	KO	10 (10)	Apr 13, 1933	32 years, 122 days	Royal Albert Hall, Kensington, London, England, UK	
100	Win	84–12–4	Roberto Roberti	KO	3 (12)	Apr 3, 1933	32 years, 112 days	Granby Halls, Leicester, Leicestershire, England, UK	
99	Win	83–12–4	Reggie Meen	DQ	4 (12)	Feb 13, 1933	32 years, 63 days	Granby Halls, Leicester, Leicestershire, England, UK	
98	Win	82–12–4	Paul Hofman	RTD	6 (12)	Jan 9, 1933	32 years, 28 days	Town Hall, Leeds, Yorkshire, England, UK	
97	Win	81–12–4	Michel Maurer	KO	4 (15)	Dec 12, 1932	32 years, 0 days	King's Hall, Belle Vue, Manchester, Lancashire, England, UK	
96	Win	80–12–4	Hermann Jaspers	KO	3 (15)	Dec 4, 1932	31 years, 358 days	The Ring, Southwark, London, England, UK	
95	Win	79–12–4	Marcel Moret	KO	1 (15), 0:34	Nov 28, 1932	31 years, 352 days	Olympia, Bradford, Yorkshire, England UK	
94	Loss	78–12–4	Walter Neusel	UD	10	Oct 17, 1932	31 years, 310 days	Palais des Sports, Paris, France	
93	Win	78–11–4	Salvatore Ruggirello	PTS	12	Sep 29, 1932	31 years, 292 days	Royal Albert Hall, Kensington, London, England, UK	
92	Win	77–11–4	Primo Carnera	PTS	10	May 30, 1932	31 years, 170 days	White City Stadium, White City, London, England, UK	
91	Win	76–11–4	Don McCorkindale	PTS	15	Mar 3, 1932	31 years, 82 days	Royal Albert Hall, Kensington, London, England, UK	Retained Commonwealth heavyweight title
90	Draw	75–11–4	Don McCorkindale	PTS	15	Jan 28, 1932	31 years, 47 days	Royal Albert Hall, Kensington, London, England, UK	Retained Commonwealth heavyweight title
89	Win	75–11–3	Maurice Griselle	TKO	8 (12)	Nov 30, 1931	30 years, 353 days	Granby Halls, Leicester, Leicestershire, England, UK	
88	Win	74–11–3	Alexander Lutz	TKO	2 (15)	Nov 8, 1931	30 years, 331 days	The Ring, Southwark, London, England, UK	
87	Win	73–11–3	Søren Petersen	KO	5 (12)	Nov 2, 1931	30 years, 325 days	New Boulevard Rink, Leicester, Leicestershire, England, UK	
86	Win	72–11–3	Jack Renault	PTS	10	Sep 21, 1931	30 years, 283 days	Coliseum, Toronto, Ontario, Canada	Retained Canada heavyweight title
85	Win	71–11–3	Hans Baumann	KO	1 (15), 2:30	Jul 27, 1931	30 years, 227 days	King's Hall, Belle Vue, Manchester, Lancashire, England, UK	
84	Win	70–11–3	Phil Scott	KO	2 (15)	Jun 13, 1931	30 years, 183 days	Welford Road Stadium, Leicester, Leicestershire, England, UK	Won Commonwealth heavyweight title
83	Win	69–11–3	Piet van Gool	KO	4 (12)	May 12, 1931	30 years, 151 days	Granby Halls, Leicester, Leicestershire, England, UK	
82	Win	68–11–3	Charley Smith	KO	9 (15)	Mar 10, 1931	30 years, 88 days	Granby Halls, Leicester, Leicestershire, England, UK	
81	Win	67–11–3	Bobby Shields	TKO	3 (12)	Feb 16, 1931	30 years, 66 days	King's Hall, Belle Vue, Manchester, Lancashire, England, UK	
80	Win	66–11–3	Charley Smith	PTS	12	Dec 30, 1930	30 years, 18 days	Granby Halls, Leicester, Leicestershire, England, UK	
79	Win	65–11–3	Paul Hofman	TKO	6 (10)	Dec 15, 1930	30 years, 3 days	New Victoria Hall, Nottingham, Nottinghamshire, England, UK	
78	Win	64–11–3	Johannes van Vliet	KO	2 (12)	Nov 25, 1930	29 years, 348 days	Granby Halls, Leicester, Leicestershire, England, UK	
77	Win	63–11–3	Georges Gardebois	KO	7 (10)	Oct 31, 1930	29 years, 323 days	Rheinlandhalle, Cologne, Weimar Republic	
76	Win	62–11–3	Jean Delarge	KO	2 (12)	Oct 23, 1930	29 years, 315 days	Liverpool Stadium, Liverpool, Merseyside, England, UK	
75	Win	61–11–3	Roberto Roberti	PTS	10	May 18, 1930	29 years, 157 days	Campo di Marte, Lucca, Italy	
74	Win	60–11–3	Epifanio Islas	KO	8 (?)	Apr 6, 1930	29 years, 115 days	Florence, Italy	
73	Win	59–11–3	Rudi Wagener	TKO	6 (8)	Apr 6, 1930	29 years, 115 days	Westfalenhalle, Dortmund, Weimar Republic	
72	Win	58–11–3	Hans Schönrath	PTS	8	Mar 25, 1930	29 years, 103 days	Rheinlandhalle, Cologne, Weimar Republic	
71	Win	57–11–3	Roberto Roberti	PTS	10	Mar 16, 1930	29 years, 94 days	Palazzo dello Sport (Pad. 3 Fiera), Milan, Italy	
70	Win	56–11–3	Jules Reynders	KO	3 (12)	Jan 16, 1930	29 years, 35 days	Liverpool Stadium, Liverpool, Merseyside, England, UK	
69	Win	55–11–3	Don Shortland	DQ	8 (15)	Dec 12, 1929	29 years, 0 days	Liverpool Stadium, Liverpool, Merseyside, England, UK	
68	Win	54–11–3	Giacomo Panfilo	TKO	2 (?)	Dec 8, 1929	28 years, 361 days	Palazzo dello Sport (Pad. 3 Fiera), Milan, Italy	
67	Win	53–11–3	Harry Crossley	PTS	10	Nov 2, 1929	28 years, 325 days	Rheinlandhalle, Cologne, Weimar Republic	
66	Win	52–11–3	Joe Mullings	KO	3 (12)	Oct 17, 1929	28 years, 309 days	Liverpool Stadium, Liverpool, Merseyside, England, UK	
65	Win	51–11–3	Carl Augustine	KO	2 (10)	Jun 4, 1929	28 years, 174 days	Amphitheatre Rink, Winnipeg, Manitoba, Canada	
64	Win	50–11–3	George Cook	PTS	10	Apr 15, 1929	28 years, 124 days	Coliseum, Toronto, Ontario, Canada	
63	Loss	49–11–3	Chuck Wiggins	PTS	10	Mar 11, 1929	28 years, 89 days	Broadway Auditorium, Buffalo, New York, US	
62	Win	49–10–3	Nick Newman	KO	1 (10), 1:55	Feb 25, 1929	28 years, 75 days	Broadway Auditorium, Buffalo, New York, US	
61	Win	48–10–3	Charley Belanger	PTS	10	Jan 25, 1929	28 years, 44 days	Coliseum, Toronto, Ontario, Canada	Retained Canada heavyweight title
60	Win	47–10–3	Seal Harris	NWS	10	Dec 20, 1928	28 years, 8 days	Cadle Tabernacle, Indianapolis, Indiana, US	World colored heavyweight title at stake; (via KO only)
59	Win	46–10–3	Pat McCarthy	PTS	10	Oct 22, 1928	27 years, 315 days	Broadway Auditorium, Buffalo, New York, US	
58	Win	45–10–3	George Godfrey	DQ	3 (10), 1:20	Aug 15, 1928	27 years, 247 days	Maple Leaf Stadium, Toronto, Ontario, Canada	Won world colored heavyweight title; Godfrey DQ'd for a low blow
57	Win	44–10–3	Jack Gagnon	PTS	10	Jun 18, 1928	27 years, 189 days	Braves Field, Boston, Massachusetts, US	
56	Loss	43–10–3	Bill Hartwell	TKO	6 (10)	Jun 8, 1928	27 years, 179 days	Kansas City, Missouri, US	
55	Win	43–9–3	Tom Kirby	PTS	10	May 29, 1928	27 years, 169 days	Braves Field, Boston, Massachusetts, US	
54	Win	42–9–3	Sandy Seifert	TKO	6 (10)	May 18, 1928	27 years, 158 days	Arena Gardens, Toronto, Ontario, Canada	
53	Win	41–9–3	Big Boy Peterson	PTS	10	Apr 2, 1928	27 years, 112 days	Broadway Auditorium, Buffalo, New York, US	
52	Win	40–9–3	Art Weigand	PTS	6	Mar 19, 1928	27 years, 98 days	Broadway Auditorium, Buffalo, New York, US	
51	Win	39–9–3	Pat McCarthy	UD	10	Feb 20, 1928	27 years, 70 days	Coliseum, Toronto, Ontario, Canada	
50	Win	38–9–3	Jack Humbeeck	PTS	10	Jan 13, 1928	27 years, 32 days	Coliseum, Toronto, Ontario, Canada	
49	Draw	37–9–3	Mike McTigue	PTS	10	Nov 11, 1927	26 years, 334 days	Coliseum, Toronto, Ontario, Canada	
48	Win	37–9–2	Joe Lohman	PTS	10	Oct 3, 1927	26 years, 295 days	Maple Leaf Stadium, Toronto, Ontario, Canada	
47	Win	36–9–2	Martin Burke	PTS	10	Aug 19, 1927	26 years, 250 days	Maple Leaf Stadium, Toronto, Ontario, Canada	
46	Win	35–9–2	Emilio Solomon	PTS	10	Aug 5, 1927	26 years, 236 days	Maple Leaf Stadium, Toronto, Ontario, Canada	
45	Loss	34–9–2	Martin Burke	PTS	10	Jul 28, 1927	26 years, 228 days	Madison Square Garden, New York City, New York, US	
44	Win	34–8–2	Tony Stabenau	PTS	10	May 20, 1927	26 years, 159 days	Arena Gardens, Toronto, Ontario, Canada	
43	Win	33–8–2	Ray Neuman	PTS	10	Apr 29, 1927	26 years, 138 days	Arena Gardens, Toronto, Ontario, Canada	
42	Win	32–8–2	Quintin Romero Rojas	PTS	10	Mar 18, 1927	26 years, 96 days	Coliseum, Toronto, Ontario, Canada	
41	Win	31–8–2	Soldier Jones	TKO	5 (10), 0:30	Feb 28, 1927	26 years, 78 days	Coliseum, Toronto, Ontario, Canada	Won Canada heavyweight title
40	Win	30–8–2	Joe Burke	KO	3 (10), 0:30	Jan 24, 1927	26 years, 43 days	Standard Theatre, Toronto, Ontario, Canada	
39	Loss	29–8–2	George Godfrey	RTD	6 (10), 3:00	Nov 8, 1926	25 years, 331 days	Broadway Auditorium, Buffalo, New York, US	For vacant world colored heavyweight title
38	Win	29–7–2	Tony Stabenau	PTS	10	Jun 21, 1926	25 years, 191 days	Broadway Auditorium, Buffalo, New York, US	
37	Win	28–7–2	Bud Gorman	PTS	10	May 14, 1926	25 years, 153 days	Arena Gardens, Toronto, Ontario, Canada	
36	Win	27–7–2	Dixie Kid	KO	2 (10)	Apr 12, 1926	25 years, 121 days	Arena Gardens, Toronto, Ontario, Canada	
35	Win	26–7–2	Ernst Roesemann	TKO	3 (10)	Feb 12, 1926	25 years, 62 days	Kaiserdamm Arena, Weimar Republic	
34	Win	25–7–2	Louis Clement	KO	2 (10)	Feb 1, 1926	25 years, 51 days	Schumann Theater, Frankfurt, Weimar Republic	
33	Win	24–7–2	Ludwig Haymann	PTS	10	Dec 15, 1925	25 years, 3 days	Frankfurt, Weimar Republic	
32	Win	23–7–2	Louis Clement	TKO	6 (10)	Oct 16, 1925	24 years, 308 days	Bickendorfer Festhalle, Cologne, Weimar Republic	
31	Win	22–7–2	Max Schmeling	KO	2 (10)	Aug 28, 1925	24 years, 259 days	Kristallpalast, Cologne, Weimar Republic	
30	Win	21–7–2	Eugene Lallemand	KO	2 (10)	May 22, 1925	24 years, 161 days	Stadthalle, Elberfeld, Weimar Republic	
29	Draw	20–7–2	Ludwig Haymann	PTS	10	Apr 3, 1925	24 years, 112 days	Sportpalast, Weimar Republic	
28	Win	20–7–1	Rudi Wagener	DQ	9 (10)	Mar 20, 1925	24 years, 98 days	Bickendorfer Festhalle, Cologne, Weimar Republic	
27	Win	19–7–1	Heinz Marko	KO	2 (10)	Feb 13, 1925	24 years, 63 days	Bickendorfer Festhalle, Cologne, Weimar Republic	
26	Win	18–7–1	Joe Mehling	PTS	10	Jan 18, 1925	24 years, 37 days	Schauburgring, Cologne, Weimar Republic	
25	Loss	17–7–1	George Cook	PTS	10	Dec 6, 1924	23 years, 360 days	Jahrhunderthalle, Wroclaw, Poland	
24	Loss	17–6–1	Harry Persson	KO	2 (15)	Oct 31, 1924	23 years, 324 days	Cirkus, Stockholm, Sweden	
23	Win	17–5–1	Franz Diener	KO	10 (10)	Oct 4, 1924	23 years, 297 days	Hippodrom, Frankfurt, Weimar Republic	
22	Win	16–5–1	Herman Sjouwerman	TKO	5 (?)	Sep 14, 1924	23 years, 277 days	Cologne, Weimar Republic	
21	Win	15–5–1	Laurent Mahieu	TKO	3 (10)	Aug 30, 1924	23 years, 262 days	Bickendorfer Festhalle, Cologne, Weimar Republic	
20	Win	14–5–1	Alf Bright	PTS	10	Aug 17, 1924	23 years, 249 days	Bickendorfer Festhalle, Cologne, Weimar Republic	
19	Win	13–5–1	Bertus Ahaus	TKO	2 (10)	Jul 13, 1924	23 years, 214 days	Wielerbaan, Rotterdam, Netherlands	
18	Win	12–5–1	Giuseppe Spalla	PTS	10	Jun 5, 1924	23 years, 176 days	Radrennbahn im Stadium, Cologne, Weimar Republic	
17	Win	11–5–1	Michael Stein	PTS	10	May 11, 1924	23 years, 151 days	Alberthalle, Leipzig, Weimar Republic	
16	Win	10–5–1	Max Dähling	PTS	10	Apr 15, 1924	23 years, 125 days	Zentralhallen, Bremen, Weimar Republic	
15	Loss	9–5–1	Hans Breitensträter	KO	3 (12)	Apr 14, 1924	23 years, 124 days	Bickendorfer Festhalle, Cologne, Weimar Republic	
14	Win	9–4–1	Tom Ireland	KO	1 (10)	Mar 21, 1924	23 years, 100 days	Zentralhallen, Bremen, Weimar Republic	
13	Win	8–4–1	Paul Journee	PTS	10	Feb 27, 1924	23 years, 77 days	Cirque de Paris, Paris, France	
12	Loss	7–4–1	Marcel Nilles	KO	3 (12)	Feb 13, 1924	23 years, 63 days	Cirque de Paris, Paris, France	
11	Draw	7–3–1	Michael Kompa Stein	PTS	10	Jan 6, 1924	23 years, 25 days	Kristallpalast, Cologne, Weimar Republic	
10	Win	7–3	Constant Barrick	PTS	10	Dec 19, 1923	23 years, 7 days	Palais d'Hiver, Lyon, France	
9	Win	6–3	Laurent Mahieu	KO	2 (?)	Dec 5, 1923	22 years, 358 days	Salle Wagram, Paris, France	
8	Loss	5–3	Jack Humbeeck	PTS	12	Oct 16, 1923	22 years, 308 days	Rubenspaleis, Antwerpen, Belgium	
7	Win	5–2	Pierre Charles	KO	1 (10)	Oct 3, 1923	22 years, 295 days	Salle Wagram, Paris, France	
6	Loss	4–2	Quintin Romero Rojas	KO	11 (12)	Sep 5, 1923	22 years, 267 days	Salle Wagram, Paris, France	
5	Win	4–1	Laurent Mahieu	KO	2 (?)	Aug 25, 1923	22 years, 256 days	Stade Anastasie, Paris, France	
4	Win	3–1	Paul Journee	PTS	15	Aug 15, 1923	22 years, 246 days	Vélodrome Tivoli, Bourges, France	
3	Win	2–1	Pierre Aussenac	KO	3 (?)	Aug 11, 1923	22 years, 242 days	Stade Anastasie, Paris, France	
2	Win	1–1	Louis Danis	TKO	3 (10)	Aug 5, 1923	22 years, 236 days	Stade Anastasie, Paris, France	
1	Loss	0–1	Frank Moody	TKO	5 (15)	Jun 23, 1923	22 years, 193 days	The Ring, Southwark, London, England, UK	

Achievements
Preceded by George Godfrey	World Colored Heavyweight Champion; 15 August 1928 – Unknown; Vacated	Vacant Title next held by George Godfrey
Preceded by Obie Walker	World Colored Heavyweight Champion; 20 July 1935 – June 22, 1937	Title defunct after Joe Louis wins World Heavyweight title
