= Len Harvey =

British boxer (1907–1976)

Personal information
- Nationality: British
- Born: Leonard Austen Harvey; 11 July 1907 Stoke Climsland, Kernow/Cornwall
- Died: 28 November 1976 (aged 69)
- Height: 6 ft (183 cm)
- Weight: Flyweight; Bantamweight; Featherweight; Lightweight; Welterweight; Middleweight; Light Heavyweight; Heavyweight

Boxing career
- Reach: 73 1/2 in (187 cm)

Boxing record
- Total fights: 146
- Wins: 122
- Win by KO: 57
- Losses: 14
- Draws: 10

Leonard Austen Harvey (11 July 1907 – 28 November 1976) was a British boxer. A great defensive boxer, he boxed at every weight division available at the time, from flyweight to heavyweight. He became the light-heavyweight and heavyweight champion of the British Empire, and was recognised as world light-heavyweight champion in Britain from 1939 to 1942. Harvey was inducted into the International Boxing Hall of Fame in the class of 2008.

== Early career ==
=== British middleweight champion ===
Born in Stoke Climsland, Cornwall, Len Harvey started out as a flyweight at 12. By the time he was 18 he was ready to fight for the British welterweight title. He was held to a draw though by Harry Mason on 29 April 1926. His next British title shot came 2 years later on 16 May 1929. This time at middleweight against Alex Ireland. Harvey knocked out his opponent in the seventh round to become British champion. He made six defences between 1929 and 1933. He also fought Marcel Thil of France for the world middleweight championship. He lost on points in a close decision. (Thil was stripped by the NBA for failing to make a title defence by August 15, 1933, but he remained the IBU champion).

=== British light heavyweight and heavyweight champion ===
On 10 April 1933, he defended his title against Jock McAvoy. This ended in defeat for Harvey but two months later he was in the ring again challenging Eddie Phillips and won on points to become British Light Heavyweight champion. On 30 November that year he beat the then unbeaten Jack Petersen to become the British Heavyweight champion. He then went on to beat Canada's Larry Gains to become British Empire champion, but lost both titles in a rematch with Petersen being stopped in the 12th round on cuts. Harvey then went on to fight for the world title on 9 November 1936, but was beaten on points by John Henry Lewis. He then regained the British Heavyweight title by disqualification against old foe Eddie Phillips. In 1936, he starred in the film, Excuse My Glove. In 1938 John Henry Lewis retired after developing eye problems, Harvey was then matched with another old foe Jock McAvoy for British recognition of the world championship at Harringay Arena. This time he won on points on 10 July 1939.

== Later career and death ==
During the Second World War Harvey joined the Royal Air Force. He was seen in the eyes of the public as a national sporting idol and was given an officer rank. During this time he was persuaded to defend his titles against Freddie Mills on 20 June 1942. Harvey was a veteran of over a hundred bouts and was 35 years old. He was knocked out in two rounds, only the second time he was stopped and the first by K.O. He retired after this bout. He had an official record of 146 fights, 122 wins, 10 draws and 14 defeats: he claimed to have had 418 fights, but they probably included booth fights. His four fights with Jock McAvoy were legendary; he won three and lost one. He later died in Plymouth on 28 November 1976 of a heart attack relaxing at his home and commenting to his wife he was feeling ill. He was inducted into the International Boxing Hall of Fame in 2008.

== Professional boxing record ==
146 fights	122 wins	14 losses
By knockout	57	2
By decision	59	12
By disqualification	6	0
Draws	10	

No.	Result	Record	Opponent	Type	Round, time	Date	Age	Location	Notes
146	Loss	122–14–10	Freddie Mills	KO	2 (15), 0:58	Jun 20, 1942	34 years, 344 days	White Hart Lane (Tottenham FC), London, England, UK	Lost Commonwealth and BBBofC British light heavyweight titles
145	Win	122–13–10	Jock McAvoy	PTS	15	Jul 10, 1939	31 years, 364 days	White City Stadium, London, England, UK	Retained British light-heavyweight title; Won BBBofC world and vacant Commonwealth light-heavyweight titles
144	Win	121–13–10	Larry Gains	TKO	13 (15)	Mar 16, 1939	31 years, 248 days	Harringay Arena, London, England, UK	Retained British heavyweight title; Won vacant Commonwealth heavyweight title
143	Win	120–13–10	Eddie Phillips	DQ	4 (15)	Dec 1, 1938	31 years, 143 days	Harringay Arena, London, England, UK	Won vacant British heavyweight title
142	Win	119–13–10	Jock McAvoy	PTS	15	Apr 7, 1938	30 years, 270 days	Harringay Arena, London, England, UK	Won British light-heavyweight title
141	Win	118–13–10	Manuel Kid Abrew	TKO	14 (15), 2:58	Feb 15, 1937	29 years, 219 days	Shawfield Park, Glasgow, Scotland, UK	
140	Loss	117–13–10	John Henry Lewis	PTS	15	Nov 9, 1936	29 years, 121 days	Empire Pool, London, England, UK	For NYSAC, NBA, and The Ring light-heavyweight titles
139	Loss	117–12–10	Jack Petersen	PTS	15	Jan 29, 1936	28 years, 202 days	Wembley Arena, London, England, UK	For British and Commonwealth heavyweight titles
138	Win	117–11–10	Eddie Phillips	PTS	15	Oct 26, 1935	28 years, 107 days	Wyndham Hall, Devon, England, UK	
137	Win	116–11–10	Marcel Lauriot	PTS	10	Apr 29, 1935	27 years, 292 days	The Ring, London, England, UK	
136	Draw	115–11–10	Walter Neusel	PTS	12	Nov 26, 1934	27 years, 138 days	Wembley Arena, London, England, UK	
135	Loss	115–11–9	Jack Petersen	TKO	12 (15)	Jun 4, 1934	26 years, 328 days	White City Stadium, London, England, UK	Lost British and Commonwealth heavyweight titles
134	Win	115–10–9	Jimmy Tarante	DQ	5 (12)	Apr 12, 1934	26 years, 275 days	Royal Albert Hall, London, England, UK	Tarante was DQ'd for low blows
133	Win	114–10–9	Larry Gains	PTS	15	Feb 8, 1934	26 years, 212 days	Royal Albert Hall, London, England, UK	Retained British heavyweight title; Won Commonwealth heavyweight title
132	Win	113–10–9	Jack Petersen	PTS	15	Nov 30, 1933	26 years, 142 days	Royal Albert Hall, London, England, UK	Won British heavyweight title
131	Win	112–10–9	Carmelo Candel	KO	5 (12)	Oct 16, 1933	26 years, 97 days	Palais des Sports, Paris, France	
130	Win	111–10–9	Eddie Phillips	PTS	15	Jun 12, 1933	25 years, 336 days	Olympia, London, England, UK	Won vacant British light-heavyweight title
129	Loss	110–10–9	Jock McAvoy	PTS	15	Apr 10, 1933	25 years, 273 days	King's Hall, Belle Vue, Manchester, Lancashire, England, UK	Lost British and Commonwealth middleweight titles
128	Draw	110–9–9	Eddie Phillips	PTS	12	Mar 13, 1933	25 years, 245 days	Royal Albert Hall, London, England, UK	
127	Win	110–9–8	Jack Casey	PTS	15	Dec 12, 1932	25 years, 154 days	New St. James Hall, Newcastle, Tyne and Wear, England, UK	Retained British and Commonwealth middleweight titles
126	Win	109–9–8	Glen Moody	TKO	6 (10)	Dec 2, 1932	25 years, 144 days	Promenade Pier Pavilion, Plymouth, Devon, England, UK	
125	Win	108–9–8	Seaman Albert Harvey	PTS	10	Nov 21, 1932	25 years, 133 days	Granby Halls, Leicester, Leicestershire, England, UK	
124	Win	107–9–8	Theo Sas	TKO	1 (15), 2:55	Nov 14, 1932	25 years, 126 days	Olympia Hall, Bradford, Yorkshire, England, UK	
123	Loss	106–9–8	Marcel Thil	PTS	15	Jul 4, 1932	24 years, 359 days	White City Stadium, London, England, UK	For NBA, IBU, and The Ring middleweight titles
122	Win	106–8–8	Len Johnson	PTS	15	May 11, 1932	24 years, 305 days	Royal Albert Hall, London, England, UK	
121	Win	105–8–8	Jock McAvoy	PTS	15	Mar 21, 1932	24 years, 254 days	King's Hall, Belle Vue, Manchester, Lancashire, England, UK	Retained British and Commonwealth middleweight titles
120	Win	104–8–8	Jack Casey	PTS	15	Feb 8, 1932	24 years, 212 days	New St. James Hall, Newcastle, Tyne and Wear, England, UK	
119	Win	103–8–8	George Slack	PTS	15	Jan 17, 1932	24 years, 190 days	South London Palace, London, England, UK	
118	Win	102–8–8	Fred Shaw	KO	3 (15)	Nov 30, 1931	24 years, 142 days	King's Hall, Belle Vue, Manchester, Lancashire, England, UK	
117	Win	101–8–8	Jerry Daley	KO	3 (15)	Jul 1, 1931	23 years, 355 days	Bristol Rovers Eastville Stadium, Bristol, Avon, England, UK	
116	Win	100–8–8	Jack Hood	PTS	15	Jun 22, 1931	23 years, 346 days	Royal Albert Hall, London, England, UK	
115	Win	99–8–8	Rene De Vos	KO	1 (15)	Jun 1, 1931	23 years, 325 days	Royal Albert Hall, London, England, UK	
114	Loss	98–8–8	Ben Jeby	UD	12	Mar 20, 1931	23 years, 252 days	Madison Square Garden, New York City, New York, US	
113	Loss	98–7–8	Vince Dundee	SD	12	Feb 13, 1931	23 years, 217 days	Madison Square Garden, New York City, New York, US	
112	Loss	98–6–8	Vince Dundee	UD	12	Jan 9, 1931	23 years, 182 days	Madison Square Garden, New York City, New York, US	
111	Win	98–5–8	George Slack	PTS	12	Dec 14, 1930	23 years, 156 days	National Sporting Club, Leeds, Yorkshire, England, UK	
110	Win	97–5–8	Dave Shade	PTS	15	Sep 29, 1930	23 years, 80 days	Royal Albert Hall, London, England, UK	
109	Win	96–5–8	Henri Vandevyvere	KO	1 (10)	Jul 6, 1930	22 years, 360 days	Premierland, London, England, UK	
108	Win	95–5–8	Charlie McDonald	KO	2 (10)	Jun 15, 1930	22 years, 339 days	Premierland, London, England, UK	
107	Win	94–5–8	Steve McCall	RTD	9 (15)	May 22, 1930	22 years, 315 days	Olympia, London, England, UK	Retained British and Commonwealth middleweight titles
106	Win	93–5–8	Frans Stevens	KO	3 (15)	Mar 4, 1930	22 years, 236 days	Olympia, London, England, UK	
105	Draw	92–5–8	Jack Hood	PTS	15	Dec 18, 1929	22 years, 160 days	Olympia, London, England, UK	Retained British and Commonwealth middleweight titles
104	Win	92–5–7	Jack Hood	PTS	15	Oct 21, 1929	22 years, 102 days	Holborn Stadium Club, London, England, UK	Retained British and Commonwealth middleweight titles
103	Win	91–5–7	Alex Ireland	KO	7 (15)	May 16, 1929	21 years, 309 days	Olympia, London, England, UK	Won British and Commonwealth middleweight titles
102	Win	90–5–7	Frank Moody	TKO	6 (10)	Feb 21, 1929	21 years, 225 days	Selhurst Park Football Ground, London, England, UK	
101	Win	89–5–7	Amedee Dubus	KO	1 (10)	Dec 17, 1928	21 years, 159 days	Alexandra Theatre, Birmingham, West Midlands, England, UK	
100	Win	88–5–7	Leo Frick	KO	2 (10)	Dec 3, 1928	21 years, 145 days	National Sporting Club, London, England, UK	
99	Win	87–5–7	Johnny Sullivan	RTD	6 (15)	Oct 29, 1928	21 years, 110 days	National Sporting Club, London, England, UK	
98	Win	86–5–7	Auguste Lengagne	KO	9 (15)	Oct 1, 1928	21 years, 82 days	The Ring, London, England, UK	
97	Win	85–5–7	Guardsman George West	DQ	4 (10)	Sep 2, 1928	21 years, 53 days	Premierland, London, England, UK	
96	Win	84–5–7	Emile Egrel	PTS	15	Jul 30, 1928	21 years, 19 days	National Sporting Club, London, England, UK	
95	Win	83–5–7	Auguste Lengagne	KO	10 (15)	Apr 24, 1928	20 years, 288 days	National Sporting Club, London, England, UK	
94	Win	82–5–7	Jean Forr	KO	7 (10)	Mar 5, 1928	20 years, 238 days	National Sporting Club, London, England, UK	
93	Win	81–5–7	Kid Nitram	DQ	14 (20)	Jan 19, 1928	20 years, 192 days	Royal Albert Hall, London, England, UK	
92	Win	80–5–7	Marcel Thil	PTS	15	Dec 12, 1927	20 years, 154 days	Holland Park Rink, London, England, UK	
91	Win	79–5–7	Emile Egrel	PTS	15	Nov 29, 1927	20 years, 141 days	National Sporting Club, London, England, UK	
90	Win	78–5–7	Jack Etienne	TKO	13 (15)	Oct 31, 1927	20 years, 112 days	The Ring, London, England, UK	
89	Win	77–5–7	Piet Brand	PTS	14 (15)	Oct 16, 1927	20 years, 97 days	Premierland, London, England, UK	Due to an error by the timekeeper the bout only lasted 14 rounds
88	Win	76–5–7	Primo Ubaldo	KO	2 (10)	Sep 22, 1927	20 years, 73 days	Premierland, London, England, UK	
87	Win	75–5–7	Billy Farmer	KO	2 (10)	Sep 1, 1927	20 years, 52 days	Premierland, London, England, UK	
86	Win	74–5–7	Charles Screve	KO	2 (15)	Aug 11, 1927	20 years, 31 days	Premierland, London, England, UK	
85	Win	73–5–7	Emile Egrel	TKO	13 (15)	Jul 7, 1927	19 years, 361 days	The Ring, London, England, UK	
84	Win	72–5–7	Piet Brand	DQ	6 (15)	Jun 5, 1927	19 years, 329 days	The Ring, London, England, UK	
83	Win	71–5–7	Joe Rolfe	TKO	10 (15)	Apr 25, 1927	19 years, 288 days	Holland Park Rink, London, England, UK	
82	Win	70–5–7	Joe Bloomfield	DQ	11 (15)	Apr 4, 1927	19 years, 267 days	The Ring, London, England, UK	
81	Win	69–5–7	Maurice Prunier	PTS	15	Mar 14, 1927	19 years, 246 days	The Ring, London, England, UK	
80	Loss	68–5–7	Len Johnson	PTS	20	Jan 13, 1927	19 years, 186 days	The Ring, London, England, UK	
79	Win	68–4–7	Andy Newton	TKO	8 (15)	Dec 13, 1926	19 years, 155 days	The Ring, London, England, UK	
78	Win	67–4–7	Nol Steenhorst	PTS	15	Nov 22, 1926	19 years, 134 days	The Ring, London, England, UK	
77	Draw	66–4–7	'Hamilton' Johnny Brown	PTS	20	Sep 13, 1926	19 years, 64 days	The Ring, London, England, UK	
76	Win	66–4–6	Nol Steenhorst	TKO	15 (15)	Jul 4, 1926	18 years, 358 days	The Ring, London, England, UK	
75	Win	65–4–6	Billy Mattick	KO	7 (15)	Jun 14, 1926	18 years, 338 days	The Ring, London, England, UK	
74	Draw	64–4–6	Harry Mason	PTS	20	Apr 29, 1926	18 years, 292 days	Royal Albert Hall, London, England, UK	For British welterweight title
73	Win	64–4–5	Harry Benton	KO	3 (15)	Apr 1, 1926	18 years, 264 days	Drill Hall, Plymouth, Devon, England, UK	
72	Loss	63–4–5	Johnny Sullivan	PTS	20	Mar 1, 1926	18 years, 233 days	The Ring, London, England, UK	
71	Win	63–3–5	Billy Bird	KO	8 (15)	Feb 2, 1926	18 years, 206 days	Lime Grove Baths, London, England, UK	
70	Draw	62–3–5	Alf Mancini	PTS	20	Jan 4, 1926	18 years, 177 days	The Ring, London, England, UK	
69	Win	62–3–4	Edouard Baudry	PTS	15	Nov 19, 1925	18 years, 131 days	The Ring, London, England, UK	
68	Win	61–3–4	Henri Dupont	RTD	2 (15)	Oct 29, 1925	18 years, 110 days	The Ring, London, England, UK	
67	Win	60–3–4	Glyn Davies	KO	2 (15)	Sep 26, 1925	18 years, 77 days	The Ring, London, England, UK	
66	Win	59–3–4	Bill Handley	RTD	8 (15)	Sep 2, 1925	18 years, 53 days	Drill Hall, Plymouth, Devon, England, UK	
65	Win	58–3–4	Harry Kent	KO	2 (10)	Aug 22, 1925	18 years, 42 days	The Ring, London, England, UK	
64	Win	57–3–4	Jos Leukemans	PTS	15	Jul 20, 1925	18 years, 9 days	The Ring, London, England, UK	
63	Win	56–3–4	Terry 'Young' Donlan	TKO	2 (15)	Jul 2, 1925	17 years, 356 days	The Ring, London, England, UK	
62	Win	55–3–4	Fred Bullions	KO	10 (15)	Jun 22, 1925	17 years, 346 days	Holland Park Rink, London, England, UK	
61	Win	54–3–4	Pietro Bianchi	KO	6 (15)	Jun 13, 1925	17 years, 337 days	The Ring, London, England, UK	
60	Win	53–3–4	Jos Leukemans	PTS	15	May 14, 1925	17 years, 307 days	The Ring, London, England, UK	
59	Win	52–3–4	Karel van 't Veldt	PTS	15	Apr 30, 1925	17 years, 293 days	The Ring, London, England, UK	
58	Win	51–3–4	Johnny Thomas	KO	1 (15)	Apr 18, 1925	17 years, 281 days	The Ring, London, England, UK	
57	Win	50–3–4	Walter Maloney	KO	1 (10)	Mar 30, 1925	17 years, 262 days	National Sporting Club, London, England, UK	
56	Win	49–3–4	Laurie Guard	KO	5 (12)	Feb 19, 1925	17 years, 223 days	The Ring, London, England, UK	
55	Win	48–3–4	Harry Kent	KO	4 (15)	Jan 26, 1925	17 years, 199 days	The Ring, London, England, UK	
54	Win	47–3–4	Seaman Jerry Harrod	KO	5 (10)	Jan 1, 1925	17 years, 174 days	The Ring, London, England, UK	
53	Win	46–3–4	Sid Cannons	PTS	12	Dec 8, 1924	17 years, 150 days	Premierland, London, England, UK	
52	Win	45–3–4	Albert 'Young' Dando	TKO	4 (12)	Oct 20, 1924	17 years, 101 days	Premierland, London, England, UK	
51	Draw	44–3–4	Albert 'Young' Dando	PTS	15	Oct 4, 1924	17 years, 85 days	The Ring, London, England, UK	
50	Win	44–3–3	Bert Saunders	PTS	12	Sep 20, 1924	17 years, 71 days	The Ring, London, England, UK	
49	Win	43–3–3	Tim Rowley	KO	2 (10)	Sep 1, 1924	17 years, 52 days	The Ring, London, England, UK	
48	Win	42–3–3	Billy Streets	PTS	12 (15)	Aug 11, 1924	17 years, 31 days	The Ring, London, England, UK	
47	Win	41–3–3	Albert Hicks	PTS	15	Jul 17, 1924	17 years, 6 days	Premierland, London, England, UK	
46	Win	40–3–3	Wal Jordan	KO	1 (10)	Jul 3, 1924	16 years, 358 days	Royal Albert Hall, London, England, UK	
45	Win	39–3–3	Young Freddie Welsh	PTS	15	Jun 19, 1924	16 years, 344 days	The Ring, London, England, UK	
44	Win	38–3–3	Ernie Jarvis	PTS	15	Jun 2, 1924	16 years, 327 days	The Ring, London, England, UK	
43	Win	37–3–3	Young Clancy	PTS	15	May 17, 1924	16 years, 311 days	The Ring, London, England, UK	
42	Win	36–3–3	Billy Will Davies	PTS	15	Apr 24, 1924	16 years, 288 days	The Ring, London, England, UK	
41	Win	35–3–3	Bill Riley	PTS	15	Apr 12, 1924	16 years, 276 days	The Ring, London, England, UK	
40	Win	34–3–3	Matt George	TKO	3 (20)	Mar 10, 1924	16 years, 243 days	Kensington Baths, London, England, UK	
39	Win	33–3–3	Billy Pop Humphries	PTS	20	Feb 11, 1924	16 years, 215 days	Kensington Baths, London, England, UK	
38	Draw	32–3–3	Bill Riley	PTS	15	Nov 30, 1923	16 years, 142 days	Cosmopolitan Gymnasium, Plymouth, Devon, England, UK	
37	Win	32–3–2	Billy Pop Humphries	PTS	15	Oct 22, 1923	16 years, 103 days	Kensington Baths, London, England, UK	
36	Win	31–3–2	Kid Socks	PTS	15	Sep 21, 1923	16 years, 72 days	Cosmopolitan Gymnasium, Plymouth, Devon, England, UK	
35	Win	30–3–2	Harry 'Young' Jinks	PTS	6	Jul 28, 1923	16 years, 17 days	Home Park, Plymouth, Devon, England, UK	
34	Win	29–3–2	Nip Williams	PTS	8	Jul 13, 1923	16 years, 2 days	Civic Hall, Exeter, Devon, England, UK	
33	Win	28–3–2	Fred Bicknell	RTD	3 (8)	Jun 22, 1923	15 years, 346 days	Cosmopolitan Gymnasium, Plymouth, Devon, England, UK	
32	Draw	27–3–2	Young Callicot	PTS	8	Apr 27, 1923	15 years, 290 days	Cosmopolitan Gymnasium, Plymouth, Devon, England, UK	
31	Win	27–3–1	Bill Lewis	RTD	5 (8)	Jan 2, 1923	15 years, 175 days	National Sporting Club, London, England, UK	
30	Win	26–3–1	Jack Palmer	RTD	5 (8)	Nov 17, 1922	15 years, 129 days	Cosmopolitan Gymnasium, Plymouth, Devon, England, UK	
29	Win	25–3–1	Young Callicot	PTS	10	Sep 29, 1922	15 years, 80 days	Cosmopolitan Gymnasium, Plymouth, Devon, England, UK	
28	Loss	24–3–1	Kid Kelly	PTS	10	Jul 14, 1922	15 years, 4 days	Cosmopolitan Gymnasium, Plymouth, Devon, England, UK	
27	Loss	24–2–1	Young Callicot	PTS	8	Jun 30, 1922	14 years, 354 days	Cosmopolitan Gymnasium, Plymouth, Devon, England, UK	
26	Win	24–1–1	Harry 'Young' Jinks	KO	3 (?)	Jun 2, 1922	14 years, 326 days	Cosmopolitan Gymnasium, Plymouth, Devon, England, UK	
25	Win	23–1–1	Teddy Gilbert	PTS	6	May 5, 1922	14 years, 298 days	Cosmopolitan Gymnasium, Plymouth, Devon, England, UK	
24	Win	22–1–1	Billy Williams	KO	3 (6)	Mar 31, 1922	14 years, 263 days	Cosmopolitan Gymnasium, Plymouth, Devon, England, UK	
23	Win	21–1–1	Johnny Cotter	RTD	3 (6)	Mar 17, 1922	14 years, 249 days	Cosmopolitan Gymnasium, Plymouth, Devon, England, UK	
22	Win	20–1–1	Young O'Neill	TKO	2 (6)	Feb 3, 1922	14 years, 207 days	Cosmopolitan Gymnasium, Plymouth, Devon, England, UK	
21	Win	19–1–1	Johnny Cotter	PTS	6	Dec 27, 1921	14 years, 169 days	Cosmopolitan Gymnasium, Plymouth, Devon, England, UK	
20	Win	18–1–1	Johnny Cotter	PTS	6	Nov 25, 1921	14 years, 137 days	Cosmopolitan Gymnasium, Plymouth, Devon, England, UK	
19	Win	17–1–1	Young Callicot	PTS	6	Sep 9, 1921	14 years, 60 days	Cosmopolitan Gymnasium, Plymouth, Devon, England, UK	
18	Win	16–1–1	Harry 'Young' Jinks	PTS	6	Jun 24, 1921	13 years, 348 days	Cosmopolitan Gymnasium, Plymouth, Devon, England, UK	
17	Win	15–1–1	Young Richards	KO	1 (6)	Jun 17, 1921	13 years, 341 days	Cosmopolitan Gymnasium, Plymouth, Devon, England, UK	
16	Win	14–1–1	Harry 'Young' Jinks	PTS	6	May 6, 1921	13 years, 299 days	Cosmopolitan Gymnasium, Plymouth, Devon, England, UK	
15	Win	13–1–1	Harry 'Young' Jinks	PTS	8	Apr 15, 1921	13 years, 278 days	Cosmopolitan Gymnasium, Plymouth, Devon, England, UK	
14	Win	12–1–1	Harry 'Young' Jinks	PTS	6	Mar 18, 1921	13 years, 250 days	Cosmopolitan Gymnasium, Plymouth, Devon, England, UK	
13	Win	11–1–1	Harry 'Young' Jinks	PTS	?	Feb 25, 1921	13 years, 229 days	Cosmopolitan Gymnasium, Plymouth, Devon, England, UK	
12	Win	10–1–1	Harry 'Young' Jinks	PTS	6	Feb 4, 1921	13 years, 208 days	Cosmopolitan Gymnasium, Plymouth, Devon, England, UK	
11	Win	9–1–1	Teddy Gilbert	PTS	6	Dec 27, 1920	13 years, 169 days	Cosmopolitan Gymnasium, Plymouth, Devon, England, UK	
10	Draw	8–1–1	Young Ball	PTS	6	Sep 17, 1920	13 years, 68 days	Cosmopolitan Gymnasium, Plymouth, Devon, England, UK	
9	Win	8–1	Young Mac	RTD	1 (6)	Aug 6, 1920	13 years, 26 days	Cosmopolitan Gymnasium, Plymouth, Devon, England, UK	
8	Win	7–1	Kid Roberts	PTS	6	Jul 30, 1920	13 years, 19 days	Cosmopolitan Gymnasium, Plymouth, Devon, England, UK	
7	Win	6–1	Stanley's Nipper	PTS	6	Jun 4, 1920	12 years, 329 days	Cosmopolitan Gymnasium, Plymouth, Devon, England, UK	
6	Win	5–1	Young Chips	RTD	4 (6)	Apr 30, 1920	12 years, 294 days	Cosmopolitan Gymnasium, Plymouth, Devon, England, UK	
5	Win	4–1	Stanley's Nipper	PTS	6	Apr 9, 1920	12 years, 273 days	Cosmopolitan Gymnasium, Plymouth, Devon, England, UK	
4	Win	3–1	Young Fern	PTS	?	Mar 19, 1920	12 years, 252 days	Cosmopolitan Gymnasium, Plymouth, Devon, England, UK	
3	Win	2–1	Young Edwards	TKO	4 (?)	Jan 30, 1920	12 years, 203 days	Cosmopolitan Gymnasium, Plymouth, Devon, England, UK	
2	Loss	1–1	Young Fern	PTS	6	Jan 16, 1920	12 years, 189 days	Cosmopolitan Gymnasium, Plymouth, Devon, England, UK	
1	Win	1–0	Young King	PTS	6	Jan 2, 1920	12 years, 175 days	Cosmopolitan Gymnasium, Plymouth, Devon, England, UK	

== See also ==
- List of British heavyweight boxing champions
- List of British light-heavyweight boxing champions
- List of British middleweight boxing champions

Achievements
Preceded by Alexander Ireland	British Middleweight Champion; 16 May 1929 – 10 April 1933	Succeeded by Jock McAvoy
Preceded by Alexander Ireland	Commonwealth Middleweight Champion; 16 May 1929 – 10 April 1933	Succeeded by Jock McAvoy
Preceded by Jack Petersen	British Heavyweight Champion; 30 November 1933 – 4 June 1934	Succeeded by Jack Petersen
Preceded by Larry Gains	Commonwealth Heavyweight Champion; 8 February 1934 – 4 June 1934	Succeeded by Jack Petersen
Preceded by Jock McAvoy	British Light Heavyweight Champion; 7 April 1938 – 20 June 1942	Succeeded by Freddie Mills
Vacant Title last held by Gipsy Daniels	Commonwealth; Light Heavyweight Champion; 10 July 1939 – 20 June 1942	Succeeded by Freddie Mills
Vacant Title last held by Tommy Farr	British Heavyweight Champion; 1 December 1938 – 21 November 1942; Retired	Succeeded by Jack London
Vacant Title last held by Tommy Farr	Commonwealth Heavyweight Champion; 16 March 1939 – 21 November 1942; Retired	Succeeded by Jack London
Titles in pretence
Vacant Title last held by Joe Choynski	World Light Heavyweight Champion; BBBC recognition 10 July 1939 – 20 June 1942	Vacant
