= Jack Petersen (boxer) =

Welsh boxer (1911–1990)

Jack Petersen OBE TD
Personal information
- Nationality: British (Welsh)
- Born: John Charles Peterson; 2 September 1911 Cardiff, Wales
- Died: 22 November 1990 (aged 79) Bridgend, Wales
- Weight: Heavyweight
- Relative: David Petersen (son)

Boxing career
- Stance: Orthodox

Boxing record
- Total fights: 38
- Wins: 33
- Win by KO: 19
- Losses: 5

John Charles Peterson OBE TD (2 September 1911 – 22 November 1990) was a Welsh boxer who held the British heavyweight boxing title on two occasions. He was awarded the Territorial Decoration (TD) in 1950 and appointed Officer of the Order of the British Empire (OBE) in the 1978 Birthday Honours "for services to Sport particularly in Wales."

== Early life and career ==
He was born John Charles Peterson in Cardiff, the son of Thomas Peterson, a massage specialist and his wife Melinda Laura Rossiter. He took up amateur boxing as a youth and at the age of 18 he reached the Welsh Amateur Boxing Association finals at both middleweight and light-heavyweight. The following year he won the Welsh ABA titles at light-heavyweight and heavyweight, as well as winning the British ABA title at light-heavyweight.

He turned professional in 1931 and fought under the name of Jack Petersen. He was 6 ft 1½in tall and was a well proportioned athlete. His first professional fight was in September 1931 at the Holborn Stadium, London, against Bill Partridge. Petersen won the fight by a knockout in the fourth round. Petersen won his first sixteen fights, in one of which he knocked out Dick Power to win the Welsh heavyweight title.

== British titles ==
Petersen's 17th fight was for the British light-heavyweight title. It took place at Holborn Stadium in May 1932 and Petersen beat Harry Crossley on points over 15 rounds to take his title. He later relinquished this title without defending it. Two months later, in July 1932, Petersen fought Reggie Meen for his British heavyweight title, in a bout held at Wimbledon Stadium, London. He knocked Meen out in the second round, becoming the first Welshman to be British heavyweight champion. He had accomplished this in a career lasting less than ten months.

He had one more fight, scoring a knockout, and then defended his title against Jack Pettifer in January 1932. The bout was at Olympia in Kensington and Petersen scored a knockout in the 12th round to retain his title.

Petersen had three more fights, winning them all, before defending his title again against Jack Doyle, a young boxer from County Cork. The bout, in July 1933, was held at the White City Stadium in front of a crowd of about 30,000. It lasted less than two rounds as Doyle was disqualified for repeatedly punching low.

In his next fight, Petersen made his third title defence, against Len Harvey. The bout was in November 1933, at the Royal Albert Hall, and Harvey won on points over 15 rounds. This was Petersen's first defeat in his 25th fight.

Petersen resumed his winning ways, winning his next 4 fights on knockouts. Three of the victims were top fighters Reggie Meen, Harry Crossley and Ben Foord. Petersen was now ready to try to win back the heavyweight title.

== Titles regained ==
The re-match with Len Harvey was for the British and the British Empire (now Commonwealth) titles. They fought in June 1934 at the White City Stadium, London and this time Petersen was victorious by a twelfth-round technical knockout.

Next, Petersen defended his British Empire title against the Canadian boxer, Larry Gains, in September 1934. The bout was at the White City Stadium and Petersen won by a technical knockout in the thirteenth round.

He then defended his titles against George Cook in December 1934, winning on points over fifteen rounds. He had so far suffered only one defeat in 32 bouts, but he was to suffer two at the hands of the same fighter. Petersen twice fought a young German heavyweight, Walter Neusel at Wembley, in February and June 1935, and lost both bouts by a technical knockout in the eleventh round.

These two defeats were a shock. Throughout his short career he had been managed by his father, but the relationship broke down following his latest defeats and Petersen decided to manage himself in future. Petersen continued to defend his titles successfully. He met Len Harvey for a third title fight in January 1936, at Wembley, and won on points over fifteen rounds.

He made a third title defence in April 1936 when he met Jock McAvoy at Earls Court. He again won on points over fifteen rounds. McAvoy was the reigning middleweight and light-heavyweight champion, and in his previous fight had unsuccessfully fought for the world light-heavyweight title.

Petersen's fourth title defence was against Ben Foord, whom he had knocked out in thirteen rounds in 1934, when preparing for his re-match with Len Harvey. Foord was a South African, who was qualified by residence to fight for both titles. The bout was in August 1936 at Leicester, and Petersen lost by a technical knockout in the third round.

Having lost his titles, Petersen had one last fight before retiring. He had a third bout against Walter Neusel, at Harringay Arena in February 1937. He lost to Neusel for the third time, by a technical knockout in the tenth round.

He retired at the relatively young age of twenty-five. In his five and a half-year boxing career, Petersen had won 33 of his 38 fights, 19 of them by knockouts, losing 5 and drawing none. Three of his five defeats had been to the same man, Walter Neusel. Neusel was later to be German heavyweight champion.

== Retirement ==
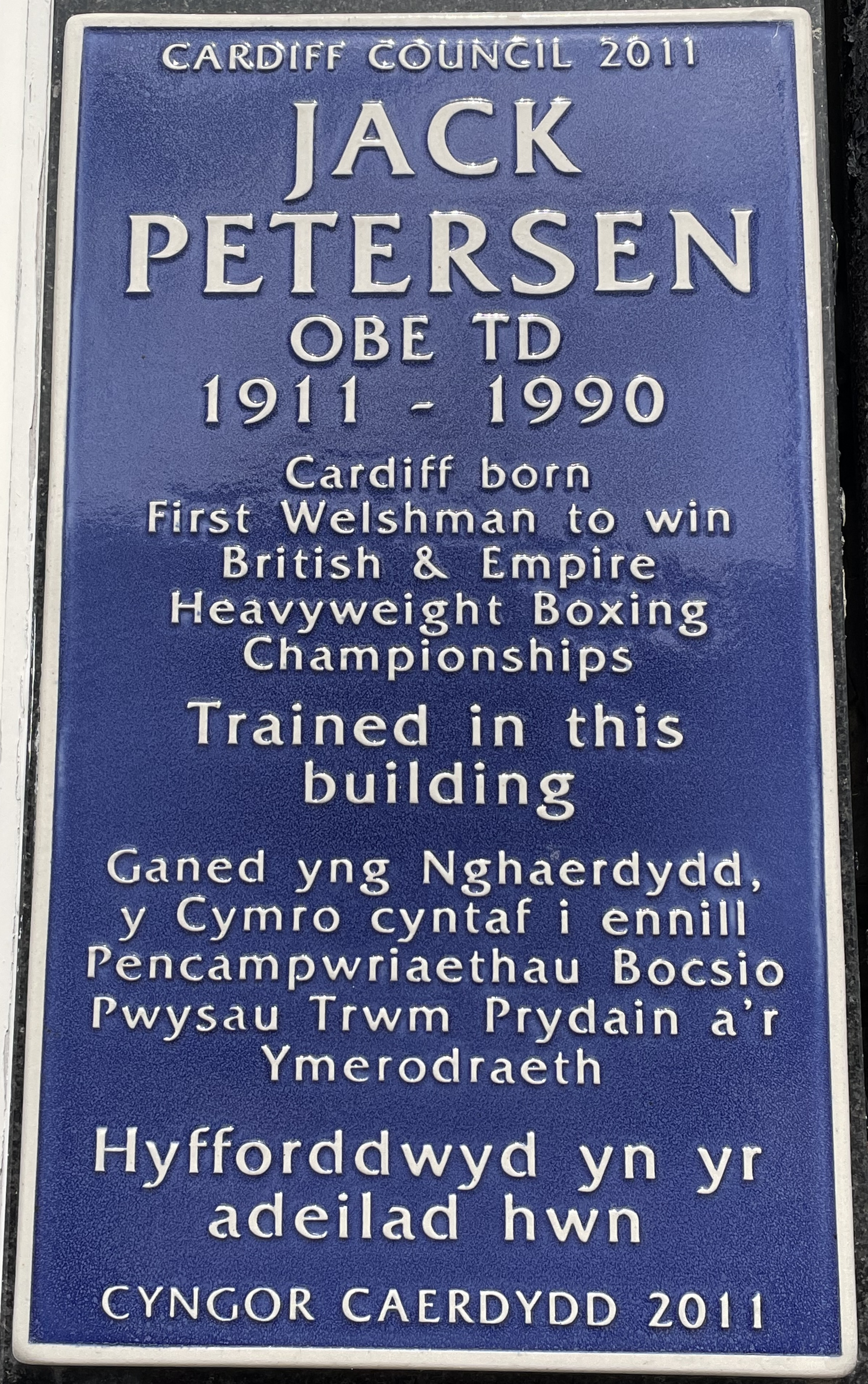
Blue plaque for Jack Peterson at 6-7 St John Street, Cardiff

The Second World War soon came and Petersen, who had joined the Territorial Army in early 1939 being promoted to Honorary Captain by August 1939, joined the regular army. During his service he was a staff officer with Western Command and also served with the Border Regiment. He was transferred to Chester and placed in charge of troop development schemes. He became Staff Officer in charge of Physical Training for his Division in March 1941 working from a Training School operated on the South Wales coast near Penarth. His requests to serve abroad were refused. After the war he became involved with the British Boxing Board of Control, dealing with boxing in Wales. In 1986 he became president of the board; he was also vice-chairman of the Sports Council for Wales (now Sport Wales).

In October 1935, he married Annie Elizabeth "Betty" Williams, daughter of Thomas Baker Williams, an auctioneer, of Cardiff. One of Petersen's sons is the sculptor David Petersen. Another son was John Petersen, an army officer, and then a successful marketing director of several international companies, including American Express (Europe), Forte Hotels, and the Daily Express. Another son was Michael.

Jack was the subject of This Is Your Life in 1957 when he was surprised by Eamonn Andrews at the Memorial Hall in Barry. He died on 22 November 1990, at the Princess of Wales Hospital, Bridgend, of lung cancer.

== See also ==
- List of British heavyweight boxing champions
- List of British light-heavyweight boxing champions

Achievements
Preceded by Reggie Meen	British Heavyweight Champion; 12 July 1932 – 30 November 1933	Succeeded by Len Harvey
Preceded by Len Harvey	British Heavyweight Champion; Commonwealth Heavyweight Champion; 4 June 1934 – 17 August 1936	Succeeded by Ben Foord
