= Quintin Romero Rojas =

Chilean boxer (1896–1972)

Quintín Romero Rojas
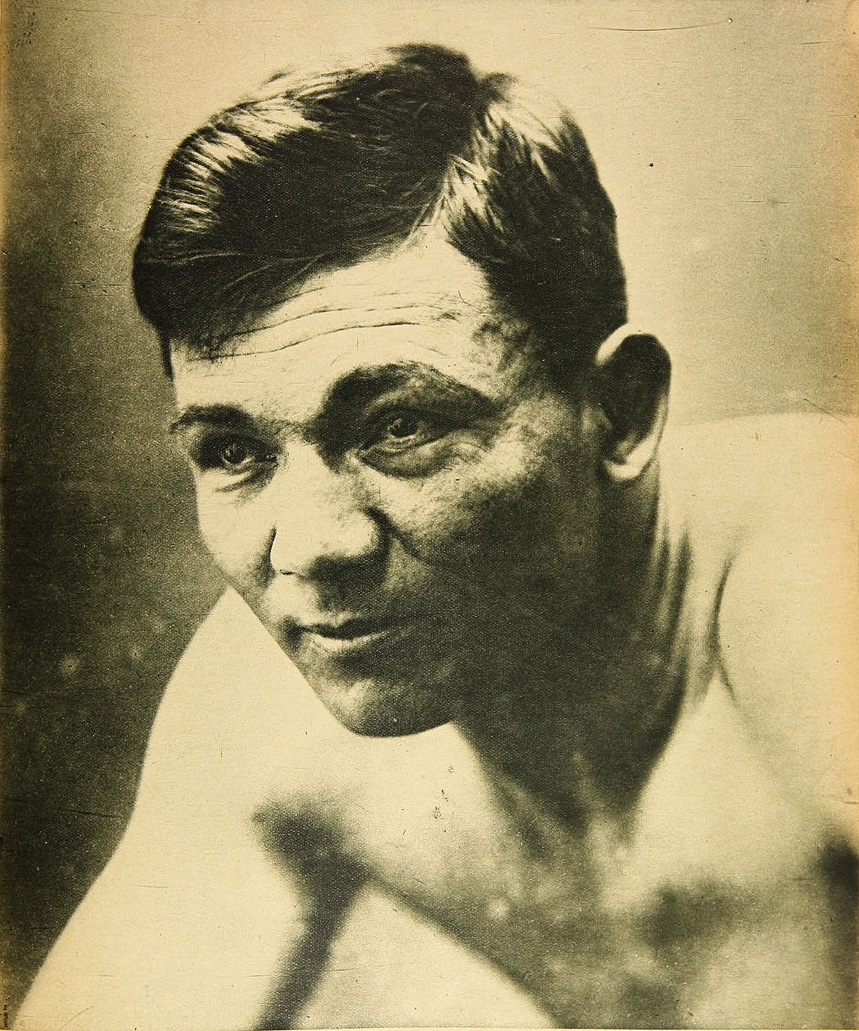

Personal information
- Nickname: Lion of the Andes
- Nationality: (Chile) Chilean
- Born: Quintín Romero Rojas; May 1, 1896 Vallenar, Chile
- Died: July 25, 1972 (aged 76) Antofagasta, Chile
- Occupation: Boxer
- Height: 6 ft 0 in (183cm)
- Weight: Heavyweight

Boxing career
- Reach: 75½ in (192cm)
- Stance: Orthodox

Boxing record
- Total fights: 79
- Wins: 31
- Win by KO: 16
- Losses: 41
- Draws: 7

Quintín Romero Rojas (May 1, 1896 – July 25, 1972), nicknamed the Lion of the Andes, was a Chilean professional heavyweight boxer who competed from 1920 to 1932.

== Early life ==
Quintín Romero Rojas was born in Chile in the 1890s.

Before his boxing career, Romero Rojas worked in Chile's nitrate mines. After a local promoter witnessed him carrying two nitrate bags simultaneously, each exceeding 100 pounds, under his arms, he was hired as a strongman performer at a local music hall. He later entered the boxing profession.

== Professional boxing career ==
Quintin Romero Rojas launched his pro boxing career in Antofagasta in 1920, losing his first bout but following with five straight KOs to compile an 11-2-2 record in Chile.

For some years, Abel Bersac worked as his trainer and manager, guiding him to become Chilean heavyweight champion.

He split from manager Abel Bersac, who opted to focus on his other prospect, Chilean lightweight champion Luis Vicentini, and take him to America. Romero Rojas traveled to France, where he connected with A. Echevarria, a Chilean living in Paris who became his manager. He trained under Gasquel, who had trained French boxer Georges Carpentier.

He delivered an 11th-round knockout of Larry Gains, future world colored heavyweight champion, in September 1923 at Salle Wagram in Paris, France. He then knocked out 1920 Olympian Xavier Eluère in November 1923. A devastating right hand to the jaw sent Eluère, France's third-ranked boxer, to the canvas only 30 seconds into the second round of the 20-round bout. Next, he scored a knockout of Marcel Nilles in December 1923, in fewer rounds than Georges Carpentier.

The Chilean heavyweight, who held both the South American and European championships, attracted significant publicity during the early 1920s. He called out South American heavyweight champion Luis Ángel Firpo. His reputation grew after Firpo refused to face the champion before leaving South America.

At 26, he came to the attention of American boxing promoter Tex Rickard in 1924, who arranged three bouts for him against Floyd Johnson, Fred Fulton, and Jack Renault. Success against these opponents would position him for a world title challenge against Jack Dempsey. Upon reaching the U.S., Romero Rojas came to the attention of American sportswriter Damon Runyon, who witnessed his first workout in April 1924. Runyon described him as having a build comparable to Jack Dempsey with a good, strong physique and being knock-kneed like Bob Fitzsimmons.

Seeking to follow Firpo's path, he debuted at Madison Square Garden in May 1924, where Iowa's Floyd Johnson, the first American he faced, knocked him out in the seventh round. His loss to Johnson delivered a blow to his world championship aspirations.

After collecting two wins, he signed to fight Newark's Charley Weinert, who was knocked out by Firpo, losing the 12-round match in July 1924. Following the loss, he went on to score a TKO victory over future champion Jack Sharkey in Boston that August.

He fought to a six-round draw with Sully Montgomery on November 5 and then defeated Johnny Risko on November 28, 1924. He met Canadian heavyweight Jack Renault for the first time in Boston on December 5, 1924, winning a 10-round decision.

On December 11, 1924, the South American Boxing Congress, representing Argentina, Chile, and Uruguay, awarded Romero Rojas the South American heavyweight title after stripping Firpo for failing to answer Romero's earlier challenge within the allotted time.

He began a losing streak, dropping his next three fights. In his second bout with Jack Renault on March 23, 1925, in Newark, he lost a 12-round newspaper decision.

The Chilean fought Harry Greb, then the world middleweight champion and a former light heavyweight champion, in May 1925. Weighing 195½ pounds, he lost on points to Greb, who came in at 169½ pounds. His losing streak continued with losses to Young Stribling, Emilio Solomon, and Young Bob Fitzsimmons.

His third meeting with Jack Renault in January 1926 ended with him being knocked out in round four of the 10-round bout. He suffered another knockout defeat the following month in February, this time at the hands of Jack Delaney.

He traveled to Havana, Cuba, to fight Santiago Esparraguera in March 1926. The Cuban was disqualified in the fifth round.

He met top contender Larry Gains in a rematch at Toronto's Coliseum in March 1927, going the full 10 rounds before losing on points. In his next fight, he claimed a newspaper decision win over rival Jack Renault in July 1927.

On January 29, 1928, he fought Spanish boxer Paulino Uzcudun in a bout in Mexico City billed as the heavyweight championship of Latin America. He suffered a knockout loss in the third round of the bout scheduled for 15 rounds.

He returned to South America for his last four fights, competing three times in Chile before his final bout in Buenos Aires in summer 1932.

== Professional boxing record ==
79 fights	31 wins	41 losses
By knockout	16	27
By decision	15	14
Draws	7	
No contests	0	

== Personal life ==
Romero Rojas came from a boxing family with three brothers who all fought professionally, one at lightweight, one at middleweight, and one at heavyweight.

== Death ==
Quintin Romero Rojas died on July 25, 1972, in Antofagasta, Chile.

== Gallery ==
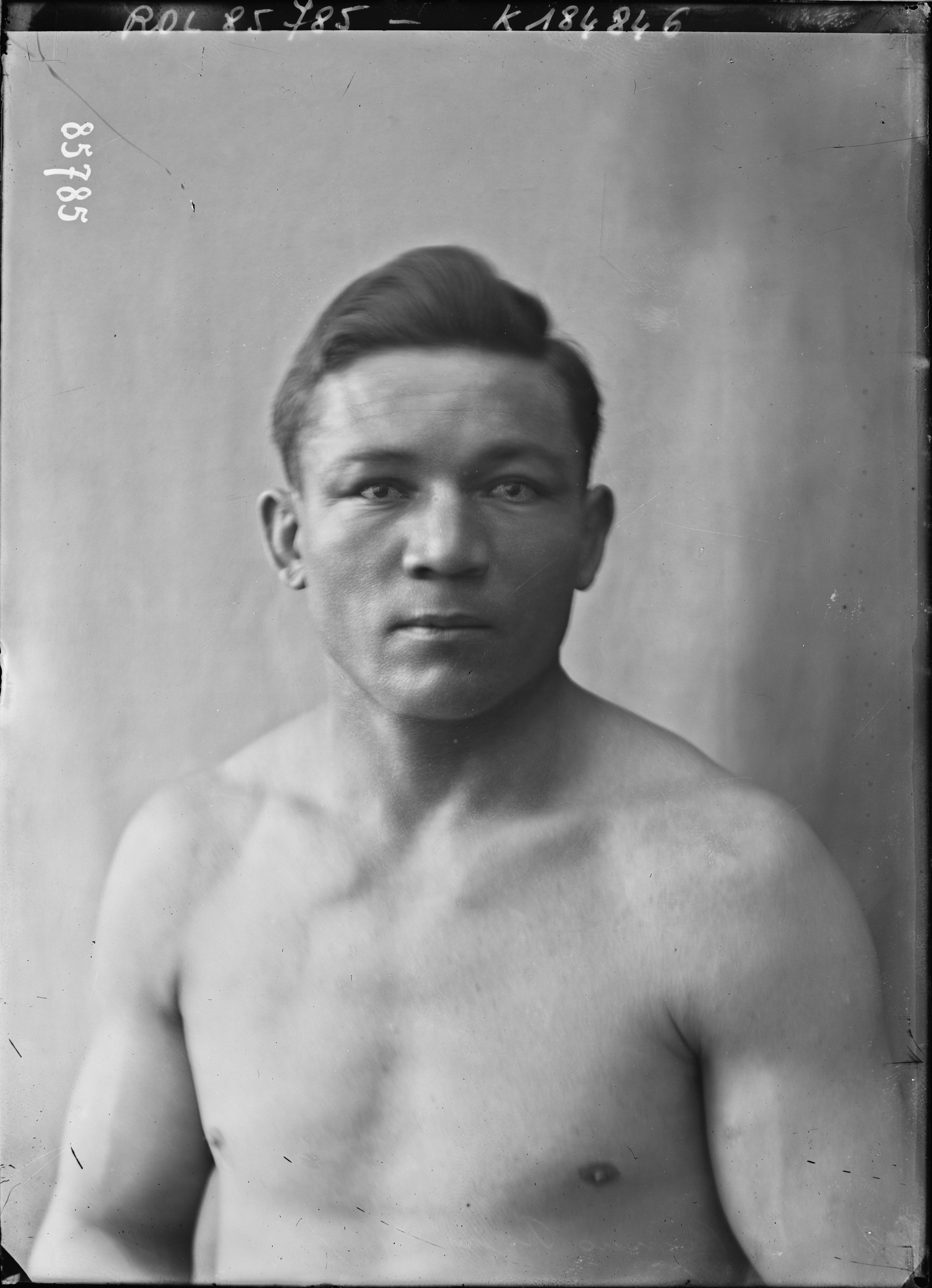
Quintin Romero Rojas, c. 1923

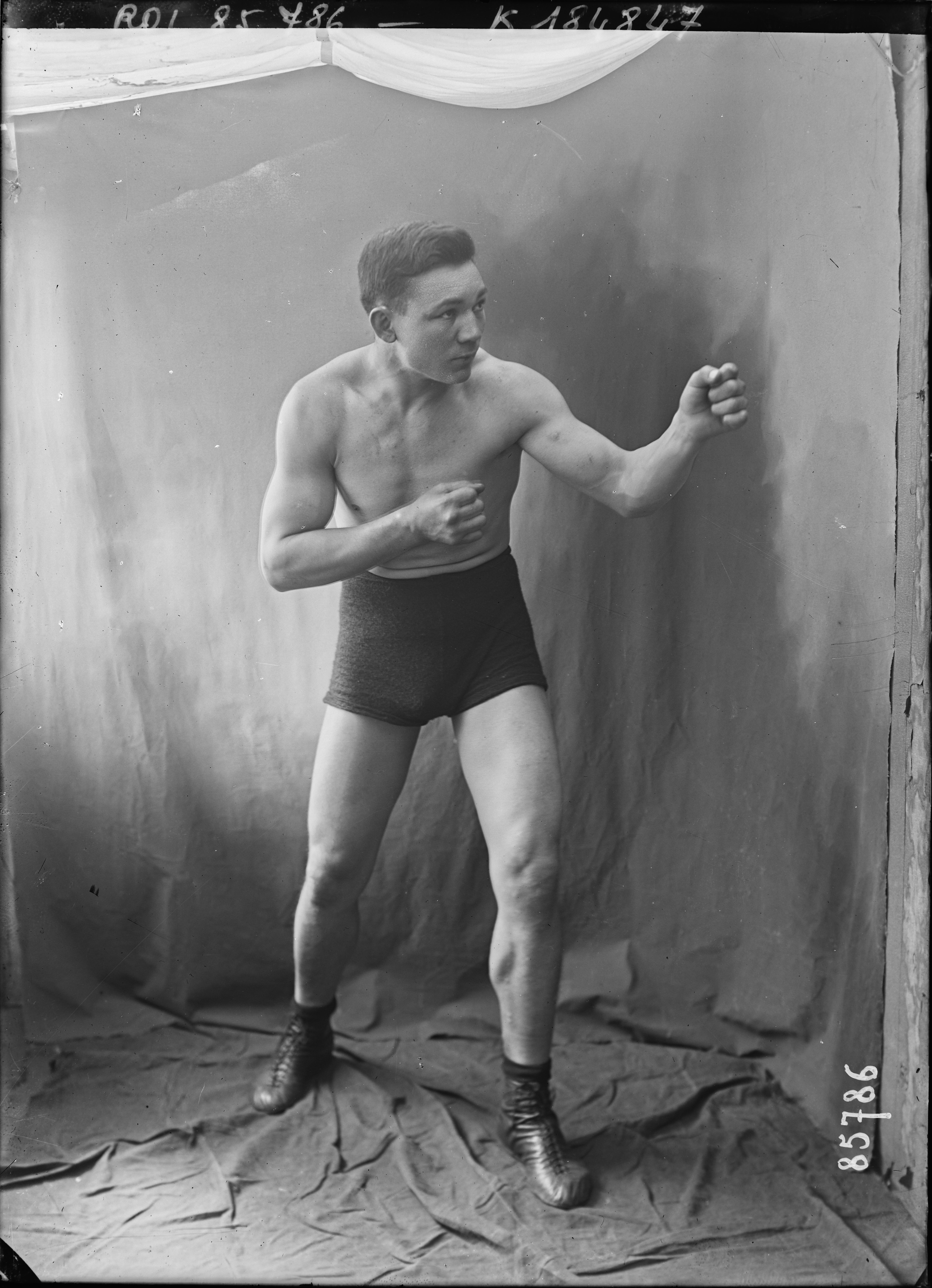
Quintin Romero Rojas, c. 1923
