= Gunspinning =

Twirling a handgun using the trigger guard

Gunspinning refers to the Old West tradition and Hollywood legend of a cowboy gunslinger twirling his handgun around his trigger finger. Gunspinning is a Western Art such as trick roping, and is sometimes referred as gunplay, gun artistry, fancy gun handling or gun twirling, though there isn’t an official competition. World Champions have been determined based on a performers skill and artistry. Former World Champions in this Western Art form include Rider Kiesner, Howard Darby, Rudy Uresti and Will Roberts. Gunspinning is seen in many classic TV and film Westerns, such as Shane and The Good, the Bad and the Ugly.

The majority of gunspinning is seen as a precursor to putting the gun back in its holster. It may be used as a flashy ending to a trick shot, or just to impress or intimidate an opponent.

== Notable examples ==
Some modern day Western performers and actors such as Dony Robert and Joey Rocketshoes Dillon can spin guns in each hand, and even incorporate juggling and tosses over the shoulders and around the body. Dillon is a multiple world champion at this craft.

In 1942, former boxer Ben Foord played a practical joke on his wife by sneaking up her with a pistol and pretending to be a desperado. Foord attempted gunspinning in the American frontier style and accidentally shot himself in the face, killing himself.

== See also ==
- Cowboy action shooting
- Fast draw
- Gun fu
