= Alannah Hill =

Australian fashion designer

Alannah Louise Hill (born 26 March 1962) is an Australian fashion designer who has had notable local and international success. Hill began her fashion career at Indigo Boutique in Chapel Street, South Yarra in 1980. In 1997, in partnership with Factory X, she created her namesake brand - Alannah Hill. In 2013, after a legal dispute Hill and Factory X parted ways. Factory X continue to run the chain of stores named for her without her input.

In 2014, she launched a new clothing brand, Louise Love.

== Background ==
Alannah Hill was born in Franklin, Tasmania, but spent much of her childhood in the coastal town of Penguin. At the age of 16 she moved to Melbourne, Victoria where she hoped to establish an acting career. She did have one small acting role in the 1986 film Dogs in Space starring Michael Hutchence.

== Career ==
Whilst waitressing in a cafe, she was offered a job at Indigo Boutique in Chapel Street, South Yarra, where she worked for fifteen years. It was here she created her first designs under the label Alannah Hill. She opened her first boutique in 1997, and with the financial backing of Melbourne-based business Factory X, eventually established 42 Alannah Hill stores in Australia as well as being stocked in David Jones stores.

Her collections were stocked in international department stores including Browns and Selfridges of London, and Henri Bendel and Bergdorf Goodman in New York. In her memoir, Butterfly on a Pin she shares that the names of her designs were often inspired by phrases uttered by her mother.

Alannah Hill's designs were distinguished by their girlish aesthetic, opulent embellishments and vintage romance. She is known for her eccentric, doll-like look and has said she has never been seen without full make-up. Hill's shop assistants were encouraged to mimic the appearance of the designer, and wore rosy cheeks and red lipstick

Fashion Melbourne commentator Janice Green Burns remarked "In a typical genre she was really unique. She revolutionised the concept of womenswear with a unique vision. It was feminine in a way that wasn’t saccharine. It always seemed very measured. Now it’s interesting to see how her background informed her ability to understand the creative process and understand her market."

On 15 August 2013, Hill announced she had walked away from her fashion business following a dispute with the label's owner, Factory X. They continue to operate the Alannah Hill stores, however, Hill would not design for, or have any further input into the brand. At the time of her announcement, Hill indicated that she wanted to continue in the fashion industry. Factory X continue to operate the brand. In 2017, the brand was removed from David Jones stores.

Hill began a new fashion brand, Louise Love, in 2014, with plans to launch a perfume and candle line in addition to clothing. Louise Love went on hiatus after Hill was diagnosed with melanoma in April 2015, which led to the amputation of the fourth toe of her left foot.

== Personal life ==
Hill has four siblings and she has a son, Edward, with Karl Bartl, founder and designer of menswear brand, Jack London. She is in a relationship with rock musician and record producer, Hugo Race.

Hill's memoir, Butterfly on a Pin, was published in May 2018 by Hardie Grant Books. A collection of short stories, The Handbag of Happiness: And other misunderstandings, misdemeanours and misadventures, was published in 2020.

She serves as an Ambassador to Sydney’s Centenary Institute of Science and Medical Research, raising funds for cancer research.
