= John London (disambiguation) =

John London was a musician.

John London is also the name of:

- John Griffith London, American writer
- John London (MP) for Leicester (UK Parliament constituency)
- John London (priest) (c.1486–1543), Warden of New College, Oxford
- John London (victualler) (d. 1770s), English victualler

== See also ==
- Jon London, film director
- Jack London (disambiguation)
- John of London
