= Jack London (boxer) =

English boxer (1913–1963)

Personal information
- Nationality: British
- Born: John George Harper; 23 June 1913 West Hartlepool, County Durham, England
- Died: 19 December 1963 (aged 50) Blackpool, Lancashire, England
- Weight: Heavyweight

Boxing career
- Stance: Orthodox

Boxing record
- Total fights: 142
- Wins: 95
- Win by KO: 52
- Losses: 40
- Draws: 5

Jack London (born John George Harper; 23 June 1913 – 19 December 1963) was an English heavyweight boxer. He was British and Commonwealth heavyweight champion from 1944 to 1945. His son, who fought as Brian London, also became British and Commonwealth heavyweight champion from 1958 to 1959.

== Early career ==
London was born in Stranton, West Hartlepool, County Durham. He made his professional debut in January 1931, in West Hartlepool, winning by a knockout in the first round. He took the ring name of Jack London, after the American author, who also covered fights for American boxing magazines. London was six feet tall and big framed, with a style that some regarded as crude and cumbersome. He fought most of his early fights in his native North East, whilst continuing to work as a lorry driver.

He did not fight in the capital until October 1932, losing at Blackfriars against Jack O’Malley, an Australian heavyweight due to an injured hand. In November 1933, he fought Ben Foord, later to become British and Commonwealth heavyweight champion himself. London lost on points over ten rounds at the Crystal Palace. In December 1933, he also fought the Commonwealth (Empire) champion, Larry Gains, being knocked out by the Canadian in the second round. In February 1935, he lost another points decision against Ben Foord. In March 1936 London fought the American ex-world-light-heavyweight champion, Tommy Loughran, losing on points over ten rounds. London next had a points win against another American, Obie Walker, and then went to fight in Berlin against Hans Schonrath, gaining another points decision.

London's recent successes against good quality opponents appeared to have put him in line for a title challenge against British heavyweight champion, Tommy Farr, but Farr seemed reluctant to fight him, perhaps because he was not a draw for crowds. In May 1937 London fought the American, Buddy Baer, brother of Max Baer, losing on points over ten rounds. Baer was later to fight Joe Louis twice for the world heavyweight title, losing both fights. When Farr relinquished his heavyweight title, London was ignored and Len Harvey beat Eddie Phillips to take the vacant British heavyweight title in December 1938.

== War ==
War interrupted London's boxing career, and he joined the Royal Air Force, being stationed near Blackpool. London so liked the place that he would later relocate his family there. London continued to fight during the war years but managed only twelve bouts. Len Harvey was still heavyweight champion but decided to challenge for the vacant British and Commonwealth light-heavyweight titles, beating Jock McAvoy on points. He then defended his light-heavyweight titles against Freddie Mills in June 1942 being knocked out in the second round. Harvey promptly retired leaving his heavyweight tiles vacant. London now had his chance.

London fought a 3-round exhibition match for the RAF on 6 March 1940 at RAF Station Hednesford. He fought under his service rank of Corporal Harper against Corporal George James, and autographed programmes as Jack London.

== Heavyweight title ==
London fought an eliminator for the British heavyweight title in March 1943, against Al Robinson, winning by a knockout in the eighth round. The path was open for a title fight between London and Freddie Mills, for the British and Commonwealth titles. The fight was finally arranged for September 1944 at Belle Vue, in Manchester. Mills conceded about three stones in weight but was still 3-1 favourite. Neither of the two was a stylish boxer, and the two men slugged it out over fifteen rounds with London getting a narrow points decision. Mills was to go on to be world light-heavyweight champion.

London had one more non-title fight which he won by a knockout, before defending his titles against Bruce Woodcock. The fight was arranged for July 1945 at White Hart Lane, Tottenham, London. Woodcock was about two stones lighter than London, but was more nimble and was able to evade many of London's attacks, building up an early points lead. London started to come back at him with body punches, but in the sixth round Woodcock caught him with a left to put him down. He got up but was put down twice more, finally being counted out.

== Subsequent career ==
London lost his next fight after losing his titles and briefly retired. However a failed business venture forced him back into the ring. He travelled to Stockholm where he was beaten by Olle Tandberg, then won two fights in South Africa. In 1947 he was beaten in an eliminator for the British heavyweight title.

He continued to fight in the North East, then in 1949 lost an eliminator for the Commonwealth heavyweight title. His last fight was against American, Aaron Wilson at Earls Court in November 1949. He was knocked out in the first round and realised that it was time to retire in earnest.

== Retirement ==
London tried his hand at wrestling for a while, and then became a nightclub manager. He took a great interest in the boxing careers of his two sons John and Brian, and was proud to see Brian become British and Commonwealth champion as he had been. He saw Brian unsuccessfully fight Floyd Patterson for the world heavyweight title in 1959, but died before Brian fought Muhammad Ali for the same title in 1966.

== See also ==
- List of British heavyweight boxing champions

== Sources ==
- boxrec.com
- Ronnie Wharton (2005), Fighting Men of the North, Tempus Publishing Limited, ISBN 0-7524-3551-5

Achievements
Preceded by Len Harvey; Retired	British Heavyweight Champion; Commonwealth Heavyweight Champion; 15 September 1944 – 17 July 1945	Succeeded by Bruce Woodcock
