= Jack Renault =

Canadian boxer (1895-1967)

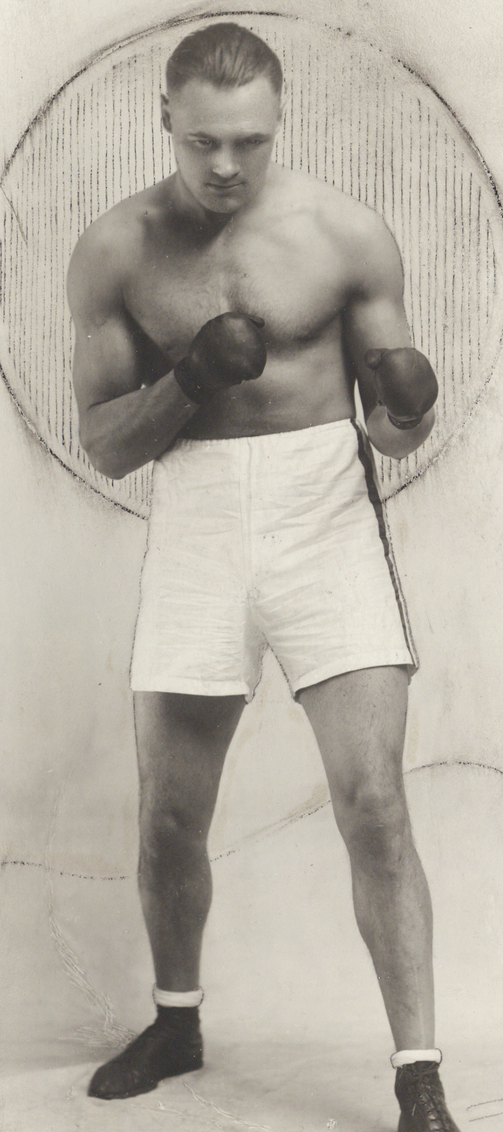

Personal information
- Nationality: (Canada) Canadian
- Born: Léonard Dumoulin; January 18, 1895 Notre-Dame-des-Bois, Quebec, Canada
- Died: July 28, 1967 (aged 72) Sherbrooke, Quebec, Canada
- Occupation: Boxer
- Height: 6 ft 1 in (185cm)
- Weight: Light heavyweight Heavyweight

Boxing career
- Reach: 72 in (183cm)

Boxing record
- Total fights: 101
- Wins: 71
- Win by KO: 37
- Losses: 22
- Draws: 2
- No contests: 6

Jack Renault (born Léonard Dumoulin; January 18, 1895 – July 28, 1967) was a French-Canadian professional heavyweight boxer who competed from 1918 to 1933. He won the Canadian heavyweight boxing championship in 1923.

== Early life ==
Léonard Dumoulin was born in Quebec, Canada, during the mid-1890s.

Dumoulin worked as a Royal Canadian Mounted Police officer before becoming a professional boxer, serving three years as a sergeant.

== Professional boxing career ==
Fighting under the ring name Jack Renault, he made his professional debut in Sherbrooke, Quebec, during the summer of 1918.

Early in his career on August 9, 1919, he fought Arthur Pelkey, who went on to become Canadian heavyweight champion in his next fight. The bout resulted in a no contest verdict. The Quebecer soon relocated to Massachusetts and fought out of New Bedford and Boston under the management of Jim McDonald.

Renault fought veteran Battling Levinsky on May 5, 1920, dropping a 12-round newspaper decision.

=== Bouts with Harry Greb, 1921 ===
He notably fought top light heavyweight contender and future world middleweight champion Harry Greb on two occasions in 1921. The Canadian first met Greb in a main event in his hometown of Pittsburgh in March, holding a size advantage at 6'1" and 187 pounds over Greb's 5'8" and 165 pounds. He then fought him again in Montreal in April 1921, losing both newspaper decisions.

He eventually joined Leo P. Flynn's New York stable and stayed under Flynn's management for almost his entire professional career.

=== Bouts with Billy Miske, 1921-1922 ===
In May 1921 in Atlantic City, he became a sparring partner for Jack Dempsey, who considered him a valuable training mate during his conditioning for Jack Dempsey vs. Georges Carpentier. Dempsey himself said in 1921 that within two or three years, Renault would be among the heavyweight division's top fighters and a dangerous title challenger. Renault later fought Billy Miske on the preliminary card of the Dempsey-Carpentier fight, with the July bout ruled a no contest after eight rounds, though sportswriters called it a draw.

He met Miske for a second time in January 1922 at the Clermont Avenue Skating Rink in Brooklyn, where he was stopped for the first time in his career. Renault got up from a 13th-round knockdown but was then hit with a hard punch that knocked him through the ropes, where he was injured and counted out before he could climb back in. In every fight after that loss, he demonstrated improved form and more effective punching while developing a powerful uppercut in both hands.

Renault took on former U.S. light heavyweight champion Gene Tunney on January 29, 1923. The match held at the Philadelphia Arena was ruled a no contest when referee Frank "Pop" O'Brien ended it in round four, claiming neither boxer was trying. The poor showing led to a temporary ban on heavyweight boxing in Philadelphia.

At the Pioneer Sporting Club in New York on March 9, 1923, he first encountered George Godfrey, knocking him out in round 11. Despite a proposal for the winner to fight Harry Wills, the bout failed to materialize. After the fight, William Muldoon of the New York State Athletic Commission said he would sanction a Firpo-Renault match, and Renault then faced Martin Burke in his first Pittsburgh appearance since meeting Greb.

Renault graced the cover of The Ring magazine in July 1923. He declined Dempsey's invitation to return as his sparring partner during the summer of 1923 in preparation for Jack Dempsey vs. Luis Ángel Firpo.

He faced Fred Fulton twice in 1923. Fulton was disqualified after a foul in the fourth round of their first bout in May at Yankee Stadium. He later knocked out Fulton in the ninth round of a bout at the Boston Arena on October 1, 1923.

=== Taking the Canadian heavyweight championship, October 1923 ===
Renault won the vacant Canadian heavyweight championship on October 10, 1923, at Théâtre Saint-Denis in Montreal, Quebec. After going the distance, he scored a unanimous decision win over Soldier Jones to capture the title before a crowd of 5,276.

In November 1923, he faced Iowa's Floyd Johnson at Madison Square Garden. Before he headed out for the 15th round, manager Leo P. Flynn said to him, "You knock that bird out or don't come back to your corner." He finished Johnson with a knockout in the 15th and final round of the bout. He registered 13 knockouts in 15 contests that year.

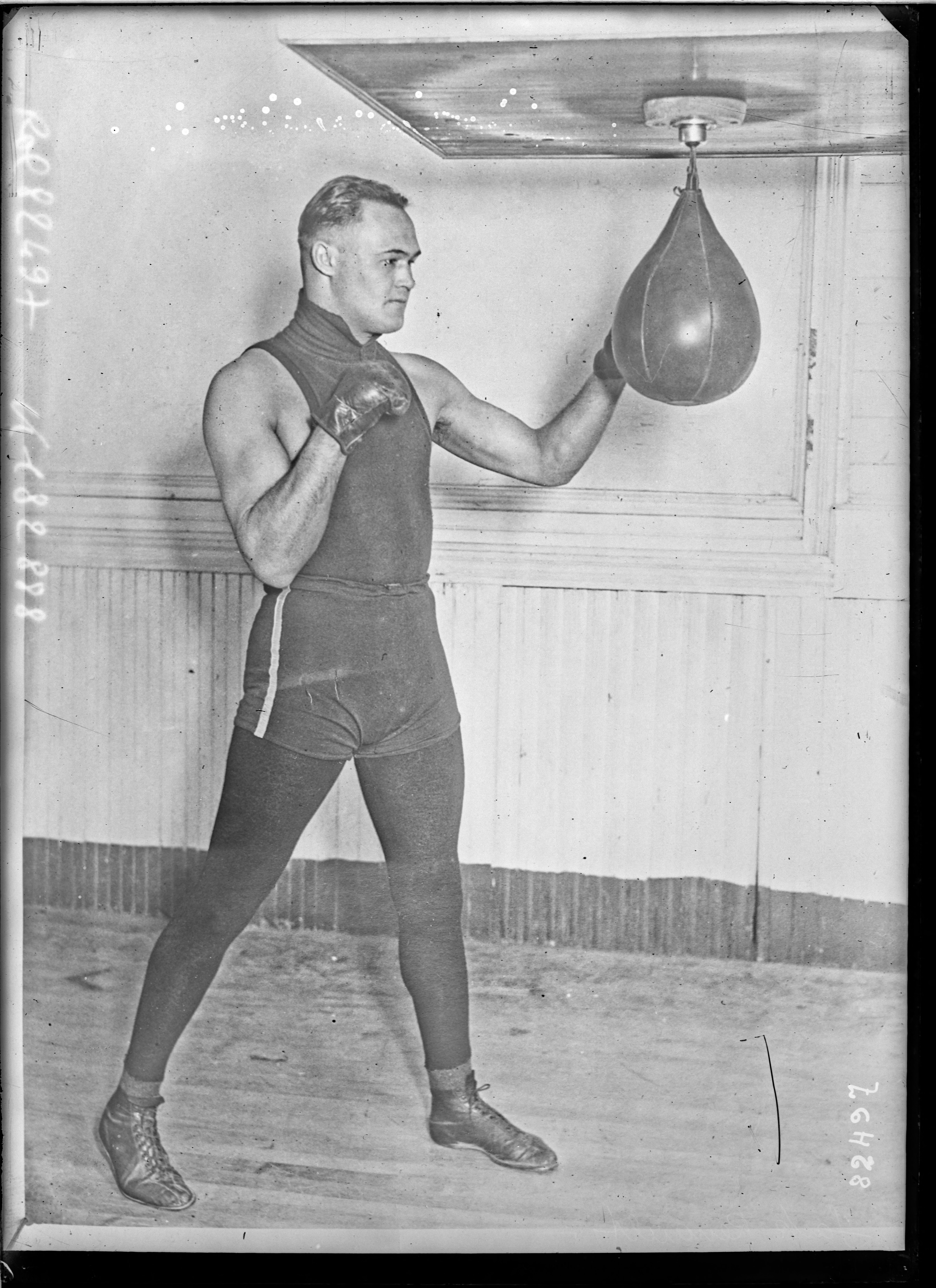
Canadian boxer Jack Renault

He learned from former welterweight champion Jack Britton and received coaching from Kid Norfolk, while sportswriter Damon Runyon took interest in Renault's career and documented his improved fighting style.

On September 8, 1924, his first rematch with George Godfrey drew a record 25,000 fans to Shibe Park, making it the 13th largest outdoor boxing attendance in Philadelphia's boxing history. He secured a decision victory over Godfrey.

He lost a decision to Jack Sharkey at Boston Arena in April 1925, dealing a major blow to his career. Following the loss to Sharkey, he secured a win over Johnny Risko in Cleveland. With two wins over George Godfrey, one by knockout and one by decision, he faced Godfrey for the third time in San Francisco in June 1925, losing over 10 rounds. He bounced back with seven wins in a row, with six ending in stoppages. After defeating Jack League, one of Dempsey's sparring partners, in Tampa, Florida, Renault had by then established himself as a foremost contender for Jack Dempsey's heavyweight crown.

He traveled to Havana, Cuba, for three fights in March 1926. He outpointed Roleaux Saguero, the Cuban light heavyweight and heavyweight champion, on March 10. Renault came in at 197½ pounds compared to Saguero's 175¾. He soon knocked out Marine Tolliver on March 17, then defeated Santiago Esparraguera, who was disqualified in their March 23 bout.

He scored a TKO victory over Sully Montgomery in April 1926 in Saint Louis and then went on to defeat Jack DeMave at Madison Square Garden in New York in May 1926.

Renault ventured into the movie industry, appearing on screen in a boxing match with American actor Richard Dix in Knockout Reilly, before launching a comeback campaign. His return to the ring in Kansas City in July 1927 resulted in an upset defeat to Chilean heavyweight Quintin Romero Rojas, as he appeared rusty following several months working in Hollywood. He redeemed himself by defeating Italian heavyweight Arthur De Kuh at the Garden the following month in August 1927.

He went 10 rounds with former light heavyweight titleholder Jack Delaney in October 1927 before 16,236 fight fans at Madison Square Garden. The fight was the opening round of Tex Rickard's heavyweight elimination tournament, designed to select a suitable opponent for heavyweight champion Gene Tunney in 1928.

On December 25, 1928, he faced Paulino Uzcudun with the Colombian heavyweight championship at stake at the Estadio Versailles in Cali, Colombia. He lost a decision to Uzcudun.

At Ebbets Field in Brooklyn, he was matched up against Young Bob Fitzsimmons, son of the famed world champion Bob Fitzsimmons, on July 17, 1929. He secured the win by outpointing Fitzsimmons after 10 rounds. Two months later, on September 23, 1929, he suffered a loss at the hands of heavyweight contender Ernie Schaaf at the same venue. His next opponent was Tommy Loughran, the former world light heavyweight champion now fighting at heavyweight, and he lost by unanimous decision over 10 rounds in Philadelphia.

=== Canadian heavyweight championship bout with Gains, September 1931 ===
Jack Renault took his second shot at the Canadian heavyweight championship on September 21, 1931, facing reigning titleholder Larry Gains at the Coliseum in Toronto. The 10-round feature bout proved one-sided, with Gains systematically outboxing Renault to win eight of the ten rounds.

He ventured to Australia for two bouts, receiving losses at the hands of Young Stribling at Brisbane Stadium in August 1932 and Alan Campbell at the Theatre Royal in Timaru.

The veteran heavyweight boxer hung up the gloves after his last two fights in 1933 ended in losses. At the time of his retirement, Renault had compiled a professional record of 71–22-2, with 37 wins coming by knockout.

== Professional boxing record ==
101 fights	71 wins	22 losses
By knockout	37	2
By decision	34	20
Draws	2	
No contests	6	

== Filmography ==
Renault made appearances in the films Knockout Reilly in 1927 and Enemies of the Law in 1931.

Year	Title	Role	Notes
1927	Knockout Reilly	Killer Agerra	
1931	Enemies of the Law	Uncredited role	

== Death ==
Jack Renault died on July 28, 1967, in Canada.

Achievements
Preceded by Vacant	Canadian Heavyweight Champion; October 10, 1923 – Vacated	Succeeded by Vacant
