= Ben Foord =

South African boxer (1913–1942)

Personal information
- Nationality: South African
- Born: Benjamin Foord; 21 January 1913 Vrede, Union of South Africa
- Died: 29 September 1942 (aged 29)
- Height: 6 ft 2 1/2 in (1.89 m)
- Weight: light heavy/cruiser/heavyweight

Boxing career

Boxing record
- Total fights: 59
- Wins: 40 (KO 22)
- Losses: 15 (KO 5)
- Draws: 4

Benjamin Foord (21 January 1913 – 29 September 1942) was a South African professional mixed class boxer of the 1930s and 1940s, who won the South African heavyweight title, British Boxing Board of Control (BBBoFC) British heavyweight title, and British Empire heavyweight title, his professional fighting weight varied from 170 lb (77 kg; 12 st 2 lb), i.e. Light heavyweight to 216 lb (98.0 kg; 15 st 6.0 lb), i.e. Heavyweight. Foord died on 29 September 1942, aged 29 years, when he accidentally shot himself.

== Boxing career ==
=== Professional ===
Ben Foord's first professional boxing bout was a KO victory over Billy Miller at the Town Hall, Durban on 4 June 1932. This was followed by fights including; six wins, one defeat, two draws, then a points victory over, a points defeat by, and a points victory over Clyde Chastain from the USA at City Hall, in Johannesburg on 4 February 1933, 4 March 1933, and 8 April 1933. Foord then travelled to the United Kingdom, winning a points victory over Vicente Parrile from Argentina at Royal Albert Hall, London on 29 May 1933. Flowed by two wins, then a points win over Hans Schoenrath of Germany at the Royal Albert Hall on 30 October 1933. Another two more wins, one defeat, Foord then travelled home to South Africa, with a knockout win over Willie Storm for the vacant South African heavyweight boxing heavyweight title at City Hall, Cape Town on 25 June 1934. Next a win, then a draw with Presidio Pavesi from Italy at Wanderers Stadium, Johannesburg on 8 September 1934, Foord then travelled back to the UK, with a win, then a draw with Eddie Wenstob of Canada at Empire Pool, London on 4 February 1935.

After a TKO victory over Harry Staal from the Netherlands at Granby Halls, Leicester on 25 March 1935. Foord won a TKO victory over Harry Staal at Granby Halls, Leicester on 18 May 1935. He then lost a points defeat to Gunnar Bärlund of Finland at Wembley Stadium, London on 25 June 1935. Flowed by three more wins, then a retirement victory over Claudio Villar of (Spain) at Royal Albert Hall, London on 23 September 1935. He then lost a TKO to Maurice Strickland from New Zealand at Empire Pool, Wembley on 8 October 1935.

Next a points victory over Larry Gains of Canada at Granby Halls, Leicester on 25 November 1935. Followed by a points defeat by Roy Lazer from the USA at Royal Albert Hall, in London on 16 December 1935. Next another points victory over Roy Lazer at Granby Halls, Leicester on 20 January 1936. He then had a points victory over Tommy Loughran from USA at Granby Halls, Leicester on 10 February 1936. Next a points victory over Larry Gains from Canada at Granby Halls, Leicester on 9 March 1936.

His next fight was a knockout victory over George Cook from Australia at White City Stadium, Cardiff on 6 June 1936. A TKO victory over Jack Petersen for the BBBoFC, at Welford Road Stadium, Leicester on 17 August 1936. Foord then scored a points defeat by Walter Neusel from Germany at Harringay Arena, London on 18 November 1936. Next he scored another a points victory over Tommy Farr defending the (BBBoFC) at Harringay Arena, London on 15 March 1937. Another TKO defeat by Max Baer from the USA at Harringay Arena on 27 May 1937. Then a points defeat by Max Schmeling of Germany at Hanseatenhalle, Hamburg, Germany on 30 January 1938. Then a disqualification defeat by Walter Neusel of Germany at Hanseatenhalle, Hamburg, Germany on 16 April 1938.

He then had two more wins, followed by two defeats, Foord then travelled back home to South Africa, with a points win over Buck Everett of the USA at Wembley Ice Rink, Johannesburg on 5 August 1939. Foord then lost by points to Tommy Bensch for the (BBBoFC) at City Hall, Johannesburg on 20 January 1940. Ben Foord's final professional boxing bout was a points victory over Tom Porter at City Hall in Johannesburg on 15 June 1940.

A British heavyweight title, and a British Empire heavyweight title.

== Family ==
Ben Foord's marriage to Phyllis M. (née Souter) was registered during October→December 1937 in Upton-upon-Severn district. He was the brother of the boxer Joe Foord.

== Death ==
After retiring from boxing, Foord joined the army. While at home on leave, he was playing a practical joke by sneaking up on his wife Phyllis with a pistol and pretending to be a desperado. Foord then attempted gunspinning in the American frontier style and accidentally shot himself in the face, killing himself.
