= Harry Persson (boxer) =

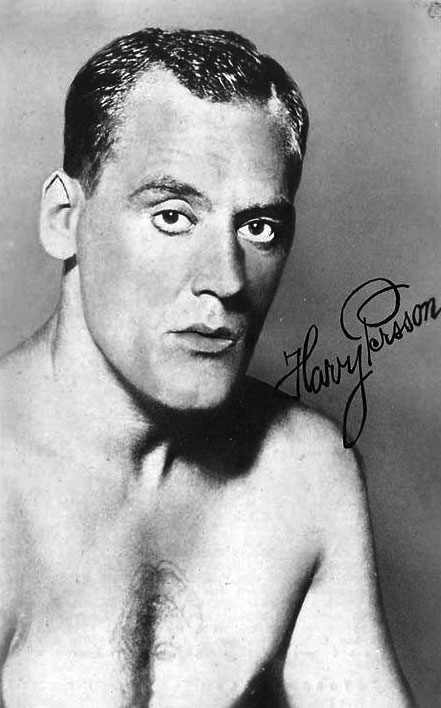
- Harry Persson in the mid 1920's

Personal information
- Nickname: The Slugging Stonemason
- Nationality: Swedish
- Born: 24 September 1898 Stockholm, Sweden
- Died: 1 October 1979 (aged 81) Solna, Sweden
- Height: 6 ft 1 in (185 cm)
- Weight: Heavyweight

Boxing career
- Stance: Orthodox

Boxing record
- Total fights: 41
- Wins: 32
- Win by KO: 17
- Losses: 5
- Draws: 4

Harry Persson (24 September 1898 – 1 October 1979), known as HP, was a Swedish heavyweight professional boxer and actor, who was the Scandinavian and European champion. Together with Arne Borg, Harry Persson was one of the biggest Swedish sports stars of the 1920s.

== Biography ==
Born in Stockholm, in 1914, Persson grew up in Vasastaden. He enlisted in Västmanland's regiment and then worked as a paver, where he built up the strength for which he became known in the ring. He first made his name as a footballer, playing as a forward, but was introduced to boxing by another footballer/boxer, Martin Tankard. As an amateur, competing for Solna BK, Persson won all of his eleven fights, nine by knockout, but in his last amateur fight he broke his thumb, leading him to miss the national final and he and was subsequently unable to box for a year. He subsequently decided to turn professional through a showcase organized by Bro IK in Upplands-Bro.

Persson made his professional debut on 14 February 1923, stopping Emil Andreasen in the ninth round to take the Scandinavian heavyweight title. He successfully defended it a month later, knocking out Hans Jorgensen in the first round. By the end of 1925 he had built up a record of 19 wins, including victories over Giuseppe Spalla, Harry Reeve, Belgian champion Jack Humbeeck, and Larry Gains, 1 draw, and a single defeat at the hands of Piet van der Veer.

Persson also worked as an actor. After a small role in the 1923 film Old Street Carnival, he starred as Harry Boman in William Larsson's 1925 film För hemmet och flickan (For Home and Girl). In a play on his initials, he also starred in an advertisement for HP Sauce.

On 14 June 1926 in London he knocked out Englishman Phil Scott in the eleventh round, becoming EBU European heavyweight champion. After that, Persson was considered as a possible challenger to Jack Dempsey for the world title.

He then travelled to the USA in 1926 for a series of six fights, in the hope of getting a shot at Dempsey, winning the first three, including an undercard fight in Philadelphia on 23 September 1926 where Gene Tunney surprisingly defeated Jack Dempsey. On the same card, Persson knocked out Sgt Jack Adams in the fourth round. Persson refused to switch from his Swedish manager to an American, and the rest of his fights were marred by corruption. In the match against Bud Gorman on 1 November 1926 in New York, Persson lost on a controversial disqualification due to 'low' blows; Gorman had reportedly lifted his shorts high over his abdomen. He won the rematch in Sweden the following year with a TKO at the start of the fifth round. The preparation for the fight, and the fight itself were filmed and released cinematically as Harry Persson - Bud Gorman. Two further fights in the US, another controversial defeat, this time to Pat McCarthy, followed by a one-sided loss to Jim Maloney, led him to return disillusioned to Sweden.

After remaining unbeaten in his first eleven fights back in Sweden, he lost by first round technical knockout on 23 August 1931 against the Norwegian Otto von Porat. Persson announced his retirement from boxing a few days after the fight, but returned two years later for three exhibition fights, before retiring for good in 1935.

Harry Persson was the half-brother of Erik "Lillis" Persson, Swedish national bandy, ice hockey and football player.

He died in Solna parish on 1 October 1979, after spending the last seven years of his life in a sanitarium. Persson is buried at Norra burial ground in Stockholm.

In 1990 an opera was commissioned by the Royal Opera House, based on Persson's life: HP - folklig opera om ett boxaröde with music by Lars-Åke Franke-Blom, and libretto by Torbjorn Savfe.

== Bibliography ==
- My Shadow Boxing Method (1924) (probably ghost-written )
- 10 Years in the Ring. How I progressed from unemployed stonemason to Scandinavian heavyweight champion (1933) (ghostwritten by Henry Eidmark)

== Filmography ==
- 1923 - Old Street Carnival, feature film, small role as boxer
- 1925 - For Home and Girl, in the male lead, as Harry Boman
- 1927 - Harry Persson - Bud Gorman, match film incl. preparation for match
- 1932 - In Yellow and Blue, as himself and statistic role
- 1935 - The Guys in the 57th, feature films, minor role
- 1958 - Jazzgossen, cut from the match against Bud Gorman
