= Jack London (fashion label) =

- Company type: Privately held
- Industry: Men's fashion
- Founded: 2008
- Headquarters: Melbourne, Australia
- Area served: Worldwide
- Products: Menswear
- Website: Official website

Jack London was an Australian men's fashion label founded in 2008. Part of the Factory X group of brands including Alannah Hill, Gorman and Dangerfield, Jack London had a number of stores across Australia, as well as concession stores in select Myer department stores. Jack London is not named after the American author Jack London, but rather the name comes from the brand's desire to emulate the London designers of the 1960s.

All physical retail stores closed in August 2021, and the brand operated purely online until its closure in September 2025 to facilitate a final liquidation sale.
