= Wishaw railway station =

Railway station in North Lanarkshire, Scotland

Wishaw
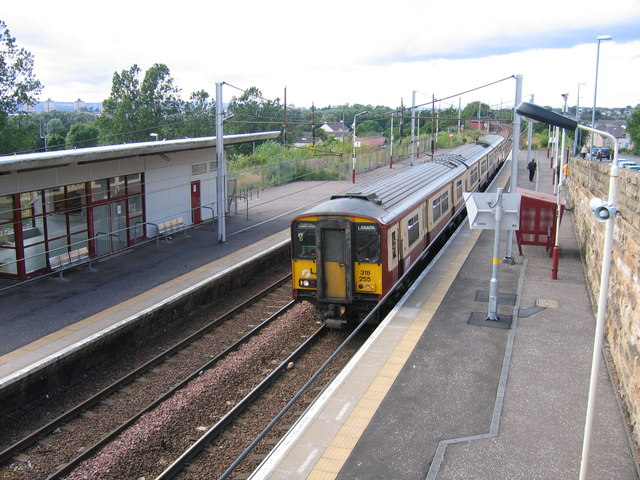

General information
- Location: Wishaw, North Lanarkshire, Scotland
- Coordinates: 55.7721°N 3.9261°W
- Grid reference: NS792548
- Manager: ScotRail
- Platforms: 2

Other information
- Station code: WSH

History
- Original company: Caledonian Railway
- Post-grouping: London Midland and Scottish Railway

Key dates
- 1 June 1880: Opened as Wishaw Central
- 14 June 1965: Renamed Wishaw

Passengers
- 2021/22: ▲0.224 million
- 2022/23: ▲0.306 million
- 2023/24: ▲0.384 million
- 2024/25: ▲0.405 million
- 2025/26: ▲0.437 million
Location
Notes
- Passenger statistics from the Office of Rail and Road

Wishaw railway station serves the town of Wishaw, in North Lanarkshire, Scotland. The station is managed by ScotRail and lies on the Wishaw Deviation Line, just south of the single tracked link line which connects to the West Coast Main Line (WCML) at Shieldmuir.

== History ==
The station opened on 1 June 1880, along with the Whishaw Deviation (Caledonian Railway) from Law Junction to Holytown. There were two long platforms, with a bay at the north end of the northbound platform. A goods yard lay to the east, with a signal box on the southbound platform.

It was first known as Wishaw Central until the closure of Wishaw South, sited nearby on the WCML, in 1958.

=== Former service patterns ===
Up until the electrification of the WCML through to Glasgow Central in 1974, Wishaw was served by an hourly diesel service from Lanark to Glasgow Central High Level, alternating between services via Holytown/Hamilton and Bellshill.

Between 1974 and 1979, an hourly electric service was provided between Glasgow Central High Level, running non-stop to Motherwell.

From 1979 until 2001, an hourly electric service was provided Monday to Saturday between Lanark and Milngavie running via Motherwell and Bellshill. The service was initially non-stop to Motherwell; however, in 1987, a new intermediate station was opened at Shieldmuir. An hourly Sunday service was introduced in 1997.

From 2001 to 2014, the following general off-peak service pattern was in place, in trains per hour (tph), by a mixture of Class 318 and Class 320 units:

- 1tph between Lanark to Dalmuir, via Bellshill, Glasgow Central and Yoker
- 1tph between Lanark to Milngavie, via Hamilton Central and Glasgow Central.

== Facilities ==
The main station building lies on the northbound platform. There is a 25-space car park and ticket office staffed from Monday to Saturday.

== Services ==
ScotRail operates the following general off-peak service pattern, in trains per hour (tph):

- 2 tph to Glasgow Central
- 2 tph to Lanark
- 1 tp2h to Edinburgh Waverley.

A recast of the Argyle Line timetable, in the wake of the Whifflet Line electrification, saw some significant changes to the service pattern. All services to Motherwell and Glasgow Central now run via Shieldmuir and Bellshill, rather than alternating via this route and Hamilton Central; they also now terminate at Central High Level rather than running through to Partick and beyond.

The line is used heavily by freight services, with several Freightliner container trains per day from the nearby Coatbridge terminal to destinations in the south of England such as the Port of Felixstowe and Southampton; it is also used by services to the Mossend freight terminal.

| Preceding station | National Rail | Following station |
|---|---|---|
| Carluke | ScotRail; Argyle Line | Holytown |
| Carluke | ScotRail; Argyle Line | Shieldmuir |
| Carluke | ScotRail; North Berwick Line | Motherwell |
| | Historical railways | |
| Overtown; Line open; Station closed | Caledonian Railway; Wishaw Deviation Line | Flemington; Line and Station open |
