= Morningside railway station =

Morningside railway station may refer to:

- Morningside railway station, Auckland, in New Zealand
- Morningside railway station (Caledonian), a disused station on the Wishaw and Coltness Railway in North Lanarkshire, Scotland
- Morningside railway station (Lanarkshire), a disused station on the Wilsontown, Morningside and Coltness Railway in North Lanarkshire, Scotland
- Morningside railway station, Queensland, in Brisbane, Australia
- Morningside Road railway station, a disused station in Edinburgh, Scotland
