= Len Johnson (boxer) =

British boxer (1902–1974)

- Johnson at Prescot in 1936

Personal information
- Nicknames: Len; English Flash
- Born: Leonard Benker Johnson; 22 October 1902 Clayton, Manchester, England
- Died: 28 September 1974 (aged 71) Oldham, Greater Manchester, England
- Height: 6 ft 1 in (185 cm)
- Weight: Welterweight; Middleweight; Light-heavyweight; Heavyweight

Boxing career
- Reach: 74 1/2 in (189 cm)
- Stance: Orthodox

Boxing record
- Total fights: 135
- Wins: 96
- Win by KO: 37
- Losses: 32
- Draws: 7

Leonard Benker Johnson (22 October 1902 – 28 September 1974), known simply as Len among his admirers, and dubbed "Len Johnson" by the press, was a British boxer who competed from 1920 to 1933. He held the British Empire middleweight title, the first non-white boxer to hold a major title during the British colour bar era, de facto reigning from 20 February 1926 to 12 July 1926. He also held the Northern Area championships at middleweight and light-heavyweight, respectively. A strategic and intelligent boxer, Johnson was considered to be one of the best middleweights of his era. He was known for his exceptional boxing skill, using an educated left-hand, as well a slippery defence that made him difficult to hit, while leaving his features largely unmarked throughout his thirteen-year career. Additionally, Johnson possessed a very long reach and rather good height.

Johnson was regarded as one of the greatest middleweight boxers of his generation in the years between the world wars. As an amateur, Johnson learnt the fundamentals of boxing in the boxing booths of Bill Moore and Bert Hughes. After turning professional later in 1920, he defeated current and former champions, (Note: From 17 April 1920, Johnson beat several reigning champions of Europe: he drew with Irish welterweight champion Pat McAllister; defeated the light-heavyweight champion of Holland, Herman van 't Hof; Frank Briscot, the middleweight champion of Belgium; Piet Brand, the middleweight champion of Holland, and Ignacio Ara, the middleweight champion of Spain; while defeating future and former champions of Europe, as well as world title challengers such as Gipsy Daniels, Jack London, George West, and Ted Moore; also including future Australian heavyweight champion Tiger Jack Payne, and former Australian middleweight champions Alf Stewart, and Tommy Uren.) including former world welterweight champion Ted "Kid" Lewis in 1925. Due to then Home Secretary Winston Churchill's decision in 1911 to support a colour bar, he was banned from competing at both the Royal Albert Hall and National Sporting Club. Additionally, the British Boxing Board of Control would not sanction a championship bout with Johnson for the Lonsdale Belt, due to their Rule 24, which stated that title contestants "[...] must have two white parents", though despite this he defeated Harry Collins in Australia for the middleweight championship of the British Empire in 1926. Johnson became famous in Britain for his impressive victories, defeating European and British middleweight champion Roland Todd in 1927. In the same year, he also defeated future middleweight champion Len Harvey, and rounded up the decade thrashing European middleweight champion Leone Jaccovacci in 1928 and European light-heavyweight champion Michele Bonaglia in 1929.

Johnson was a major boxing figure of the mid-20th century Britain, and though he never held any titles, (Note: On 20 February 1926, Johnson's win over Harry Collins for the middleweight championship of the British Empire was recognised in Australia, but not by the National Sporting Club, British Boxing Board of Control or other authorities in Britain.) he was important activist in the labour movement in Manchester in the 1940s and 1950s. Following the Second World War, Johnson joined the Communist Party of Great Britain (CPGB) and was a key member until his death. He was a co-founder of the New International Club in Manchester, which provided a vehicle for black political and social self-organisation in the city and campaigning against racism at home and abroad, including organising a concert and a rally featuring his hero Paul Robeson in support of the Trenton Six, which were both attended by 10,000 people. He was instrumental in influencing the dissolving the British colour bar in 1947, wherein Dick Turpin became Britain's first Black boxing champion in 1948; the decolonisation of Africa taking place in the 1950s to 1970s, with Ghana becoming the first sub-Saharan African country to gain its independence from European powers, led by Kwame Nkrumah, a delegate alongside Johnson at the 5th Pan-African Congress; and the implementation of the Race Relations Act 1965, making racial discrimination in public places unlawful.

== Early life ==
Leonard Benker Johnson was born on 22 October 1902 in Clayton, Manchester, England, in the suburbs of Cottonopolis; he was the first child of Margaret (née Maher) and William Benker Johnson. He was born to an Irish mother and a Sierra Leone Creole father, making him mixed-race; and had two brothers, Albert and William, who were professional boxers, and one sister, Doris. His mother, Margaret, a pinafore machinist, was born in north Manchester; she was of Irish descent, with both her parents from Ireland. Johnson's maternal grandfather, William, was from Roscrea, County Tipperary. Johnson described his mother as "Irish and proud of it", and spoke of her vicious treatment, such as her being facially disfigured after a brutal racist street attack in which she was targeted for being the wife of a black man. Johnson's father, William, served with the British Army during the First World War, and worked for Elder Dempster Lines; he was a merchant seaman, boxer, and mechanical engineer from Sierra Leone, who had settled in Manchester after marrying Margaret. Though William was a middleweight, he claimed the heavyweight championship of the North of England in 1903, by beating Jack Lamb, who weighed 196 lbs, in two-rounds at Stalybridge, Manchester.

His earliest home was at 12 Barnabus Street in Clayton, with his family lodging with Sal Connell, and his wife. He stated that the Connell's were like parents to his mother and surrogate grandparents to him. The family left Manchester for Leeds, where his father established a travelling boxing booth. He attended Jack Lane School and the Cockburn schools in Leeds. However, the outbreak of World War I soon brought the family back to Manchester, which would eventually lead to a young Johnson leaving school to begin to work as a foundryman at Crossley. Johnson grew up in a multi-cultural childhood with fellow immigrants of Jewish, Irish, Italian, and Yemeni background. Despite the ethnic and racial diversity that could be found in Manchester during the early 1900s, the family experienced much hostility and violence, with Johnson recalling being called ‘nigger lips’ and ‘Sambo’ at secondary school.

== Amateur career ==
In 1904, his father, William, took him his first boxing booth, albeit at the age of two, where he was announced by his father as "Len Johnson the Youngest Boxer in the World". In 1921, at the age of 19, Johnson was involved in a scuffle with co-worker at Crossley before being separated by their respective fathers. Recognising some talent, his father, William, decided to enter him in some bouts at a hall on the heavily working-class Ashton Old Road. Johnson and his brothers were taken to Alhambra Amateur Boxing Club in Openshaw, Manchester, which was run by former fighter Jack Smith, who Johnson had impressed. Johnson was fascinated by the sparring at Alhambra, in which he remarked "They didn't cover their faces when an opponent hit them in the eye, they snorted and went in to retaliate." It was during this period he met Bill Moore, who got him into his boxing booth and made Johnson work, where he eventually fought Moore's toughest fighter: Sam Minto. Johnson later spoke of his victory over Minto whilst remarking, "That's the first stage in a boxer finding: his confidence. So I have a great debt owing to [Moore]."

A few weeks after his third and forth amateur losses, he was persuaded by friends to enter a competition at a boxing booth at Gorton Fair, run by Bert Hughes. Hughes was impressed and offered Johnson a job which lasted six months, during which time Johnson greatly improved his boxing skills and stamina. Johnson had little knowledge of how to box, though he trained as best he could; with his mother, Margaret, provided an old clothes line which he skipped with, and fashioning him a pair of boxing shorts.

== Professional career ==
=== Early years ===
On 17 April 1920, Johnson made his professional boxing debut at age 17, under the tutelage of Fred Hall. He suffered his first loss to Young Marshall at the Alhambra Theatre in Openshaw, Manchester, and subsequently a fourth-round knockout by Marshall in his second fight at the Free Trade Hall, a result which led to Johnson's eventual move to the booths of Bert Hughes. His third fight took place at the Alhambra Theatre on 1 January 1921. His opponent was fellow local teenager Jerry Hogan, whom Johnson knocked out in the third-round, to which Johnson remarked "[Hogan] shoved his chin on to my hand and down he went for the count. I really had no idea how I knocked him out!" Although Johnson had started his professional career in 1920, he had fought in boxing booths before turning professional. Johnson used the boxing booths for practice and in particular the booths of Bill Moore, with whom Johnson had nine fights for and won seven of them in Manchester, including that of hotly tipped Eddie Pearson on 31 January 1922, winning by a second-round stoppage. These early fights were not without trials, as Johnson had lost seven additional fights by way of points-decision, including his first fight abroad which was a points defeat by Frithjof Hansen in Copenhagen, Denmark.

After the Hansen loss, Johnson returned to England and knocked Horace Jackson in the fourth-round at Drill Hall, Middlesbrough on 18 December, though he later suffered a close points-decision loss to Charlie Smith. From 9 February 1923, he remained undefeated with several encounters with Lonz Webster, Billy Pritchard, and Ned Dixon, until he suffered a loss to Kid Moose on 30 June. On 6 July 1923, at the Scottish Boxing Stadium, Johnson faced ex-Seaman, Jimmy Cox, in which from the first bell the pace was keen, with the decision eventually going to Johnson, who was the cleverer man, though lost another points-decision to Kid Moose shortly after. Johnson then had seven more fights in the space of three months, defeating Percy Calladine, Bobby Lees, the Irish welterweight champion Pat McAllister, Ernie McCabe, Johnny Bee, Lonz Webster, and Tom Plant all before rematching Johnny Bee. On 17 December 1923, with Albert Rogers barred by medical decree from meeting Johnson, Johnny Bee was called upon to oppose him at the Ring at catchweight, which resulted Johnson losing to Bee via points-decision.

On 7 January 1924, after defeating Bill Bates, Albert Brown, and Harry Lem, he avenged one of his previous losses as he defeated Kid Moose, at the Olympia, Middlesbrough. Several days later, on 12 January, Johnson took on Herman van 't Hof, though suffering his first knockout loss in four years when van 't Hof floored twice with rights to the jaw in the eighth-round; the bell saved Johnson as he went down for a third time, which resulted in one of his seconds pulling him out. On 14 January, Johnson returned to form in his points victory over former Midlands welterweight champion Jim Slater, and almost knocked him out later in the thirteenth-round.

He then suffered three narrow decision losses: firstly to Billy Pritchard on 29 January, and again on 7 February, where he lost controversially on points to Canadian Kid Moose at the Liverpool Stadium at catchweight, despite nearly every punch he delivered finding Moose. His third loss of that time was a points loss to Billy Farmer, which reportedly led to Johnson furiously entering Farmer's changing-room, after the bout, to say: "You beat me? Wat will my father say?". He then had six more fights in the space of one month, defeating Jimmy McDonald (1–3–0), Charlie Woodman (1–12–0), Lonz Webster (4–8–1), Joe Bloomfield (26–6–4), Bert Brown (0–1–1), and former BUI Irish welterweight champion Pat McAllister (68–57–32) by 30 March. On 24 April 1924, Johnson boxed fifteen rounds at Premierland against future Flanders middleweight champion Ernest Tyncke, and was awarded a points-decision by referee Charles Barnett. He returned to the ring, on 11 May, to face Ted Coveney at the National Sporting Club, Leeds, which resulted in Johnson securing another points-decision.

On 12 June, Johnson deputised Billy Mattick at short notice to face former European welterweight champion Billy Mack (30–8–4) at Liverpool Stadium, where he suffered a decision loss when referee Tom Gamble awarded the fight to Mack. Mack was at a disadvantage in height and reach, and in the opening rounds he had to spring at his man to get home a head punch. Johnson boxed in a cool and clever style, using his straight left to the face in disconcerting fashion. About the middle round, Johnson was holding the lead, but thenceforward the honours went in Mack's favour. After his points loss to Mack, Johnson returned to defeat Jack Phoenix at Croke Park, Dublin on 21 June.

On 26 June 1924, Johnson met Herman van 't Hof for the second time over fifteen rounds at 160 pounds at Premierland, Whitechapel, wherein he lost controversially via a points decision awarded by referee Moss Deyong. Johnson suffered as the result of a poor verdict, as he outpointed Hof for ten of the fifteen rounds. On 14 July, Johnson returned to the ring to face Johnny Brown of Hamilton (25–2–1) at catchweight at the Scottish Stadium, Govan. The contest was scheduled for fifteen rounds, and eventually they came together for a rally at close quarters, Brown forcing Johnson on to the ropes, and then finding the latter's chin uncovered he hooked him with a right, and Johnson dropped to the floor. Johnson seemed very distressed, and when the eight had been counted the bell went for the end of the round. Johnson was carried to his corner and before the interval had expired the towel came in from his corner, Brown thus winning via a referee-technical decision.

Johnson returned on 7 August to secure a controversial draw against Frank Burns awarded by referee Moss Deyong, although he won every round by a large margin. In addition, too, he had Burns almost out in round-fifteen, although it must be said he once hit him low. Burns fought an uphill fight with atmost gameness but was never clever enough. On 19 August, he followed the draw with a questionable points-decision loss against European welterweight champion Piet Hobin in Rubenspaleis, Belgium, and a lost decision to Frank Fowler at the Festival Concert Rooms on 29 September. It was confirmed that Johnson would rematch Ted Coveney on 1 November, where Johnson was awarded the points-decision at the Holmeside Stadium. After the Coveney rematch, an accident sustained while driving prevented middleweight Fred Davies meeting Tommy Moran over fifteen-rounds on 11 November. However, Johnson deputised Moran and enjoyed all the advantages physically against Moran, and knocked him out in the fourth-round. A few days later, on 15 November, he secured a disqualifaction-victory against welterweight Pat Logue, as Johnson was hit low in the second-round, and this occurred once again in the third-round, which resulted in the referee disqualifying Logue.

He then had three more fights in the space of December, defeating Pat McAllister, Johnny Bee, though only to be disqualified in the seventh-round for an accidental low blow against Billy Cook, despite knocking Cook down four times prior. After the disqualification loss, in January 1925, Johnson recovered with a fifth-round knockout of Ernie Millson, who was deputised over Marine Bill Trinder, and a points-decision over former Australian middleweight champion Charlie Ring in the following month.

=== Rising up the ranks ===
==== Johnson vs Todd I ====
By 7 February, contracts had been signed for Johnson to meet former European middleweight champion Roland Todd (78–9–3) at King's Hall, Manchester for twenty-rounds. At the weigh-in, Johnson, 22 at the time of the fight, was inside the stipulated weight limit of 158 pounds; though Todd, 25, was slightly above 160 pounds. At that point in time, the crowd of 7,000 that attended was the largest crowd that had ever attended a boxing match in Manchester. Todd was beaten for the first time in England since his return from America, when Johnson gained the verdict on points, awarded by referee Joe Palmer on 23 February. Despite Todd being the current British and Commonwealth middleweight champion, the titles were not at stake for Johnson as the contest was at catchweight, and the National Sporting Club did not consider Johnson to be an Englishman.

It was a battle of defences, in which the champion is a past master, but Johnson was very little behind his rival in this respect; in fact, Todd was sometime before he showed his old-time skill. Johnson used his feet well and jumped in to score points to the head and body. In the third-round, Todd cleverly avoided Johnson and sent a couple of stiff-rights to the chin. In round-ten, Todd seemed to have gained a lead, though Johnson stood up to his work and displayed capital defensive tactics and made things awkward for Todd, who was cautioned in round-eleven. Johnson used his left-hand cleverly and brought blood from Todd, whose lead was wiped off. Johnson had a narrow escape in the fifteenth-round, when Todd clipped him won the chin and send him reeling, to which Todd forced matters. The last two-rounds went to Johnson, who met and exchanged with Todd in the centre of the ring. The verdict of referee, Palmer, had caused considerable surprise as no one believed that reigning British and Commonwealth champion could possibly lose to Johnson, with Todd being a pronounced favourite, and odds being freely offered against Johnson. Both fighters had alluded to a potential rematch in the future.

Johnson returned on 30 March 1925, to secure a draw with Billy Farmer, before knocking out and avenging his loss to Billy Pritchard in the thirteenth-round to in the inaugural Northern Area middleweight title at the Hulme Town Hall. After winning the Northern title, he defeated Joe Bloomfield via points-decision, and then secured a draw with Fred Davies. He then had four more fights in the space of two months, defeating via second-round knockout, Albert Rogers (21–3–0), followed by Ernest Tyncke (33–14–5), and avenging his loss to the light-heavyweight champion of Holland, Herman van 't Hof (42–6–2). Of the van 't Hof fight, Johnson objected to the appointment of referee, Moss Deyong, due to Deyong's controversial judgement in his second encounter with van 't Hof, and the draw against Frank Burns, thus Ted Broadribb took charge. After outpointing van 't Hof, Billy Mack, who defeated Johnson, offered a rematch for £100 a-side. He then rematched and defeated Charlie Ring (24–8–3), whom had beaten many of Britain's finest light-heavyweights, via points-decision.

==== Johnson vs Briscot ====
On 31 August 1925, Johnson easily outpointed Frank Briscot, the middleweight champion of Belgium, at The Ring. Johnson was described by The Leeds Intelligencer as "[showing] himself a master of boxing skill", and as a "boxing wizard" by Shields Daily News. At the official weigh-in, a day before the fight, Briscot tipped the scales at 162 lbs, while Johnson weighed a couple of pounds heavier. Briscot made many determined attempts to force the fighting during the opening round. Johnson was wonderfully cool under the rushes of his rival, and left after left flashed out into Briscot's face. Just before the gong sounded, a right hook to the jaw followed immediately, but an upper cut from the same hand had the Belgian shaky on his legs. Johnson scored strongly with his left in the next meeting but he twice missed badly when trying for a knockout to the jaw with his right. Briscot attacked fiercely but with the exception of a few body blows he met with no success. In the third and fourth, Johnson made great play with his right and is rival had to take very severe punishment. Briscot once got him on the side of the head with a fierce right swing. For three rounds, the Belgian fought on doggedly under great difficulties, but although he was bleeding from the nose and lips, he was still strong and full of fight. He proved this in the eighth round, when he drove Johnson with some heavy swings twice or three of which reached the jaw. Johnson was hard pressed for a couple of rounds. Briscot was again severely punished during the eleventh, but remained on his feet to the end of the fight. He had been outclassed, but his courage granted him an ovation as he left the ring.

==== Johnson vs Todd II ====
On 16 August 1925, The Sunday Mirror announced that Johnson would face Roland Todd at Belle Vue, Manchester at the end of September. Additionally, Hull Daily Mail announced the match as being agreed upon, with the contest will be deprived of championship status, albeit at the middleweight limit; the return match will be on 21 September, with Eugene Corri as referee. On 5 September 1925, The Liverpool Echo reported that Johnson would face former European middleweight champion, Roland Todd in Manchester on 25 September. On 25 September 1925, with a crowd of over 6,000, Johnson defeated Todd, the middleweight champion of Great Britain, on points at Belle Vue, Manchester. Todd, who was strongly fancied, was favoured six to four and had former middleweight champion Gus Platts in his corner. Both Johnson and Todd had successfully passed the scales at the weigh-in earlier that very day. In the initial round, Todd was first to score twice in succession with a flashing straight left. Afterwards, Johnson levelled matters by using both hands to the both. Round two distinctly favoured Todd, who clipped his opponent on the jaw with the right, and scored freely with the left, gaining a nice advantage. Both men exhibited great coolness, and a bout of in-fighting followed in the third, when Todd was twice shaken by a couple of right hooks to the face. Later, champion Todd retaliated with interest by bringing his left nicely into play, and scoring freely in a rally at close quarters. In this round, Johnson, whose work had been exceptionally clever, opened a cut over Todd's left eye with his hard straight hitting with the left glove. The fifth round was exceptionally interesting, Todd's left leads being cleverly stopped by Johnson who, in turn, scored with a stiff blow to the mouth. Subsequently, Todd again rallied strongly, and showing all his old-time cleverness in defence, took the round by a good margin. Johnson's blows were powerfully delivered for the most part, but try as he would with his heavy right swings, he generally failed to connect owing to the clever defensive work of the champion. Up to round ten, Todd quite monopolised the scoring, with his experience standing him in good stead, and he was rarely at home when Johnson tried to launch an attack. At the end of the tenth, Todd held a nice lead on points, but at this stage the boxing took a wonderful turn. Todd was obviously tiring rapidly, and in the 11th round he was subjected to heavy punishment; Johnson making full use of his longer reach. Todd, however, was cheered for some good work at close range, but his injured eye by now had taken a rather serious turn. Johnson was always on top in the remaining rounds, Todd repeatedly hanging on. The referee, Eugene Corri, had no hesitation in declaring Johnson the winner. However, Corri's decision did not meet with the complete approval of spectators, which resulted in several free-fights taking place in the body of the hall. In the aftermath, Todd claimed that he did not legitimately lose his crown with the loss of the decision, though no British sportsman had supported Todd in this attitude.

==== Johnson vs Rouquet, Kid Lewis ====
On 12 October 1925, Johnson was scheduled to face Georges Rouquet at The Ring, however, the bout was cancelled due to Johnson contracting the flu, with Charlie Ring taking Johnson's place. On 8 November, Reynold's News wrote a piece stating the Rouquet's display against Ring was so impressive that may of the best judges felt that Johnson's illness may have been a fortuitous circumstance. On 9 November 1925, Johnson beat Rouquet on points, after fifteen rounds, at the Blackfriars Ring. Johnson was by far the superior boxer, and possessed physical advantages in height and reach. Rouquet endeavoured to force the close work, but was steadied by a left to the jaw in the first round, with Johnson having the better exchanges. In the eighth round, Rouquet was very aggressive, and sent frequent deliveries to the mouth, causing Johnson's lower lip to swell badly. Rouquet fought hard for a knock-out punch in the closing rounds, but Johnson was always ready to damage him severely with a left upper cut.

A year prior, on 23 February 1924, The Sportsman reported that Johnson and former middleweight world champion Ted "Kid" Lewis were originally scheduled to meet at the Belle Vue Gardens in Manchester on 3 March. On 7 October 1925, The Westminster Gazette announced that Johnson was matched with Kid Lewis for 26 November. The event was a fifteen-round contest at the 160 pound limit at King's Hall, Manchester. Boxers such as Tommy Burns, Roland Todd, and Jimmy Wilde would all be in attendance. The bout represented a contrast of styles, with the uncanny boxing skill of Johnson up against the experience and in-fighting of Kid Lewis. Opinions on the fight were mixed, although in general more pundits favoured Johnson, as some doubted Kid Lewis would break through Johnson's "rare defence". The undercard contained Phil Scott and Charlie Ring's three-round exhibition, and Albert Marchant's encounter with featherweight champion Johnny Curley.

Even at this stage of his career, Johnson still had his critics, with some doubting his capacity for withstanding heavy punishment, yet defeated Lewis with consummate ease at King's Hall, Manchester; making Lewis appear like a novice. Lewis had every opportunity, more so with referee W J Farrell allowing him to hold and wrestle, pull his man about, and hit with all the curious in-fighting punches he was accustomed to. Johnson's long-left was applied so deftly that Lewis failed badly in his attempts at in-fighting, and after the first round, Johnson was never outpointed. Lewis opened with a left to the head, followed with two blows to the body, and a short clip to the chin, of which none appeared to carry much weight. Johnson did the better in what little long-range work there was. In the second-round, Lewis dashed in, only to be met with a two-handed attack to the body. Using the ring well, Johnson piled the left with wonderful accuracy, scoring to the head, and Lewis appeared quite powerless to defend himself.

A right-hook from Lewis went astray, and Johnson took the opportunity to send his right to the jaw. Lewis missed when he jumped in with both hands at the start of the third-round. Johnson scared with a long-left, and also countered very effectively when Lewis shot his leading land to the chin. Johnson opened the fourth-round with two light-lefts to the head, and again clipped Lewis. Four times in quick succession Johnson's left reached Lewis' face, but near the end Lewis stabbed with his left and just grazed Johnson's chin with a right. Lewis tried hard in the sixth-round, but even in close-quarters he could only accomplish very little due to Johnson's great defence. At the end of the sixth-round, after the bell had sounded and Johnson had turned to his corner, Lewis jumped after him and hit him, and act which caused some uproar. In the seventh, Lewis jumped in to score on the body with both hands, and Johnson soon retaliated with a straight-left and right-cross, and near the end shook Leiws with a left-hook to the jaw. In the eighth-round, Lewis did well in a spell of in-fighting, but often received Johnson's left on his head. The fight ended in the ninth round, when Lewis complained of a damage hand and ultimately gave up the contest, with Lewis' corner throwing the towel in. The action from Lewis' seconds caused some surprised, although there was no doubt that Lewis was in a bad way, after the continuous prodding he received from Johnson's left-hand throughout the fight.

==== Johnson vs Hood I ====
On 18 November 1925, The Westminster Gazette revealed that welterweight Jack Hood had been selected by the National Sporting Club to fight Tommy Milligan for the welterweight title on 21 December, however, due to Miligan deciding to go to America, Hood was to meet Johnson at the Ring on 7 December instead. On 20 November, Birmingham Daily Gazette confirmed articles were in agreement for twenty 3-minute rounds at 154 lbs for £100 a-side and a purse of £400. On 4 December, prior to his encounter with Hood, it was revealed that Johnson would be travelling to Australia in the new year. At the official weigh-in, a day before the fight, Johnson tipped the scales at 159 lbs, while Hood weighed six pounds lighter at 152 lbs. From the inception of the match, Johnson had been pronounced the favourite for money, with odds for him at 2 to 1. On 7 December, Johnson lost the fight via close points decision, awarded by referee Joe Palmer, in favour of Hood. Although Johnson did most of the forcing in the earlier rounds, Hood countered well with both hands. In the sixth round, Hood outfought Johnson and a hard right and left hook shook Johnson, and caused damage to his left eye, which had been cut in the previous round; Hood also did most of the attacking in the eighth round. Johnson displayed sound defence, and at the half-way stage there was little to choose between the men. The twelfth was a spirited affair, with Hood getting the better of the exchanges. There was little to choose between the men in the next three rounds, but in the sixteenth, Hood put in some fine two-handed boxing, and continuing to have the best of the latter rounds.

=== Journey to Australia ===
==== The Collins fight ====
The Collins fight is considered to be a turning point in boxing history as it was the first time the British Empire championship was held by a black boxer during the period of Britain's boxing colour bar, which lasted from 1911 until 1948. On 26 September 1911, the colour bar came to provenance when the National Sporting Club imposed a "colour bar" in British boxing after, then Home Secretary, Winston Churchill, who initially remained unmoved, bowed to pressure when Randall Davidson, the Archbishop of Canterbury, and Lord Baden-Powell urged him to reconsider, and therefore declared the heavyweight encounter between Jack Johnson and Bombardier Billy Wells an illegal one at that.

On 18 January 1926, it was revealed that Johnson had arrived in Australia, under the engagement of Jack Munro, and was scheduled for five fights in Australia. He acknowledged that "[...] a coloured man can't hold the Lonsdale belt", though remarked that he was unsure of whom he had to meet, though expected to be first billed to box Harry Collins. On 4 February 1926, Birmingham Daily Gazette reported that a match was arranged to take place on 13 February at the Sydney Stadium between Johnson and Australian champion Harry Collins, in which is described as the middleweight championship of the British Empire. Birmingham Daily Gazette also revealed that Johnson has stated "down under" that he is the holder of the English title, though the British Boxing Board of Control rendered it vacant by taking it away from Roland Todd, whilst expanding "Owning to his colour, Johnson cannot fight for the English title, and his contest with Collins cannot be for the championship of the British Empire." Additionally, on 4 February, The Daily Mail also pointed out that as Johnson is ineligible for an English boxing title, the contest cannot be sanctioned for the championship of the British Empire. On 9 February, the National Sporting Club were described as being aghast at the suggestion and pointed out that although Johnson had beaten the current middleweight Lonsdale belt-holder, he cannot become English champion on account of his colour, as only full-blooded whites can hold the boxing titles in conservative England. If Collins were to have won the encounter with Johnson, he would have qualified for a meeting with the winner of the Tommy Milligan and Mickey Walker contest for the world welterweight title.

On 20 February 1926, in a twenty-round contest, Johnson brilliantly defeated Harry Collins on points to win the vacant British Empire title. The fight was witnessed by 12,000 spectators at the Sydney Stadium, however, Birmingham Daily Gazette stated that, as Johnson was not the champion of England, the bout was incorrectly described as being for the British Empire championship. At the official weigh-in, Johnson tipped the scales at 157 lbs, while Collins weighed seven pounds lighter at 150 lbs. The gate money totalled £2,472, with each man receiving £617. Johnson scored with his left with monotonous regularity, and although he had not been credited with having power behind his punches, he connected with several telling rights. Collins paid most attention to Johnson's body, but he seldom was allowed to get close enough to do any damage. In the twentieth round, Johnson sent in several powerful blows in quick succession, and had Collins in such a way that it appeared as if he could deliver a knockout blow at any moment. Collins, however, clinched on a couple of occasions, and he was in a bad way when the gong sounded, and Johnson was given the verdict by referee Joe Wallis.

==== Colour bar removed ====
The colour bar remained in force even under Johnson's win, which was deemed illegitimate by the National Sporting Club and other authorities in Britain. On 24 February 1926, Hugh D. McIntosh composed in an article for The Referee, wherein he spoke of his disdain for the British attitude in barring Johnson, to which he exclaimed "And because of that, I intend to hold championship contests for championships within the British Empire, for which I shall present special belts emblematic of the rulership of the various divisions of pugilism." He spoke of no colour or creed being barred, and maintained that such an action was prompted by what he classed as "unfair discrimination" against Johnson, who defeated Collins. He concluded by stating Johnson shall not be ruled out of his rights as a middleweight champion, thus he was going to donate some special belts for various contests; the first of these contests being Johnson v Collins. On 24 March 1926, in protest against the National Sporting Club and other authorities in Britain, McIntosh confirmed to have had belts manufactured for the British Empire Championship battles decided in any state of the Commonwealth.

After his defeat of Collins, Johnson met Tiger Jack Payne for twenty-rounds at the Sydney Stadium on 6 March, which resulted in Johnson winning via a points decision. According to The Sunday Times's editor, Solar Plexus, "Though Payne fought gamely and well from the go to stop, his well meat punches were, generally speaking, made to miss whilst Johnson's blows were crisp and clean. The decision favouring Johnson, though undoubtedly correct, did not meet with general approval."

On 12 March, it was announced that Sunny Jim Williams would be Johnson's next opponent, while Tommy Uren spoke of wishing to fight Johnson. On 16 March, in an interview with Sydney Sportsman, Williams spoke of having his heart set on beating Johnson, to which he stated "I think I can beat Johnson. I have trained for this fight as I have not trained before, and if I am beaten, the boxing public will know what I did my level best." In front of a 4,000 crowd at the Sydney Stadium, in what was referred to as the "surprise of the year", Williams defeated Johnson via a close twenty-round decision. Williams landed good blows now and again, and rapid changes from orthodox to the southpaw stance worried Johnson a good deal. A sensation was caused in the eleventh-round, when Johnson went to the canvas as a result of a heavy right swing to the jaw. Williams was encouraged, and made the pace strong, in which used both hands freely, and had Johnson on the defensive. Of his defeat to Williams, Johnson claimed he tackled the clever American too soon, after his strenuous twenty-round battles against Collins and Payne; Johnson acknowledged that he was keen on avenging the defeat.

On 27 March 1926, former Australia middleweight champion, Alf Stewart outpointed Ted Monson at West Melbourne Stadium in an eliminator to secure the position to face Johnson in his first British Empire title defence. After a satisfactory performance, Johnson successfully defended his British Empire middleweight title with a nineteenth-round knockout win. Stewart was severely handicapped by a nasty cut over the left eye, sustained in the seventh round. Up to the fourteenth round, Stewart seemed to have a chance, but in that session he went to pieces as a result of a right to the body, which was followed up by a perfect fusillade of rights to the jaw. Just as the bell went, Johnson shot out another punch to the jaw which nearly put Stewart out. Thirteen seconds before the end of the nineteenth round, Johnson dropped Stewart for the full count at the stadium.

It was announced in April that Johnson would be making a second defence of his British Empire title at the Sydney Stadium against Tommy Uren, on 8 May. At the official weigh-in, Johnson tipped the scales at 156.8 lbs, while Uren weighed seven pounds lighter at 154 lbs. There was a crowd of 10,000, and the takings for the fight were £9,587. Johnson throughout the bout displayed superlative skill, and Uren, whose in-fighting ability was well known, was not allowed much opportunity to get into close-quarters. Johnson gave him no peace, and shot a few rights to the ribs, and it was not until the eleventh-round that he landed one at Uren's solar plexus, causing him to drop to the floor in intense pain.

==== Johnson vs Payne II, Williams II, McGale ====
The following week, on 15 May, Johnson would later return to rematch Tiger Jack Payne, of whom he would he granted a twenty-round decision against at the Sydney Stadium. On 29 May, Johnson sought to avenge his loss by rematching Sunny Jim Williams at Brisbane Stadium, though lost via a very controversial points decision. Both Johnson and Williams equally weighed in at 159.6 lbs. The verdict of referee, Major Fred Craig, was met with a mixed reception, with many boxing enthusiasts believing Johnson was entitled to the decision, in which The Brisbane Courier wrote "Johnson and his father were astonished at the decision of [Craig], and there were many who thought Johnson won." Although disappointed with Major Craig's verdict, Johnson decided to remain in Brisbane for the purpose to accepting Frisco McGale's challenge. On 5 June, Johnson outpointed McGale in a match of twenty-rounds, wherein Johnson boxed with great skill and outpointed McGale in virtually every round.

=== Return from Australia ===
==== Maintaining the colour bar ====
On 12 July 1926, Johnson's recognition as middleweight champion of the British Empire was dropped when Tommy Milligan's victory over George West was officially advertised by promoters in Britain as being for the vacant British Empire title, on the basis that Johnson did not have two white parents. Thereon, after the events at Holland Park Rink, Milligan was referred to as the middleweight champion of the British Empire. By August 1926, Johnson had returned to England, after completing his successful tour of Australia. He fought and outpointed George West on 10 September, however, as the decision was not universally approved, the pair were brought back in November, to a crowd of 6,000 in Manchester, to which Johnson won by a wider margin.

On 15 November 1926, Johnson returned to London to defeat former French welterweight champion, Maurice Prunier, at The Ring via points decision. The bout was for fifteen-rounds, and Johnson was able to keep Prunier away with his long straight left, whilst he sent in the right from time to time, and generally had the best of it. Prunier was always trying to make a fight of it, and in the twelfth round his stock went up considerably. In this he was very aggressive, and laid Johnson's eye open with a left-hook which had a lot of power in it. Johnson was smart enough to keep him at a distance for the balance of the bout, and easily won on points by referee Jim Kenrick's verdict.

The following month, on 6 December, Johnson was disqualified in the fifth round for hitting Jack Etienne low with the left hand, though he was cautioned in a previous round for a similar offence by referee Jim Kenrick.

==== Johnson v Harvey I ====
After the Etienne disqualification, Johnson set his sights on Len Harvey, and in front of a crowd of 4,000 at The Ring, Johnson went the full twenty-rounds and defeated Harvey via a points decision. At the weigh in, Johnson weighed in at 160 pounds (72.6 kg), while Harvey came in lighter at 156.5 pounds (71 kg). Both boxers had their respective fathers as seconds. Johnson's victory was beyond dispute, for he was much superior than Harvey, who hardly won a solitary round, and was nearly always out-scored. Harvey had a shade the better of the early rounds, more so the first and sixth, though Johnson appeared to be hitting the harder of the two, which was rather surprising as Johnson had failed to show that he had possessed a really good punch in the majority of his previous contests. From the seventh, Johnson began to wear Harvey down with good two-handed punches both to the body and the face. Harvey was never idle, and continually got home home straight and accurate lefts, but his right was not so much evident as usual. The punishment Harvey took sapped his strength and his face bore evidence of the hard punching Johnson. Johnson was practically unmarked at the close of the contest when referee Sam Russell announced the victor. He was the clear winner on points, and exposed Harvey's offensive and defensive weaknesses. After the fight, many felt Johnson had substantiated his claim to a meeting with Tommy Milligan.

During the post-fight interviews, promoter A.W. Shuker confirmed that Johnson would face George West in Cardiff on 31 January. Johnson would later defeat West for the third time via fifteen-round point decision, before knocking out Horace Jackson in the fourth-round at Drill Hall, Middlesbrough on 17 May. After his victory over Jackson, Johnson travelled to Milan, Italy to face Leone Jacovacci at Velodromo Sempione, however, he lost a twelve-round points decision. Jacovacci had won with ease, flooring Johnson three times before winning on points. After the fight, Johnson revealed that the match was taken at short notice, and that he never allowed himself to settle down after his long journey to Italy.

In May 1927, it was announced that Johnson and Ted Moore had signed articles to fight a fifteen-round middleweight contest at Olympia London, on 9 June, for a purse and side stakes amounting to £1,500. The top of the bill was shared with Pancho Dencio and Francois Moracchini. Johnson defeated Ted Moore via a points decision, on 9 June. Moore tried hard to win by knockout early on and ultimiately failed. In the second-round, Moore's left ear was badly damaged and the doctor advised that the fight he stopped, although referee Norman Clarke disregarded his advice.

Johnson returned to the ring on 25 July at The Ring in London against ex-amateur champion Jack Elliott. At the weigh-in, Elliot's weight was 162 lbs, whereas one and one-quarter lbs less. The whole fight consisted of rushes by Elliot, with Johnson countering with fine skill. Twice in round-eight, Elliot had to be warned for head-butting. Elliot made a big effort in the twelfth round, only to fare badly. Elliot did his best, but did not win a single round. The punishment from Joshua would have put most men down, and due to winning: Johnson was expected to be matched with British, Commonwealth and European middleweight champion Tommy Milligan.

Following his defeat of Elliot, Johnson had been touring music-halls and giving boxing exhibitions. On 19 December, Johnson avenged his loss, a loss via disqualification, by defeating Jack Etienne by way of a fifteen-round points decision at The Ring.

Johnson returned to the ring on 1 January 1928, to defeat Piet Brand, the middleweight champion of Holland, in a fifteen-round contest at the Ring, wherein Brand retired in the tenth-round.

=== Move to light-heavyweight ===
==== Johnson v Daniels ====
On 23 January 1928, fought former British light-heavyweight champion Gipsy Daniels at The Ring, the latter of which had recently lost to Max Schmeling in Germany. The fight would be Johnson's at the light-heavyweight limit. At the weigh-in, Johnson weighed it at only 156 lbs for his match with Daniels, who was three-quarters of a pound inside the stipulated 179 lbs limit. Daniels' title was not at stake, as the weight stipulated was 1 lbs above the light-heavyweight limit. The big difference in weight notwithstanding, Johnson gave Daniels a lesson in boxing and ringcraft, and did everything to him except knock him out. He may have knocked Daniels out if he had let himself out to the full at any time during the last five rounds. As it was, Johnson defeated Daniels by a convincing margin of points. It was soon seen that Daniels was bent on mischief, but all he did was to make people laugh when he missed by "miles" with huge left and ring swings. After this, Johnson's punching powder improved wonderfully, and he punished Daniels with terrific right upper-cuts and swing punches to the bdy and short arm blows to Daniels' jaw. At the result of the fight, there was joy in Bill Johnson's camp, as the victory of son's was of great importance in England and therefore meant that he would be in greater demand and may eventually go to America. Following Johnson's win, he challenged British light-heavyweight champion Frank Moody, and a £1,000 purse had been offered.

==== Johnson v Hood II ====
On 10 February, Leeds Mercury revealed that olympic welterweight champion Jean Delarge was to have met Johnson, though due to being cut out of affair on 8 February, was substituted by Hood because "a certain highly place personage" had expressed a wish to see both Hood and Johnson together. On 28 February, it was announced that Johnson would face Hood on 13 February at catchweight, in a rematch of their 1925 bout which resulted in a loss for Johnson. Johnson lost the fight via fifteen-round points decision. Vast crowds awaited the arrival of the Prince of Wales, as it was his first visit to the Blackfriars Ring, who specially attended to see Johnson fight. Twice the crowds broke through the police cordon, but opened a way for the Prince when he stepped out from his car. The hall was packed, and the audience sang For He's a Jolly Good Fellow, with the crowd outside joining in. After this the Prince chatted with Jimmy Wilde during the preliminary bouts. On taking the ring, it was seen that Johnson was the heavier of the men, though there was little in it regarding their respective heights. Hood was the first to enter the right, and it was noticed that he had a swelling on the left-side of his forehead. It was noticed that Hood fully clothed, and Johnson stripped, were both inside the 175 pound limit, with the actual weights not being taken.

After two rounds of sparring, in which neither landed a telling blow, Hood got in several lefts to Johnson's face. In the second, Johnson was warned for a low hit. The third-round was fought cleverly, both relying chiefly on the left hand, while in the next Hood scored the majority of the points, though Johnson levelled up in the fifth-round with a hard left to the jaw doing Hood no good. Johnson led off in the sixth-round with left and rights to the head, and later received a hard left to the jaw. Both missed well-intentioned aims in the next round, and then Hood landed a heavy left to the mouth. In the eighth round, Hood brought his right-hand into the picture, and smashed it into Johnson's face, and followed up with a fine left. Johnson's swinging punches brought him success, but he had difficulty in evading Hood's lead. Near the end of the ninth round, Hood received a hard right to the jaw from Johnson. Johnson became erratic in the eleventh-round, but he was able to score with his left. Johnson forced the pace in the thirteenth and fourteenth rounds. Late in the fourteenth, Hood connected with a left to the jaw. Johnson fought to the last gong, but Hood was always ready with his left hand, and in the fifteenth round he surprised Johnson with a right which shook Johnson. The referee, Sam Russell, awarded Hood with the victory on points.

The fight was regarded as one of the best exhibitions of scientific boxing seen in Britain for years. Overall the fight between Hood and Johnson was one in which Hood boxed the battle of his career; his left-hand leads delighted the crowd. Johnson, who was two stones heavier, also gave a characteristic display of defensive work, whilst it being one of his more aggressive performances.

=== Comeback ===
Prior to the Hood rematch, Johnson had signed to meet Frank Fowler at Leeds on 1 March, over fifteen-rounds. The contest was part of a large tournament at Leeds Town Hall, on behalf of the local Jewish hospital. Johnson avenged his loss and defeated Fowler at Leeds Town Hall, with the referee stopping the fight in the ninth round. Fowler was being badly punished in the ninth-round, but held on very gamely, although his right eye was cut. Fowler was bleeding and obviously puzzled by the defence and speed of his opponent. Johnson played for the head wit half-arm jabs and was practically unmarked when the contest was stopped. He then had two more fights in the space of the given month, defeating George Hetherington by stoppage and Ted Moore on points; which was followed by a fifth-round stoppage of George Schladenhaufen on 23 October.

==== Johnson v Jacovacci II, Ara, Williams III ====
On 1 November 1928, it was confirmed that European middleweight champion Leone Jacovacci would face Johnson, and that the contest would take place in Manchester on 20 November. Jacovacci was the most feared middleweight in Europe at the time and the contest was claimed to be for the middleweight championship of Europe, which was held by Alexander Ireland, however, the International Boxing Union thought otherwise. The confidence of Georges Carpentier was that Jacovacci was capable of winning decisively under six-rounds. Johnson went the full fifteen-rounds, in front of 7,000 spectators in Manchester, and defeated Jacovacci via a points decision awarded by referee Joe Bowker. The crowd was the largest Manchester had ever seen at a tournament. In the early rounds of the contest, Jacovacci boxed at a hurricane rate, showering blows from all angles. He forced the battle, but Johnson's calm skill made him miss many times. Jacovacci took a tremendous lot out of himself, but he was unable to land a telling blow, although in the fourth-round he cut open Johnson's left eyebrow. This however, acted as a tonic on Johnson, and he became far more aggressive, applying to the body as well as to the head. The sustained efforts of Jacovacci tired him, and then it was then when Johnson came into his own. He boxed calmly and with deliberation, carefully scoring at every conceivable opportunity. After the bout, the question of the status of Jacovacci European title came into question, with regards to the I.B.U.

On 20 December 1928, Johnson and Ignacio Ara, the middleweight champion of Spain, had signed articles to fight a fifteen-round middleweight contest at The Ring for 31 December. The contest was set at 160 lbs for £100 a-side. Johnson won comfortably via points decision. Johnson dominated the fight with his left-had, and though Ara was badly punished, he was always dangerous and even towards the close of the fight, when his left eye was completely closed. At times, Ara used his right-hand effectively, and more than once steadied Johnson with a punch from said hand.

On 22 January 1929, Johnson avenged his two losses by outclassing and outpointing Sunny Jim Williams at King's Hall, Manchester. The bout was billed as an eliminator for the world middleweight title. The contest was one of fifteen three-minute rounds at 160 lbs, which included side-stakes of £2,500. Williams had already beat Johnson twice in Australia, though Johnson was confident of being able to win at the third time of asking. Johnson, albeit having the half-pound weight advantage, had little difficulty in evading Williams' rushes within the early rounds. Williams swung his blows wildly, but generally, Johnson in straight-lefts to the face. Williams was more successful in the eighth round, in which his left swings found the body, and there were times when Johnson was fighting on the defensive. Johnson, however, scored freely to the face in the twelfth round, but he was shaken by some hard rights to the body in the fourteenth, which was Williams' best round. After the fight, Johnson showed little signs of damage against Williams, while a challenge was sent to the New York State Athletic Commission for a world middleweight championship bout against Micky Walker. Johnson stated that he had received a good offer to fight in America, though won't consider it after his next fight. Additionally, Williams spoke of wanting a fourth fight with Johnson.

=== Return to light-heavyweight ===
==== Champion of the North of England ====
On 22 March 1929, The Leeds Mercury reported that Johnson's next engagement would be with Belgian light-heavyweight Gerard Debarbieux at Liverpool on 1 April, while the newspaper noted that Johnson could be a likely opponent for Harry Crossley. On 6 May, the match arranged for 3 June in Leeds, between Johnson and Crossley, meant that the Northern light-heavyweight title was at stake, with the contract specifying for the men weighing in at 175 pounds. At the weigh in, Debarbieux weighed in at 175 pounds (79.4 kg), while Johnson came in lighter at 168 pounds (76.2 kg). Johnson won the fight with a fusillade of left-hands which continually troubled Debarbieux, who retired in the ninth-round with a damaged hand. In his preparation for Crossley, Johnson had gone to Upwell, near Wisbech, to do his training, as he realised the importance of the fight and that Crossley was a formidable rival, while there were rumours that Fred Shaw would be Johnson's chief sparring partner.

Both Johnson and Crossley at the weigh-in were within the 175 pound limit. Both men were measuring each other in the opening rounds, in which Johnson got the better of with left digs to the body, whilst Crossley landed two blows to the head. In the next two rounds there was some smart feinting and footwork on the part of Johnson, but this did not prevent Crossley from getting in several right-hooks to the head. Johnson then proceeded to attack Crossley's body, but like Crossley, he occasionally delivered a straight left to the face. Crossley was very forceful at the next meeting and shook Johnson with powerful double-handed blows to the head and body, to which Johnson recovered, however, and before the round was over he landed a splendidly-timed straight-left to Crossley's face. The fifth-round was even, both men being short with their leads, while Crossley was rather wild with his attempts to get home a right upper-cut. Hard hitting took place in the next round, in which Johnson's right eye was swollen and Crossley's left eye was cut. Up to that point, Johnson had displayed the better boxing abilities, but his opponent fought gamely in the middle rounds, after which Johnson led well on points. He continued to do so until the end, and his smarter footwork enabled him to worry Crossley round the ring. Crossley landed two right upper-cuts in the eleventh and twelfth rounds. Johnson proceeded to play on Crossley's damaged eye, but the latter took his punishment well. Johnson went the full fifteen rounds at Fenton Street Drill Hall, Leeds, defeating Crossley via a points decision whilst winning the inaugural Northern Area light-heavyweight title.

A few weeks later, on 21 June, at the open-air boxing tournament of Clapton Stadium, Johnson defeated Marcel Moret of France in the fourth-round, with the referee intervening. Johnson scored a very easy win, in which he fought coolly and quickly, obtaining the measure of his opponent, dealt out much punishment with both hands. Morat's face was badly bleeding when in the fourth-round the referee stopped the bout and declared Johnson the winner via points decision. Many spectators at Clapton Stadium had cried out to the referee to stop the fight prior to the stoppage.

After defeating Moret, Johnson vacated the Northern Area light-heavyweight title, which was later contested by Harry Crossley and Frank Fowler on 29 June at National Sporting Club in Leeds.

==== Johnson v Bonaglia ====
After vacating his title, Johnson then had three fights in the space of one month, defeating Emile Egrel and Lode Wuestenraedt by way of stoppage, and Pierre Gandon by a points decision. On 26 November, after defeating Gandon, it was announced that Johnson had been matched with Michele Bonaglia of Italy (38–1–1), the European light-heavyweight champion, who had only lost to future heavyweight champion Max Schmeling. Johnson gained a points victory over Bonaglia in a fifteen-round contest at King's Hall, Manchester, winning the majority of the rounds by a comfortable margin on 17 December. Johnson opened in confident fashion, getting over one right which upset the Italian, but Bonaglia was up immediately. Giving a masterly display of boxing both in attack and defence, Johnson won the first seven rounds in fairly easy fashion, but at times he treated Bonaglia cheaply, and paid forfeit for this failing in the eighth round. Bonaglia dropped Johnson with a right to the side of the head, but Johnson was not down long enough to take the count, although he was obviously upset by the experience. The following round went to the Italian, though Johnsom, from this point, boxed skillfully and gained a very easy points victory.

By the end of 1929, supporters of Johnson had failed in another attempt to persuade the Home Office to remove the colour bar in British boxing championship regulations.

==== Johnson v Jacovacci III ====
On 9 April 1930, Jimmy Johnston, who acted as Phil Scott's American manager when the boxer was in the United States, informed a Reuters' correspondent that Johnson was on his way to the U.S., with Johnston stating that he was arranging a number of matches for the light-heavyweight boxer. Johnson returned to the ring on 12 June 1930 to face Bob Carvill, with whom he beat via a wide points decision at Liverpool Stadium. The fight was Johnson's first bout since his return from America in May, which was a fruitless errand for Johnson as his colour was raised as an objection, therefore was not given a chance.

On 17 June 1930, he returned to face current European and Italian middle-weight champion Leone Jacovacci at St James Hall, Newcastle. Johnson defeated Jacovacci via referee technical decision, which was later revealed to be due to Jacovacci's injured hand. In the seventh-round, a short jolt to the body sent Jacovacci to the canvas for a count of nine. At the end of the round, Jacovacci went to his corner, where he received the usual attention, but when the bell went for the eighth-round he refused to leave his chair. He was cautioned by the referee, who immedtiately commenced to count him out. Jacovacci then rose from his chair and held out his hand to Johnson in token of defeat. Prior to the stoppage, Johnson had outboxed Jacovacci in every department.

==== Retirement and frustration ====
After his second defeat of Jacovacci, in June, it was revealed that promoter Johnny Best was attempting to match Johnson with Jack Etienne, who was one of the best light-heavyweights in Europe. Johnson had already been defeated by Etienne, though he later avenge such a loss; with a third fight arousing considerable interest.

On 24 August, it was announced that Johnson, who was due to meet future Italian heavyweight champion Merlo Prescio on 8 September at The Ring, had asked for his contract to be cancelled. Johnson declared that he is retiring due to the colour bar preventing him obtaining a championship fight, while he is barred from the Royal Albert Hall and the National Sporting Club. During the announcement, Johnson stated "I have been trying for years to get championship fights, but I always find it impossible, because of the prejudice in some sporting circles against men of colour. I don't blame the general sporting public. Followers of boxing want to see me fight." He added "I issue a challenge to any of the well-known fighters - Scott, Harvey, Hood and the rest - for a fight. Winner take all, but I know that they will not take it up." Additionally, Hugh Lowther, 5th Earl of Lonsdale was interviewed and stated while he had the greatest admiration for Johnson, both as a fighter and as a man, the colour question debarred him from fighting for a Lonsdale Belt. The Ring management have refused to release Johnson from his contract to meet Prescio, though had offered a gold belt for a fight between him and any other light-heavyweight on Johnson's terms. According to a Daily Express representative, Johnson had not received contact from the Ring management. Their offer, he said, would make no different to his decision to retire in which he explained "I signed no contract to appear on September 8. My father signed it for me, and they cannot force me to fight. I shall not turn up unless the British Boxing Board of Control will guarantee me a fight for the cruiserweight championship." He also stated that he intends to carry on a bookmaking business, whilst stating "My aim was to become a world's champion, but I am coloured, and that seems to be against me." Of Johnson's claims, Victor Berliner, head of the Ring Syndicate, stated that Johnson had repudiated his contract and remarked that "We deserve the right to take what action we like in the matter [...] If boxers are allowed to break definite contracts, which involve promoters in heavy loss and their supporters in disappointment, the name might as well be thrown up." By September, the Ring Syndicate maintained that Johnson was still under contract.

=== Comeback ===
In September 1930, Tommy Richie, boxing promoter, attempted to secure a match with Johnson and Harry Crossley for a gold belt, purse and the light-heavyweight championship of Britain. Lancashire Evening Post stated that "If [Richie] succeeds it will be one of the most important fights of the year in the North", though highlighted the apparent difficulty in obtaining Johnson's signature. On 1 September, Richie sent a telegram to William Johnson, Len's father and manager, inviting Len to fight Crossley in Preston, though the reply was met with the fact Johnson shall not be entering into any more boxing contracts. In October 1930, negotiations were confirmed in progress for a fight between Johnson and American Dave Shade at Manchester, with Johnson recently altering his decision to retire, and being eagar to face Shade.

On 13 October, Johnson defeated Pierre Gandon, of France, via a narrow fifteen-round points decision at The Ring. Johnson seemed very eagar to set the pace when the fight began. His footwork was exceedingly light and quick, and his left-hand flushed into Gandon's face with fine accuracy. The Frenchman was slow by comparison, not only on his feet but also with his hands. But when he did land there was power in the punch. Johnson was twice compelled to cover up after receiving powerful rights to the body, and during the third round he came off badly from a collision of heads, receiving a cut high up over the temple. As the fight progressed, it became evident that if Gandon was to win it would only be from a single punch. With a battered face, and sometimes bewildered mind, he fought an uphill battle with fine determination. Johnson switched his attack to the body, while Gandon aimed his blows to the head. In an exchange of blows, Gandon connected with a good-right that toppled Johnson to the canvas. The crowd went wild, and Gandon was on his toes eager to set loose. Johnson rose immediately, and boxing warily, stalled until the bell, although he napped another stiff punch from his opponent. Johnson was shaken by a right-swing to the jaw in the eleventh round, though the Frenchman was unable to press the advantage home. Johnson's left eye was now half-closed and appeared to be bothering him, but he boxed cleverly to the end of round-fourteen and the final round.

On 21 October 1930, he returned to face Giuseppe Malerba at Free Trade Hall, Manchester, where he defeated Malerba via referee technical decision in the seventh-round. Inches short in reach than Johnson, Malerba simply couldn't get inside that left-hand. He tried all he knew but Johnson's left-hand was like a ramrod, as it kept flicking the Italian's nose and straightened him out.

==== Johnson v Crossley II ====
On 11 October, it was reported that negotiations were still proceeding for a match at catchweight between Johnson and Crossley, providing sanction is not obtained from the British Boxing Board of Control for a match for the light-heavyweight title. On 29 October, both parties had come to terms for a meeting on 18 November, at Manchester. The fight was confirmed not to be at catchweight, and the colour ban still remained, therefore the match wasn't for Crossley's British light-heavyweight championship. At the weigh-in, Johnson was well inside the stipulated weight of 177 pounds (80 kg), while Crossley scaled at 174 pounds (79 kg).

In front of a large crowd at the Free Trade Hall on 17 November, Johnson and Crossley fought a 15-round split decision draw, in which a great amount felt that Johnson had won the fight. Johnson surprised the crowd in a number of rounds by throwing defence to the winds and going all out for a knock-out, particularly in the seventh and fifteenth rounds. He carried the fight from Crossley from the second-round onwards. His long left kept finding its way into Crossley's face. The champion took most of his points for his work at close-quarters, but a great many of the blows landed on Johnson's arms and gloves, whose defence was splendid throughout. Johnson had to hold occasionally due to the heavy blows to the body by Crossley, and was cautioned; Crossley at one point had Johnson weakened, though he neglected to follow up. In the third-round, Johnson opened a wound on Crossley's left eye, and Johnson started to force matters from the fifth-round onwards, and scored heavily. In the seventh-round, Johnson nearly finished the fight when he sent the champion down with three hard-rights to the jaw, but the bell came to the aid of Crossley. Crossley improved in the eighth and ninth rounds, scoring with two-handed punches to Johnson's body, but did not do any material damage. Johnson had the far better closing rounds, being busy all the time with his left. Crossley adopted the policy of going for Johnson's body all the way through. Many of the right arm punches at the ribs were taken on Johnson's left arm and Crossley, ignoring the fact that they weren't point-scoring, continued to punch at that arm. The result was that well before the end of the fight, Johnson's left was no longer of use as a weapon of offence.

The decision of referee, P.J. Morris, was received with mixed reception. In the post-fight interview, Crossley spoke of being satisfied with the verdict, and praised Johnson's boxing, in which he continued by stating: "[...] Johnson is a very good man. He takes a lot of hitting with that stance of his, and he is very clever on his feet. I was confident enough, but somehow I had a hunch that it would be a draw. He scored a lot with his lefts, but they were only light flips, and I do not think people saw how many I was getting in under his left arm." After the fight, Johnson attended the Manchester Royal Infirmary, as his damaged left-arm was placed under X-rays; it was noted the injury occurred prior to the fight, while causing him considerable pain against Crossley.

==== Johnson v N.S.C., Etienne III & IV ====
On 2 January 1931, The Leicester Evening Mail exclusively announced that Larry Gains had a scheduled meeting with Sam Russell of the National Sporting Club, with a view of removing the colour bar in British boxing, to which Gains stated, "[...] It will mean that Johnson will be able to fight Harry Crossley for the Londsale cruiserweight belt [...] You can guess what the lifting of the ban would mean to me." As of 5 February, the National Sporting Club had scrapped the rule prohibiting coloured boxers on their programmes, and it was hoped that some amends would be made to Johnson. On 25 February, The Western Morning News announced that Johnson had signed up for three matches in Manchester, with the Belle Vue Syndicate proposing to match him with Harry Crossley and Len Harvey, light-heavyweight and middleweight champions, respectively. On 27 March, Northampton Chronicle & Echo reported that Johnson would appear at King's Hall, Manchester on 6 April, in a match at light-heavyweight against Jack Etienne, who was regarded as one of the best light-heavyweights in Europe. Leading up to the fight, Johnson was the major betting-line favourite, though on 6 April, Etienne narrowly outpointed him over fifteen-rounds at King's Hall, Manchester. Johnson was particularly keen to win the rubber-match with Etienne in view of the possibilities of a rematch with Len Harvey. Johnson started off well, and in the earlier rounds had a slight lead, but Etienne was always the stronger of the two. The Belgian fighter launched a fierce two-handed attack from the start and found frequent loopholes in Johnson's defence. During the post-fight interviews, Bill Johnson, father and manager of Len, remarked that his son had won the fight, in which he expanded: "[...] the referee thought otherwise. That is all there is to that. The boys meet again on Monday next, and if Etienne's party think that the Belgian can confirm what the referee thought: I have £100 ready to place on the table to say he can't [...]" The rematch was set for two-weeks later on 21 April, for £50 a-side.

On 21 April, Johnson avenged his recent loss by defeating Etienne via points-decision over fifteen-rounds at King's Hall, Manchester. In the fourth meeting of Johnson and Etienne, with a crowd of 5,000, both boxed cautiously at the start, but afterwards indulged in some clever left leading, while Etienne was particularly smart at in-fighting. Johnson was the aggressor in practically every round and gave a fine exhibition of ringcraft, and Etienne countered accurately and compelled his opponent to make some bad misses. Etienne was very worrying to Johnson in the closing rounds, when he sent in some powerful lefts and rights to the body, and at close he had a great reception.

After defeating Etienne, Johnson sent out a challenge to the heavyweight division by announcing his interest in competing within the division, to which he openly challenged British heavyweight champion Reggie Meen and Larry Gains. Since his second defeat of Etienne, Johnson hasn't fought except in his own boxing booth, but of moving up in weight he stated "I mean to meet as many good [light-heavyweights] and heavy-weights as I can. I think Mr. Broadribb can get me the fights. In the middleweight class I could find no fights with any money in them, so I am going after the big fellows."

==== Royal Albert Hall's colour bar ====
As with the Collins fight of 1926, Johnson's fight with Adolf Pott is considered a turning point in boxing history because Johnson was the first black fighter who fought at the Royal Albert Hall. On 13 January 1932, it was reported that Johnson would return to middleweight and be matched with Marcel Thil, the middleweight champion of France, on 25 January at the Palais des Sports, Paris, however, it was later revealed that Johnson would appear on the undercard of Larry Gains' defense of his British Empire heavyweight title against Don McCorkindale at the Royal Albert Hall, London. By 23 January, the action of the British Boxing Board of Control in lifting the colour bar had given Larry Gains the opportunity to win the British Empire heavyweight title, as well as Johnson to win the Lonsdale belt. It was remarked that members of the British Boxing Board of Control consulted with prominent individuals at the Home Office, and the natural inference being that the authorities are no longer antagonistic to black and white title fights. Of the decision, manager Ted Broadribb stated that "British boxing in the future will have a much better chance in so far as the world's championships are concerned. In such men as [Gains] and [Johnson] we have boxers who, as British champions, could be sent to fight the world's best. Hitherto, they had been victims of an unfair regulation."

It was arranged that German heavyweight, Egon Stief, would be Johnson's opponent, despite Johnson being 28 pounds lighter, and on 27 January, one day before the fight, it was announced that Adolf Pott, of Cologne, would substitute the position of Stief, who was unable to appear at Royal Albert Hall. At the weigh-in, Johnson came in at the weight of 176 pounds (80 kg), one of his heaviest, while, by contrast, heavyweight Pott scaled in at 186 pounds (84 kg). The bout was cut from ten-rounds to eight-rounds in view of the increase in the number of rounds in the Gains v McCorkindale fight from twelve to fifteen-rounds. On 28 January 1932, in an eight-round contest, Johnson outclassed Pott to secure a points-decision at Royal Albert Hall. Johnson never wasted his punches, and he picked out his blows to drive Pott around the ring, though Pott fought strongly at the end. At the same time it was skill against brawn. In the opening round, Johnson's skilful boxing dominated, for Pott was too slow and clumsy. Towering above his opponent, Pott couldn't connect with his opponent, though Johnson punished him with right-hand punches to the body. For four-rounds, Pott's swinging punches were countered and he began to use his weight and hang on, though Johnson made him pay for it with punishing rights to the body. Pott was bleeding from an injured right-eye in the fifth-round, and Johnson, who was both confident and calm, had the measure of his man, with referee C.B. Thomas awarding Johnson an eight-rounds points decision.

By 6 February, the Board of Control in regard to the Gains and McCorkindale encounter by waving the objection of years to black and white title contests, in which they altered the rule governing such bouts to read "British" instead of "born in the British Isles", which made it possible for anyone in the Empire, whether black or white, to win home titles. The ruling had given rise to animated discussion and divergent views. Additionally, the British Boxing Board of Control still adhered to Regulation 31, which confines such contests to legally British subjects, "born of white parents", which quelled any thoughts of Johnson and Harvey fighting the Lonsdale belt. Johnson then had two more fights in March, defeating both Steve McCall and Lode Wuestenraedt via knockout within four-rounds.

==== Johnson v Harvey II ====
On 27 April, Johnson returned to the Royal Albert Hall to face former French light-heavyweight champion Arthur Vermaut, who was knocked out in half-a-minute into round-one with a perfectly timed left to the body from Johnson. Johnson disregarded the Frenchman's left, and when they went into clinches Johnson hit heavily with both hands. After half a minute of fighting, Johnson, in a breakaway, got in a left and a right and then another left to the side of the body. Vermaut went down in agony, to be counted out. After knocking out Vermaut, on 27 April, it was announced that Johnson would rematch Len Harvey in a fifteen-round contest at the Royal Albert Hall on 11 May. Additionally, it was also revealed to be taking place under strict championship conditions at the middleweight poundage, and that the contest would be a championship affair, albeit won't be sanctioned by the British Boxing Board of Control, which does not allow coloured boxers to box for British titles. Harvey had campaigned against the colour bar which had prevented black boxers competing for titles, in which he insisted on fighting Johnson and then Larry Gains.

On 4 May, Jeff Dickson, promoter of the Royal Albert Hall, was said to be ignoring the British Boxing Board of Control by announcing the contest between Johnson and Harvey as an "unofficial championship". The referee for the bout would be known at the weigh-in, with the names of C.B. Thomas, Jack Bloomfield and Jim Kenrick being put into a hat with the first name drawn being the person who'd officiate, which resulted in C.B. Thomas' selection on 11 May. At the weigh-in, Johnson, 29 at the time of the fight, was inside the stipulated weight limit of 161 pounds; as did Harvey, 24, who was also within the limit. After the weigh-in, Johnson spoke of his confidence "I have never had such a fine preparation in my life, and I shall do even better than the last time [...] I shall stop him".

On 11 May, in a fifteen-round contest, Johnson narrowly lost to Harvey via a points-decision for the British middleweight title. The Nottingham Journal stated Johnson was a better stylist and that the rounds were extremely close, with Harvey taking nine of the fifteen rounds "always by a mere shade". It was the opinion of the newspaper that Johnson had difficulty in doing the weight - coming down from light-heavyweight, thus was quite unsure of his strength. He resorted to body blows in his attempt to weaken Harvey, and during the final round he had Harvey clinging on desperately to escape the danger of a knockout. After a short spar, Harvey tried a left swing to the face, but Johnson evaded the blow, with both men clinching. On the break Harvey caught Johnson with a left-hook under the ear and followed with a right to the head. He attempted this again but Johnson was quick to escape while landing a right to the body, in which Harvey followed with a right-swing to the head. In the second-round, Harvey was the first to score with a left, but Johnson was evading; Harvey found it difficult to penetrate Johnson's guard, though Harvey attacked with a left which resulted in Johnson countering to the head and body, and then connected a fine left to Harvey's chin. In the third-round, Harvey's right-eye showed a slight abrasion. Johnson stopped Harvey's rush and took the initiative, but Harvey's defence was accurate and Johnson had difficulty in scoring. There was too much in-fighting and Harvey missed with a right-swing as the round ended.

Harvey, in the fourth-round, scored with two beautifully-timed lefts flush to Johnson's face and then steered clear of a vicious uppercut from Johnson. Johnson then scored with a hard-left under the heart which caused Harvey to stand still momentarily. He was fighting hard immediately afterwards, but Johnson took the upper hand and got in several well-timed lefts to the face and rights to the body. In the fifth-round, both men rushed to the centre of the ring and fell into a clinch, and it appeared a difficult matter for C.B. Thomas to separate them. Harvey was relying on his left, while Johnson was concentrating upon a short right-arm jolt under the heart, and with this blow he scored several times with terrific force. And then in the sixth, Harvey was the first to score, and he used his left to perfection, but many attempts to bring the right across to Johnson's jaw were futile. Johnson met his advances with left-uppercuts and blows to the body. Following the sixth, both led simultaneously with lefts and both received a punch to the face. Johnson was boxing in good form, but Harvey landed a hard right which landed at the back of the neck. Johnson drove one punch to the stomach that almost brought Harvey to his knees. Johnson came back with straight lefts; Harvey, in going backwards to his attack, slipped down and Johnson gallantly stepped forward and assisted Harvey to his feet. Johnson got home with three hard left-hooks to the head.

Following the seventh-round, Harvey started with several lefts under Johnson's ear and followed up with a tremendous right to the jaw. Johnson didn't appear any the worse, and was after Harvey with heavy body-blows. Harvey compelled him to break away with a fine uppercut; Johnson then forced Harvey into a corner and scored with several double-handed blows to the head. In the ninth, Harvey started mixing it, and after a left to the body, he brought the right across to Johnson's jaw, under which Johnson squired and got into close-quarters. Harvey pushed his man away, and after scoring several rights he steadied Johnson with cleverly delivered lefts. Harvey at this stage was having the better of the exchanges. In round-ten, Harvey had had distinctly the better of the fight: he was confident and immediately set to work to outbox Johnson, who did not appear to cope effectively with Harvey's two-handed punches. At the beginning of the eleventh, Harvey rushed out of his corner, and before Johnson had realised what had happened Harvey had made points with straight-lefts to the face and a right to the body. Harvey's left was seldom out of Johnson's face, and Johnson attempted to close-in but Harvey kept him away.

As the twelfth round began, Johnson had shown less of his ability which had brought him great renown. He appeared slow and his blows lacked power, whereas Harvey had little difficulty in getting away from him. In round-thirteen, Johnson came out smartly out of his corner and made an attempt to take the initiative, but Harvey outpointed him by use of the left, though his leads began to miss. Johnson made a great effort, and for a time he looked better, until Harvey eventually forced the pace.

In the penultimate round, both men were in-fighting, but after they were parted by referee Thomas, Harvey led with a left to the face and then a left to the body. Johnson then countered with both hands to the face, but his blows lacked power, and it seemed that his getting down to the middleweight limit had cost him much speed and punching power. The last round saw both men fighting viciously, wherein Johnson was the better of the two, but his blows met with some good counters. Johnson concentrated on the body and scored with great effect. Once, after a delivery, Thomas spoke to Johnson about the lowness of the punch. He kept up his body attack, but could not get home an effective blow, whilst Harvey was scoring with round-arm blows about the head. Harvey was palpably in trouble, and two body blows caused him to grunt and wince. He clung desperately, and just escaped the danger of a knockout in the final moments of the round, before Thomas awarded Harvey the decision. After the fight, Johnson wasn't quite so elated by C.B. Thomas' decision: "I certainly thought I did enough to win. It seemed to me I had scored just as many points as Harvey. I agree it was a fine fight, and there might not have been much in it, but it's my opinion that I won." Additionally, Johnson hinted at a third fight, whilst praising Harvey, in which he stated, "I shall try again. I have beaten Harvey once ad I can do it again, I'm sure. But it was a great scrap, and Harvey is a fine fellow."

=== Later career ===
==== Johnson v Thil ====
After the Harvey rematch, Johnson was touring County Durham with his boxing booth, and during this period The Belfast Telegraph reported that Johnson, who for some years has been experiencing eyesight trouble, was likely to give up active participation in boxing. It was revealed that he had to decline a number of fights, to which the newspaper added "Len has been fighting resolutely against an increasing disability, but a commonsense view of the danger he runs, should he ignore skilled advice, may lead him to a retirement decision". His father, William, of the predicament remarked "It is a terrible disappointment, but the blessing of sight is, after all, greater than the blessing of a boxing trophy." Johnson's eyesight issues began in 1926, during his visit to Australia, where he was advised to wear glasses for reading and writing. Additionally, since then, Johnson was involved as an acting second to his protégée, bantamweight Andy Byrne, and olympian Don McCorkindale.

On 24 September, it was announced that Johnson would make a return to middleweight and be matched with Marcel Thil, the middleweight champion of France, on 3 October, at the opening of the winter season at the Palais des Sports, Paris, though due to Thil spraining his ankle, the fight was postponed to 31 October. In the interim of training for the Thil fight, future British heavyweight champion Jack London had accepted Johnson's offer to fight him. In preparation for Thil, Johnson was sparring Jim Stanley and Valenzo Pinca. At the weigh-in, Johnson scaled in at 163 and a half-pounds, whereas Thil came in lighter at 161 and a half-pounds. On 31 October, in front of a crowd of 25,000 at the Palais des Sports, Johnson was defeated by Thil via a referee-technical decision. After seven fierce rounds, Johnson was forced to give up. The gong sounded for the eighth-round, but Johnson rose from his corner and said that he was unable to continue. Of the seven rounds fought, Thil won five, and the other two were even rounds. After his defeat to Thil, Johnson was confirmed as an opponent for Seaman Albert Harvey, the middleweight champion of the Eastern Counties, however, as Johnson was unable to fight, Len Harvey deputised in his stead.

On 25 November, it was announced that Johnson had decided to retire from boxing and intended to become a manager, due to a severe attack of rheumatism in his elbows.

==== Return to the ring ====
By January 1933, Johnson had managed a variety of fighters including welterweight Tommy Kenny and heavyweight Bert Ikin. By April 1933, he challenged Jack Kid Casey, the Northern Area middleweight champion, to a contest. By May 1933, Johnson had decided to return as a boxer, with rumours of his possible opponent being Harry Crossley. On 18 May, it was revealed that Johnson would return to light-heavyweight to face Kid Scott, a protégée of Johnny Cuthbert, while having thoughts at possibly challenging for a light-heavyweight title in the future. In front of a crowd of 10,000 at Hyde Park, Sheffield, Johnson lost a narrow points-decision to Scott. Early in the bout, Scott had difficulty in penetrating Johnson's defence, and ultimately Scott's youth and strength served him well, and later he used a left hand effectively.

Johnson was set to return to the ring to face European light-heavyweight champion John Andersson on 29 May, however, Andersson was substituted for Kid Scott. On 29 May, nine days after losing to Scott, Johnson avenged his loss at the Royal Albert Hall after Scott quit on his stool after round-three. Scott walked to his corner, before blowing his nose and returning to resume the fight; though the referee, Charles Darby, stopped the contest in favour of Johnson. Scott had sustained a severe blow from Johnson over the temple, and was too dazed to continue. Of his defeat, Scott stated that everything went blank: "Len was hitting me about the head, and it must have been one of those punches that caught my temple. I have been boxing for three years, and never before experienced such an ordeal." He returned to the Royal Albert hall, on 26 June, to knockout Arthur Vermaut in the first round.

==== Moving to heavyweight ====
On 3 July, it was announced that the scheduled fight with Del Fontaine, the light-heavyweight champion of Canada, at Loftus Road was cancelled by doctors in attendance, who pronounced Johnson unfit, as he was suffering from a cataract in his left eye. The master of ceremonies introduced Johnson from the ring, and explained that the doctor who examined the eye announced that if Johnson fought it would be at the risk of permanent blindness.

On 22 August, articles were signed for a fifteen-round contest between Johnson and Eddie Pierce, the light-heavyweight champion of South Africa, at the Ring on 24 September. Shortly after, it was announced that Johnson would make his heavyweight debut against future British heavyweight champion Jack London at Liverpool Stadium on 31 August. Johnson, on the advice of his doctor, decided to abandon boxing, for it was thought that his eyesight would be permanently damaged were he to continue. However, a second examination by an eye specialist revealed that he was, at the time, suffering from a strain, and, after his weeks rest, his eyes are completely better again.

On 31 August, Johnson defeated heavyweight London via a points-decision at the Liverpool Stadium. The contest was a walk-over for Johnson, and was generally calling the tune, as far as boxing went, although there was always a dangerous of London getting home one of his heavy-rights he continually swung over. In the second-round, London connected a right and Johnson went down, though rising unhurt. London pressed home the advantage in weight by leaning on Johnson, while being warned several times for holding. Johnson opened, in what for him, what was a carefree mood: jumping in to land on the body, but two or three heavy-rights which he only just slipped caused him to pay more attention to his defence. In the fifth, Johnson unleashed a tremendous left-hook to the body, which London claimed to be low, put the heavyweight down for a count of five. London was greatly hurt, and in round-six, Johnson's punches seemed to take away what little strength London had, and for three rounds he was an easy target for Johnson. Towards the close of the ninth-round, a wild right from London opened a cut over Johnson's left eye, from which blood oozed freely, handicapping the Manchester man, and his opponent attempted to make a play for the wound, but was denied by the cleverness of Johnson. In the tenth, in trying to repeat his damaging left-hook to the body, Johnson landed low but the punch was only a light one and did no damage, and escaped the referee's attention. Due to London's inability to land on it, Johnson's damaged eye was not the disadvantage it might have been, and he not only kept going but completely outboxed and outfought London. Just before the end of the final bell, Johnson got home the left-hook to the body, which dropped London, who claimed a foul. He had only reached "two" when the gong signalled the end of the contest. On 9 September, it was revealed that Johnson's fight with Eddie Pierce had changed to 1 October.

==== Return to light-heavyweight ====
On 29 September, papers were signed for Johnson to meet Jim Winters, the light-heavyweight champion of Scotland, on 13 October. On 1 October, fighting through five rounds with his left eye completely closed and bruised, Johnson was defeated by Pierce via a technical-knockout in round-twelve at The Ring. Johnson displayed extreme courage and fortitude under a severe handicap, and after he had strenuously protested against the suggestion of his seconds and of the referee to abandon the fight at the end of the tenth-round. However, he had to retire, with the referee intervening in the eleventh-round, when Pierce was hitting Johnson with left and rights almost as he wished. It was later revealed that J. Bloom, Pierce's manager, had advised Pierce to adopt a bobbing and weaving technique due to Johnson's eyes not being too accurate due to his damaged eyesight.

After the Pierce loss, Johnson returned to the ring to face Jim Winters, however, was defeated via a points-decision at the Music Hall, Edinburgh on 12 October. One couldn't say that Johnson was a finished man, as he was still the foxy fighter of old, and in the last three rounds of the bout, Winters tried every move to get through the Mancunian's guard to land a finishing punch, but to no avail. Johnson appeared fresher at the finish than he had been at the end of the third round. Winters had a distinct advantage in weight - as he looked a trifle too big - and he made the most of it. On occasion, Johnson tried to take the initiative with pawing left-leads and short half-arm jolts to the body as he weaved in, but Winters was fast and employed the left well in the opening sessions, while his heavy work to the body soon caused Johnson to cover up. There was too much sparring in the opening-round, but Winters kept poking his left into Johnson's face. A few heavy body punches were landed in round-two, with Winters doing the leading-out work.

Midway through the third-session, the exchanges became keener, and both landed to the body, but Johnson's judgement was faulty. Winters continued to pile up the points, and in round-four was very aggressive with his left, with which he scored twice. Johnson seemed at sea with Winters' left, and he was told twice or thrice to lay off. Winters opposed the sixth-session with a slash to the jaw, and midway through Johnson was down for a count of three, and then was spoken to for a low hit. In that very round, Johnson came back and caused Winters to wince with a right to the body. The seventh and eight sessions were Johnson's best. In the former, he was enterprising enough to take a clip on the chin in order to get in a hard half-arm jolt to Winters' ribs, and he mixed matters well right up to the finish. Both missed in the early stages of the eighth-round, but Johnson brought his right into action to Winters' ribs. Winters was on top, and Johnson landed a right to Winters' jaw in a fierce rally, which became Johnson's best round. Winters opened round-nine with a well timed left, but Johnson retaliated with two-handed punching to the body. The covering-up work of Johnson was smart, and his elusiveness got him out of many tight corners. From the tenth to the end, Winters forced the fight and kept adding to his points tally, but to the credit of Johnson never left an opening for his younger and stronger opponent. Winters opened the eleventh-session with a left-lead and a right-swing before Johnson countered to the body. The last round finished in a hurricane fashion, with Winters using his left well. After he awarded Winters the verdict via points-decision, referee, Ben Green, announced Johnson's retirement from boxing, wherein the crowded house rose and cheered Johnson to the echo, as Johnson had become a popular figure by reason of his ability and good sportsmanship.

=== Retirement ===
On 11 October 1933, at the age of 30, Johnson announced that he was retiring from boxing on account to his failing eyesight. He ended his professional career with 96 wins in 135 fights, 37 by knockout, while competing in 6 title fights. Upon retiring, Johnson wrote: "Altogether, I have done not so badly considering that my first fights found me to be useless [...]", while adding that despite the setbacks and frustrations, and if he had his time over again: "[I] wouldn't have changed a thing".

== Personal life ==
In 1926, Johnson married Annie Forshaw, a former bookbinder of Irish descent; though sadly, while he was in the United States trying to launch his boxing career, one of their two children became ill and died. Johnson later revealed that they did not make it home in time for the child's burial. Following the tragedy, Johnson travelled back to America and stayed at Grupp's Gym in New York, where he sparred with Ted "Kid" Lewis and Mike McTigue, though an American debut fight fell through when Phil Kaplan turned the fight down. His marriage with Annie eventually fell apart and they divorced. Johnson later remarried, Maria Reid, a sister nurse whose three white children he adopted. Later, when Maria's sister died, the pair would go on to adopt her three children.

He was a close friend of Paul Robeson, the American singer and political activist, with both corresponding by letter for 30 years. Johnson was a teetotaller, and a member of the Lancashire section of the Showmen's Guild of Great Britain. While working as a truck driver in later years, Johnson began writing a monthly boxing column for The Daily Worker, and he was instrumental in forming the first Ex-Boxers' Association in Manchester in 1952, where it would eventually become the Ex-Boxers' Association of Great Britain. By the age of 70 he had finally managed to retire from his job as a foreman for Jack Silverman in Oldham, and once remarked that "if I had been a champion things would have been different". Johnson wrote an autobiographical essay of his life, part of his collection of works at the Working Class Movement Library in Salford, which also includes records and documents from the 1945 Congress.

== Later years ==
=== World War II and philanthropy ===
Although Johnson had given up active boxing, he was still connecting himself to the sport, such as refereeing for Jack McKnight v Jim Hunter at East Hull Baths on 18 December 1933, as well as a boxing trainer and discovering talent such as Matt Moran, Al Binney and Jack Samari. He also turned his hand to writing, producing a series of short stories set in the world of boxing which were published in The Topical Times, while he continued to drive Leyland Trucks since 1935. On 20 February 1939, also briefly tried his hand at professional wrestling, where he defeated Rough House Conroy at Ulster Hall. Johnson devoted himself to his boxing booth, which had already been touring for a number of years, appearing at fairs up and down the country.

He sold his booth when World War II began and worked in the Civil Defence Rescue Squad in Manchester, where he entered air raid damaged buildings to retrieve the injured or dead. Johnson later joined the unit in Cumbria as a specialist in first aid and physical training, to which his group officer, A.C. Rowell remarked that boxing was "the one subject he never talked about [and] he never encouraged any young person to become interested in this subject", a point which author Michael Herbert attributed to Johnson's wealth of experience of the injuries he sustained in the ring. He served with distinction in the National Fire Service, in which he received promotion. After the war he worked as a bus driver, only for tragedy to strike when a child stepped out into the road and was killed by the bus he was driving. He also worked as a bookie and had driven fire engines in Moss Side from 1939 as part of his role in the Transport and General Workers' Union. He later worked as a lorry driver for Jack Silverman in Oldham, while also being involved in matchmaking boxing shows during 1947 and 1948 at Ardwick Stadium. On 11 March 1949, Johnson announced that he was offering free tuition to aspiring young boxers at his club in Ducie-street, Oxford Road, to which he stated, "This is no catch. No scheme to find and exploit potential champions. I just feel I can help along youngsters who fancy the game and teach them things they ought to know." In 1949, he assisted members of the Unity Theatre, Manchester in their production of Clifford Odets' Golden Boy (1937).

=== Humanitarianism and politics ===
Johnson's encounters with racism and his observation of the poverty of most of his class in Britain, led him to radical politics. He was also aware that The Daily Worker had waged a ground-breaking campaign against the colour bar in boxing. These factors, in addition to the great popularity of the Soviet Union in the struggle against fascism during the Second World War, led to him joining the Communist Party of Great Britain by the end of the war. Additionally, in 1932, Johnson had come to know closely Paul Robeson, the American singer, actor and political activist, who encouraged Johnson in his long-running battle with the British boxing colour bar. In The Topical Times, in January 1933, Johnson wrote: "[Robeson] is a great man. [He] put new life in me with a few words. He drew me a picture of his fight for recognition. He pointed out that my job was fighting, and that if I could fight in the ring I ought to be able to fight outside it. I took his words to heart and made every effort to show the British public that the colour bar is just so much nonsense." According to Mike Luft, whose father fought for Johnson, Johnson's campaign on behalf of his fellow boxers was to ensure "they didn't get battered like he suffered", and his battling against discrimination and for civil rights made him an important example of "how there are different ways to fight, both in the ring and outside it".

He began speaking across Manchester from 1945, in discussions pertaining to Pan Africanism, sports and the colour bar, as well as the subject labour-communist unity alongside both Arthur Horner and J. B. S. Haldane. On 15 October 1945, and an additional five days, Johnson was one of the eighty-seven to ninety delegates who attended the 5th Pan-African Congress in Manchester, that represented fifty organizations, with a total of 200 audience members present. The topics debated included "The Colour Problem in Britain", "Oppression in South Africa", and "The Problems in the Caribbean". Notable delegates were George Padmore, Kwame Nkrumah, and Jomo Kenyatta, among others. A number of black activists living in Manchester at the time were also in attendance, including Johnson, Dr Pater Milliard from Guyana who had formed the Negro Association, T. Ras Makonnen of the International African Service Bureau (IASB) that C. L. R. James had established in 1937, and James Taylor, who ran the Negro Welfare Centre. The meetings led partially to the creation of the Pan-African Federation, founded in 1946 by Kwame Nkrumah and Jomo Kenyatta, as well as advancing Pan-Africanism and applying it to decolonize the African continent.

By 1946, Manchester's black community had increased to around 10,000 people, as black ex-servicemen and migrant workers settled down in areas such as Moss Side. Johnson, himself wise to the discrimination they were facing and could potentially face, set up the New International Club on Grafton Street with his friends Syd Booth and Wilf Charles – two white working-class Mancunians who had fought against the fascists in Spain. The New International attempted to channel what it called the "growing feeling of frustration" with substandard housing and jobs for black people in Manchester, and wanted to be both a social club and an organising space for black people to unite and solve their problems in Manchester. The principles of the club were declared in its founding statement: "true internationalism; colonial liberation; the ending of racial discrimination; peace." On 9 January 1947, it was reported that Johnson and a committee of leading townspeople were organising a petition to the American Ambassador in London, Lord Inverchapel, against the death sentence of two African American boys, aged fourteen, for alleged murder at Jackson, Mississippi. Johnson had hoped to get 10,000 signatures, whilst noting that time was short: "This week Governor of Mississippi, Fielding L. Wright, will announce the final decision on the fate of these children, and unless sanity prevails they will meet their death on January 17."

The club was friendly with I. T. A. Wallace-Johnson, and it had links with the Civil Rights Congress. The club's internationalist sensibility informed Johnson and Charles' local work in the city, where although they counted their membership at just 222, they were able to challenge racism at the Manchester Labour Exchange, whilst calling attention to inequalities in local housing, policing, and educational policy. The club was one of the first places to hold African and Caribbean club nights in Manchester, and where young black and white workers could blend and meet each other. But it was also the bedrock of building connections between Manchester's workers movement with black people all over the world, including, in December 1948, organising solidarity with the Trenton Six, a group of black men sentenced to death by an all-white jury for a murder they didn't commit.

The New International's biggest success was hosting Paul Robeson in 1949 in Manchester and Liverpool, where the guest of honour sang, was greeted at receptions, and spoke at public forms. In all, perhaps 20,000 people turned out for these events, which brought renewed funds and attention to the club. They were thus able to continue to hold conferences, publicise international campaigns, and defend workers of colour in marine, mining, and transport sectors, all while arguing that these activates were part of wider struggles against imperialism. On 28 August 1949, had his name taken by an undercover police officer after a meeting organised by Blackpool Communists on a beach, wherein he was the principal speaker. The meeting was in protest and defiance of the Blackpool Tory Town Council ban, to which Johnson argued that the ban closed an important avenue open to the ordinary people to have free speech. The Society's activities trailed off by the early 1950s, but as individuals, Johnson took part in the British "Let Robeson Sing" campaign - which according to Robeson's biographer "would be a considerable embarrassment to the U.S. government" - after Robeson's passport was revoked, while Wilf Charles went on to become an advocate for pensioners' rights in Manchester. The New International Club and other International African Service Bureau initiatives against British racism were an important part of the post-Congress activism within the United Kingdom.

Johnson also unsuccessfully stood for Moss Side East as a candidate for his party in 1949, 1955 and 1961 to become elected to Manchester City Council, though acted for many years as an unofficial representative of the city's black community – personally intervening in disputes involving inequality and racism.

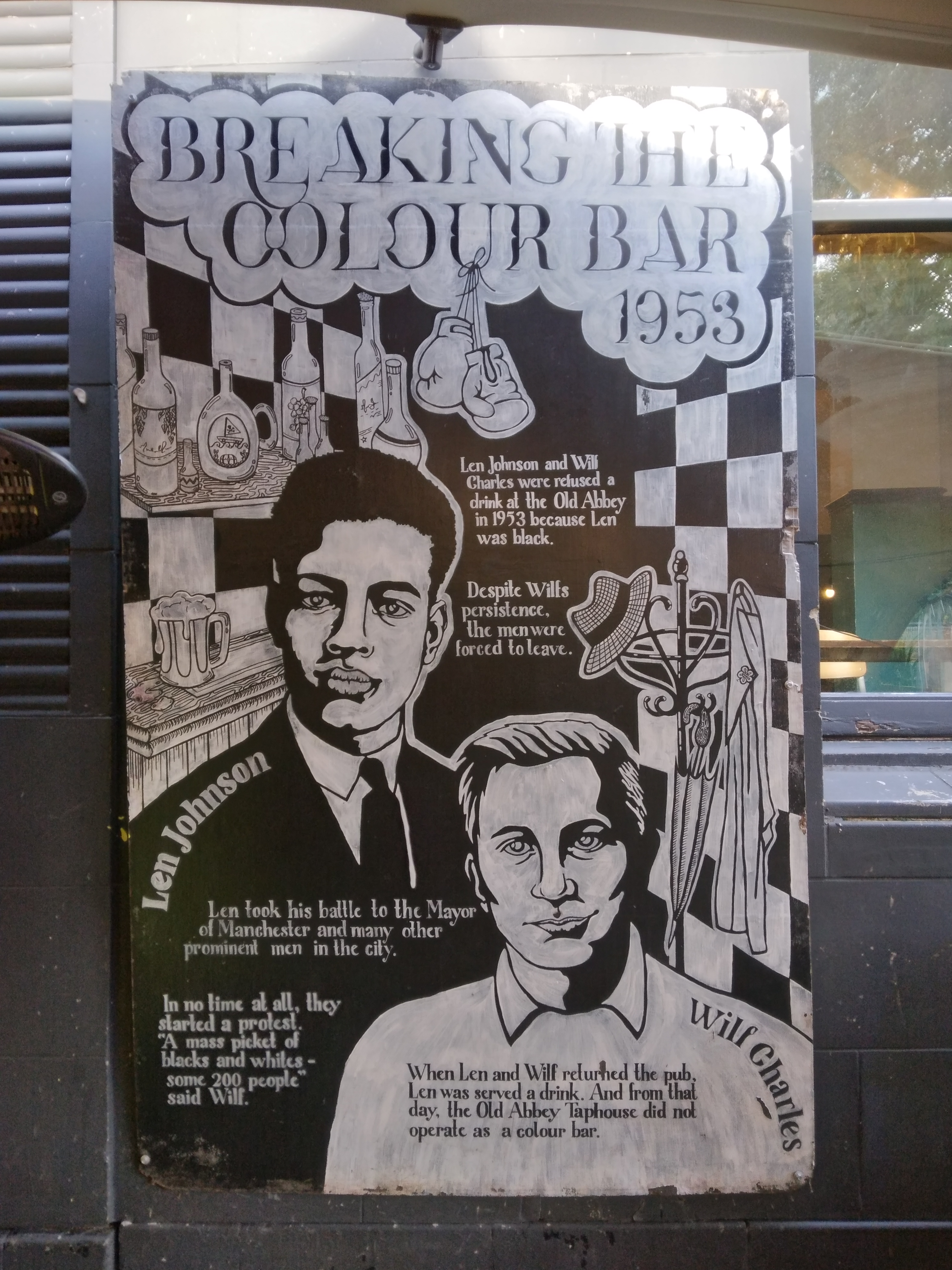
A memorial at the Old Abbey Taphouse in Greenheys, Manchester commemorating Johnson's breaking of the 'colour bar' in 1953

On 30 September 1953, he played a significant role in overturning the Old Abbey Taphouse in Greenheys' policy on separating white and black patrons. According to Wilf Charles, friend and co-founder of the New International Club, Johnson had "ordered two pints and they said we don't serve Black men [...] I insisted they would serve him or no-one else would get served. So they brought in the police and they asked us to go—we created a tremendous problem inside the pub." Of the incident, Johnson stated "I was most embarrassed. I have spent the greater part of my life in Manchester and this is the first time I have ever been refused a drink." On 1 October 1953, he launched a campaign and enlisted the help of the then Lord Mayor of Manchester, Abraham Moss and the Bishop of Manchester, William Greer and over the course of the next three days, more than 200 people, black and white, gathered to take part in a demonstration outside, standing together against the licensee's ban. Eventually it was overturned and Johnson - who was teetotal - was invited inside and sat down to share a drink with the publican.

=== Death ===
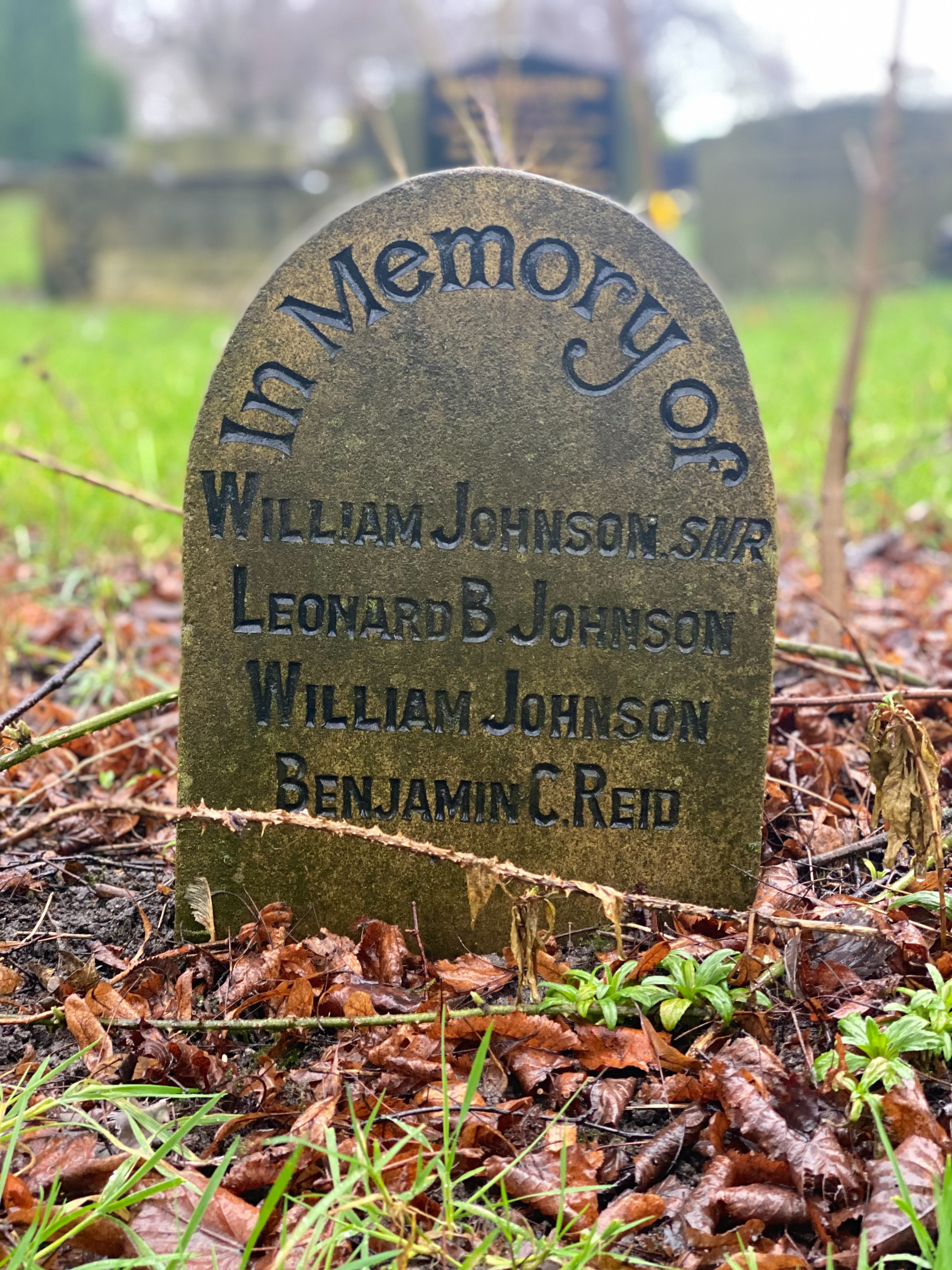
Len Johnson's grave in Southern Cemetery, Manchester

In 1954, health problems resulted in him spending several months convalescing at a Black Sea resort in the Soviet Union for a pneumonectomy, and later returned to England to resume his political activities in the Communist Party, though lived for years in relative anonymity and growing poverty. By the early sixties, Johnson's physical health was in rapid decline, of which he spent at Waterloo Street, Oldham, with his wife Maria. Johnson died on 28 September 1974 at Oldham General Hospital, and The Morning Star ran an obituary written by Jim Arnison. Johnson died two years before Britain passed the landmark Race Relations Act 1976 and thus did not see the faltering progress as Britain evolved into an ever more diverse, multi-racial nation. In his obituary for the Manchester Evening News he was quoted as saying: "[I was] never a fighter, always a boxer, and all for a fiver and second-class travelling expenses."

==== Memorial ====
In June 2020, Stephen Miller started a petition on Change.org to erect a statue of Johnson in Piccadilly Gardens, following the toppling of the Statue of Edward Colston on 7 June. Following Miller's example, on 10 June, Deej Malik-Johnson started a similar petition for a monument to be included for Johnson, based on his contributions to Manchester. On 10 June, British Labour Party politician Afzal Khan had openly encouraged the idea of memorialising Johnson. By October 2020, almost 800 people signed Malik-Johnson's petition calling for Manchester City Council to build a permanent monument honouring Johnson to be built in Manchester.

When asked whether he'd support the proposal, the leader of Manchester City Council, Sir Richard Leese, stated it to be a "brilliant" idea, to which he remarked "I think it would be great to have a statue of [Johnson] in Manchester if people want to come forward with proposals [...] We've only got a couple of busts or status of black Mancunians, the very first one was done in the late 1980s when there was a bust of Yomi Mambu, who was the first black Lord Mayor of Manchester." Additionally, Andy Burnham, the Mayor of Greater Manchester, stated that Johnson's story was one that "hasn't been told enough [..] He wasn't just a boxer, it was more what he did to contribute to the civil rights movement, working with the likes of Paul Robeson and others, which was perhaps his biggest contribution." On 20 October 2020, the topics of a permanent memorial and Johnson's difficulties with the National Sporting Club and the British Boxing Board of Control were mentioned by Welsh Labour Party politicians Gerald Jones and Nick Smith, respectively, at the Palace of Westminster.

=== Legacy ===
Today, the legacy of Johnson is widely forgotten. However, he was once considered one of the greatest welterweights and middleweights of his age by many fellow boxers, boxing experts and publications:

- Ron Olver, correspondent of The Ring and former assistant editor of Boxing News remarked: "He was well-respected both as a fighter and as a man, but found himself battling against an opponent he could never lick — the colour bar. Noted for his defensive skills, he had a gem of a left hand and could block punches in a style rarely seen today."
- Len Harvey, three divisional British champion and world light-heavyweight contender, maintained the view: "Len was one of the finest boxers I have ever met. Only his colour prevented him from winning the highest honours in the game. He had a perfect style, and it was a joy to watch him using that colossally long left of his, unless, of course, you happened to be facing the business end of it."
- Harry Jennings, a sports writer for The Leeds Mercury, expressed: "That Johnson is one of the cleverest artists of the era is beyond dispute."
- The Sheffield Telegraph proclaimed that "[Johnson] is undoubtedly one of the best boxers in the world. He already has to his credit a decision over Harry Crossley [...]".
- Martin Pugh, historian and author, wrote in We Danced All Night that Johnson was "one of the best welterweights of the period [...]".
- Eugene Corri, well known British boxing referee, included Johnson on his 1925 honours list of coming champions, in which he wrote: "Johnson has been a noted name among [black] pugilists, including the great and only Jack Johnson [...]". He later remarked of Johnson that, "My diagnosis of Johnson is this: that he has a streak of indifference, inborn or assumed, and prefers to amble to victory rather than employ all his natural gifts, so as to crash his way to triumph. I have been often tempted to say that if Johnson were not sure that he is a master of defensive boxing, we should rate him to be the finest specimen of a middleweight we have produced for years."
- Eric Stone, sports writer for The Leicester Evening Mail, wrote: "The night that Harry Corbett lost his title, Len Harvey won a title. Yet, it was not long before that Harvey had been beaten by a man who had stopped the great Kid Lewis. That man was Len Johnson: one of the greatest middleweights we have ever seen."
- The Western Morning News described Johnson as "one of the most skillful boxers of the day."
- The Belfast Telegraph acknowledged Johnson as, "one of the cleverest defensive boxers of his age [...]".
- Harold Lewis, sports writer for The Westminster Gazette, wrote of Johnson: "[...] a more relentless in-fighter than Ted "Kid" Lewis there never was.", while describing his defence as "impregnable".
- The Liverpool Echo in praising Johnson, wrote: "As a middleweight he was about the cleverest boxer at that weight in the world."
- Solar Plexus, sports writer for The Referee, praised Johnson and compared him to Jem Mace: "Victory came to Johnson per medium of the old Jem Mace style. Some say it is obsolete and of no avail against the methods of today, but they do not understand their business. With but one exception Johnson is very much of the old school."
- The Brisbane Courier wrote: "Ever since the English middleweight champion, Len Johnson landed in Australia [...] Brisbane followers of boxing have been anxious to again see this exponent of the Jem Mace school of boxing in action."
- James Butler, a sports writer for The Daily Herald, regarded Johnson as "one of the cleverest boxers in Europe."
- Ben Green, a British referee, regarded Johnson as "one of the greats" whilst acknowledging him as one of the greatest British middleweights.
- The Referee wrote: "A good big man in boxing should always beat a good little man. When the big man has abnormal reach and good height, allied with real boxing skill, he is generally an artist in the roped area. Such a man is Len Johnson."
- Pollux, sports writer for The Daily Herald, while noting Johnson's "rare defence", had remarked that "His boxing has improved wonderfully during the past few months, and Ted "Kid" Lewis will find his equal in ringcraft."
- Dr Neil Carter, senior research fellow at De Montfort University, wrote: "[Johnson] from Manchester was reckoned to be the best welterweight in Europe in the 1920s but was unable to prove this because of his colour."

==== Popular culture ====
Johnson inspired British lightweight champion Frank Johnson, who took the surname "Johnson" in homage to his hero. In 1987, a musical based on the life and work of the Johnson, Struggle for Freedom, was the final part of the performance by young people from Rochdale schools, which was produced by Frontline Culture and Education and directed by British playwright Dan Baron Cohen. Baron Cohen acknowledged the contributions of Sid Booth, who was involved in the original production which toured Ireland, Wilf Charles whose life helped shape the play and African Dawn, the African cultural group from London. On 15 July 2014, Len Johnson Fighter, a play focusing on Johnson's, and written by Colin Conner and directed by Nick Birchill, debuted at the 2014 Greater Manchester Fringe Festival. Colin Conner's play was inspired by Michael Herbert's book Never Counted Out (1992), and the collection of Johnson's memorabilia at the Working Class Movement Library in Salford. After its runs at the Fringe Festival in 2014, Len Johnson Fighter performed at the King's Arms, Salford from 11 May, to 12 May 2015, and later the Octagon Theatre, Bolton from 20 May, to 21 May 2015. The cast consisted of Jarreau Benjamin, Alastair Gillies, Richard Patterson, Matt Lanigan, Sarah Burrill and Katie McArdle. Benjamin, who was nominated for a Manchester Theatre Award for his portrayal of Len, remarked: "I'm so passionate about all the things he was fighting for. He was a boxer and he went on to do some amazing things. I'm really glad to be a part of it. It is really emotional." On 31 December 2019, Peter Howarth created a piece of digital artwork titled Nobody Knows, featuring Johnson, Leone Jacovacci and Jack Johnson.

== See also ==
- Dorothy Kuya
- Billy Strachan
- Charlie Hutchison
- Trevor Carter
- Claudia Jones

== Notes ==
Regional boxing titles
New title	Northern Area middleweight champion 6 April 1925 – 16 April 1930; Vacated	Vacant Title next held by Joe (Young) Lowther
Vacant Title last held by Roland Todd	Commonwealth middleweight champion 20 February 1926 – 12 July 1926; Vacated	Vacant Title next held by Tommy Milligan
New title	Northern Area light-heavyweight champion 3 June 1929 – 30 June 1929; Vacated	Vacant Title next held by Harry Crossley
