= Stirling Road railway station =

Disused railway station in Carluke, North Lanarkshire

Coordinates: 55.7669°N 3.8696°W

Stirling Road

General information
- Location: Carluke, North Lanarkshire; Scotland
- Platforms: 2

Other information
- Status: Disused

History
- Original company: Wishaw and Coltness Railway
- Pre-grouping: Caledonian Railway

Key dates
- 8 May 1843: Opened
- 1848: Name changed to Stirling Road
- 1853: Closed
Location

Stirling Road railway station served the town of Carluke, North Lanarkshire, Scotland from 1843 to 1853 on the Wishaw and Coltness Railway.

== History ==
The station opened as Carluke and Lanark on 8 May 1843 by the Wishaw and Coltness Railway. It had several sidings and a line that served Coltness Iron Works. The station's name was changed to Stirling Road in 1848. It closed in 1853.

Preceding station	Disused railways	Following station
Overtown; Line and station closed	Caledonian Railway; Wishaw and Coltness Railway	Morningside; Line and station closed
