= Tommy Milligan =

Scottish boxer (1904–1970)

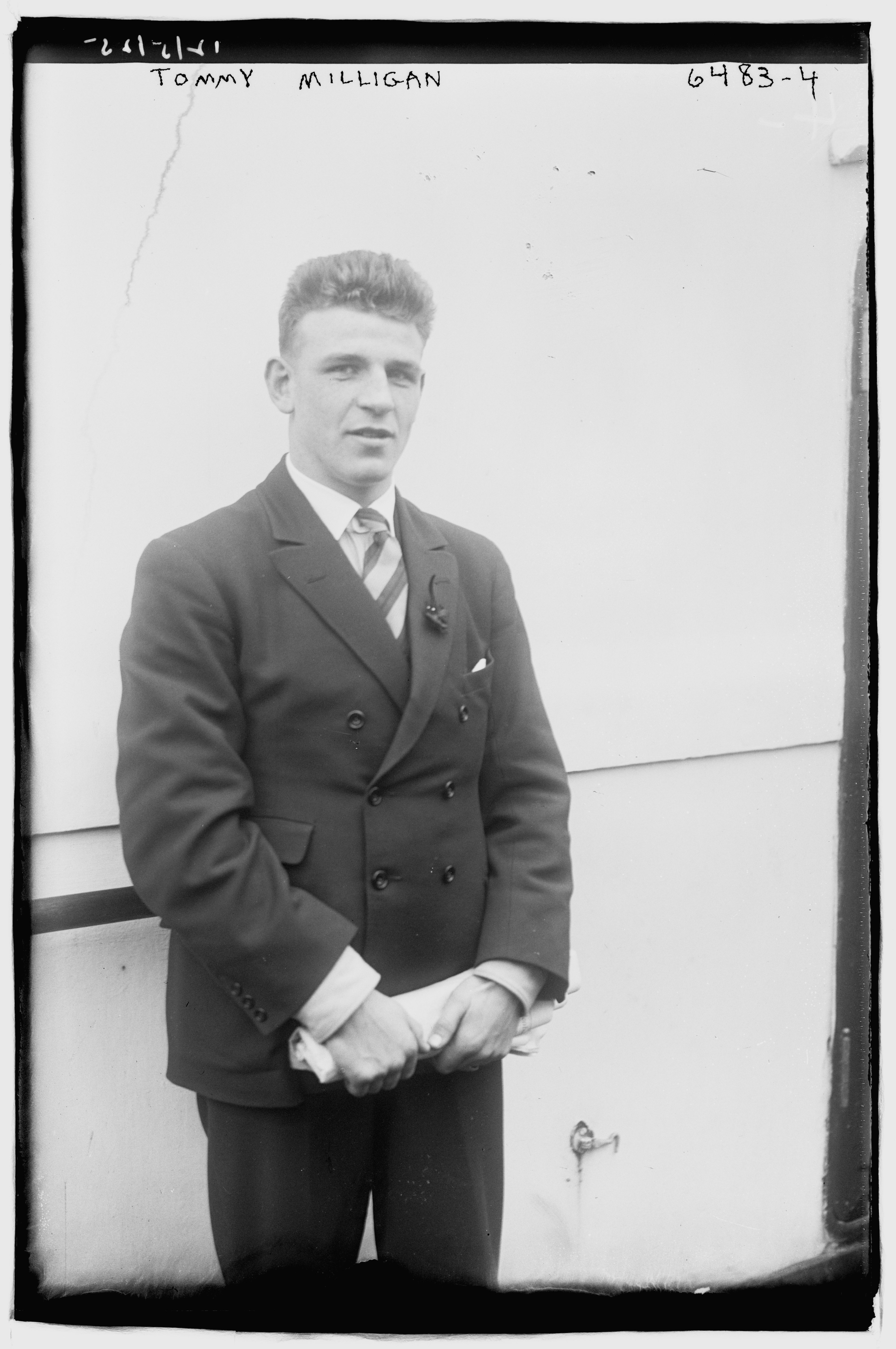

Personal information
- Nationality: Scottish
- Born: Thomas Milligan; 2 March 1904 Shieldmuir, Wishaw, Scotland
- Died: 17 December 1970 (aged 66) King's Park, Glasgow, Scotland
- Weight: welter/middleweight

Boxing career

Boxing record
- Total fights: 51
- Wins: 42 (KO 20)
- Losses: 9 (KO 3)

Thomas Milligan (2 March 1904 – 17 December 1970) born in Shieldmuir, Wishaw was a Scottish professional welter/middleweight boxer of the 1920s.

== Early years ==
Milligan was a childhood friend of Hughie Gallacher. While Gallacher decided on football over boxing, Milligan went on to have a successful career in the ring. Milligan won the Scottish Area welterweight title, the National Sporting Club (NSC) (subsequently known as the British Boxing Board of Control (BBBofC)) British welterweight title, British Empire welterweight title, European Boxing Union (EBU) welterweight title, the National Sporting Club (NSC) (subsequently known as the British Boxing Board of Control (BBBofC)) British middleweight title, British Empire middleweight title, European Boxing Union (EBU) middleweight title (twice), and was a world middleweight title challenger against Mickey Walker, his professional fighting weight varied from 142 lb (64 kg; 10 st 2 lb), i.e. welterweight to 159 1/2 lb (72.3 kg; 11 st 5.5 lb), i.e. middleweight.

== Championships ==
=== Continental and International ===
- EBU Welterweight Championship
- EBU Middleweight Championship (twice)
- CBC Welterweight Championship
- CBC Middleweight Championship

=== National ===
- BBBofC Middleweight Championship
- BBBofC Welterweight Championship
- BBBofC Scottish Area Welterweight Championship
