= Wishaw South railway station =

Disused railway station in Wishaw, North Lanarkshire

Wishaw South

General information
- Location: Wishaw, North Lanarkshire; Scotland
- Coordinates: 55.7668°N 3.9305°W
- Grid reference: NS789354
- Platforms: 2

Other information
- Status: Disused

History
- Original company: Wishaw and Coltness Railway
- Pre-grouping: Caledonian Railway
- Post-grouping: LMS

Key dates
- 20 March 1841: Opened as Wishaw
- 1 June 1880: Renamed Wishaw South
- 15 September 1958: Closed
Location

Wishaw South was one of two stations that served the town of Wishaw in Scotland between 1841 and 1958, the other station being Wishaw Central. It was on the Caledonian Main Line, which was later known as the West Coast Main Line.

== History ==
The station opened on 20 March 1841, on the same day as Overtown station, by the Wishaw and Coltness Railway. It was situated 16 miles (26 km) south of Glasgow on the West Coast Main Line and was on an embankment. There was also a goods yard that was at ground level with the station, which was used as an oil depot. This was later closed. The station closed in 1958.

Preceding station	Disused railways	Following station
Wishaw Central	Caledonian Railway; Main Line	Overtown; Line open, station closed
