= Overtown railway station =

Disused railway station in Overtown, North Lanarkshire

Coordinates: 55.7607°N 3.9017°W

Overtown

General information
- Location: Overtown, North Lanarkshire; Scotland
- Platforms: 2

Other information
- Status: Disused

History
- Original company: Wishaw and Coltness Railway
- Pre-grouping: Caledonian Railway
- Post-grouping: London, Midland and Scottish Railway

Key dates
- 8 May 1843: First station opened
- January 1881: Second station opened as Overtown Waterloo
- 1 October 1881: First station closed
- 1886: Second station name changed to Overtown
- 1 January 1917: Closed
- 1 January 1919: Reopened
- 5 October 1942: Closed permanently
Location

Overtown railway station, also known as Overtown Road railway station, served the village of Overtown, North Lanarkshire, Scotland from 1843 to 1942 on the Wishaw and Coltness Railway.

== History ==
=== First station ===
The first station opened on 8 May 1843 by the Wishaw and Coltness Railway. To the northwest was a private line that served Overtown Station Colliery and Coltness Iron Works. To the south was a dock line. The station disappeared from Bradshaw in March 1848 but reappeared in April 1850. A second station opened in January 1881, rendering this one obsolete so it closed on 1 October 1881.

=== Second station ===
The second station opened as Overtown Waterloo in January 1881. It was located closer to Waterloo than Overtown, hence the name. It was renamed Overtown in 1886. There were no goods facilities but it had a footbridge and station buildings. The station closed on 1 January 1917 but reopened on 1 January 1919, before closing permanently on 5 October 1942.

| Preceding station | Disused railways | Following station |
|---|---|---|
| Wishaw South; Line and station closed | Caledonian Railway; Wishaw and Coltness Railway | Stirling Road; Line and station closed |
