= Shieldmuir railway station =

Railway station in North Lanarkshire, Scotland

Shieldmuir
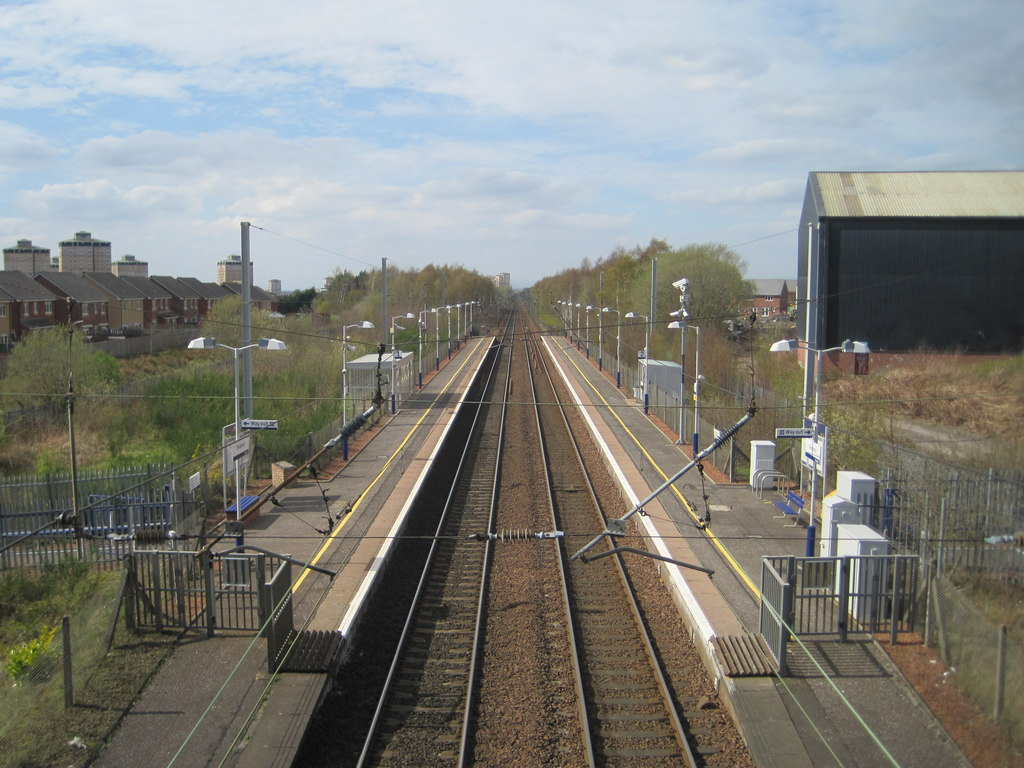

General information
- Location: Wishaw, North Lanarkshire; Scotland
- Coordinates: 55.7774°N 3.9578°W
- Grid reference: NS773554
- Manager: ScotRail
- Platforms: 2

Other information
- Station code: SDM

Key dates
- 14 May 1990: Opened

Passengers
- 2021/22: ▲54,514
- 2022/23: ▲84,282
- 2023/24: ▲0.112 million
- 2024/25: ▲0.122 million
- 2025/26: ▲0.133 million
Location
Notes
- Passenger statistics from the Office of Rail and Road

Shieldmuir railway station is a railway station in the Craigneuk suburb of Wishaw, North Lanarkshire, Scotland, and lies on the West Coast Main Line, although it is not served by mainline services – local commuter services from the station are provided via the Argyle Line by ScotRail on behalf of Strathclyde Partnership for Transport. The station is close to Wishaw railway station. The bulk of commuters are from the nearby suburbs of Craigneuk and Muirhouse, between which the station spans the border between. The bridge used to cross the railway also connects the two towns. Although Shieldmuir can be used to reach Wishaw General Hospital by train, it and Wishaw station are both a considerable distance away for any visitors there.

== History ==
There is no modern town of Shieldmuir, but Shieldmuir Plantation is noted on an 1859 map of the area, as having existed between Shieldmuir and Muirhouse coalpits, roughly where the station lies today.

The station was originally developed to help regenerate this area of Wishaw, which has suffered from the closure of two major businesses (British Steel Corporation's Ravenscraig works and the Clyde Alloy). Its usage has increased, but its remote location led to vandalism and intimidation for users prior to the installation of CCTV there. Proposals to move the station may be met with some opposition though, as the area around the station has recently seen large amounts of house building activity, and closure of the station could affect local house prices.

The local authority proposed in 2005, to either move the entire station almost 1 mile (1.6 km) to the north or close it and reopen the former Flemington station nearby (closed in 1965), to cater for the new Ravenscraig development. This plan was subsequently dropped in 2007.

== Services ==
The station is served by a half-hourly service (more during weekday peak hours, hourly on Sundays) between Lanark and Glasgow Central via Motherwell, Bellshill and Cambuslang. Prior to the December 2014 timetable change, trains ran via Central Low Level to stations on the North Clyde Line but no longer do so – passengers now need to change at Cambuslang or Central to reach these destinations.

Shieldmuir is also the northern terminus for the Royal Mail's railway-based distribution system – a large mail depot lies next to the station, from which the Royal Mail operates its fleet of Class 325 mail trains to and from London and Warrington via the WCML.

The station is unstaffed and has ramp access to comply with the Disability Discrimination Act. It has full CCTV coverage on both platforms and entrances. It can be reached by car from Craigneuk due to its proximity to John Street and Kimberly Street; however, there is a relatively lengthy footpath between the station and Shieldmuir Street, Muirhouse. A 25 space park and ride facility opened in April 2021. It cannot be directly reached by any of the new private housing estates being built near the site.

Preceding station	National Rail	Following station
Wishaw	ScotRail; Argyle Line	Motherwell

== Sources ==
- Butt, R. V. J. (October 1995). The Directory of Railway Stations: details every public and private passenger station, halt, platform and stopping place, past and present (1st ed.). Sparkford: Patrick Stephens Ltd. ISBN 978-1-85260-508-7. OCLC 60251199. OL 11956311M.
