= Flemington railway station (Scotland) =

Disused railway station in Motherwell, North Lanarkshire

Coordinates: 55.7822°N 3.9700°W

Flemington

General information
- Location: Motherwell, North Lanarkshire; Scotland
- Platforms: 2

Other information
- Status: Disused

History
- Original company: Caledonian Railway
- Post-grouping: London, Midland and Scottish Railway; British Rail (Scottish Region)

Key dates
- 2 March 1891: Opened
- 4 January 1965: Closed
Location

Flemington railway station was situated on the boundary of Motherwell and Craigneuk (near Wishaw), Scotland from 1891 to 1965 on the Wishaw and Coltness Railway.

== History ==
The station opened on 2 March 1891 by the Caledonian Railway. The signal box, which opened with the station, was to the west of the westbound platform and the goods yard was to the south. To the north were sidings as well as Lanarkshire steel works. The station closed on 4 January 1965.

Preceding station	Disused railways	Following station
Motherwell; Line closed, station open	Caledonian Railway; Wishaw and Coltness Railway	Shieldmuir; Line closed, station open
	Historical railways	
Motherwell; Line and station open	West Coast Main Line	Shieldmuir; Line and station open
