= Morningside railway station (Caledonian) =

Disused railway station in Morningside, North Lanarkshire

Coordinates: 55.7749°N 3.8630°W

Morningside

General information
- Location: Morningside, North Lanarkshire; Scotland
- Platforms: 1

Other information
- Status: Disused

History
- Original company: Wishaw and Coltness Railway
- Pre-grouping: Caledonian Railway
- Post-grouping: London, Midland and Scottish Railway

Key dates
- October 1844: Opened
- 1848: Closed
- 15 May 1867: Reopened
- 1 January 1917: Closed again
- 2 June 1919: Reopened again
- 1 December 1930: Closed permanently
Location

Morningside railway station served the village of Morningside, North Lanarkshire, Scotland from 1844 to 1930 on the Wishaw and Coltness Railway.

== History ==
The station opened in October 1844 by the Wishaw and Coltness Railway. To the west were two sidings and a turntable. To the southeast was the signal box. Behind the platform was Allanton Brick and Tile Works, which one of the sidings may have been used for. The station closed in 1848 but reopened three years after another station of the same name on 15 May 1867. It closed again on 1 January 1917 but reopened on 2 June 1919, before closing permanently on 1 December 1930.

| Preceding station | Disused railways | Following station |
|---|---|---|
| Stirling Road; Line and station closed | Caledonian Railway; Wishaw and Coltness Railway | Terminus |
