= Dempsey (film) =

- Genre: Biography; Drama
- Written by: Edward DiLorenzo
- Directed by: Gus Trikonis
- Starring: Treat Williams; Sally Kellerman; Victoria Tennant; Robert Harper; Sam Waterston; Jimmy Nickerson; Clay Hodges; Eli Cummins
- Music by: Billy Goldenberg
- Country of origin: United States
- Original language: English

Production
- Executive producer: Charles W. Fries
- Producer: Jay Benson
- Production location: Los Angeles
- Cinematography: Sol Negrin; Ric Waites
- Editor: Thomas Fries
- Running time: 112 minutes
- Production company: Charles Fries Productions

Original release
- Network: CBS
- Release: September 28, 1983

Dempsey is a 1983 television film based on the life of the heavyweight boxer Jack Dempsey that starred Treat Williams and Sally Kellerman.

== Plot ==
Jack Dempsey starts out fighting in bars for half the take. He wins his first professional fight. After a later bout, he and his manager are held up at gunpoint and robbed of the purse. He sees the thieves later and beats them up to recover the cash.

Jack meets Maxine Cates, but goes to New York to box. After a bout with John Lester Johnson is a draw, he breaks with his manager and goes back to Salt Lake City and marries Maxine.

After money disputes with her Maxine leaves, and Dempsey goes to San Francisco. Kerns becomes his manager. He wins fights, goes to New York, and divorces Maxine. He beats Jess Willard by a TKO and becomes heavyweight champ.

Dempsey goes to Hollywood to make films and gets sued for non-support by Maxine. He fights Luis Ángel Firpo and is knocked out of the ring, but still wins. He is sick (perhaps poisoned), but still fights Gene Tunney and loses a decision.

On September 22, 1927, he fights Tunney again. Dempsey knocks Tunney down, but the count doesn't start until Dempsey goes to a neutral corner. This gives Tunney time to recover and get up when the count reaches 9. In this famous "long count" fight Tunney wins by decision.

== Cast ==
- Treat Williams as Jack Dempsey
- Sally Kellerman as Maxine Cates
- Sam Waterston as "Doc" Kearns
- Victoria Tennant as Estelle Taylor
- Robert Harper as Damon Runyon
- Jimmy Nickerson as Gene Tunney
- Clay Hodges as Jess Willard
- Eli Cummins as Luis Ángel Firpo
- Bonnie Bartlett as Celia Dempsey
- John McLiam as Hyrum Dempsey
- Peter Mark Richman as Tex Rickard
- Jesse Vint as Bernie Dempsey
- James Noble as Gavin McNab
- John Lehne as Gene Normile
- Cliff Emmich as Otto
- Michael McManus as Babe Ruth
- Robert Darnell as John Reisler
- Mark L. Taylor as Price

== See also ==
- List of boxing films
