= Jess Willard vs. Jack Dempsey =

Boxing match

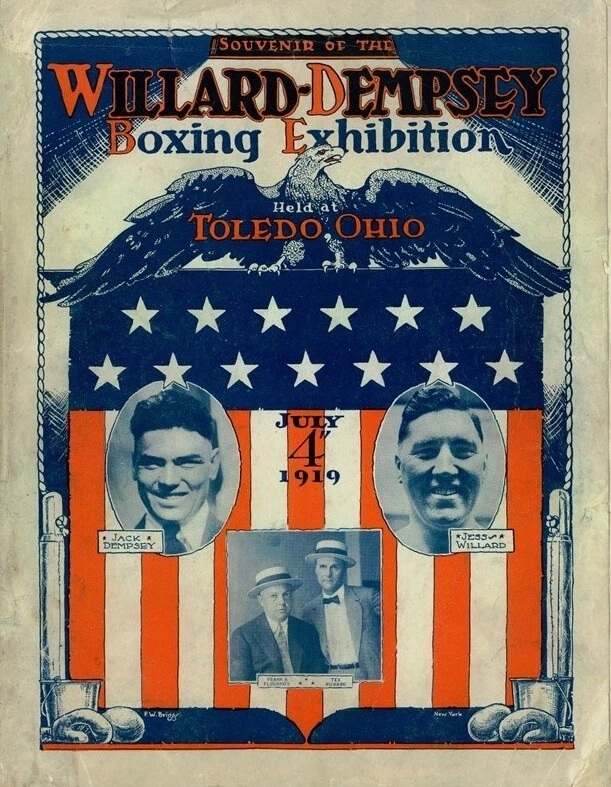
- Date: July 4, 1919
- Venue: Bay View Park Arena, Toledo, Ohio, U.S.
- Title(s) on the line: World heavyweight championship

Tale of the tape
| Boxer | Jess Willard | Jack Dempsey |
| Nickname | "Pottawatomie Giant" | "The Manassa Mauler" |
| Hometown | Saint Clere, Kansas, U.S. | Manassa, Colorado, U.S. |
| Purse | $100,000 | $27,500 |
| Pre-fight record | 21–3–1 (6) (19 KO) | 56–4–9 (6) (46 KO) |
| Age | 37 years, 6 months | 24 years |
| Height | 6 ft 6 1/2 in (199 cm) | 6 ft 1 in (185 cm) |
| Weight | 245 lb (111 kg) | 187 lb (85 kg) |
| Style | Orthodox | Orthodox |
| Recognition | World; Heavyweight Champion | |

Result
- Dempsey defeats Willard by 3rd round RTD

Jess Willard vs. Jack Dempsey was a professional boxing match contested on July 4, 1919, for the world heavyweight championship.

== Background ==
Since stopping Jack Johnson to win the world heavyweight championship in April 1915, Jess Willard had made just a single defence of the title, defeating Frank Moran in March 1916, at Madison Square Garden. A July 1918 bout with top contender Fred Fulton was called off due to the United States' continued involvement in the First World War.

Meanwhile Jack Dempsey had been building his reputation with a series of knockout victories, including a 1st round stoppage of Fulton in July 1918 made him the leading contender for the title.

On 10 February 1919, the two men signed to fight on 4 July, with Tex Rickard promoting the bout. In May the venue was confirmed as Toledo, Ohio.

By the day of fight, Dempsey had fought 51 times since Willard's last bout. Despite this Willard was a 6 to 5 favourite to win.

== The fight ==
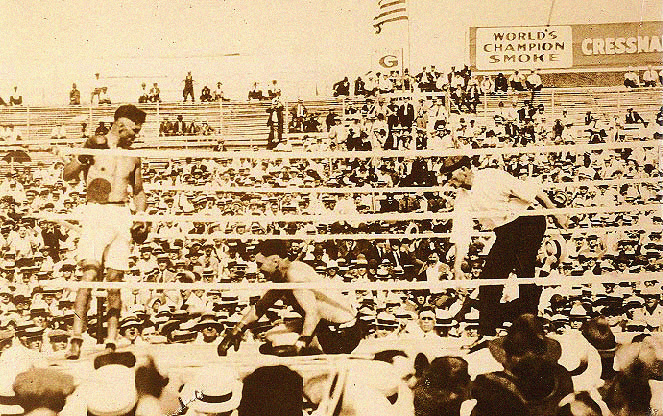
Dempsey (left) just after dropping Willard (right)

Dempsey would drop Willard with a left hook in the first round, the first time that the champion had been down in his career. Dempsey knocked Willard down a further 6 times in the round, however the rules at the time permitted standing almost over a knocked down opponent and hitting him again as soon as both gloves had left the canvas. At the end of the round Dempsey left the ring mistakenly thinking referee Ollie Pecord had just counted out Willard and that the fight was over. However the timekeeper (W. Warren Barbour) had blown his whistle to end round before the end of count but neither Pecord or Dempsey had heard it over the crowd. Dempsey could have been disqualified for this mistake however Willard had economised by not employing professional cornermen and they failed to insist on application of the regulations, as a result the bout continued.

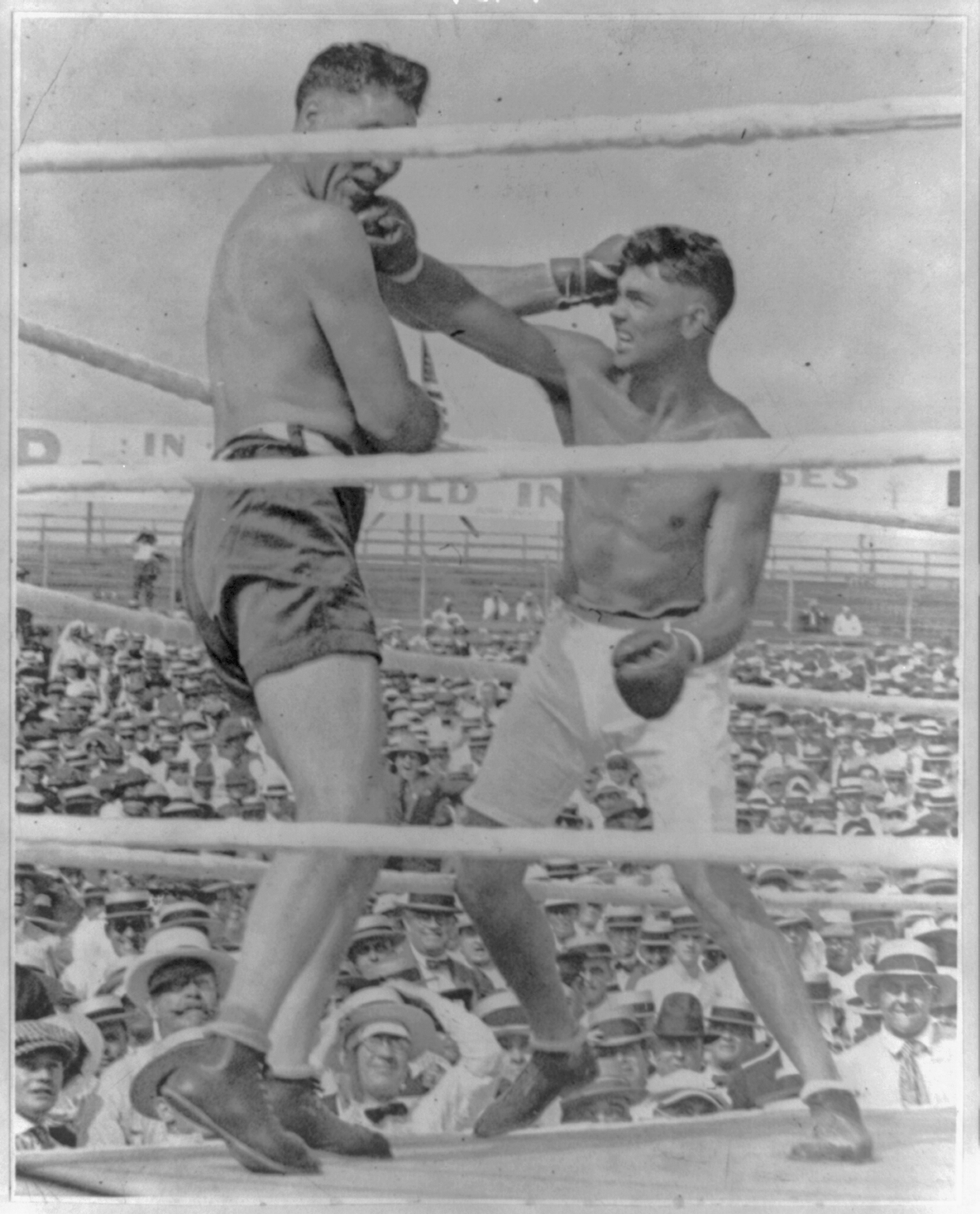
Dempsey landing a right punch to the jaw of Willard

Dempsey was unable to drop the champion after the first round but he remained on top until Willard's corner stopped the bout before the start of 4th, making Dempsey the new world champion.

== Aftermath ==
Following the match Dempsey said "I told you I would knock him out in the first round and to all intent and purpose that is what I did. He took a lot of punishment in the next two rounds but was so feeble that I hated to have to hit him." The former champion was quoted as saying, "Dempsey is a remarkable hitter. It was the first time that I had ever been knocked off my feet. I have sent many birds home in the same bruised condition that I am in, and now I know how they felt. I sincerely wish Dempsey all the luck possible and hope that he garnishes all the riches that comes with the championship. I have had my fling with the title. I was champion for four years and I assure you that they'll never have to give a benefit for me. I have invested the money I have made".

There were conflicting reports of the extent of the injuries suffered by Willard during the bout with some claiming he suffered a broken jaw, cheekbone, and ribs, as well as losing several teeth while others claimed that he only suffered a deep cut over the eye and a badly cut mouth.

Dempsey would announce the following day that he would only defend his title against white heavyweights, drawing a colour line to exclude all black challengers, including Harry Wills, regarded as the World "Colored" Heavyweight Champion.

=== Controversy ===
In the January 20, 1964 issue of Sports Illustrated, Dempsey's former manager Jack Kearns (whom he had fired in 1923), claimed that he had informed Dempsey he had wagered his share of the purse favouring a Dempsey win with a first-round knockout. Kearns (who had died the previous July) further stated he had applied plaster of Paris to the wrappings on the fighter's hands. Dempsey would subsequently sue publishers Time Inc. for $3 million, setting out of court. Kearns' story was at odds with the other witnesses to Dempsey's hands being wrapped and Boxing Illustrated would later show that the plaster would crack the first time that it hit someone, casing serious doubt on the theory.

When interviewed by Harry Carpenter in the 1960s, Willard told him, "I'll show you, how I was beaten." He then drew a metal bolt from a box, saying that Dempsey held the bolt in his hand, not within the glove but at the palm of it, attached to the thumb sideways, and used the bolt rather for cutting-and-slicing-like moves to inflict blood-spilling cuts and pain, relinquishing it just as the bout was stopped, and according to Willard, the bolt was found on the floor of the ring at the end of the fight and he kept it. Mike Tyson, who studied the case in-depth and very thoroughly, later joined Carpenter to discuss the subject. Tyson, a great admirer of Dempsey's, admitted that "he just did whatever Jack Kearns told him to do" and "in those days anything could have happened", for that there was no agency or other legal authority at the time that was officially empowered to oversee and protect fighters from violations of such kind. However, footage before the fight shows Dempsey putting on his gloves with no additional objects and in full view of Willard, his team and the crowd. Also Dempsey can be seen at various times during the fight pushing and holding with Willard with the palm of the glove in question and holding on to the ropes with both hands, making it next to impossible that he had any foreign object embedded in his glove.

== Undercard ==
Confirmed bouts:

| Preceded by vs. Frank Moran | Jess Willard's bouts 4 July 1919 | Succeeded by vs. Floyd Johnson |
| Preceded by vs. Tony Drake | Jack Dempsey's bouts 4 July 1919 | Succeeded by vs. Billy Miske |
