= Floyd Johnson =

American boxer (1900–1986)

Personal information
- Nickname: "The Auburn Bulldog"
- Nationality: American
- Born: July 23, 1900 Des Moines, Iowa, U.S.
- Died: June 1, 1986 (aged 85)
- Height: 6 ft 1 in (1.85 m)
- Weight: Heavyweight

Boxing career

Boxing record
- Total fights: 63 (Includes Newspaper Decisions)
- Wins: 39
- Win by KO: 27
- Losses: 13
- Draws: 11

Floyd Johnson (July 23, 1900 – June 1, 1986), nicknamed "The Auburn Bulldog", was an American heavyweight boxer who was known for his stiff punch. His (incomplete) boxing record comes out to: 38 wins (27 by knockout), 13 losses, and 11 draws. In 1923, he was considered a leading contender, and described in Time magazine as "possibly the fifth-best heavyweight in the ring." His manager was Alec Greggains. After his boxing career ended, he went into promotion in White Center, Washington. and served as a deputy sheriff in King County, Washington, in the mid-1920s.

== Early life and amateur career ==
Born July 23, 1900, in Des Moines, Iowa, Johnson was partly of Scandinavian stock, a handsome, light complected, blonde, blue-eyed young man. At eighteen, he briefly attempted a career as an iron worker which ended after a dispute with a co-worker. Early in his boxing career, at least by 1921, he traveled to San Francisco where he could box away from the distractions of home and the objections of his parents. In one of his first amateur bouts, he won the Amateur Championship of the Pacific Coast by knocking out Sydney Chermis in one round. In what may have been his first amateur victory he knocked out Jack Morris in one round, and was awarded a diamond studded belt buckle which he wore for decades.

== Boxing career highlights ==
On February 17, 1922, some sources report that Johnson fought an exhibition with the great black former heavyweight champion Jack Johnson in Milwaukie, Oregon.

In their first meeting on January 26, 1922, Johnson lost to Jack McCauliffe II, in a six-round points decision at the Auditorium in Tacoma, Washington. McCauliffe was a Michigan heavyweight who fought a few great heavyweights in his career, including Battling Levinsky and Primo Carnera. On July 12, 1923, Johnson defeated McCauliffe in a first-round knockout at Boyle's Thirty Acres in Jersey City, New Jersey. Joe Jeanette, the famed black heavyweight acted as referee, and counted out McCauliffe.

On October 6, 1922, he defeated "Fighting" Bob Martin in a tenth-round technical knockout at Madison Square Garden. Johnson had a lead as early as the first round, had Martin dazed by the end of the third, and was indisputably in command by the fifth. Thirty seconds into the tenth round, Martin's seconds threw a towel into the ring to stop the fight. Martin was a talented boxer who was an American Expeditionary Forces boxing champion from the WWI era as well as a 1920 Ohio State Heavyweight Champion.

On December 22, 1922, he defeated "Italian" Jack Herman in the third round at the Arena in Syracuse, New York. The telling blow was a right to the chin of Johnson, who had far from a stellar boxing record, and was described by one publication as a "fifth rater". Herman's face was badly beaten in the bout, and the referee considered stopping the fight earlier.

=== Win over Bill Brennan, January 1923 ===
On January 12, 1923, he decisively defeated talented heavyweight "K.O." Bill Brennan of Manhattan in a fifteen-round points decision at Madison Square Garden. Johnson was described as being the aggressor and both out fighting and outboxing Brennan throughout the bout. In the second round at least, Johnson had some problems and Brennan found his mark on several occasions. Brennan, who was a ring weary twenty-nine at the time of the bout, to Johnson's twenty-three was in serious distress in the twelfth and fifteenth rounds. In the twelfth, Johnson dished out a series of lefts and rights to the head of Brennan. In the fifteenth, Brennan took a number of additional blows to the head which forced him to clinch at times. The win targeted Johnson as a serious contender for Dempsey's title. Johnson was said to have exhibited exceptional boxing prowess and form in his win over Brennan. Brennan was so overwhelmed with the attack of Johnson, he was unable to wage an effective offensive against his opponent.

=== Difficult win over a larger Fred Fulton, April 1923 ===
On April 23, 1923, Johnson defeated Fred Fulton in a twelve-round newspaper decision at the Arena in Jersey City, New Jersey, and yet he took a bad beating and was close to being knocked out in the last round. According to the Los Angeles Times, Fulton had a nearly "insurmountable advantage" in weight in the bout, and Johnson had to be the aggressor throughout to win the newspaper decision. Johnson "pummeled" Fulton at will to keep him at bay, but took considerable punishment from Fulton's far less frequent but stronger blows. He may have been mismatched against an opponent who outweighed him by twenty pounds and had a three-inch advantage in height, as well as a reach advantage. In the final round, Fulton came "within an inch" of knocking out Johnson who had a decided disadvantage in the round. Johnson was given ten rounds by his ceaseless rushing and hammering, but clearly lost the eighth and twelfth rounds. In the eighth, Fulton hurt Johnson with lefts and rights to the jaw. A few boxing critics felt that Johnson's poor showing against Fulton should have prevented his manager subsequently matching him with the much larger, heavier, and stronger Jess Willard. When Johnson did connect in the later rounds, his blows were considered by several newspapermen to be less telling than Fulton's. Some boxing critics blamed Johnson's manager Charley Cook for matching him with larger, stronger opponents too early in his career. Cook said that he matched Johnson with Fulton specifically to prepare him for the heavier, and taller Willard, but Johnson fared poorly enough against both opponents that he may indeed have been mismatched. In his bout with Fulton, he was only twenty-two at the time of the fight to Fulton's thirty-one.

=== Loss to former heavyweight champion Jess Willard before huge audience, May 1923 ===
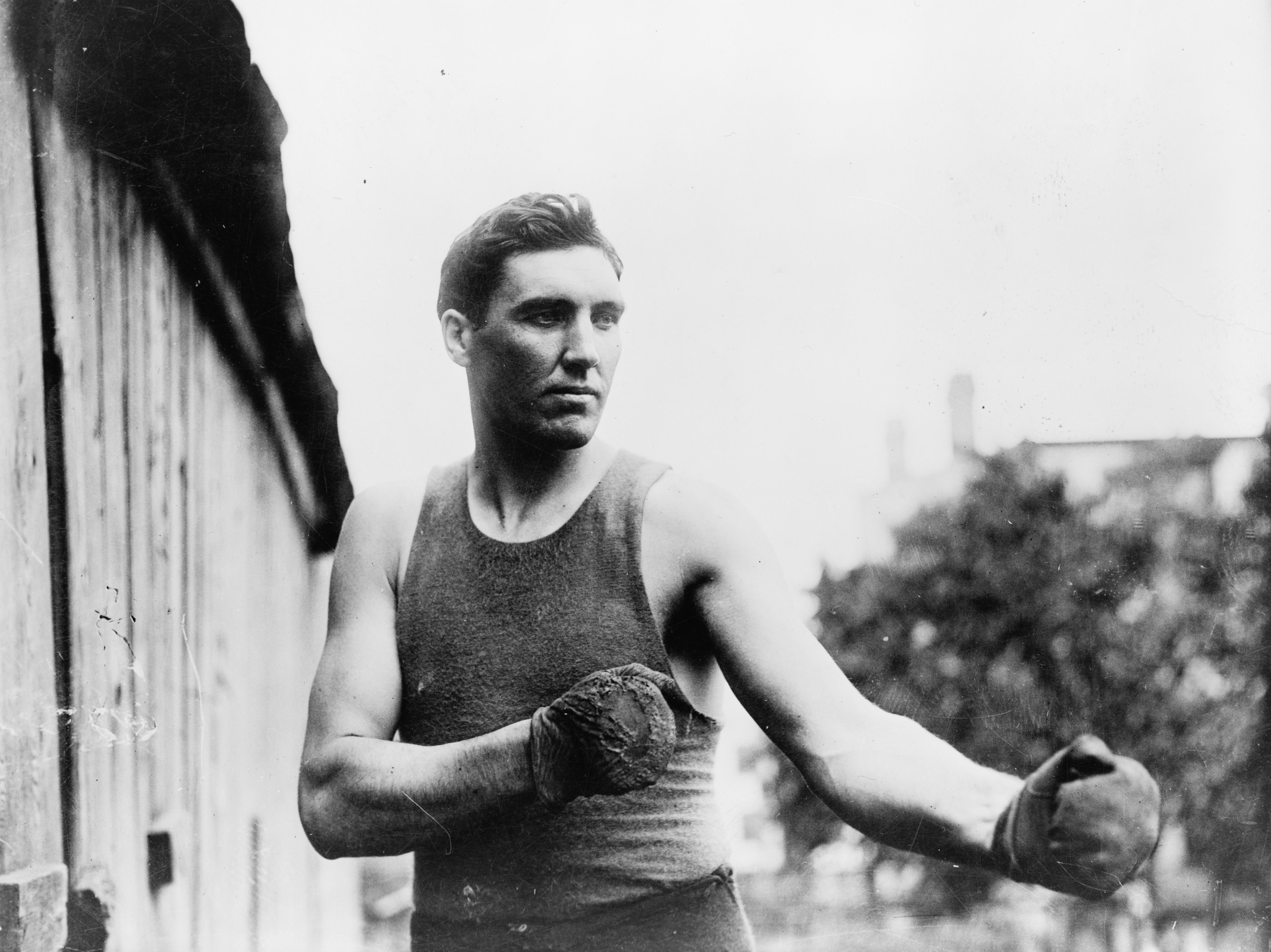
Ex-champion Jess Willard

On May 12, 1923, Johnson lost to Jess Willard in an eleventh-round TKO before a crowd of around 63,000 at Yankee Stadium in the Bronx. The bout was an impressive comeback for Willard who had not fought since his loss of the Heavyweight title to Jack Dempsey on July 4, 1919, in a brutal third-round technical knockout in Toledo, Ohio. Willard was amazingly twenty three years older than Johnson's youthful twenty-two years, but had nearly a fifty-pound weight advantage as well as an advantage in reach and height. The first five rounds seemed even, and though Johnson pressed his attack in the sixth and seventh, he slipped to the floor in the eighth and had continued trouble in the remaining rounds. One boxing writer felt that Johnson should not have been matched with a boxer as strong as Willard and so much heavier, as the loss ruined his chances of coming through the ranks as a contender and the beating he took was formidable.

He defeated Willie Meehan in a fourth round points decision on September 26, 1923, before a capacity crowd of 8,000 at the Auditorium in Oakland, California. California law at the time prohibited fights of more than four rounds. Meehan was down in the first from a hard left and again in the fourth round from another left, though Johnson was unable to score a knockout. He had previously defeated Meehan on January 31, 1922, in a four-round points decision in Seattle's Pavilion. He would later make Washington state his home.

=== Loss to Jack Renault, November 1923 ===
On November 2, 1923, Johnson lost somewhat badly to Jack Renault in a fifteen-round knockout at Madison Square Garden. Both boxers fought at a comparable weight of 196. According to Henry R. Farrell of the British United Press service, Renault put down Johnson three times in the last round. In the final knockdown, it took doctors ten minutes to revive Johnson. The defeat took away Johnson's few remaining hopes of challenging Jack Dempsey for the World Heavyweight Title, as most considered Renault a good boxer, but a second rate contender. Johnson had gone down twice in the final round when his seconds threw a towel into the ring to end the fight. Johnson had weathered great punishment in the first seven rounds, and was on the verge of a knockout in both the ninth and tenth rounds, though he continued to weather the punishment and even showed some offensive moves in the eleventh, twelfth and thirteenth. Renault had taken the Canadian Heavyweight Title in October 1923.

On May 9, 1924, he knocked out Chilean boxer Quinton Romero-Rojas before a crowd of 8,627 in the seventh round at New York's Madison Square Garden. Though his record was far from stellar, Romero-Rojas boxed several quality opponents in his career including Jack Sharkey, Harry Greb, and Jack Renault. Rojas was floored and counted out in the seventh by a sweeping right to the neck. Johnson knocked Romero-Rojas down a total of four times, but the fight was close in many regards, and at the end of the fifth Johnson was so fatigued and groggy that he walked to his opponents corner and sat down. Johnson was down on the mat once himself. The fourth and fifth rounds, when Romero-Rojas tried to pursue a knockout were particularly hard on Johnson.

On June 23, 1924, he lost to heavyweight boxer Jack Sharkey in a ten-round points decision at the Mechanics Building in Boston. Johnson was down for a short count in the second round and was rocked by hard rights to the jaw in the fourth. One newspaper gave Sharkey nine of the ten rounds. Johnson later said of Sharkey that "the right-handed punch which knocked me to the canvas was one of the hardest blows I ever received."

On May 18, 1925, he lost a 15-round points decision of the New Orleans Times-Picayune in a bout with Martin Burke at the Colliseum Arena in New Orleans, Louisiana. Burke had boxed many of the better middle and heavyweights of the era including Gene Tunney, Jack Dempsey, Harry Greb and Tommy Loughran. At 203, Johnson outweighed his opponent by twenty-eight pounds, but more telling may have been the recent difficult losses he had sustained in the ring. Burke acted as a training partner for Jack Dempsey during his career.

He pulled out a win against the great Black boxer Kid Norfolk, originally William Ward, on June 17, 1925, in a fourth round disqualification at the Auditorium in Oakland, California. Norfolk was a 1921 World Colored Light Heavyweight Champion and had claimed titles in Panama as well. Norfolk was barred from appearing in a California boxing ring for thirty days by the boxing commissioner following the foul against Johnson.

On October 26, 1925, he fell to a first-round technical knockout against accomplished Black heavyweight boxer Harry Wills in Newark, New Jersey. Wills held the World Colored Heavyweight Championship three times in his career.

On July 18, 1931, Johnson fought a four-round exhibition bout with the great Black ex-heavyweight world champion Jack Johnson in Seattle, Washington. Johnson's last known professional bout was a six-round loss on points against Cyclone Thompson on November 26, 1931, in White Center, Washington.

== Movie career ==
He had a cameo in the 1925 MGM film Way of a Girl, and a publicity photo for the film featured actress Eleanor Boardman pretending to photograph Johnson. Johnson appeared in a ring scene in the movie.

Johnson died on June 1, 1986.
