= Boyle's Thirty Acres =

Arena in New Jersey, United States

Coordinates: 40.7208°N 74.0608°W

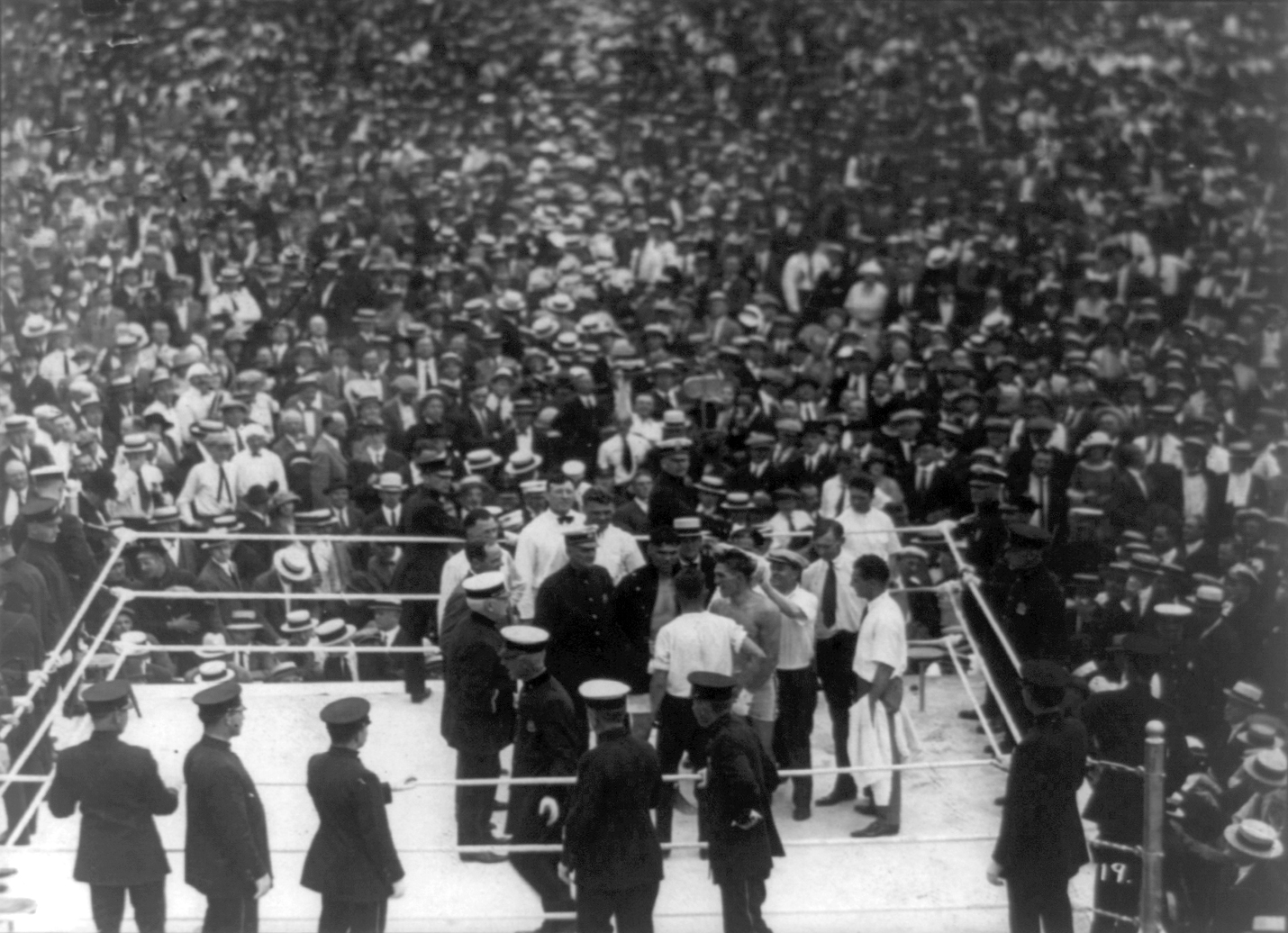
Jack Dempsey and Georges Carpentier in the ring before the fight

Boyle's Thirty Acres was a large wooden bowl arena in Jersey City, New Jersey. It was built specifically for the world heavyweight championship bout between Jack Dempsey of the United States and Georges Carpentier of France on July 2, 1921. It held approximately 80,000 fans and was built at a cost of $250,000. It was situated around Montgomery Street and Cornelison Avenue, on a plot of marshland owned by John F. Boyle.

== Background ==
Tex Rickard, the promoter of the bout, initially wanted the fight to take place at the Polo Grounds in New York City. However, Nathan Lewis Miller, the governor of New York, opposed prizefighting and indicated that he did not want a Dempsey-Carpentier bout to be held in New York State. After a number of offers from other promoters, Rickard settled on a proposal from Frank Hague, the mayor of Jersey City. Hague obtained a parcel of land owned by John P. Boyle, a paper box manufacturer. The site was once the home of the Jersey City baseball team. The actual size of Boyle's land was 34 acres (140,000 m^{2}). The octagonal structure was built using 2,250,000 feet (690,000 m) of lumber. The arena covered 300,000 square feet (28,000 m^{2}) and during construction had the services of 500 carpenters and 400 laborers. C.S. and J.W. Edwards were the contractors. Construction started on April 28, 1921 and was completed a few days before the fight. The arena was initially due to hold 50,000 fans. However, the demand for the international extravaganza was so enormous that Rickard had to expand the arena to hold a capacity of around 80,000 to 90,000 fans. It had the greatest seating capacity of any amphitheatre ever built. In the contest between Dempsey and Carpentier, the strength and power of Dempsey was too much for the Frenchman, who was knocked out in the fourth round, with a broken thumb.

== Other notable boxing cards ==
Boyle's Thirty Acres was used for a number of boxing cards after the Dempsey–Carpentier bout. On Labor Day, 1921, Rickard promoted a card headlined by four champions - Johnny Wilson, Panama Joe Gans Mike McTigue and Johnny Buff. On July 27, 1922, the lightweight champion Benny Leonard recorded a newspaper decision win over Lew Tendler. Luis Ángel Firpo earned a title shot at Dempsey by knocking out ex-champion Jess Willard in the eighth round before a paid attendance of 75,712 on July 12, 1923. Firpo had less luck in 1924 when he was defeated by Harry Wills before 70,000 fans. Other notable fighters to have fought in Boyle's Thirty Acres were Tiger Flowers, Paul Berlenbach, and James J Braddock aka the Cinderella Man.

== Demise ==
By 1927, most major title bouts in the New York area were being held either at Yankee Stadium or the Polo Grounds. After initially planning to replace the bowl with a more modern concrete arena, Rickard announced that the wooden arena would be demolished and in June 1927 the wrecking ball brought the short history of Boyle's Thirty Acres to an end.

== Site ==
By 1952, the site of Boyle's Thirty Acres had become a Jersey City housing project named Montgomery Gardens. After over 50 years of use, the project began to be emptied and the Jersey City Housing Authority planned to demolish the buildings in order to build mixed-use housing. Three of the six buildings were imploded in August 2015, and one was rehabilitated and converted to senior housing.
