= Luis Ángel Firpo =

Argentine boxer (1894–1960)

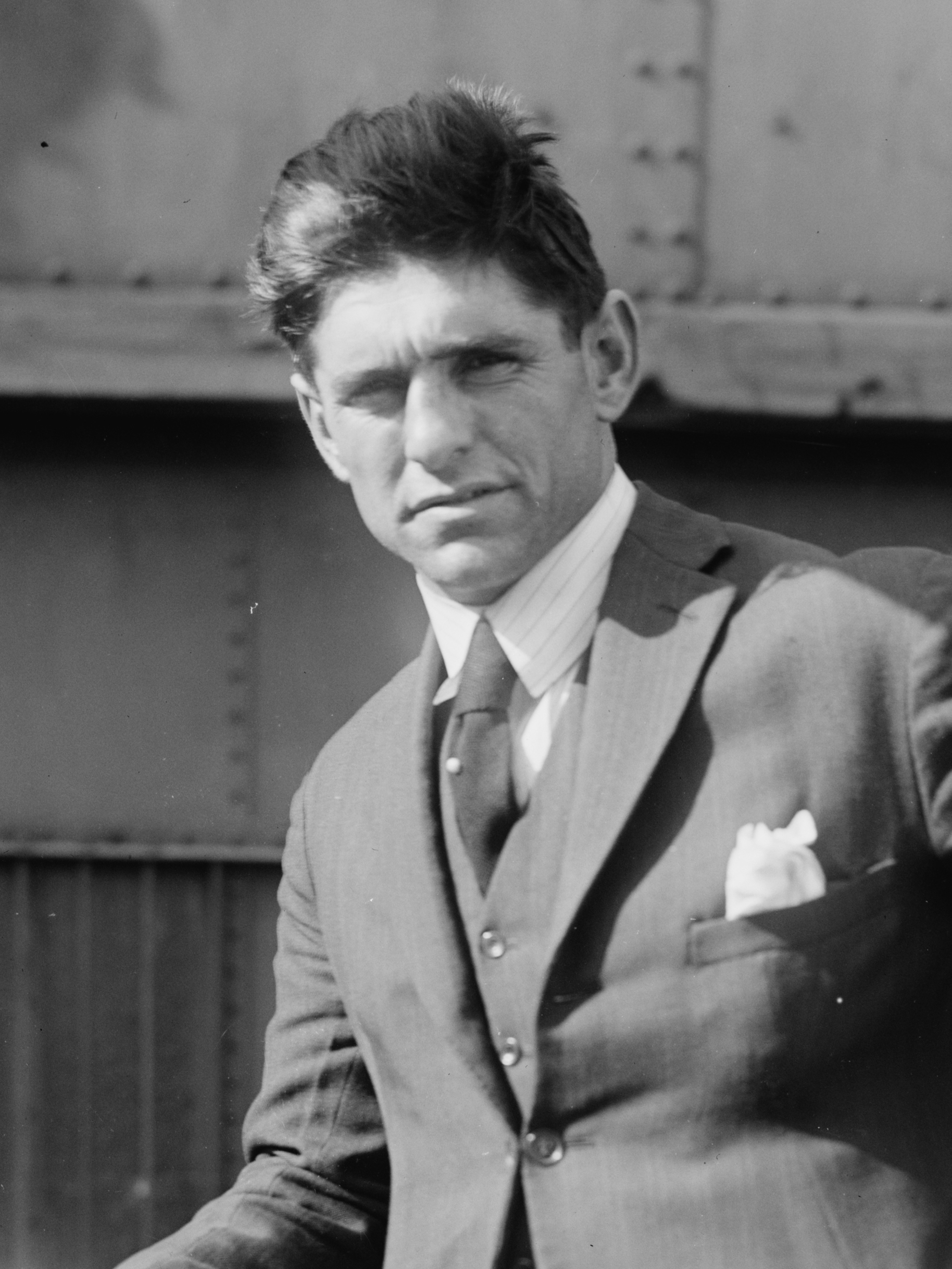
- Firpo in 1919

Personal information
- Nickname: El Toro Salvaje de las Pampas
- Born: 11 October 1894 Junín, Buenos Aires, Argentina
- Died: August 7, 1960 (aged 65)
- Height: 6 ft 2 1/2 in (1.89 m)

Boxing career
- Stance: Orthodox

Boxing record
- Total fights: 37
- Wins: 31
- Win by KO: 26
- Losses: 4
- Draws: 0
- No contests: 2

Luis Ángel Firpo (October 11, 1894 – August 7, 1960) was an Argentine boxer. Born in Junín, Argentina, he was nicknamed The Wild Bull of the Pampas. He was the first Latin American in history to challenge for the world heavyweight title. His bout against Jess Willard set a world record for boxing attendance at the time. His 1923 heavyweight title fight against Jack Dempsey was named Ring Magazine Fight of the Year for 1923.

Firpo was inducted into the International Boxing Hall of Fame in the Old Timer category as part of the class of 2024.

== Boxing career ==
In 1922 he arrived in the United States. He rose quickly in the Heavyweight rankings by winning all four of his fights that year by knockout. The first three in the United States made him a national hero in Argentina. He returned to his home town Buenos Aires to fight Jim Tracey in front of 20,000 spectators. Firpo won by knockout in the 4th round.

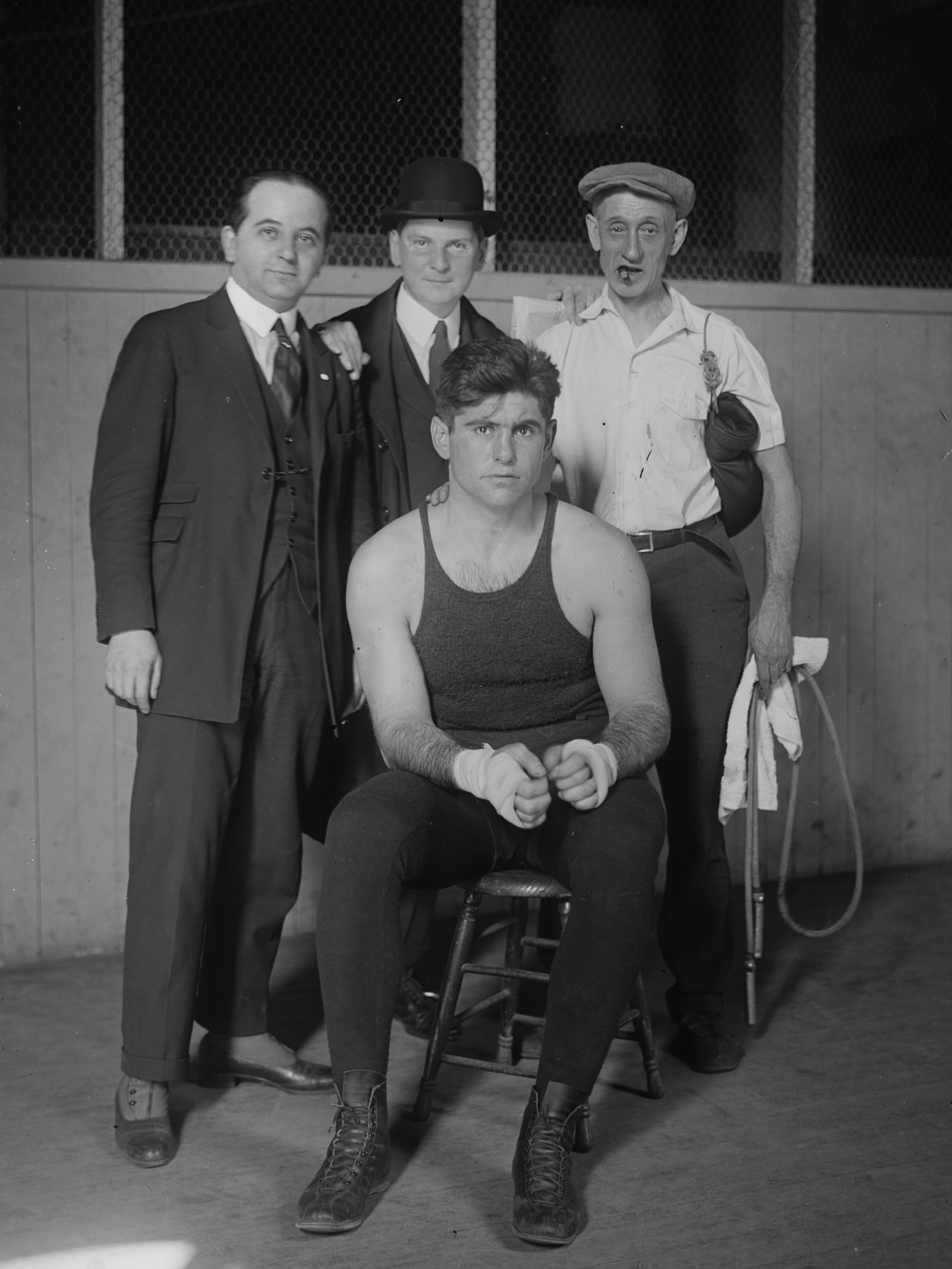
Firpo and his handlers

Firpo began 1923 at Madison Square Garden knocking out former title challenger Bill Brennan in the 12th round with a right. Brennan had to be taken to the hospital afterwards for a concussion. "Dempsey never hit me any harder than this fellow," said Brennan. Adding that he couldn't wear his old hat because his head was too swollen.

He followed that with seven more wins in a row, including a win over former world champion Jess Willard. Willard was 41 at the time, and his age forced the bout to be moved from New York to New Jersey. The event drew enormous interest, as 100,000 fight fans crowded the event with an estimated 25,000 more turned away, an attendance which set a world record for boxing at the time. After a win against Charley Weinert, Luis Firpo was scheduled for a heavyweight title shot against Jack Dempsey.

Firpo was the first Latin American in history to challenge for the world heavyweight title. In anticipation for the Dempsey-Firpo bout, a Firpo sparring session drew a crowd of 12,000. The match was at the Polo Grounds, normal capacity 55,000, but an additional 20,000 seats were constructed bringing the total to 75,000 for the fight, later expanded to 83,000. The police estimated that 150,000 people showed up, including a mass extending a quarter mile in every direction around the arena.

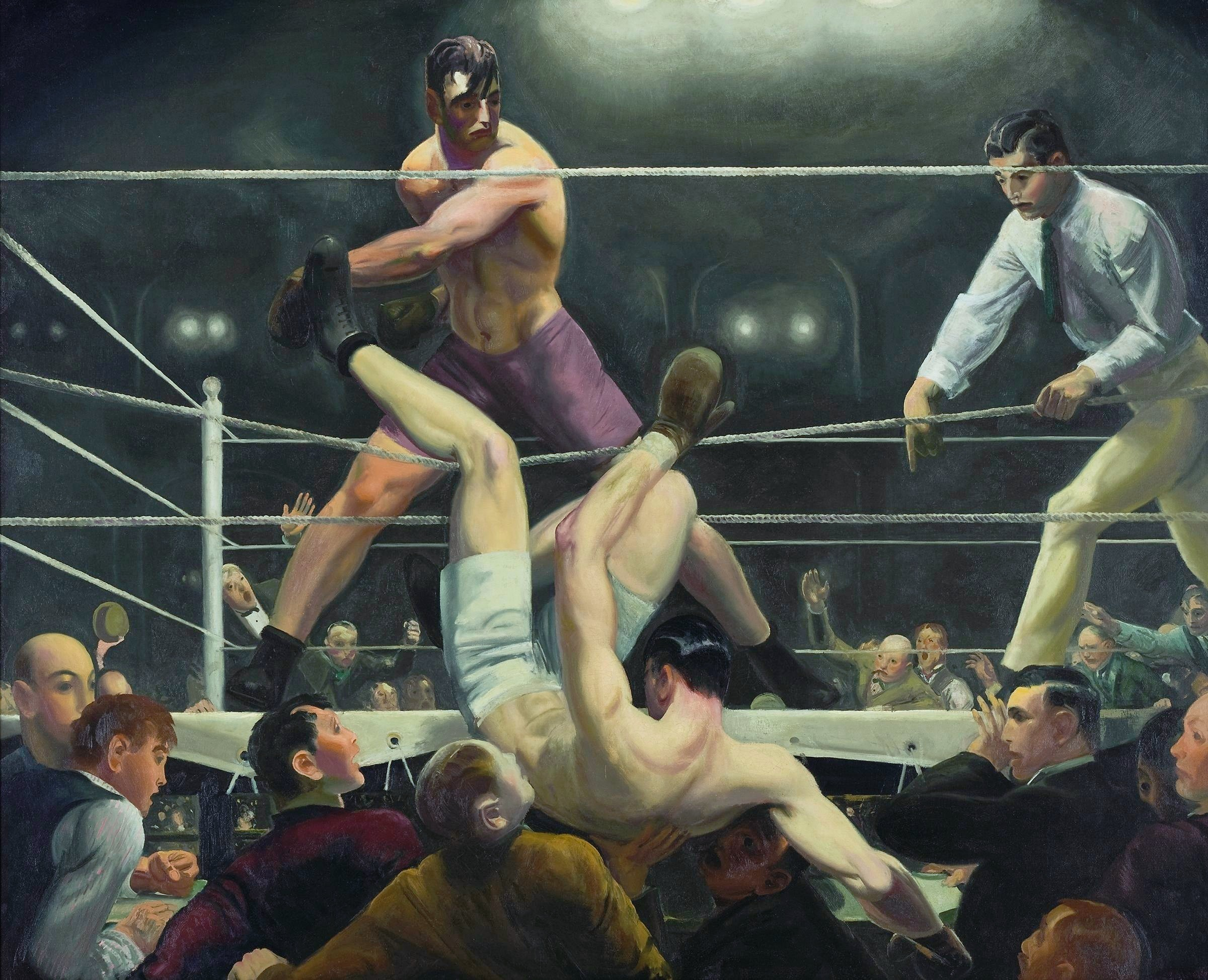
Firpo sending Dempsey outside the ring; Dempsey and Firpo, 1923 painting by George Bellows

Firpo was floored seven times in the first round of the bout, before he trapped Dempsey against the ropes and launched a combination that sent the champion out of the ring. Dempsey was helped into the ring at the count of nine (in spite of having been seventeen seconds outside the ring; fighters are given a twenty-second count when they are knocked through the ropes). After getting back in the ring Dempsey took 13 consecutive shots from Firpo. In the second round Dempsey rallied and knocked out Firpo. It was named Ring Magazine Fight of the Year for 1923.

He returned to Argentina for a period, fighting only 3 official bouts while he planned another return to the United States. Originally planned as a 10-match tour. 80,000 attended his fight against Harry Wills, however, he was defeated. He followed that with a loss against Charley Weinert, who Firpo had previously beaten. Both were by newspaper decision.

== Retirement ==
Afterwards, Firpo became a car-dealer for Stutz and a rancher. By 1940 he was ranching on a large scale in Carlos Casares with 8,000 cattle, 4,000 sheep and 400 horses. He discovered the boxer Abel Cestac in July 1940. Firpo and Jack Dempsey agreed to jointly manage Cestac, who went on to become the South American heavyweight champion. On his passing in 1960, Luis Firpo was buried in La Recoleta Cemetery in Buenos Aires. His mausoleum has a statue of him at the front.

== Legacy ==
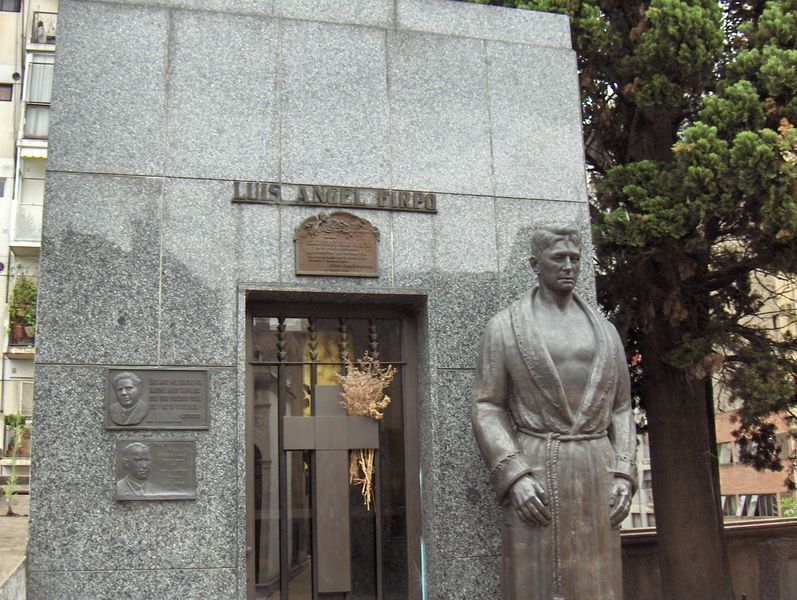
Luis Angel Firpo vault in the Cemetery of Recoleta, Buenos Aires, where his remains were interred

Firpo's popularity around Latin America was immeasurable. Years later, C.D. Luis Ángel Firpo, a professional football team in El Salvador was named after him. In addition, various schools, streets, and avenues across Latin America have been named after him.

The painting Dempsey and Firpo by George Bellows has appeared in many films including Goodfellas, and television including The Simpsons with Homer Simpson in the place of Firpo. With some calling it "the most influential sports painting ever."

The 1960 New Zealand play, The End of the Golden Weather by Bruce Mason has a main character, a would-be Olympic runner, who calls himself Firpo out of admiration for the boxer.

In 2003, he was named by The Ring as one of the 100 greatest punchers of all time.

== Professional boxing record ==
31 Wins (26 Knockouts), 4 Defeats, 2 No Contests
Res.	Record	Opponent	Type	Rd., Time	Date	Location	Notes
Loss	31-4; 2 NC, 2 ND	(Chile) Arturo Godoy	RTD	3 (12)	1936-07-11	(Argentina) Luna Park, Buenos Aires	
Win	31-3; 2 NC, 2 ND	(Czechoslovakia) Siska Habarta	KO	3 (10)	1936-05-25	(Argentina) Buenos Aires	
Win	30-3; 2 NC, 2 ND	(Italy) Saverio Grizzo	KO	1 (10)	1936-05-09	(Argentina) Luna Park, Buenos Aires	
Win	29-3; 2 NC, 2 ND	(Italy) Erminio Spalla	PTS	12	1926-04-03	(Argentina) Parque Romano, Buenos Aires	
ND	28-3; 2 NC, 2 ND	(Austria) Charley Weinert	ND	12	1924-11-12	(United States) 113th Regiment Armory, Newark, New Jersey	
ND	28-3; 2 NC, 1 ND	(United States) Harry Wills	ND	12	1924-09-11	(United States) Boyle's Thirty Acres, Jersey City, New Jersey	
Win	28-3; 2 NC	(United States) Al Reich	KO	1 (10)	1924-04-05	(Argentina) Club Sportivo Barracas, Buenos Aires	
Win	27-3; 2 NC	(Italy) Erminio Spalla	TKO	14 (15)	1924-03-27	(Argentina) Buenos Aires	
Win	26-3; 2 NC	(United States) Farmer Lodge	KO	5 (10)	1924-02-24	(Argentina) Club Atlético River Plate, Buenos Aires	
Loss	25-3; 2 NC	(United States) Jack Dempsey	KO	2 (15)	1923-09-14	(United States) Polo Grounds, New York City, New York	For NYSAC World Heavyweight title.
Win	25-2; 2 NC	(Austria) Charley Weinert	TKO	2 (8)	1923-08-13	(United States) Shibe Park, Philadelphia, Pennsylvania	
Win	24-2; 2 NC	(United States) Homer Smith	PTS	10	1923-08-03	(United States) Omaha, Nebraska	
Win	23-2; 2 NC	(United States) Joe Burke	KO	2 (10)	1923-07-27	(United States) Battle Creek, Michigan	
Win	22-2; 2 NC	(United States) Jess Willard	KO	8 (12)	1923-07-12	(United States) Boyle's Thirty Acres, Jersey City, New Jersey	
Win	21-2; 2 NC	(United States) Jim Hibbard	KO	2 (20)	1923-06-17	El Toreo, Mexico City	
Win	20-2; 2 NC	(United States) Jack Herman	KO	2 (10)	1923-06-10	(Cuba) Havana	
Win	19-2; 2 NC	(United States) Jack McAuliffe II	KO	3 (15)	1923-05-12	(United States) Yankee Stadium, The Bronx, New York	
Win	18-2; 2 NC	(United States) Bill Brennan	KO	12 (15)	1923-03-12	(United States) Madison Square Garden, New York City, New York	
Win	17-2; 2 NC	(Australia) Jim Tracey	KO	4 (10)	1922-10-08	(Argentina) Club Sportivo Barracas, Buenos Aires	
Win	16-2; 2 NC	(United States) Jack Herman	TKO	5 (12)	1922-05-13	(United States) Ebbets Field, Brooklyn, New York	
Win	15-2; 2 NC	(United States) Joe McCann	KO	5 (12)	1922-04-04	(United States) Newark, New Jersey	
Win	14-2; 2 NC	(United States) Tom Maxted	KO	7 (12)	1922-03-20	(United States) Newark, New Jersey	
Win	13-2; 2 NC	(Uruguay) Fernando Priano	KO	2 (10)	1921-09-27	(Argentina) San Miguel de Tucumán, Tucumán	
Win	12-2; 2 NC	(United States) Gunboat Smith	KO	12 (15)	1921-04-23	(Argentina) Club Universitario, Buenos Aires	
Win	11-2; 2 NC	(United States) Gunboat Smith	PTS	12	1921-03-12	(Chile) Valparaíso, Valparaíso	
Win	10-2; 2 NC	(United States) Dave Mills	KO	1 (15)	1920-12-11	(Argentina) Club Universitario, Buenos Aires	Defended South American; Heavyweight title.
NC	9-2; 2 NC	(Chile) Alberto Coleman	NC	10	1920-09-11	(Argentina) Teatro Municipal, Mendoza, Mendoza	
Win	9-2; 1 NC	(Argentina) Antonio Jirsa	KO	1 (10)	1920-07-07	(Argentina) Club Universitario, Buenos Aires	
Win	8-2; 1 NC	(United States) Dave Mills	KO	1 (15)	1920-04-30	(Chile) Estadio Hippodrome, Santiago, Santiago	Won South American Heavyweight title.
Win	7-2; 1 NC	(Spain) Andrés Balsa	KO	6 (10)	1920-02-28	(Chile) Valparaíso, Valparaíso	
Loss	6-2; 1 NC	(United States) Dave Mills	PTS	15	1919-11-01	(Chile) Santiago, Santiago	For South American Heavyweight title.
Win	6-1; 1 NC	(United States) Arthur Manning	KO	3 (10)	1919-04-26	(Uruguay) Montevideo, Montevideo	
Win	5-1; 1 NC	(Uruguay) Fernando Priano	KO	4 (10)	1919-04-12	(Uruguay) Montevideo, Montevideo	
Win	4-1; 1 NC	(United States) Calvin Respress	PTS	15	1919-02-07	(Chile) Santiago, Santiago	
Win	3-1; 1 NC	(United States) Calvin Respress	DQ	2 (10)	1918-12-14	(Chile) Santiago, Santiago	
Win	2-1; 1 NC	(Chile) Ignacio Sepulveda	KO	2 (10)	1918-11-09	(Chile) Santiago, Santiago	
Win	1-1; 1 NC	(Chile) William Daly	KO	7 (10)	1918-09-28	(Chile) Chillán, Biobío	
Loss	0-1; 1 NC	(Uruguay) Angel Rodriguez	KO	1 (10)	1918-01-12	(Uruguay) Teatro Casino, Montevideo, Montevideo	
NC	1 NC	(Australia) Frank Hagney	NC	6 (10)	1917-12-10	(Argentina) Internacional Boxing Club, Buenos Aires	

== See also ==
- Jack Dempsey vs. Luis Ángel Firpo
- C.D. Luis Ángel Firpo -Football (soccer) team
- List of Argentines
- John Ruiz - First Hispanic world heavyweight champion
- Andy Ruiz - Second Hispanic world Heavyweight champion
