= Jess Willard =

American boxer (1881–1968)

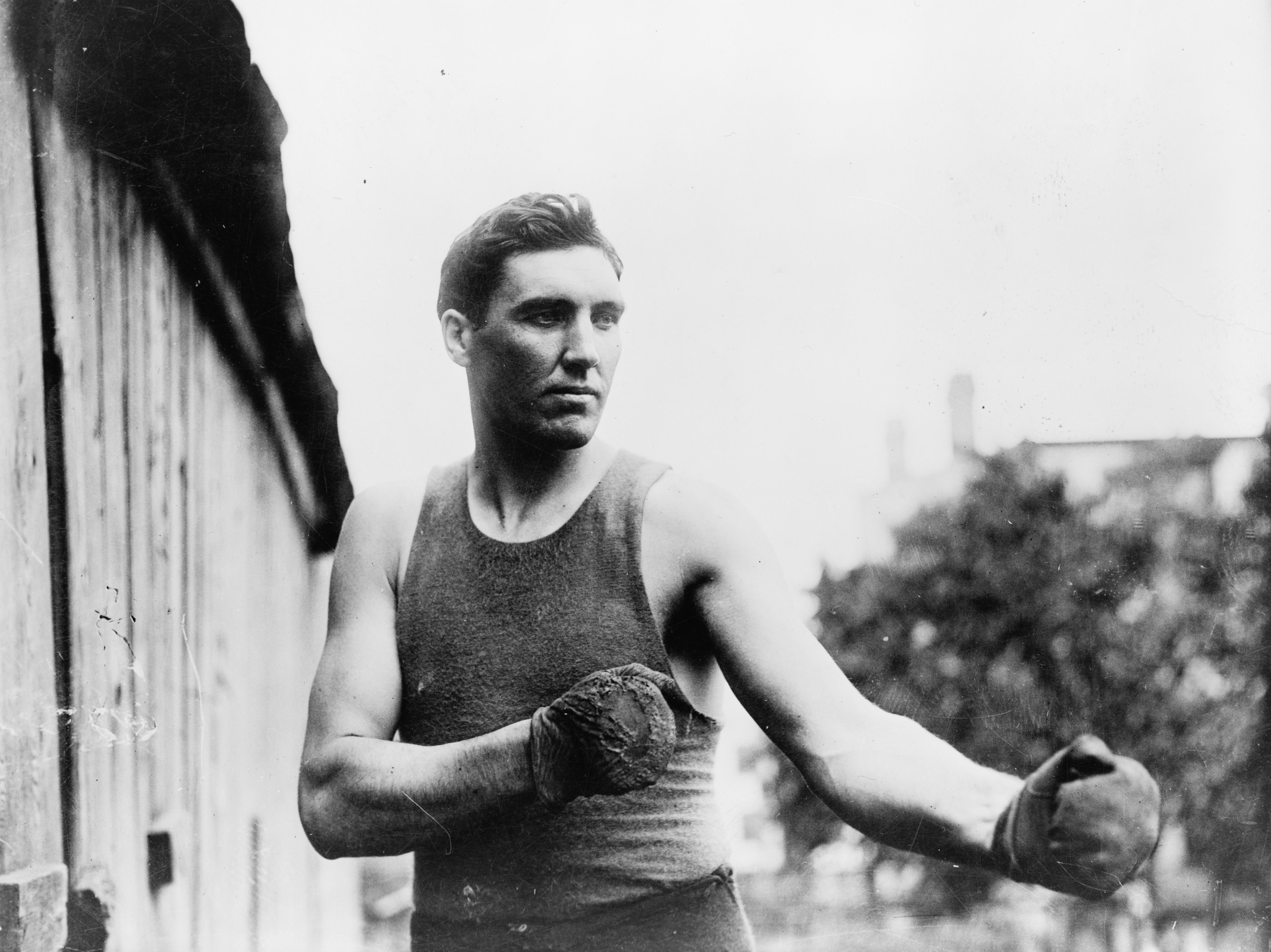
- Willard in 1915

Personal information
- Nicknames: Great White Hope; Pottawatomie Giant
- Born: Jess Myron Willard; December 29, 1881 Saint Clere, Kansas, US
- Died: December 15, 1968 (aged 86) Los Angeles, California, US
- Height: 6 ft 6 1/2 in (199 cm)
- Weight: Heavyweight

Boxing career
- Stance: Orthodox

Boxing record
- Total fights: 34
- Wins: 25
- Win by KO: 20
- Losses: 7
- Draws: 2

Jess Myron Willard (December 29, 1881 – December 15, 1968) was an American world heavyweight boxing champion billed as the Pottawatomie Giant. He won the world heavyweight title in 1915 by knocking out Jack Johnson.

Willard was known for size rather than skill, and though he held the championship for more than four years, he rarely defended it. In 1919, when he was 37 years old, he lost the title in an extremely one-sided loss by declining to come out for the fourth round against Jack Dempsey, who became a more celebrated champion. Soon after the bout, Willard began accusing Dempsey of using something with the effect of a knuckle duster. Dempsey did not grant Willard a return match, and at 42 years old he was KO'd, following which he retired from boxing, although for the rest of his life he continued to claim Dempsey had cheated. Ferdie Pacheco expressed the opinion in a book that the surviving photographs of Willard's face during the Dempsey fight indicate fractures to Willard's facial bones suggesting a metal implement, and show he was bleeding heavily. The matter has never been resolved, with contemporaneous ringside sports journalist reporting in The New York Times that Willard spat out at least one tooth and was "a fountain of blood" increasingly discounted in favor of a view that he had only a cut lip and a little bruising.

== Early life ==
Jess Myron Willard was born on 29 December 1881 in Saint Clere, Kansas. In his teenage years and twenties he worked as a cowboy. He was of mostly English ancestry, which had been in North America since the colonial era. The first member of the Willard family arrived in Virginia in the 1630s.

== Boxing career ==
A powerfully built 6 ft 6 1/2 in (1.99 m) and 245 lb (111 kg), Willard did not begin boxing until the age of 27, but proved successful, defeating top-ranked opponents to earn a chance to fight for the Championship. He said he started boxing because he did not have much of an education, but thought his size and strength could earn him a good living. He was a gentle and friendly person and did not enjoy boxing or hurting people, so often waited until his opponent attacked him before punching back, which made him feel at ease as if he were defending himself. He was often maligned as an uncoordinated oaf rather than a skilled boxer, but his counter-punching style, coupled with his enormous strength and stamina, proved successful against top fighters. His physical strength was so great that he was reputed to be able to kill a man with a single punch. In a fight with Jack "Bull" Young in 1913, during the ninth round Young collapsed and died from a punch to the head. Willard was charged with second-degree murder, but was successfully defended by lawyer Earl Rogers.

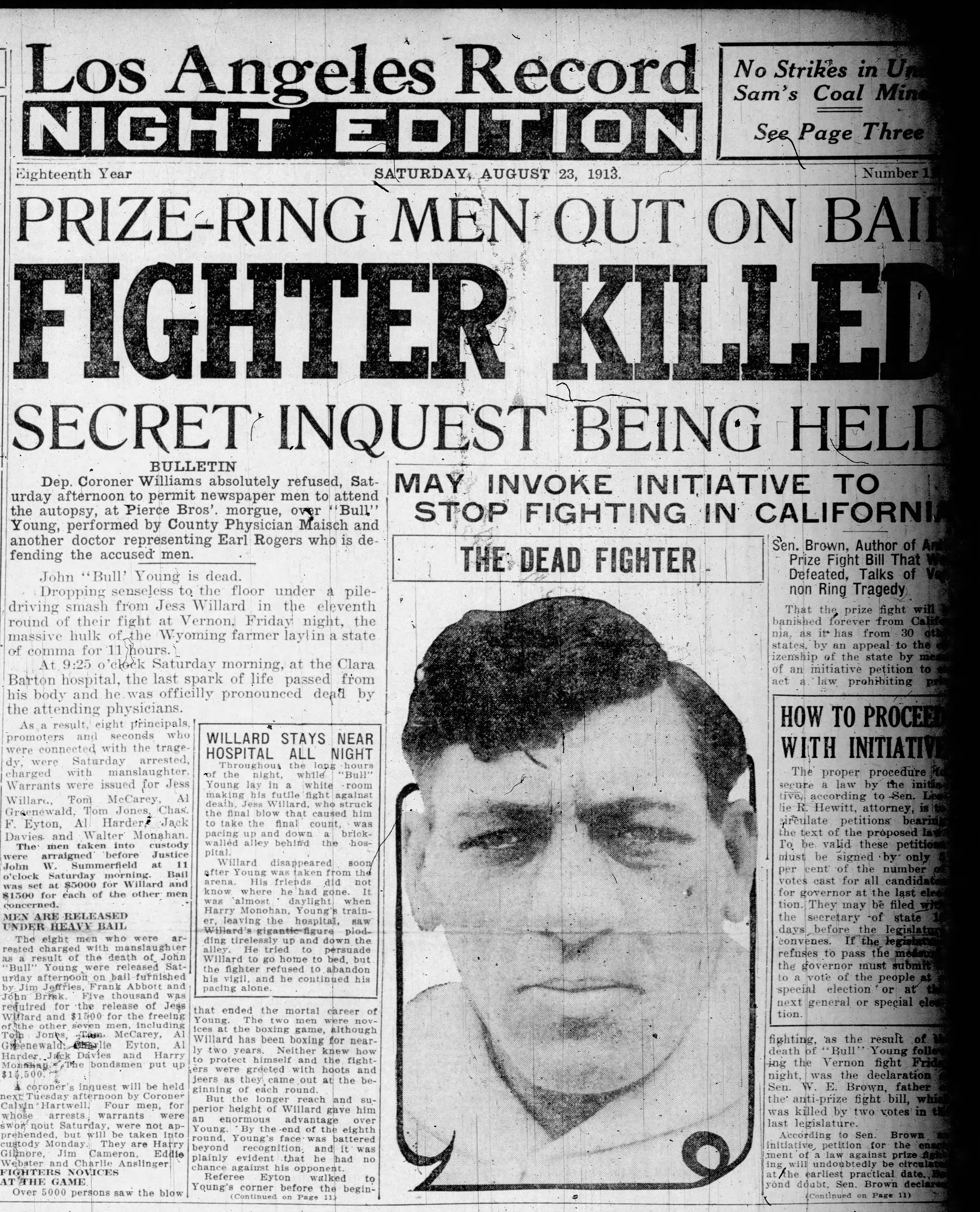
After Bull Young was killed by a blow from Jess Willard at Vernon Arena in 1913, in the 11th round of what was intended to be 20-round fight, California passed a law banning public boxing matches of longer than four rounds

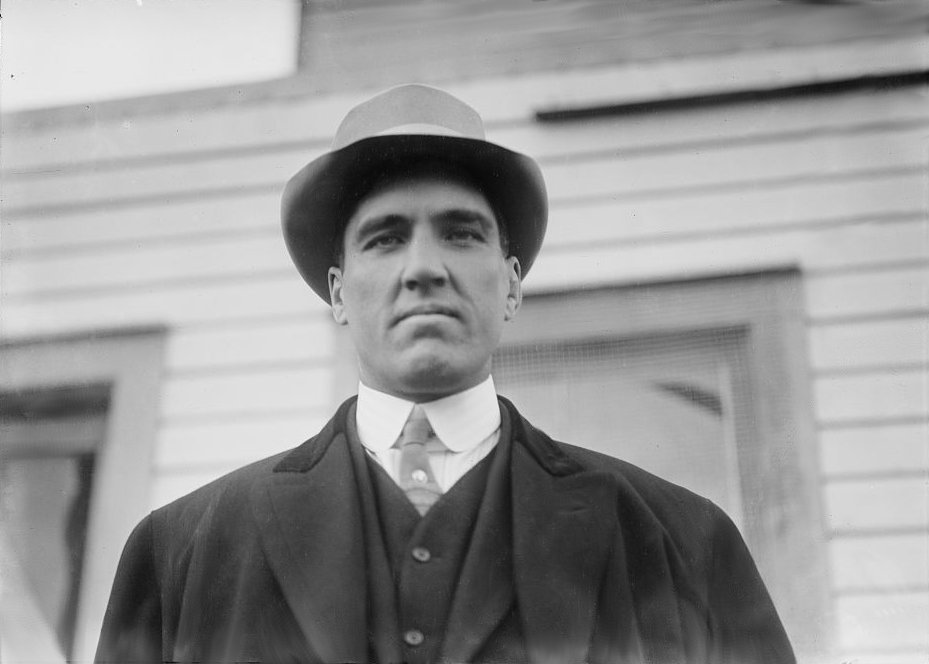
Willard in 1913

=== Jack Johnson fight ===
On April 5, 1915, in front of a huge crowd at the new Oriental Park Racetrack in Havana, Cuba, he knocked out champion Jack Johnson in the 26th round to win the world heavyweight boxing championship. Johnson later said he had intentionally lost the fight, despite the fact there is evidence of Willard winning fairly, which can be seen clearly in the recorded footage, as well as the comments Johnson made to his cornermen between rounds and immediately after the fight, and that he bet $2500 on himself to win. Willard said, "If he was going to throw the fight, I wish he'd done it sooner. It was hotter than hell out there." Johnson later acknowledged lying about throwing the fight after footage of the fight was made widely available in the United States. Shortly after the fight, Jack Johnson had actually accepted defeat gracefully saying, "Willard was too much for me, I just didn't have it."

Johnson found that he could not knock out the giant Willard, who fought as a counterpuncher, making Johnson do all the leading. Johnson began to tire after the 20th round, and was visibly hurt by heavy body punches from Willard in rounds preceding the 26th-round knockout. Johnson's claim of a "dive" gained momentum because most fans only saw a still photo of Johnson lying on the canvas shading his eyes from the broiling Cuban sun. No films of the fight were allowed to be shown in the United States because of an inter-state ban on the trafficking of fight films that was in effect at the time. Most boxing fans saw the film of the Johnson–Willard fight only when a copy was found in 1967.

Willard fought several times over the next four years, but made only one official title defense prior to 1919, defeating Frank Moran on March 25, 1916, at Madison Square Garden.

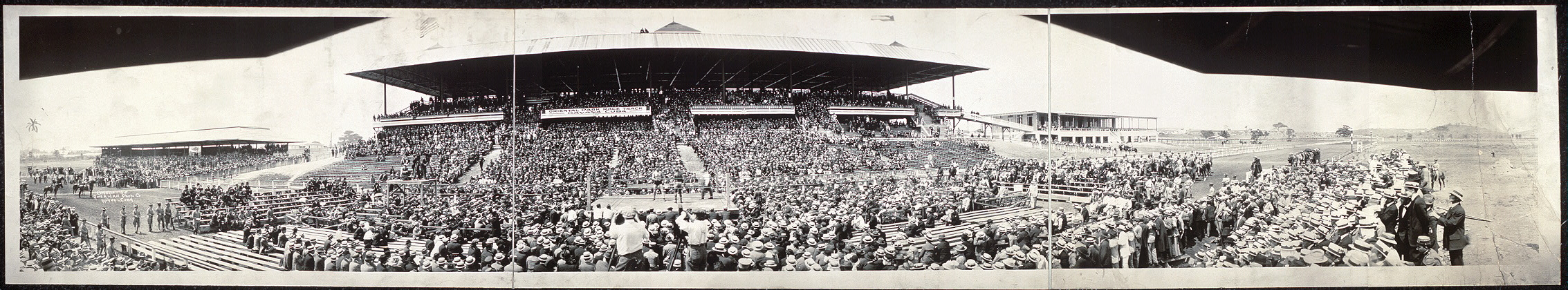
Panorama of Willard's title fight against Jack Johnson in Havana, Cuba, 1915

=== Jack Dempsey fight ===
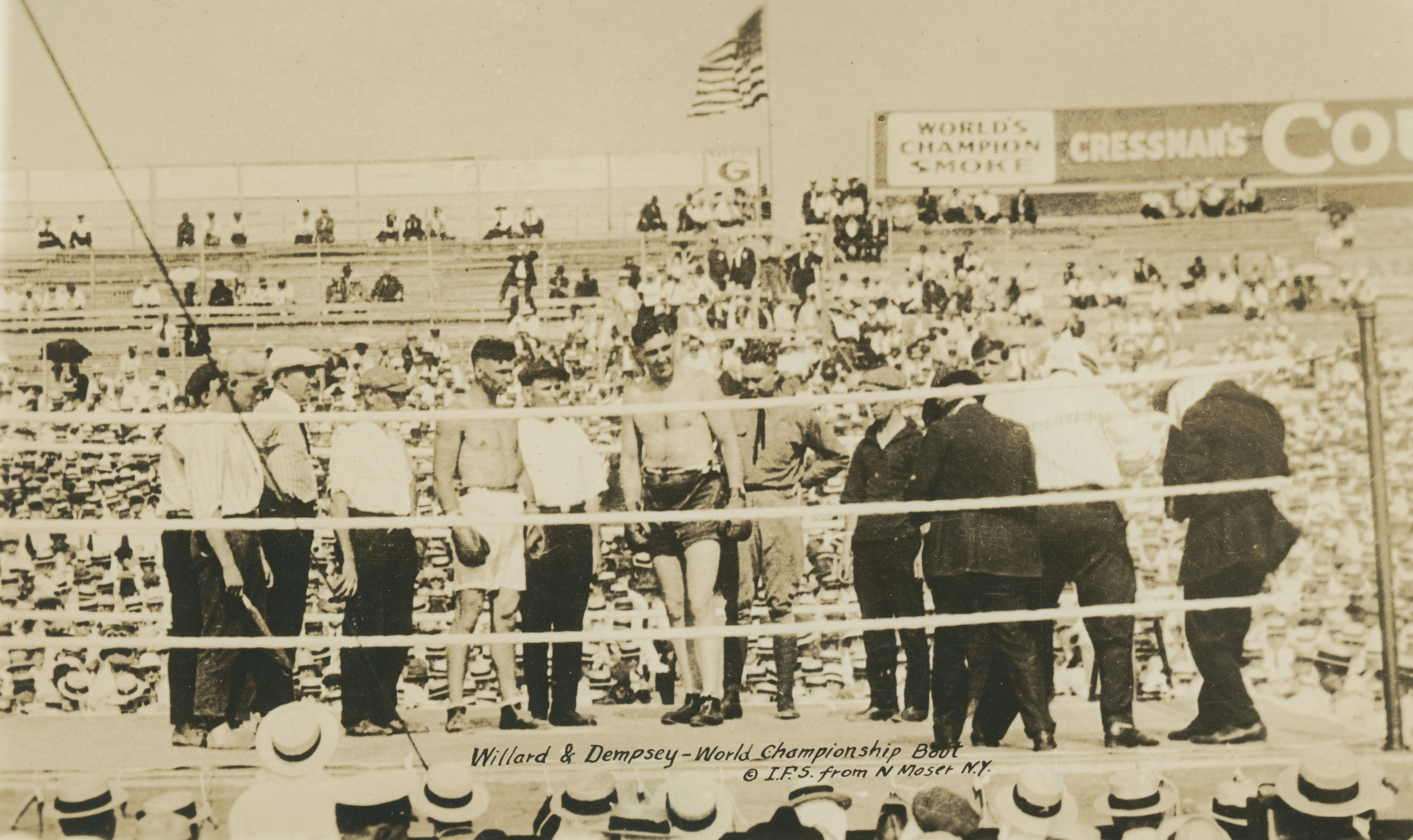
Willard and Dempsey before the world championship bout, 1919

At age 37, Willard lost his title to Dempsey on July 4, 1919, in Toledo. Dempsey knocked Willard down for the first time in his career with a left hook in the first round. Dempsey knocked Willard down seven times in the first round—although it should be remembered that rules at the time permitted standing almost over a knocked-down opponent and hitting him again as soon as both gloves had left the canvas. At one point Dempsey left the ring mistakenly thinking the fight was over, and under the rules could have been disqualified, but Willard had economised by not employing professional cornermen and they failed to insist on application of the regulations. Dempsey won the title when Willard was unable to continue after the third round. In the fight, Willard was later reputed to have suffered a broken jaw, cheekbone, and ribs, as well as losing several teeth. His attempt to fight to the finish, ending when he was unable to come out for the fourth round, is considered one of the most courageous performances in boxing history. However, the extent of Willard's injuries has been highly disputed and is now unclear since multiple independent reports only a few days after the fight said that there were no traces of any damage other than a couple of bruises:

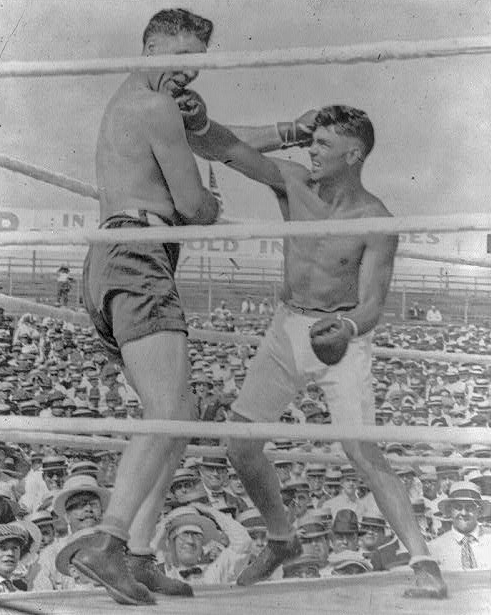
Willard (left) taking a punch to the chin from Jack Dempsey (right).

To take only one representative account, according to a reporter for the Topeka Daily Capital, July 16, 1919, p. 8, who interviewed Jess when he got back to Lawrence, "The ex-champion didn't have any black eye, nor any signs that he was injured in any way."

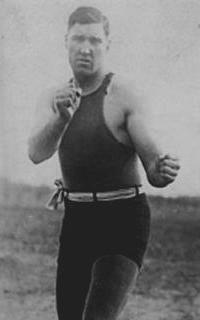
Jess Willard

Concealed metal object theory

When interviewed by Harry Carpenter of the BBC Sport in the 1960s at his house in California, Willard said to the reporter, "I'll show you, how I was beaten." He then drew a metal bolt from a cardbox, saying that Dempsey held the bolt in his hand, not within the glove but at the palm of it, attached to the thumb sideways, and used the bolt rather for cutting-and-slicing-like moves to inflict blood-spilling cuts and pain, relinquishing it just as the bout was stopped, and according to Willard, the bolt was found on the floor of the ring at the end of the fight and he kept it. Mike Tyson, who studied the case in-depth and very thoroughly, later joined Carpenter to discuss the subject. Tyson, a great admirer of Dempsey's, admitted that "he just did whatever Jack Kearns told him to do" and "in those days anything could have happened", for that there was no agency or other legal authority at the time that was officially empowered to oversee and protect fighters from violations of such kind. However, footage before the fight shows Dempsey putting on his gloves with no additional objects and in full view of Willard, his team and the crowd.

=== Comeback ===
After losing his title fight with Dempsey, Willard went into semiretirement from the ring, fighting only exhibition bouts for the next four years. On May 12, 1923, promoter Tex Rickard arranged for Willard to make a comeback, fighting Floyd Johnson as part of the first line-up of boxing matches at the newly opened Yankee Stadium in New York City. 63,000 spectators attended the match, which the 41-year-old Willard was widely expected to lose. However, after Willard took a beating for several rounds, he came back to knock down Johnson in the 9th and 11th rounds, and Willard earned a TKO victory. Damon Runyon wrote afterward: "Youth, take off your hat and bow low and respectfully to age. For days and days, the sole topic of conversation in the world of sport will be Willard's astonishing comeback."

Willard followed up this victory by facing contender Luis Ángel Firpo on July 12, 1923. The fight was held at Boyle's Thirty Acres in New Jersey, in front of more than 75,000 spectators. Willard was knocked out in the eighth round, and then permanently retired from boxing.

== Later life ==
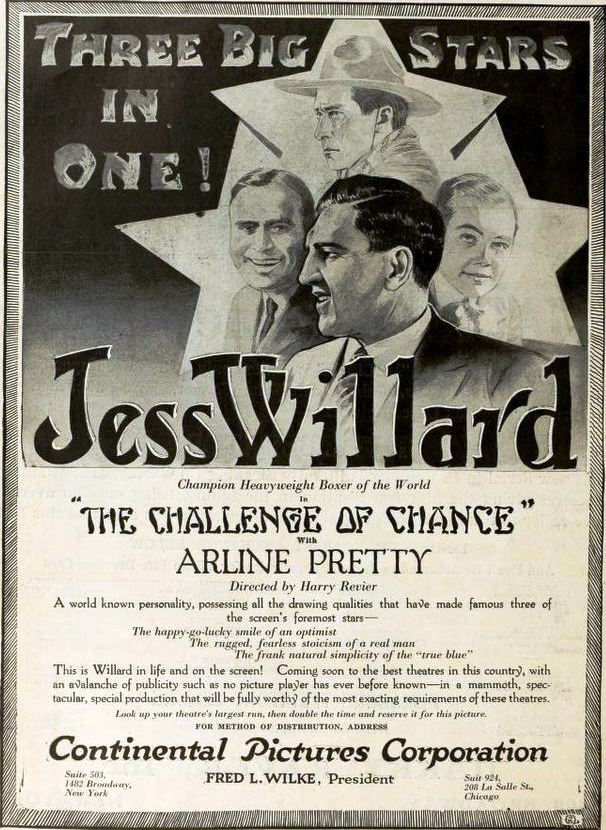
Advertisement for The Challenge of Chance (1919)

Willard parlayed his boxing fame into an acting career of a sort. He acted in a vaudeville show, had a role in Buffalo Bill's Wild West show, and starred in a 1919 feature film The Challenge of Chance. In 1933, he appeared in a bit part in a boxing movie, The Prizefighter and the Lady, with Max Baer and Myrna Loy.

== Death ==
Willard died on 15 December 1968, in Los Angeles, California, from congestive heart failure. He had been admitted to a hospital a week earlier for a heart condition, but left against a doctor's advice. He returned again after suffering a stroke and died 12 hours later.

Having died at age 86, Willard was the longest-lived heavyweight champion in history until he was surpassed by his old rival Jack Dempsey (who died in 1983, aged 87), then by Jack Sharkey (who died in 1994, aged 91), and finally by Max Schmeling (who died in 2005 at the age of 99).

Willard's body was buried at Forest Lawn, Hollywood Hills Cemetery, in Los Angeles.

== Tributes ==
In 2003 he was inducted posthumously into the International Boxing Hall of Fame.

== Cultural references ==
Willard and a dispute he had with Harry Houdini is the topic of Andy Duncan's Nebula Award nominated novella The Pottawatomie Giant. In 2020, a television program Antiques Roadshow – Crocker Art Museum (Season 24, Episode 8, Part 2), showed a photograph from his 5 April 1915 championship winning match, and the commemorative pocket watch Willard carried which was valued at between $15,000 and $50,000.

== Professional boxing record ==
=== Official record ===
34 fights	22 wins	5 losses
By knockout	20	3
By decision	2	1
By disqualification	0	1
Draws	1	
Newspaper decisions/draws	6	

All newspaper decisions are officially regarded as “no decision” bouts and are not counted in the win/loss/draw column.

No.	Result	Record	Opponent	Type	Round, time	Date	Location	Notes
34	Loss	22–5–1 (6)	Luis Angel Firpo	KO	8 (12), 1:55	12 Jul 1923	Boyle's Thirty Acres, Jersey City, New Jersey, U.S.	
33	Win	22–4–1 (6)	Floyd Johnson	TKO	11 (15)	12 May 1923	Yankee Stadium, Bronx, New York, U.S.	
32	Loss	21–4–1 (6)	Jack Dempsey	RTD	3 (12)	4 Jul 1919	Bay View Park Arena, Toledo, Ohio, U.S.	Lost world heavyweight title
31	Win	21–3–1 (6)	Frank Moran	NWS	10	25 Mar 1916	Madison Square Garden, New York City, New York, U.S.	NYSAC heavyweight title at stake; (via KO only)
30	Win	21–3–1 (5)	Jack Johnson	KO	26 (45), 1:26	5 Apr 1915	Oriental Park, Havana, Cuba	Won NYSAC heavyweight title
29	Win	20–3–1 (5)	George Rodel	KO	6 (10)	28 Apr 1914	Orpheum Theater, Atlanta, Georgia, U.S.	
28	Win	19–3–1 (5)	Dan Dailey	KO	9 (10)	13 Apr 1914	Broadway Auditorium, Buffalo, New York, U.S.	
27	Loss	18–3–1 (5)	Tom McMahon	NWS	12	27 Mar 1914	Grand Opera House, Youngstown, Ohio, U.S.	
26	Win	18–3–1 (4)	George Rodel	KO	9 (20)	29 Dec 1913	Casino, New Haven, Connecticut, U.S.	
25	Win	17–3–1 (4)	George Davis	KO	2 (10)	12 Dec 1913	Broadway Auditorium, Buffalo, New York, U.S.	
24	Win	16–3–1 (4)	Carl Morris	NWS	10	3 Dec 1913	Madison Square Garden, New York City, New York, U.S.	
23	Win	16–3–1 (3)	Jack Reed	TKO	2 (10)	24 Nov 1913	Princess Rink, Fort Wayne, Indiana, U.S.	
22	Loss	15–3–1 (3)	George Rodel	NWS	10	17 Nov 1913	Elite Rink, Milwaukee, Wisconsin, U.S.	
21	Win	15–3–1 (2)	Bull Young	KO	11 (20)	22 Aug 1913	Pacific A.C., Vernon, California, U.S.	Young died of injuries sustained from the fight.
20	Win	14–3–1 (2)	Al Williams	TKO	8 (10)	4 Jul 1913	Moana Springs Arena, Reno, Nevada, U.S.	
19	Draw	13–3–1 (2)	Charley Miller	PTS	4	27 Jun 1913	Dreamland Rink, San Francisco, California, U.S.	
18	Loss	13–3 (2)	Gunboat Smith	PTS	20	20 May 1913	Eighth Street Arena, San Francisco, California, U.S.	
17	Win	13–2 (2)	Jack Leon	KO	4 (10)	5 Mar 1913	Princess Rink, Fort Wayne, Indiana, U.S.	
16	Win	12–2 (2)	Frank Bauer	TKO	5 (10), 1:50	22 Jan 1913	Princess Rink, Fort Wayne, Indiana, U.S.	
15	Win	11–2 (2)	Soldier Kearns	KO	8 (10)	27 Dec 1912	Madison Square Garden, New York City, New York, U.S.	
14	Win	10–2 (2)	Sailor White	KO	1 (10)	2 Dec 1912	Miller's Hall, Buffalo, New York, U.S.	
13	Draw	9–2 (2)	Luther McCarty	NWS	10	19 Aug 1912	Madison Square Garden, New York City, New York, U.S.	
12	Win	9–2 (1)	Arthur Pelkey	NWS	10	29 Jul 1912	Madison Square Garden, New York City, New York, U.S.	
11	Win	9–2	Bull Young	KO	5	2 Jul 1912	South Chicago, Chicago, U.S.	
10	Win	8–2	Frank Bauer	TKO	3 (6)	29 May 1912	Irwin Hall, St. Charles, Missouri, U.S.	
9	Win	7–2	Bull Young	KO	6 (10)	22 May 1912	Princess Rink, Fort Wayne, Indiana, U.S.	
8	Loss	6–2	Joe Cox	TKO	5 (10)	9 Oct 1911	Landers Theatre, Springfield, Missouri, U.S.	
7	Win	6–1	Mike McKimminsky	PTS	10	10 Aug 1911	Hammon, Oklahoma, U.S.	
6	Win	5–1	Frank Lyons	PTS	10	4 Jul 1911	Elk City, Oklahoma, U.S.	
5	Win	4–1	William Schiller	KO	4 (15)	15 May 1911	Maize Theatre, Oklahoma City, Oklahoma, U.S.	
4	Win	3–1	Al Mandino	PTS	4 (10)	14 Apr 1911	Benevolent A.A., Oklahoma City, Oklahoma, U.S.	
3	Win	2–1	Lewis Fink	KO	3 (15), 1:13	24 Mar 1911	Benevolent A.A., Oklahoma City, Oklahoma, U.S.	
2	Win	1–1	Ed Burke	KO	3 (10)	7 Mar 1911	Jackson's Pavilion, El Reno, Oklahoma, U.S.	
1	Loss	0–1	Lewis Fink	DQ	10 (15), 0:45	15 Feb 1911	Sapulpa Air Dome, Sapulpa, Oklahoma, U.S.	

=== Unofficial record ===
34 fights	25 wins	7 losses
By knockout	20	3
By decision	5	3
By disqualification	0	1
Draws	2	

Record with the inclusion of newspaper decisions to the win/loss/draw column.

No.	Result	Record	Opponent	Type	Round, time	Date	Location	Notes
34	Loss	25–7–2	Luis Angel Firpo	KO	8 (12), 1:55	12 Jul 1923	Boyle's Thirty Acres, Jersey City, New Jersey, U.S.	
33	Win	25–6–2	Floyd Johnson	TKO	11 (15)	12 May 1923	Yankee Stadium, Bronx, New York, U.S.	
32	Loss	24–6–2	Jack Dempsey	RTD	3 (12)	4 Jul 1919	Bay View Park Arena, Toledo, Ohio, U.S.	Lost world heavyweight title
31	Win	24–5–2	Frank Moran	NWS	10	25 Mar 1916	Madison Square Garden, New York City, New York, U.S.	NYSAC heavyweight title at stake; (via KO only)
30	Win	23–5–2	Jack Johnson	KO	26 (45), 1:26	5 Apr 1915	Oriental Park, Havana, Cuba	Won NYSAC heavyweight title
29	Win	22–5–2	George Rodel	KO	6 (10)	28 Apr 1914	Orpheum Theater, Atlanta, Georgia, U.S.	
28	Win	21–5–2	Dan Dailey	KO	9 (10)	13 Apr 1914	Broadway Auditorium, Buffalo, New York, U.S.	
27	Loss	20–5–2	Tom McMahon	NWS	12	27 Mar 1914	Grand Opera House, Youngstown, Ohio, U.S.	
26	Win	20–4–2	George Rodel	KO	9 (20)	29 Dec 1913	Casino, New Haven, Connecticut, U.S.	
25	Win	19–4–2	George Davis	KO	2 (10)	12 Dec 1913	Broadway Auditorium, Buffalo, New York, U.S.	
24	Win	18–4–2	Carl Morris	NWS	10	3 Dec 1913	Madison Square Garden, New York City, New York, U.S.	
23	Win	17–4–2	Jack Reed	TKO	2 (10)	24 Nov 1913	Princess Rink, Fort Wayne, Indiana, U.S.	
22	Loss	16–4–2	George Rodel	NWS	10	17 Nov 1913	Elite Rink, Milwaukee, Wisconsin, U.S.	
21	Win	16–3–2	Bull Young	KO	11 (20)	22 Aug 1913	Pacific A.C., Vernon, California, U.S.	Young died of injuries sustained from the fight.
20	Win	15–3–2	Al Williams	TKO	8 (10)	4 Jul 1913	Moana Springs Arena, Reno, Nevada, U.S.	
19	Draw	14–3–2	Charley Miller	PTS	4	27 Jun 1913	Dreamland Rink, San Francisco, California, U.S.	
18	Loss	14–3–1	Gunboat Smith	PTS	20	20 May 1913	Eighth Street Arena, San Francisco, California, U.S.	
17	Win	14–2–1	Jack Leon	KO	4 (10)	5 Mar 1913	Princess Rink, Fort Wayne, Indiana, U.S.	
16	Win	13–2–1	Frank Bauer	TKO	5 (10), 1:50	22 Jan 1913	Princess Rink, Fort Wayne, Indiana, U.S.	
15	Win	12–2–1	Soldier Kearns	KO	8 (10)	27 Dec 1912	Madison Square Garden, New York City, New York, U.S.	
14	Win	11–2–1	Sailor White	KO	1 (10)	2 Dec 1912	Miller's Hall, Buffalo, New York, U.S.	
13	Draw	10–2–1	Luther McCarty	NWS	10	19 Aug 1912	Madison Square Garden, New York City, New York, U.S.	
12	Win	10–2	Arthur Pelkey	NWS	10	29 Jul 1912	Madison Square Garden, New York City, New York, U.S.	
11	Win	9–2	Bull Young	KO	5	2 Jul 1912	South Chicago, Chicago, U.S.	
10	Win	8–2	Frank Bauer	TKO	3 (6)	29 May 1912	Irwin Hall, St. Charles, Missouri, U.S.	
9	Win	7–2	Bull Young	KO	6 (10)	22 May 1912	Princess Rink, Fort Wayne, Indiana, U.S.	
8	Loss	6–2	Joe Cox	TKO	5 (10)	9 Oct 1911	Landers Theatre, Springfield, Missouri, U.S.	
7	Win	6–1	Mike McKimminsky	PTS	10	10 Aug 1911	Hammon, Oklahoma, U.S.	
6	Win	5–1	Frank Lyons	PTS	10	4 Jul 1911	Elk City, Oklahoma, U.S.	
5	Win	4–1	William Schiller	KO	4 (15)	15 May 1911	Maize Theatre, Oklahoma City, Oklahoma, U.S.	
4	Win	3–1	Al Mandino	PTS	4 (10)	14 Apr 1911	Benevolent A.A., Oklahoma City, Oklahoma, U.S.	
3	Win	2–1	Lewis Fink	KO	3 (15), 1:13	24 Mar 1911	Benevolent A.A., Oklahoma City, Oklahoma, U.S.	
2	Win	1–1	Ed Burke	KO	3 (10)	7 Mar 1911	Jackson's Pavilion, El Reno, Oklahoma, U.S.	
1	Loss	0–1	Lewis Fink	DQ	10 (15), 0:45	15 Feb 1911	Sapulpa Air Dome, Sapulpa, Oklahoma, U.S.	

== Family ==
Jess Willard was a 6th great-grandson (9th generation descendant) of the Massachusetts colonist Simon Willard (1605–1676).

(1605–1676)

== See also ==
- List of heavyweight boxing champions

Achievements
Preceded by Jack Johnson	World Heavyweight Champion; April 5, 1915 – July 4, 1919	Succeeded by Jack Dempsey
Preceded by Jack Johnson	Oldest Heavyweight Champion; January 4, 1919 – July 18, 1951	Succeeded by Jersey Joe Walcott
Preceded by Tommy Burns	Oldest Living Heavyweight Champion; May 10, 1955 – December 15, 1968	Succeeded by Jack Dempsey
Preceded by James J. Jeffries	Longest Living Heavyweight Champion; November 18, 1959 – June 11, 1982	Succeeded by Jack Dempsey
Records
Preceded by Jack Johnson; 1.99 m (6 ft 0 ½ in)	Tallest world champion 1.99 m (6 ft 6 ½ in); 5 April 1915 – 26 June 1999	Succeeded by Vitali Klitschko; 2.01 m (6 ft 7 in)
