= Saint Clere, Kansas =

Unincorporated community in Pottawatomie County, Kansas

Coordinates: 39°22′09″N 96°03′21″W

Saint Clere is an unincorporated community in Pottawatomie County, Kansas, United States.

== History ==
A post office was opened in Saint Clere in 1874, and remained in operation until it was discontinued in 1953.

== Education ==
The community is served by Onaga USD 322 (north side of road) and Kaw Valley USD 321 (south side of road) public school districts.

== Notable people ==
Heavyweight boxing champion Jess Willard was born in Saint Clere.
