= Harry Wills =

American boxer (1889–1958)

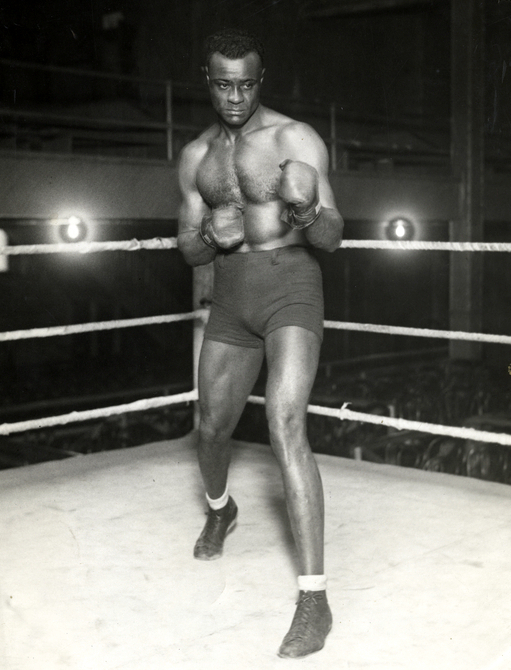
- Wills in 1916

Personal information
- Nickname: The Black Panther
- Born: Harry Wills; May 15, 1889 New Orleans, Louisiana, U.S.
- Died: December 21, 1958 (aged 69) New York, New York, U.S.
- Height: 6 ft 2 in (1.88 m)
- Weight: Heavyweight

Boxing career
- Reach: 84 in (213 cm)
- Stance: Orthodox

Boxing record
- Total fights: 111; with the inclusion of newspaper decisions
- Wins: 89
- Win by KO: 56
- Losses: 10
- Draws: 7

Harry Wills (May 15, 1889 – December 21, 1958) was an American heavyweight boxer who held the World Colored Heavyweight Championship three times. Many boxing historians consider Wills the most egregious victim of the "color line" drawn by white heavyweight champions. Wills fought for over 20 years (1911–1932), and was ranked as the number-one challenger for the world heavyweight championship, but was denied the opportunity to fight for the title. Of all the black contenders between the heavyweight championship reigns of Jack Johnson and Joe Louis, Wills came closest to securing a title shot. BoxRec ranks him among 10 best heavyweights in the world from 1913 to 1924, and as No.1 heavyweight from 1915 to 1917 and many regard him as one of the greatest heavyweights of all time.

His managers included Jim Buckley and Paddy Mullins.

== Boxing career ==
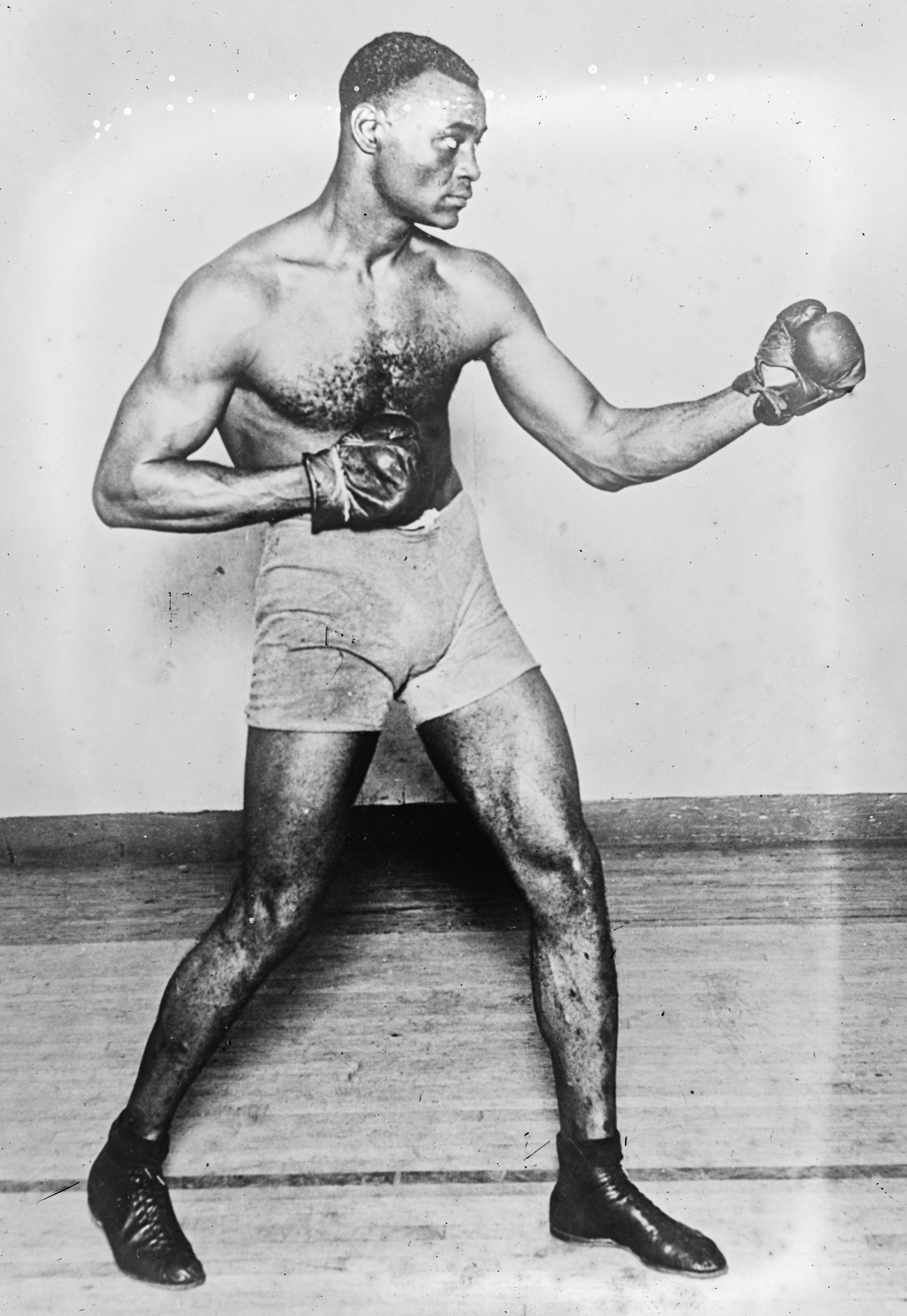
Wills in France in 1920

Wills fought many of the top heavyweights of his era. He defeated Willie Meehan, who had decisioned Jack Dempsey, Gunboat Smith and Charley Weinart. He also fought Luis Firpo in a match that ended in a no decision. Wills faced future heavyweight champion Jack Sharkey in 1926, and was being decisively beaten when he was disqualified. The next year, Wills was knocked out by heavyweight contender Paolino Uzcudun in a bout that signalled the end of his reign as a serious title contender. His final record was 75 wins (with 47 knockouts), 9 losses and 2 draws. In 2003, he was named to the Ring Magazine's list of 100 greatest punchers of all time.

The top black fighters of Wills's era were forced to repeatedly fight each other, as many white fighters also drew the "color line". As a result, Wills fought the redoubtable Sam Langford 22 times. His record against Langford was 6 wins, 2 losses and 14 no decisions. The two losses were by knockout. He beat Langford three times for the colored heavyweight title, with Langford winning it back twice. (He was forced to vacate his third title when he fought Jack Sharkey in 1926 and lost the bout due to a disqualification.) Wills also defeated colored heavyweight champ Sam McVey three times and fought two no-decision bouts with Joe Jeanette.

In May 1922, the New York Daily News polled its readers, asking them to choose Dempsey's next title opponent. Over 45,000 readers responded, and Wills finished first with 12,177 votes. Dempsey initially said he was willing to fight Wills, but the bout was never scheduled.

=== Aborted 1926 Dempsey–Wills heavyweight title match ===
Midwestern boxing promoter Floyd Fitzsimmons rendered a check to Wills for his fee, but failed to produce even a downpayment for Dempsey's much larger fee for a bout between the two fighters, who had, in July 1925, signed an agreement for a 1926 title match, which never materialized as a result. Disagreement has existed among boxing historians as to whether Dempsey had avoided Wills—though Dempsey swore he was willing to fight him—as having said he would no longer fight Black boxers after winning the title. Wills twice attempted to sue Dempsey for breach of contract over the canceled bout, which had also been barred in New York State on orders from Governor Alfred E. Smith by Athletic Commissioner James Farley, an early champion of African-American equal rights due to his public threats to resign from the Athletic Commission if Wills was not given the fight against the champion Dempsey, as Farley deemed Wills the number one contender. A deadly race riot in the wake of Jack Johnson vs. James J. Jeffries also created reluctance to promote the match. The stand taken by Commissioner Farley would help enable Farley to add the African American vote to the New Deal coalition as Franklin D. Roosevelt 's campaign manager and subsequently Chairman of the Democratic National Committee from the Republican Party, which had traditionally up until the 1930s controlled the African American voting block as the party of Lincoln.

== Retirement ==
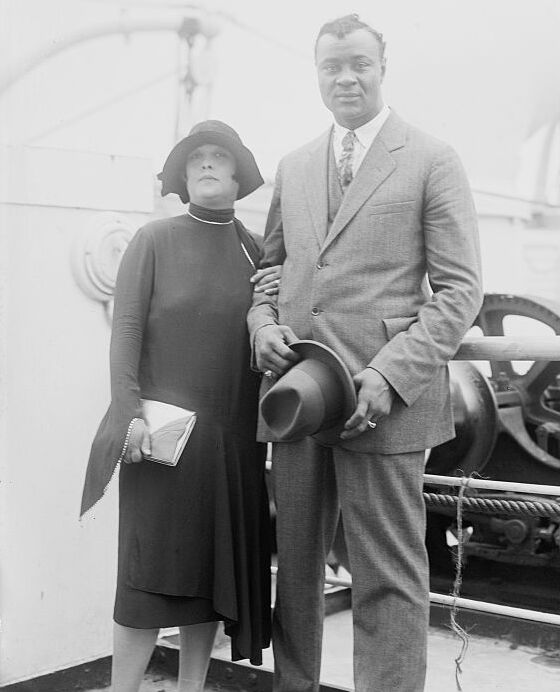
Harry and Sarah Wills

Wills retired from boxing in 1932, and ran a successful real estate business in Harlem, New York. He was known for his yearly fast, in which, once a year, he would subsist on water for a month. Wills admitted that his biggest regret in life was never getting the opportunity to fight Dempsey for the title. Wills was confident that he would have won such a match.

Wills died at Jewish Memorial Hospital in New York City of complications from diabetes on December 21, 1958.

== Legacy and honors ==
In 2020 award-winning author Mark Allen Baker published the first comprehensive account of The World Colored Heavyweight Championship, 1876–1937, with McFarland & Company, a leading independent publisher of academic & nonfiction books. This history traces the advent and demise of the Championship, the stories of the talented professional athletes who won it, and the demarcation of the color line both in and out of the ring.

For decades the World Colored Heavyweight Championship was a useful tool to combat racial oppression.

Harry Wills was inducted into the International Boxing Hall of Fame in 1992.

== Professional boxing record ==
All information in this section is derived from BoxRec, unless otherwise stated.

=== Official record ===
| 111 fights | 70 wins | 9 losses |
|---|---|---|
| By knockout | 56 | 5 |
| By decision | 14 | 1 |
| By disqualification | 0 | 3 |
| Draws | 3 | |
| No contests | 5 | |
| Newspaper decisions/draws | 24 | |

All newspaper decisions are officially regarded as “no decision” bouts and are not counted in the win/loss/draw column.

| No. | Result | Record | Opponent | Type | Round, time | Date | Location | Notes |
|---|---|---|---|---|---|---|---|---|
| 111 | Win | 70–9–3 (29) | Big John Glover | KO | 1 (10), 1:05 | Oct 19, 1932 | Municipal Auditorium, Atlanta, Georgia, U.S. | |
| 110 | Win | 69–9–3 (29) | Vinko Jakasa | KO | 1 (10), 1:20 | Aug 4, 1932 | Fort Hamilton Arena, New York City, New York, U.S. | |
| 109 | Win | 68–9–3 (29) | Jack Rose | KO | 6 (10) | Feb 11, 1931 | Coliseum Arena, New Orleans, Louisiana, U.S. | |
| 108 | Win | 67–9–3 (29) | Andres Castano | KO | 3 (10), 1:06 | Dec 11, 1929 | New York Coliseum, New York City, New York, U.S. | |
| 107 | Loss | 66–9–3 (29) | Andres Castano | DQ | 1 (12) | Sep 14, 1929 | El Toreo de Cuatro Caminos, Mexico City, Mexico | For Mexico heavyweight title; Wills DQ'd for hitting Castano after the bell |
| 106 | Loss | 66–8–3 (29) | Paulino Uzcudun | KO | 4 (15), (1:27) | Jul 13, 1927 | Ebbets Field, New York City, New York, U.S. | |
| 105 | Loss | 66–7–3 (29) | Jack Sharkey | DQ | 13 (15), (0:43) | Oct 12, 1926 | Ebbets Field, New York City, New York, U.S. | Wills DQ'd for illegal backhand |
| 104 | Win | 66–6–3 (29) | Floyd Johnson | TKO | 1 (12), (2:02) | Oct 26, 1925 | 1st Regiment Armory, Newark, New Jersey, U.S. | |
| 103 | Win | 65–6–3 (29) | Charley Weinert | KO | 2 (10) | Jul 2, 1925 | Polo Grounds, New York City, New York, U.S. | |
| 102 | Win | 64–6–3 (29) | Luis Ángel Firpo | NWS | 12 | Sep 11, 1924 | Boyle's Thirty Acres, Jersey City, New Jersey, U.S. | |
| 101 | Win | 64–6–3 (28) | Bartley Madden | PTS | 15 | Jun 9, 1924 | Queensboro Stadium, New York City, New York, U.S. | |
| 100 | Win | 63–6–3 (28) | Jack Thompson | TKO | 4 (12), 2:06 | Nov 5, 1923 | 1st Regiment Armory, Newark, New Jersey, U.S. | Retained world colored heavyweight title |
| 99 | Win | 62–6–3 (28) | Homer Smith | KO | 2 (10), 2:06 | Oct 11, 1923 | Queensboro Stadium, New York City, New York, U.S. | |
| 98 | Win | 61–6–3 (28) | Clem Johnson | TKO | 12 (?), 1:55 | Sep 29, 1922 | Madison Square Garden, New York City, New York, U.S. | Retained world colored heavyweight title |
| 97 | Win | 60–6–3 (28) | Tut Jackson | KO | 3 (15), 2:05 | Aug 29, 1922 | Ebbets Field, New York City, New York, U.S. | Retained world colored heavyweight title |
| 96 | Win | 59–6–3 (28) | Buddy Jackson | KO | 2 (12), 2:14 | Aug 21, 1922 | Broad A.C., Newark, New Jersey, U.S. | Retained world colored heavyweight title |
| 95 | Win | 58–6–3 (28) | Jeff Clark | KO | 3 (10) | Jul 17, 1922 | Amphitheatre Rink, Winnipeg, Manitoba, Canada | Retained world colored heavyweight title |
| 94 | Win | 57–6–3 (28) | Jeff Clark | TKO | 2 (12) | Jun 30, 1922 | Trenton, New Jersey, U.S. | Retained world colored heavyweight title |
| 93 | Win | 56–6–3 (28) | Kid Norfolk | KO | 2 (15) | Mar 2, 1922 | Madison Square Garden, New York City, New York, U.S. | |
| 92 | Win | 55–6–3 (28) | Sam Langford | PTS | 10 | Jan 17, 1922 | Arena, Milwaukie, Oregon, U.S. | Retained world colored heavyweight title |
| 91 | Draw | 54–6–3 (28) | Bill Tate | PTS | 10 | Jan 6, 1922 | Arena, Milwaukie, Oregon, U.S. | Both fighter claimed the black heavyweight title |
| 90 | Loss | 54–6–2 (28) | Bill Tate | DQ | 1 (10), 2:50 | Jan 2, 1922 | Arena, Milwaukie, Oregon, U.S. | Tate claimed the black heavyweight title; Wills DQ'd for knocking down Tate on the referee's break |
| 89 | Win | 54–5–2 (28) | Bill Tate | PTS | 12 | Dec 8, 1921 | Stockyards Stadium, Denver, Colorado, U.S. | Retained world colored heavyweight title |
| 88 | NC | 53–5–2 (28) | Jack Thompson | NC | 5 (12) | Nov 30, 1921 | Stockyards Stadium, Denver, Colorado, U.S. | World colored heavyweight title at stake; Referee stopped the fight, but gave no decision after Thompson fell and claimed a foul |
| 87 | Win | 53–5–2 (27) | Denver Ed Martin | KO | 1 (10), 2:05 | Nov 18, 1921 | Arena, Milwaukie, Oregon, U.S. | Retained world colored heavyweight title |
| 86 | Win | 52–5–2 (27) | Clem Johnson | TKO | 6 (12) | Nov 10, 1921 | Riverside Arena, Covington, Kentucky, U.S. | |
| 85 | Win | 51–5–2 (27) | Edward "Gunboat" Smith | KO | 1 (20), 1:07 | Oct 10, 1921 | Stadium, Havana, Cuba | |
| 84 | Win | 50–5–2 (27) | Bill Tate | TKO | 6 (15) | Jul 2, 1921 | Queensboro Stadium, New York City, New York, U.S. | Retained world colored heavyweight title |
| 83 | Win | 49–5–2 (27) | Ray Bennett | KO | 1 (15), 2:12 | Jun 4, 1921 | Queensboro Stadium, New York City, New York, U.S. | |
| 82 | Win | 48–5–2 (27) | Battling Jim McCreary | KO | 7 (10) | Jun 3, 1921 | Arena, Syracuse, New York, U.S. | |
| 81 | Win | 47–5–2 (27) | Andy Johnson | KO | 1 (?) | May 27, 1921 | Broadway Arena, New York City, New York, U.S. | Retained world colored heavyweight title |
| 80 | Win | 46–5–2 (27) | Jack Thompson | NWS | 8 | Apr 8, 1921 | Odeon Theater, Saint Louis, Missouri, U.S. | |
| 79 | Win | 46–5–2 (26) | Jeff Clark | TKO | 2 (12) | Feb 11, 1921 | Bob Wright's Coliseum, Highlandtown, Maryland, U.S. | Retained world colored heavyweight title |
| 78 | Win | 45–5–2 (26) | Bill Tate | KO | 2 (15), 1:18 | Jan 17, 1921 | Broadway Auditorium, Buffalo, New York, U.S. | Retained world colored heavyweight title |
| 77 | Win | 44–5–2 (26) | Jeff Clark | TKO | 4 (10) | Sep 15, 1920 | Municipal Auditorium, Atlanta, Georgia, U.S. | |
| 76 | NC | 43–5–2 (26) | Sam McVea | NC | 6 (8) | Sep 8, 1920 | Ice Palace, Philadelphia, Pennsylvania, U.S. | World colored heavyweight title at stake; Fight stopped for "stalling" |
| 75 | Win | 43–5–2 (25) | Fred Fulton | KO | 3 (12), 2:35 | Jul 26, 1920 | 1st Regiment Armory, Newark, New Jersey, U.S. | |
| 74 | Win | 42–5–2 (25) | Ray Bennett | TKO | 1 (4) | Jun 1, 1920 | Armory A.A. Hall, Bridgeport, Connecticut, U.S. | |
| 73 | Win | 41–5–2 (25) | Sam Langford | PTS | 15 | Apr 23, 1920 | Stockyards Stadium, Denver, Colorado, U.S. | Retained world colored heavyweight title |
| 72 | Win | 40–5–2 (25) | Andy Johnson | KO | 1 (10) | Mar 17, 1920 | Auditorium, Saint Paul, Minnesota, U.S. | Retained world colored heavyweight title |
| 71 | Win | 39–5–2 (25) | Jack Thompson | PTS | 15 | Jan 12, 1920 | Convention Hall, Tulsa, Oklahoma, U.S. | Retained world colored heavyweight title |
| 70 | NC | 38–5–2 (25) | Jack Thompson | NC | 3 (4) | Jan 1, 1920 | Coliseum, San Francisco, California, U.S. | World colored heavyweight title at stake |
| 69 | Win | 38–5–2 (24) | Ole Anderson | TKO | 3 (4) | Dec 4, 1919 | Coliseum, San Francisco, California, U.S. | |
| 68 | Win | 37–5–2 (24) | Edward K.O. Kruvosky | TKO | 1 (4) | Nov 20, 1919 | Coliseum, San Francisco, California, U.S. | |
| 67 | Win | 36–5–2 (24) | Sam Langford | PTS | 15 | Nov 5, 1919 | Convention Hall, Tulsa, Oklahoma, U.S. | Retained world colored heavyweight title |
| 66 | Win | 35–5–2 (24) | Joe Jennette | NWS | 8 | Oct 20, 1919 | 4th Regiment Armory, Jersey City, New Jersey, U.S. | World colored heavyweight title at stake; (via KO only) |
| 65 | Win | 35–5–2 (23) | Sam Langford | NWS | 10 | Sep 30, 1919 | Arena, Syracuse, New York, U.S. | World colored heavyweight title at stake; (via KO only) |
| 64 | Win | 35–5–2 (22) | Jeff Clark | TKO | 4 (10) | Aug 18, 1919 | Arena, Syracuse, New York, U.S. | Retained world colored heavyweight title |
| 63 | Win | 34–5–2 (22) | Sam Langford | NWS | 8 | Jul 4, 1919 | Sportsman's Park, Saint Louis, Missouri, U.S. | World colored heavyweight title at stake; (via KO only) |
| 62 | Win | 34–5–2 (21) | John Lester Johnson | NWS | 8 | Jun 10, 1919 | Jersey City, New Jersey, U.S. | World colored heavyweight title at stake; (via KO only) |
| 61 | Draw | 34–5–2 (20) | Jack Thompson | NWS | 8 | Nov 15, 1918 | Atlantic City S.C., Atlantic City, New Jersey, U.S. | |
| 60 | Win | 34–5–2 (19) | Jack Thompson | NWS | 6 | Sep 14, 1918 | National A.C., Philadelphia, Pennsylvania, U.S. | |
| 59 | Win | 34–5–2 (18) | Jeff Clark | TKO | 5 (8) | Aug 19, 1918 | Atlantic City S.C., Atlantic City, New Jersey, U.S. | Retained world colored heavyweight title |
| 58 | Win | 33–5–2 (18) | Sam McVea | PTS | 20 | Jun 16, 1918 | Plaza de Toros Vista Alegre, Panama City, Panama | Retained world colored heavyweight title |
| 57 | Win | 32–5–2 (18) | Sam Langford | TKO | 8 (20) | May 19, 1918 | Plaza de Toros Vista Alegre, Panama City, Panama | Retained world colored heavyweight title |
| 56 | Win | 31–5–2 (18) | Sam Langford | KO | 6 (20) | Apr 14, 1918 | Plaza de Toros Vista Alegre, Panama City, Panama | Won world colored heavyweight title |
| 55 | Win | 30–5–2 (18) | Sam McVea | KO | 5 (20) | Feb 17, 1918 | Plaza de Toros Vista Alegre, Panama City, Panama | |
| 54 | Win | 29–5–2 (18) | Jeff Clark | TKO | 5 (15) | Dec 16, 1917 | Plaza de Toros Vista Alegre, Panama City, Panama | |
| 53 | Draw | 28–5–2 (18) | Sam Langford | NWS | 12 | Nov 12, 1917 | Coliseum, Toledo, Ohio, U.S. | World colored heavyweight title at stake; (via KO only) |
| 52 | Win | 28–5–2 (17) | Sam Langford | NWS | 10 | Sep 20, 1917 | Clermont Avenue Rink, New York City, New York, U.S. | World colored heavyweight title at stake; (via KO only) |
| 51 | Win | 28–5–2 (16) | Battling Jim Johnson | NWS | 10 | Jun 1, 1917 | Harlem S.C., New York City, New York, U.S. | |
| 50 | Win | 28–5–2 (15) | Sam Langford | NWS | 6 | May 11, 1917 | Cambria A.C., Philadelphia, Pennsylvania, U.S. | |
| 49 | Win | 28–5–2 (14) | Jack Thompson | NWS | 10 | Apr 30, 1917 | Vanderbilt A.C., New York City, New York, U.S. | |
| 48 | Loss | 28–5–2 (13) | Battling Jim Johnson | TKO | 2 (12) | Feb 7, 1917 | Future City A.C., Saint Louis, Missouri, U.S. | |
| 47 | Win | 28–4–2 (13) | Jack Thompson | NWS | 10 | Nov 28, 1916 | Clermont Avenue Rink, New York City, New York, U.S. | |
| 46 | Win | 28–4–2 (12) | Jack Thompson | KO | 8 (10) | Nov 18, 1916 | Fairmont A.C., New York City, New York, U.S. | |
| 45 | Win | 27–4–2 (12) | Bill Tate | NWS | 10 | Nov 11, 1916 | Clermont Avenue Rink, New York City, New York, U.S. | |
| 44 | Win | 27–4–2 (11) | George Kid Cotton | TKO | 4 (10) | Oct 13, 1916 | Harlem S.C., New York City, New York, U.S. | |
| 43 | Win | 26–4–2 (11) | George Kid Cotton | TKO | 4 (10) | Jun 3, 1916 | Clermont Avenue Rink, New York City, New York, U.S. | |
| 42 | Win | 25–4–2 (11) | Jeff Clark | PTS | 20 | May 19, 1916 | Louisiana Auditorium, New Orleans, Louisiana, U.S. | |
| 41 | Win | 24–4–2 (11) | Sam Langford | NWS | 8 | Apr 25, 1916 | Coliseum, Saint Louis, Missouri, U.S. | |
| 40 | Win | 24–4–2 (10) | John Lester Johnson | NWS | 10 | Apr 7, 1916 | Harlem S.C., New York City, New York, U.S. | |
| 39 | Win | 24–4–2 (9) | Sam Langford | NWS | 10 | Mar 7, 1916 | Broadway Arena, New York City, New York, U.S. | World colored heavyweight title claim at stake; (via KO only) |
| 38 | Loss | 24–4–2 (8) | Sam Langford | KO | 19 (20) | Feb 11, 1916 | Tommy Burns Arena, New Orleans, Louisiana, U.S. | Lost world colored heavyweight title claim |
| 37 | Win | 24–3–2 (8) | Sam Langford | PTS | 20 | Jan 3, 1916 | Tulane A.C., New Orleans, Louisiana, U.S. | Retained world colored heavyweight title claim |
| 36 | Win | 23–3–2 (8) | Sam Langford | NWS | 10 | Dec 3, 1915 | Harlem S.C., New York City, New York, U.S. | World colored heavyweight title claim at stake; (via KO only) |
| 35 | Win | 23–3–2 (7) | Sam McVea | PTS | 12 | Sep 7, 1915 | Atlas A.A., Boston, Massachusetts, U.S. | Won world colored heavyweight title claim |
| 34 | Win | 22–3–2 (7) | Battling Jim Johnson | NWS | 10 | Jul 5, 1915 | Sacandaga Park, Gloversville, New York, U.S. | |
| 33 | Loss | 22–3–2 (6) | Sam McVea | NWS | 10 | May 19, 1915 | St. Nicholas Arena, New York City, New York, U.S. | |
| 32 | Win | 22–3–2 (5) | John Lester Johnson | PTS | 20 | Mar 12, 1915 | Tommy Burns Arena, New Orleans, Louisiana, U.S. | |
| 31 | Loss | 21–3–2 (5) | Sam McVea | PTS | 20 | Dec 20, 1914 | McDonoghville Park, New Orleans, Louisiana, U.S. | |
| 30 | Loss | 21–2–2 (5) | Sam Langford | KO | 14 (20) | Nov 26, 1914 | Arena, Vernon, California, U.S. | For world colored heavyweight title |
| 29 | Win | 21–1–2 (5) | Jim Cameron | PTS | 4 | Oct 30, 1914 | Dreamland Rink, San Francisco, California, U.S. | |
| 28 | Win | 20–1–2 (5) | Charles Horn | KO | 1 (4) | Oct 16, 1914 | Dreamland Rink, San Francisco, California, U.S. | |
| 27 | Win | 19–1–2 (5) | Charles "Sailor" Grande | PTS | 4 | Oct 9, 1914 | Dreamland Rink, San Francisco, California, U.S. | |
| 26 | Win | 18–1–2 (5) | Charlie Miller | KO | 1 (4) | Sep 18, 1914 | Dreamland Rink, San Francisco, California, U.S. | |
| 25 | Win | 17–1–2 (5) | Willie Meehan | PTS | 4 | Sep 4, 1914 | Dreamland Rink, San Francisco, California, U.S. | |
| 24 | Win | 16–1–2 (5) | Battling Brandt | TKO | 4 (4) | Aug 21, 1914 | Pavilion Rink, San Francisco, California, U.S. | |
| 23 | Win | 15–1–2 (5) | Mexican Pete Everett | KO | 2 (?) | Aug 2, 1914 | Sonora, Sonora, Mexico | |
| 22 | Win | 14–1–2 (5) | Soldier Elder | KO | 1 (?) | Jul 4, 1914 | El Paso, Texas, U.S. | |
| 21 | Draw | 13–1–2 (5) | Joe Jennette | NWS | 10 | Jun 9, 1914 | National Baseball Park, New Orleans, Louisiana, U.S. | |
| 20 | Draw | 13–1–2 (4) | Sam Langford | NWS | 10 | May 1, 1914 | National Baseball Park, New Orleans, Louisiana, U.S. | World colored heavyweight title at stake; (via (KO) only) |
| 19 | Win | 13–1–2 (3) | Rough House Ware | KO | 10 (20) | Feb 7, 1914 | New Orleans, Louisiana, U.S. | Exact date unknown |
| 18 | Win | 12–1–2 (3) | George Kid Cotton | KO | 4 (10) | Jan 8, 1914 | Northside A.C., New Orleans, Louisiana, U.S. | |
| 17 | Win | 11–1–2 (3) | Jimmy Sullivan | KO | 1 (10) | Dec 9, 1913 | Northside A.C., New Orleans, Louisiana, U.S. | |
| 16 | Win | 10–1–2 (3) | George Kid Cotton | KO | 3 (10) | Oct 3, 1913 | Pelican Stadium, New Orleans, Louisiana, U.S. | |
| 15 | Draw | 9–1–2 (3) | Joe Jennette | PTS | 10 | Jul 1, 1913 | Northside A.C., New Orleans, Louisiana, U.S. | |
| 14 | Draw | 9–1–1 (3) | Jeff Clark | PTS | 10 | Jun 18, 1913 | New Orleans, Louisiana, U.S. | |
| 13 | Win | 9–1 (3) | Kid Brown | KO | 2 (?) | Feb 2, 1913 | New Orleans, Louisiana, U.S. | Exact date unknown |
| 12 | ND | 8–1 (3) | Jack Graves | ND | 10 | Jan 1, 1913 | United States of America | Date and location of this fight unknown |
| 11 | Win | 8–1 (2) | Jack Tholmer | KO | 5 (10) | Nov 20, 1912 | Northside A.C., New Orleans, Louisiana, U.S. | |
| 10 | ND | 7–1 (2) | Dave Mills | ND | 10 | Aug 13, 1912 | Elks Club, El Paso, Texas, U.S. | |
| 9 | Win | 7–1 (1) | Kid Brown | KO | 6 (?) | May 5, 1912 | New Orleans, Louisiana, U.S. | Exact date unknown |
| 8 | Win | 6–1 (1) | Ben Peden | KO | 3 (?) | Apr 4, 1912 | New Orleans, Louisiana, U.S. | Exact date unknown |
| 7 | Loss | 5–1 (1) | George Kid Cotton | KO | 2 (10) | Feb 14, 1912 | Louisiana A.C., New Orleans, Louisiana, U.S. | |
| 6 | Win | 5–0 (1) | Sam Collier | KO | 7 (?) | Feb 2, 1912 | New Orleans, Louisiana, U.S. | |
| 5 | Win | 4–0 (1) | Harry Brown | KO | 2 (?) | Jan 1, 1912 | New Orleans, Louisiana, U.S. | Exact date unknown |
| 4 | Win | 3–0 (1) | Nat Dewey | NWS | 10 | Oct 25, 1911 | Louisiana A.C., New Orleans, Louisiana, U.S. | |
| 3 | Win | 3–0 | Kid Navarro | KO | 1 (?) | Mar 1, 1911 | New Orleans, Louisiana, U.S. | Exact date unknown |
| 2 | Win | 2–0 | Battling Taylor | KO | 4 (?) | Feb 2, 1911 | Rock Island, Illinois, U.S. | Exact date unknown |
| 1 | Win | 1–0 | Casey White | KO | 4 (?) | Jan 2, 1911 | Chicago, Illinois, U.S. | Professional debut; Exact date unknown |

=== Unofficial record ===
| 111 fights | 89 wins | 10 losses |
|---|---|---|
| By knockout | 56 | 6 |
| By decision | 33 | 1 |
| By disqualification | 0 | 3 |
| Draws | 7 | |
| No contests | 5 | |

Record with the inclusion of newspaper decisions in the win/loss/draw column.

| No. | Result | Record | Opponent | Type | Round | Date | Location | Notes |
|---|---|---|---|---|---|---|---|---|
| 111 | Win | 89–10–7 (5) | Big John Glover | KO | 1 (10), 1:05 | Oct 19, 1932 | Municipal Auditorium, Atlanta, Georgia, U.S. | |
| 110 | Win | 88–10–7 (5) | Vinko Jakasa | KO | 1 (10), 1:20 | Aug 4, 1932 | Fort Hamilton Arena, New York City, New York, U.S. | |
| 109 | Win | 87–10–7 (5) | Jack Rose | KO | 6 (10) | Feb 11, 1931 | Coliseum Arena, New Orleans, Louisiana, U.S. | |
| 108 | Win | 86–10–7 (5) | Andres Castano | KO | 3 (10), 1:06 | Dec 11, 1929 | New York Coliseum, New York City, New York, U.S. | |
| 107 | Loss | 85–10–7 (5) | Andres Castano | DQ | 1 (12) | Sep 14, 1929 | El Toreo de Cuatro Caminos, Mexico City, Mexico | For Mexico heavyweight title; Wills DQ'd for hitting Castano after the bell |
| 106 | Loss | 85–9–7 (5) | Paulino Uzcudun | KO | 4 (15), (1:27) | Jul 13, 1927 | Ebbets Field, New York City, New York, U.S. | |
| 105 | Loss | 85–8–7 (5) | Jack Sharkey | DQ | 13 (15), (0:43) | Oct 12, 1926 | Ebbets Field, New York City, New York, U.S. | Wills DQ'd for illegal backhand |
| 104 | Win | 85–7–7 (5) | Floyd Johnson | TKO | 1 (12), (2:02) | Oct 26, 1925 | 1st Regiment Armory, Newark, New Jersey, U.S. | |
| 103 | Win | 84–7–7 (5) | Charley Weinert | KO | 2 (10) | Jul 2, 1925 | Polo Grounds, New York City, New York, U.S. | |
| 102 | Win | 83–7–7 (5) | Luis Ángel Firpo | NWS | 12 | Sep 11, 1924 | Boyle's Thirty Acres, Jersey City, New Jersey, U.S. | |
| 101 | Win | 82–7–7 (5) | Bartley Madden | PTS | 15 | Jun 9, 1924 | Queensboro Stadium, New York City, New York, U.S. | |
| 100 | Win | 81–7–7 (5) | Jack Thompson | TKO | 4 (12), 2:06 | Nov 5, 1923 | 1st Regiment Armory, Newark, New Jersey, U.S. | Retained world colored heavyweight title |
| 99 | Win | 80–7–7 (5) | Homer Smith | KO | 2 (10), 2:06 | Oct 11, 1923 | Queensboro Stadium, New York City, New York, U.S. | |
| 98 | Win | 79–7–7 (5) | Clem Johnson | TKO | 12 (?), 1:55 | Sep 29, 1922 | Madison Square Garden, New York City, New York, U.S. | Retained world colored heavyweight title |
| 97 | Win | 78–7–7 (5) | Tut Jackson | KO | 3 (15), 2:05 | Aug 29, 1922 | Ebbets Field, New York City, New York, U.S. | Retained world colored heavyweight title |
| 96 | Win | 77–7–7 (5) | Buddy Jackson | KO | 2 (12), 2:14 | Aug 21, 1922 | Broad A.C., Newark, New Jersey, U.S. | Retained world colored heavyweight title |
| 95 | Win | 76–7–7 (5) | Jeff Clark | KO | 3 (10) | Jul 17, 1922 | Amphitheatre Rink, Winnipeg, Manitoba, Canada | Retained world colored heavyweight title |
| 94 | Win | 75–7–7 (5) | Jeff Clark | TKO | 2 (12) | Jun 30, 1922 | Trenton, New Jersey, U.S. | Retained world colored heavyweight title |
| 93 | Win | 74–7–7 (5) | Kid Norfolk | KO | 2 (15) | Mar 2, 1922 | Madison Square Garden, New York City, New York, U.S. | |
| 92 | Win | 73–7–7 (5) | Sam Langford | PTS | 10 | Jan 17, 1922 | Arena, Milwaukie, Oregon, U.S. | Retained world colored heavyweight title |
| 91 | Draw | 72–7–7 (5) | Bill Tate | PTS | 10 | Jan 6, 1922 | Arena, Milwaukie, Oregon, U.S. | Both fighter claimed the black heavyweight title |
| 90 | Loss | 72–7–6 (5) | Bill Tate | DQ | 1 (10), 2:50 | Jan 2, 1922 | Arena, Milwaukie, Oregon, U.S. | Tate claimed the black heavyweight title; Wills DQ'd for knocking down Tate on the referee's break |
| 89 | Win | 72–6–6 (5) | Bill Tate | PTS | 12 | Dec 8, 1921 | Stockyards Stadium, Denver, Colorado, U.S. | Retained world colored heavyweight title |
| 88 | NC | 71–6–6 (5) | Jack Thompson | NC | 5 (12) | Nov 30, 1921 | Stockyards Stadium, Denver, Colorado, U.S. | World colored heavyweight title at stake; Referee stopped the fight, but gave no decision after Thompson fell and claimed a foul |
| 87 | Win | 71–6–6 (4) | Denver Ed Martin | KO | 1 (10), 2:05 | Nov 18, 1921 | Arena, Milwaukie, Oregon, U.S. | Retained world colored heavyweight title |
| 86 | Win | 70–6–6 (4) | Clem Johnson | TKO | 6 (12) | Nov 10, 1921 | Riverside Arena, Covington, Kentucky, U.S. | |
| 85 | Win | 69–6–6 (4) | Edward "Gunboat" Smith | KO | 1 (20), 1:07 | Oct 10, 1921 | Stadium, Havana, Cuba | |
| 84 | Win | 68–6–6 (4) | Bill Tate | TKO | 6 (15) | Jul 2, 1921 | Queensboro Stadium, New York City, New York, U.S. | Retained world colored heavyweight title |
| 83 | Win | 67–6–6 (4) | Ray Bennett | KO | 1 (15), 2:12 | Jun 4, 1921 | Queensboro Stadium, New York City, New York, U.S. | |
| 82 | Win | 66–6–6 (4) | Battling Jim McCreary | KO | 7 (10) | Jun 3, 1921 | Arena, Syracuse, New York, U.S. | |
| 81 | Win | 65–6–6 (4) | Andy Johnson | KO | 1 (?) | May 27, 1921 | Broadway Arena, New York City, New York, U.S. | Retained world colored heavyweight title |
| 80 | Win | 64–6–6 (4) | Jack Thompson | NWS | 8 | Apr 8, 1921 | Odeon Theater, Saint Louis, Missouri, U.S. | |
| 79 | Win | 63–6–6 (4) | Jeff Clark | TKO | 2 (12) | Feb 11, 1921 | Bob Wright's Coliseum, Highlandtown, Maryland, U.S. | Retained world colored heavyweight title |
| 78 | Win | 62–6–6 (4) | Bill Tate | KO | 2 (15), 1:18 | Jan 17, 1921 | Broadway Auditorium, Buffalo, New York, U.S. | Retained world colored heavyweight title |
| 77 | Win | 61–6–6 (4) | Jeff Clark | TKO | 4 (10) | Sep 15, 1920 | Municipal Auditorium, Atlanta, Georgia, U.S. | |
| 76 | NC | 60–6–6 (4) | Sam McVea | NC | 6 (8) | Sep 8, 1920 | Ice Palace, Philadelphia, Pennsylvania, U.S. | World colored heavyweight title at stake; Fight stopped for "stalling" |
| 75 | Win | 60–6–6 (3) | Fred Fulton | KO | 3 (12), 2:35 | Jul 26, 1920 | 1st Regiment Armory, Newark, New Jersey, U.S. | |
| 74 | Win | 59–6–6 (3) | Ray Bennett | TKO | 1 (4) | Jun 1, 1920 | Armory A.A. Hall, Bridgeport, Connecticut, U.S. | |
| 73 | Win | 58–6–6 (3) | Sam Langford | PTS | 15 | Apr 23, 1920 | Stockyards Stadium, Denver, Colorado, U.S. | Retained world colored heavyweight title |
| 72 | Win | 57–6–6 (3) | Andy Johnson | KO | 1 (10) | Mar 17, 1920 | Auditorium, Saint Paul, Minnesota, U.S. | Retained world colored heavyweight title |
| 71 | Win | 56–6–6 (3) | Jack Thompson | PTS | 15 | Jan 12, 1920 | Convention Hall, Tulsa, Oklahoma, U.S. | Retained world colored heavyweight title |
| 70 | NC | 55–6–6 (3) | Jack Thompson | NC | 3 (4) | Jan 1, 1920 | Coliseum, San Francisco, California, U.S. | World colored heavyweight title at stake |
| 69 | Win | 55–6–6 (2) | Ole Anderson | TKO | 3 (4) | Dec 4, 1919 | Coliseum, San Francisco, California, U.S. | |
| 68 | Win | 54–6–6 (2) | Edward K.O. Kruvosky | TKO | 1 (4) | Nov 20, 1919 | Coliseum, San Francisco, California, U.S. | |
| 67 | Win | 53–6–6 (2) | Sam Langford | PTS | 15 | Nov 5, 1919 | Convention Hall, Tulsa, Oklahoma, U.S. | Retained world colored heavyweight title |
| 66 | Win | 52–6–6 (2) | Joe Jennette | NWS | 8 | Oct 20, 1919 | 4th Regiment Armory, Jersey City, New Jersey, U.S. | World colored heavyweight title at stake; (via KO only) |
| 65 | Win | 51–6–6 (2) | Sam Langford | NWS | 10 | Sep 30, 1919 | Arena, Syracuse, New York, U.S. | World colored heavyweight title at stake; (via KO only) |
| 64 | Win | 50–6–6 (2) | Jeff Clark | TKO | 4 (10) | Aug 18, 1919 | Arena, Syracuse, New York, U.S. | Retained world colored heavyweight title |
| 63 | Win | 49–6–6 (2) | Sam Langford | NWS | 8 | Jul 4, 1919 | Sportsman's Park, Saint Louis, Missouri, U.S. | World colored heavyweight title at stake; (via KO only) |
| 62 | Win | 48–6–6 (2) | John Lester Johnson | NWS | 8 | Jun 10, 1919 | Jersey City, New Jersey, U.S. | World colored heavyweight title at stake; (via KO only) |
| 61 | Draw | 47–6–6 (2) | Jack Thompson | NWS | 8 | Nov 15, 1918 | Atlantic City S.C., Atlantic City, New Jersey, U.S. | |
| 60 | Win | 47–6–5 (2) | Jack Thompson | NWS | 6 | Sep 14, 1918 | National A.C., Philadelphia, Pennsylvania, U.S. | |
| 59 | Win | 46–6–5 (2) | Jeff Clark | TKO | 5 (8) | Aug 19, 1918 | Atlantic City S.C., Atlantic City, New Jersey, U.S. | Retained world colored heavyweight title |
| 58 | Win | 45–6–5 (2) | Sam McVea | PTS | 20 | Jun 16, 1918 | Plaza de Toros Vista Alegre, Panama City, Panama | Retained world colored heavyweight title |
| 57 | Win | 44–6–5 (2) | Sam Langford | TKO | 8 (20) | May 19, 1918 | Plaza de Toros Vista Alegre, Panama City, Panama | Retained world colored heavyweight title |
| 56 | Win | 43–6–5 (2) | Sam Langford | KO | 6 (20) | Apr 14, 1918 | Plaza de Toros Vista Alegre, Panama City, Panama | Won world colored heavyweight title |
| 55 | Win | 42–6–5 (2) | Sam McVea | KO | 5 (20) | Feb 17, 1918 | Plaza de Toros Vista Alegre, Panama City, Panama | |
| 54 | Win | 41–6–5 (2) | Jeff Clark | TKO | 5 (15) | Dec 16, 1917 | Plaza de Toros Vista Alegre, Panama City, Panama | |
| 53 | Draw | 40–6–5 (2) | Sam Langford | NWS | 12 | Nov 12, 1917 | Coliseum, Toledo, Ohio, U.S. | World colored heavyweight title at stake; (via KO only) |
| 52 | Win | 40–6–4 (2) | Sam Langford | NWS | 10 | Sep 20, 1917 | Clermont Avenue Rink, New York City, New York, U.S. | World colored heavyweight title at stake; (via KO only) |
| 51 | Win | 39–6–4 (2) | Battling Jim Johnson | NWS | 10 | Jun 1, 1917 | Harlem S.C., New York City, New York, U.S. | |
| 50 | Win | 38–6–4 (2) | Sam Langford | NWS | 6 | May 11, 1917 | Cambria A.C., Philadelphia, Pennsylvania, U.S. | |
| 49 | Win | 37–6–4 (2) | Jack Thompson | NWS | 10 | Apr 30, 1917 | Vanderbilt A.C., New York City, New York, U.S. | |
| 48 | Loss | 36–6–4 (2) | Battling Jim Johnson | TKO | 2 (12) | Feb 7, 1917 | Future City A.C., Saint Louis, Missouri, U.S. | |
| 47 | Win | 36–5–4 (2) | Jack Thompson | NWS | 10 | Nov 28, 1916 | Clermont Avenue Rink, New York City, New York, U.S. | |
| 46 | Win | 35–5–4 (2) | Jack Thompson | KO | 8 (10) | Nov 18, 1916 | Fairmont A.C., New York City, New York, U.S. | |
| 45 | Win | 34–5–4 (2) | Bill Tate | NWS | 10 | Nov 11, 1916 | Clermont Avenue Rink, New York City, New York, U.S. | |
| 44 | Win | 33–5–4 (2) | George Kid Cotton | TKO | 4 (10) | Oct 13, 1916 | Harlem S.C., New York City, New York, U.S. | |
| 43 | Win | 32–5–4 (2) | George Kid Cotton | TKO | 4 (10) | Jun 3, 1916 | Clermont Avenue Rink, New York City, New York, U.S. | |
| 42 | Win | 31–5–4 (2) | Jeff Clark | PTS | 20 | May 19, 1916 | Louisiana Auditorium, New Orleans, Louisiana, U.S. | |
| 41 | Win | 30–5–4 (2) | Sam Langford | NWS | 8 | Apr 25, 1916 | Coliseum, Saint Louis, Missouri, U.S. | |
| 40 | Win | 29–5–4 (2) | John Lester Johnson | NWS | 10 | Apr 7, 1916 | Harlem S.C., New York City, New York, U.S. | |
| 39 | Win | 28–5–4 (2) | Sam Langford | NWS | 10 | Mar 7, 1916 | Broadway Arena, New York City, New York, U.S. | World colored heavyweight title claim at stake; (via KO only) |
| 38 | Loss | 27–5–4 (2) | Sam Langford | KO | 19 (20) | Feb 11, 1916 | Tommy Burns Arena, New Orleans, Louisiana, U.S. | Lost world colored heavyweight title claim |
| 37 | Win | 27–4–4 (2) | Sam Langford | PTS | 20 | Jan 3, 1916 | Tulane A.C., New Orleans, Louisiana, U.S. | Retained world colored heavyweight title claim |
| 36 | Win | 26–4–4 (2) | Sam Langford | NWS | 10 | Dec 3, 1915 | Harlem S.C., New York City, New York, U.S. | World colored heavyweight title claim at stake; (via KO only) |
| 35 | Win | 25–4–4 (2) | Sam McVea | PTS | 12 | Sep 7, 1915 | Atlas A.A., Boston, Massachusetts, U.S. | Won world colored heavyweight title claim |
| 34 | Win | 24–4–4 (2) | Battling Jim Johnson | NWS | 10 | Jul 5, 1915 | Sacandaga Park, Gloversville, New York, U.S. | |
| 33 | Loss | 23–4–4 (2) | Sam McVea | NWS | 10 | May 19, 1915 | St. Nicholas Arena, New York City, New York, U.S. | |
| 32 | Win | 23–3–4 (2) | John Lester Johnson | PTS | 20 | Mar 12, 1915 | Tommy Burns Arena, New Orleans, Louisiana, U.S. | |
| 31 | Loss | 22–3–4 (2) | Sam McVea | PTS | 20 | Dec 20, 1914 | McDonoghville Park, New Orleans, Louisiana, U.S. | |
| 30 | Loss | 22–2–4 (2) | Sam Langford | KO | 14 (20) | Nov 26, 1914 | Arena, Vernon, California, U.S. | For world colored heavyweight title |
| 29 | Win | 22–1–4 (2) | Jim Cameron | PTS | 4 | Oct 30, 1914 | Dreamland Rink, San Francisco, California, U.S. | |
| 28 | Win | 21–1–4 (2) | Charles Horn | KO | 1 (4) | Oct 16, 1914 | Dreamland Rink, San Francisco, California, U.S. | |
| 27 | Win | 20–1–4 (2) | Charles "Sailor" Grande | PTS | 4 | Oct 9, 1914 | Dreamland Rink, San Francisco, California, U.S. | |
| 26 | Win | 19–1–4 (2) | Charlie Miller | KO | 1 (4) | Sep 18, 1914 | Dreamland Rink, San Francisco, California, U.S. | |
| 25 | Win | 18–1–4 (2) | Willie Meehan | PTS | 4 | Sep 4, 1914 | Dreamland Rink, San Francisco, California, U.S. | |
| 24 | Win | 17–1–4 (2) | Battling Brandt | TKO | 4 (4) | Aug 21, 1914 | Pavilion Rink, San Francisco, California, U.S. | |
| 23 | Win | 16–1–4 (2) | Mexican Pete Everett | KO | 2 (?) | Aug 2, 1914 | Sonora, Sonora, Mexico | |
| 22 | Win | 15–1–4 (2) | Soldier Elder | KO | 1 (?) | Jul 4, 1914 | El Paso, Texas, U.S. | |
| 21 | Draw | 14–1–4 (2) | Joe Jennette | NWS | 10 | Jun 9, 1914 | National Baseball Park, New Orleans, Louisiana, U.S. | |
| 20 | Draw | 14–1–3 (2) | Sam Langford | NWS | 10 | May 1, 1914 | National Baseball Park, New Orleans, Louisiana, U.S. | World colored heavyweight title at stake; (via (KO) only) |
| 19 | Win | 14–1–2 (2) | Rough House Ware | KO | 10 (20) | Feb 7, 1914 | New Orleans, Louisiana, U.S. | Exact date unknown |
| 18 | Win | 13–1–2 (2) | George Kid Cotton | KO | 4 (10) | Jan 8, 1914 | Northside A.C., New Orleans, Louisiana, U.S. | |
| 17 | Win | 12–1–2 (2) | Jimmy Sullivan | KO | 1 (10) | Dec 9, 1913 | Northside A.C., New Orleans, Louisiana, U.S. | |
| 16 | Win | 11–1–2 (2) | George Kid Cotton | KO | 3 (10) | Oct 3, 1913 | Pelican Stadium, New Orleans, Louisiana, U.S. | |
| 15 | Draw | 10–1–2 (2) | Joe Jennette | PTS | 10 | Jul 1, 1913 | Northside A.C., New Orleans, Louisiana, U.S. | |
| 14 | Draw | 10–1–1 (2) | Jeff Clark | PTS | 10 | Jun 18, 1913 | New Orleans, Louisiana, U.S. | |
| 13 | Win | 10–1 (2) | Kid Brown | KO | 2 (?) | Feb 2, 1913 | New Orleans, Louisiana, U.S. | Exact date unknown |
| 12 | ND | 9–1 (2) | Jack Graves | ND | 10 | Jan 1, 1913 | United States of America | Date and location of this fight unknown |
| 11 | Win | 9–1 (1) | Jack Tholmer | KO | 5 (10) | Nov 20, 1912 | Northside A.C., New Orleans, Louisiana, U.S. | |
| 10 | ND | 8–1 (1) | Dave Mills | ND | 10 | Aug 13, 1912 | Elks Club, El Paso, Texas, U.S. | |
| 9 | Win | 8–1 | Kid Brown | KO | 6 (?) | May 5, 1912 | New Orleans, Louisiana, U.S. | Exact date unknown |
| 8 | Win | 7–1 | Ben Peden | KO | 3 (?) | Apr 4, 1912 | New Orleans, Louisiana, U.S. | Exact date unknown |
| 7 | Loss | 6–1 | George Kid Cotton | KO | 2 (10) | Feb 14, 1912 | Louisiana A.C., New Orleans, Louisiana, U.S. | |
| 6 | Win | 6–0 | Sam Collier | KO | 7 (?) | Feb 2, 1912 | New Orleans, Louisiana, U.S. | |
| 5 | Win | 5–0 | Harry Brown | KO | 2 (?) | Jan 1, 1912 | New Orleans, Louisiana, U.S. | Exact date unknown |
| 4 | Win | 4–0 | Nat Dewey | NWS | 10 | Oct 25, 1911 | Louisiana A.C., New Orleans, Louisiana, U.S. | |
| 3 | Win | 3–0 | Kid Navarro | KO | 1 (?) | Mar 1, 1911 | New Orleans, Louisiana, U.S. | Exact date unknown |
| 2 | Win | 2–0 | Battling Taylor | KO | 4 (?) | Feb 2, 1911 | Rock Island, Illinois, U.S. | Exact date unknown |
| 1 | Win | 1–0 | Casey White | KO | 4 (?) | Jan 2, 1911 | Chicago, Illinois, U.S. | Professional debut; Exact date unknown |

Awards and achievements
| Preceded by Sam Langford | World Colored Heavyweight Champion; May 1, 1914 – November 26, 1914 | Succeeded by Sam Langford |
| Preceded by Sam Langford | World Colored Heavyweight Champion; January 3, 1916 – February 11, 1916 | Succeeded by Sam Langford |
| Preceded by Sam Langford | World Colored Heavyweight Champion; April 14, 1918 – October 12, 1926 | Succeeded by George Godfrey; Won vacated title |
