= Pilkington (surname) =

Pilkington is a surname. Notable people with the surname include:

- Alan Pilkington (born c. 1964), British engineer and professor
- Alastair Pilkington (1920–1995), British industrialist
- Lieutenant-General Sir Andrew Pilkington (c.1776–1853), British Army officer
- Anthony Pilkington (born 1988), English footballer who has represented Ireland
- Brian Pilkington (footballer) (1933–2020), English footballer
- Brian Pilkington (illustrator) (born 1950), English-Icelandic illustrator and artist
- Charles Pilkington (cricketer, born 1837), English cricketer and clergyman
- Charles Pilkington (1850–1918), English alpinist and colliery engineer
- Charles Pilkington (cricketer, born 1876), English cricketer
- Charlie Pilkington (1897–1974), Irish-American professional boxer
- Dianne Pilkington (born 1975), English theatre actress and singer
- Danny Pilkington (born 1990), English footballer
- Declan Pilkington (born 1969), Irish sportsman
- Doris Pilkington Garimara (born Nugi Garimara, 1937–2014, also known as Doris Pilkington), Australian author
- Elliot Pilkington (1890–1945), English footballer
- Esther Pilkington, British performance artist
- Florian Pilkington-Miksa (1950–2021), drummer in the original line-up of the British rock group Curved Air
- Francis Pilkington (c. 1565–1638), English composer, lutenist and singer
- Frederick Thomas Pilkington (1832–1898), British architect
- George Pilkington (disambiguation), several people
- Harry Pilkington (1905–1983), British businessman and academic administrator
- Jackie Pilkington, Irish-American professional boxer
- James Pilkington (bishop) (1520–1576), Bishop of Durham
- Joel Pilkington (born 1984), English footballer
- Johnny Pilkington (born 1970), Irish sportsman
- Karl Pilkington (born 1972), English radio producer and personality
- Kevin Pilkington (born 1974), English footballer
- Konnor Pilkington (born 1997), American baseball player
- Laetitia Pilkington (c. 1709–1750), British poet
- Leonard Pilkington (1527–1599), English academic and clergyman
- Liam Pilkington (1894–1977), Irish activist
- Lorraine Pilkington (born 1975), Irish actress
- Luke Pilkington (born 1990), Australian football (soccer) player
- Mark Pilkington (golfer) (born 1978), Welsh professional golfer
- Mark Pilkington (writer) (born 1973), English writer
- Matthew Pilkington (1701–1774), Irish author of a standard text on painters which become known as Pilkington's Dictionary
- Mary Pilkington (née Mary Hopkins) (1766–1839), English novelist and poet
- Pat Pilkington (1928–2013), co-founder of Bristol Cancer Help Centre
- Peter Pilkington, Baron Pilkington of Oxenford (1933–2011), British politician
- Rachel Pilkington (born 1974), Irish actress
- Richard Pilkington (disambiguation), several people
- Robert Pilkington (politician, born 1870) (1870–1942), Irish politician who sat in the Western Australian Legislative Assembly and the British House of Commons
- Robert Pilkington (English MP) (c. 1560–1605), English politician
- Roger Pilkington (disambiguation), several people
- William Pilkington (architect) (1758–1848), English architect
