= Boxing in the 1920s =

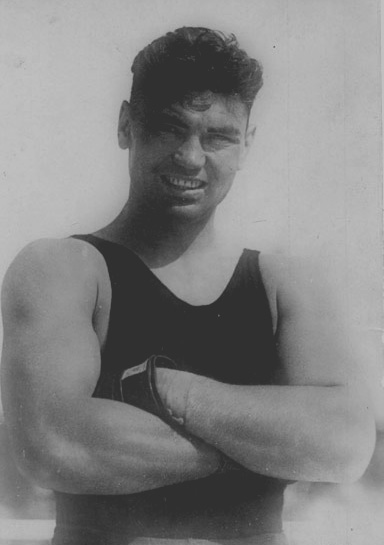
Irish-American professional boxer Jack Dempsey, world heavyweight champion from 1919 to 1926

Boxing in the 1920s was an exceptionally popular international sport. Many fights during this era, some 20 years away or so from the television era, were social events with many thousands in attendance, both men and women.

World heavyweight champion Jack Dempsey dominated the sport through much of the decade. He won the title in 1919, keeping it until 1926. He lost the title to Gene Tunney in 1926, but many of his fights were historic, such as his defenses against Georges Carpentier, Luis Firpo and Tom Gibbons, a fight which almost bankrupted the town of Shelby, Montana. His 1927 rematch against Tunney became known in boxing history as The Long Count Fight. Dempsey became a household name, and he dated and married Hollywood actresses. He was, along with Babe Ruth, Red Grange, Bill Tilden and Bobby Jones, one of the so-called Big Five of sports. Other important boxers included Benny Lynch (from western Scotland). Panama Al Brown was the first Hispanic to become a world champion.

Because airlines lacked the structured schedules of the modern days, many boxers had to make their way to important fights by train.

In 1921, the National Boxing Association was formed. It was the predecessor of what is known now as the WBA. Tex Rickard was the leading promoter of the day, and he has been compared to P.T. Barnum and Don King.

In 1920, the Walker Law was implemented, making professional boxing legal in the state of New York.

- July 5 – Benny Leonard knocked out of the ring in round 5 came back to knockout Charley White in the 9th round to retain the lightweight championship in Benton Harbor, Michigan.
- October 11 - Georges Carpentier Ko Battling Levinsky in the 4th round in New Jersey to win the Light Heavyweight Championship.
- December 14 - Jack Dempsey comes from behind to knockout Bill Brennan in the 12th round to retain his heavyweight championship in New York City.
- December 21 – Joe Lynch defeat Pete Herman via a 15-round decision in New York to become the bantamweight champion.

== 1921 ==
- January 14 – Benny Leonard retains the world Lightweight title with a sixth-round knockout of Richie Mitchell, at New York. Leonard suffered a first round knockdown, during which his mother fainted.
- February 7 – Jack Britton retains the world Welterweight title with a fifteen-round decision over Ted "Kid" Lewis, at New York.
- July 2 – In boxing's first million dollar fight in history, (and the year's most anticipated bout) Jack Dempsey retains the world Heavyweight championship with a fourth-round knockout over world Light-Heavyweight champion Georges Carpentier in Jersey City. The public paid an overall total of $1,789,238 at the ticket gates.
- July 25 – In a rematch of their 1920 bout, Pete Herman regains the world Bantamweight title with a fifteen-round decision over Joe Lynch, in New York.
- July 27 – Johnny Wilson retains the world Middleweight title with a seventh round disqualification win over William Bryan Downey, at Cleveland.

== 1922 ==
- February– John L. "Ike" Dorgan is a founding partner of The Ring magazine and remained with this influential publication until his retirement in 1930.
- February 10 – Benny Leonard retains his world Lightweight title, with a fifteen-round decision over Rocky Kansas, at New York.
- June 11 – Georges Carpentier retains his world Light-Heavyweight title with a first-round knockout of Ted Kid Lewis, in London.
- June 26 – Jack Britton retains his world Welterweight title with a thirteenth-round disqualification of Benny Leonard, at New York.
- September 24 – Battling Siki becomes Senegal's first world boxing champion, recuperating from several knockdowns to win the world Light-Heavyweight title by knocking out Georges Carpentier in six rounds at Paris, France. Siki also became Africa's first world Light-Heavyweight champion in the process.
- November 1 – Mickey "The Toy Bulldog" Walker becomes world Welterweight champion, defeating Jack Britton by a fifteen-round decision, at New York.

== 1923 ==
- March 17 – Mike McTigue of Ireland wins the world Light-Heavyweight title with a twenty-round decision over Battling Siki, in Dublin, Ireland.
- May 30 – Jack Bernstein wins the world Jr. Lightweight title with a fifteen-round decision over Johnny Dundee, at New York City.
- June 2 – French Eugene Criqui, who had sustained a shot on his mouth during World War I action, becomes the world Featherweight champion, beating Johnny Kilbane by a sixth-round knockout in New York. Doctors had told Criqui he would never fight again after he was shot.
- June 18 – Pancho Villa becomes the Philippines first world boxing champion in history, knocking out world Flyweight champion Jimmy Wilde in seven rounds, at New York.
- July 4 – In one of boxing's most economically disastrous fights, Jack Dempsey retained his world Heavyweight crown with a fifteen-round decision over Tommy Gibbons in Shelby, Montana. Dempsey's manager, Jack Kearns, had requested for the champion to be paid $300,000, an amount that the 2,000 residents of Shelby could barely come up with. As a result, Shelby was declared bankrupt at the time.
- July 23 – Benny Leonard retains the world Lightweight title with a fifteen-round decision over Lew Tendler in New York.
- September 14 – In one of boxing's most famous fights, Luis Firpo of Argentina comes within a second of becoming the first Hispanic world Heavyweight champion in history, dropping Jack Dempsey out of the ring and for a nine-second count, but Firpo is himself dropped ten times as Dempsey retains the crown with a second-round knockout, in New York.
- December 17 – Johnny Dundee recovers the world Jr. Lightweight title, with a fifteen-round decision over Jack Bernstein, in their New York rematch.

== 1924 ==
- January 18 – Edward Henry Greb, nicknamed Harry Greb regains the world Light-Heavyweight championship, with a fifteen-round unanimous decision over champion Johnny Wilson, at New York.
- March 21 – Abe Goldstein, a newspaper writer turned boxer, wins the world Bantamweight title, with a fifteen-round decision over Joe Lynch, at New York.
- June 2 – Mickey Walker retains the world Welterweight title, with a ten-round decision over Lew Tendler, in Philadelphia.
- August 1 – world Lightweight champion Benny Leonard fights to a ten-round no-decision with Pat Moran in a non-title bout at New York in what would be, at his mother's request, his last fight until 1931.

== 1925 ==
- May 1 – In what would turn out to be his last victory, Pancho Villa retains the world Flyweight title with a fifteen-round decision over Clever Sencio, in Manila, Philippines.
- July 2 – Harry Greb retains the world Middleweight title with a fifteen-round decision against world Welterweight champion Mickey Walker, in New York.
- July 4 – Fighting with an ulcerated tooth (without knowledge of the extense of his illness), Pancho Villa drops a ten-round decision to Jimmy McLarnin in New York.
- July 14 – Pancho Villa passes away from blood poisoning, in New York.
- August 27 – Louis Kaplan retains the world Bantamweight title with a fifteen-round draw (tie) against Babe Herman, in Waterbury.
- December 18 – Louis Kaplan and Babe Herman fight for the second time of the year, with Kaplan retaining the world Bantamweight title with a fifteen-round decision, at New York.

== 1926 ==
- September 23 – After seven years at the top, Heavyweight champion Jack Dempsey is defeated by top contender Gene Tunney
- October 12 – Jack Sharkey hands out a beating to Harry Wills until Wills gets himself disqualified in round 13 for excessive holding in Brooklyn, New York

== 1927 ==
- September 22 – Heavyweight champion Gene Tunney again defeats contender Jack Dempsey in the famous battle known as The Long Count Fight.
- October 7 – Light Heavyweight Champion of the World Mike McTigue is defeated by top contender Tommy Loughran.
- December 12 – Light Heavyweight Champion Tommy Loughran defeats Jimmy Slattery for the NBA Light Heavyweight Championship of the World.

== 1928 ==
- July 31 – In an unprecedented move, Heavyweight Champion Gene Tunney retires from the ring, vacating the Heavyweight title after defeating Tom Heeney. Unlike James Jeffries before him, Tunney never returned to the ring.
- September 26 – The National Boxing Association Heavyweight championship's vacancy is filled when Jack Sharkey defeats Tommy Loughran to take the title. Sharkey's title was not universally recognized, and in 1930 he would be defeated by Max Schmeling for the undisputed championship.

== 1929 ==
- March 28 – Tommy Loughran defeats Mickey Walker via a 10-round decision in Chicago, Illinois to keep his light-heavyweight championship.
- September – Tommy Loughran, undefeated light-heavyweight champion of the world, relinquished the title to fight as a heavyweight.
- December 20 – At New York's Madison Square Garden, Benny Bass knocked out Tod Morton of Seattle to win the junior lightweight title.
