= Charles Pilkington =

Charles Pilkington may refer to:

- Charles Pilkington (cricketer, born 1837) (1837–1900), English cricketer and clergyman
- Charles Pilkington (mountaineer) (1850–1918), English alpinist and colliery engineer
- Charles Pilkington (cricketer, born 1876) (1876–1950), English cricketer
- Charlie Pilkington (1897–1974), American boxer
