= Jackie Pilkington =

American boxer

Personal information
- Nickname: "Irish"
- Nationality: (United States) American
- Born: New York City
- Weight: Lightweight

Boxing career

Boxing record
- Total fights: 98
- Wins: 43
- Win by KO: 6
- Losses: 33
- Draws: 13

Jackie Pilkington (born in New York City), known as Irish Jackie Pilkington, was a professional boxer in the Lightweight division.

== Background ==
Pilkington was born in New York City to Irish American parents. After the death of his widowed mother in 1919, his older brother Charlie Pilkington moved the entire family to Meriden, Connecticut. Jackie started boxing there in 1924 at the West Side Athletic Club after his brother had left to box in Australia.

== Professional career ==
During his career, Pilkington actively participated in boxing matches in the New York City, Hartford, and New Haven boxing circuits.

Shortly after Jackie began boxing in the professional leagues, his older brother took him to Australia, where he fought five bouts in 1927.

In 1930, Pilkington boxed for the Connecticut state title against Bobby Mays in a match set up by the famous manager, Al Weill. Unfortunately, Pilkington lost the match at the Thames Arena in New London.

In 1931, Pilkington fought his brother's forming sparring partner, featherweight champion Kid Kaplan in Hartford for the New England Lightweight Championship, losing the match to Kaplan in a 10 round match.

Over the course of his career, Pilkington fought Benny Bass, Billy Wallace, Georgie Day, and Johnny Dundee - who Pilkington beat in a 10 round match.

== See also ==
- List of people from Harlem
