= Roger Pilkington =

Roger Pilkington may refer to:

- Several Rogers in the Pilkington family
- Roger de Pilkington, Member of Parliament (MP) for Lancashire in 1316
- Roger Pilkington (MP) (died 1407), MP for Lancashire in 1384
- Roger Pilkington (collector) (died 1969), British collector of Chinese ceramics
- Roger Pilkington (writer) (died 2003), British author and biologist
