= Shelby Town Hall =

- U.S. National Register of Historic Places
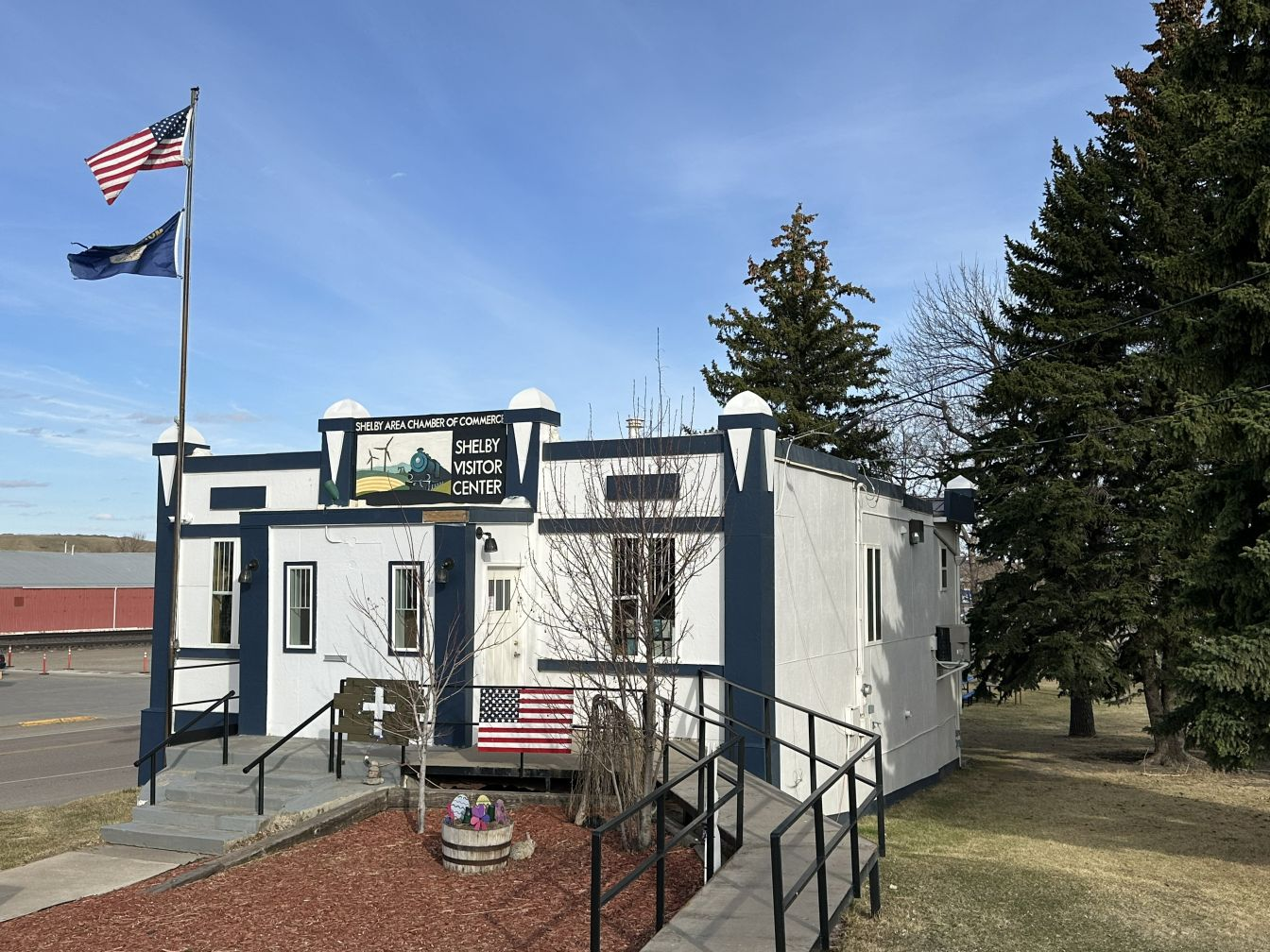

- Location within Montana Location within the United States
- Location: 100 Montana Ave., Shelby, Montana
- Coordinates: 48°30′16″N 111°51′15″W
- Area: less than one acre
- Built: 1923
- Architect: Bossout, Frank; Humphrey, J.P.
- Architectural style: Bungalow/craftsman
- NRHP reference No.: 06000040
- Added to NRHP: February 14, 2006

The Shelby Town Hall in Shelby, Montana is a former town hall building which was built in 1923. It was listed on the National Register of Historic Places in 2006. It is used by the Shelby Chamber of Commerce and as a Visitor Information Center.

The building was built in just two months in 1923, with expectation it would be the media headquarters for coverage of the 4th of July "World Heavyweight Championship Fight" between Jack Dempsey and Tommy Gibbons.
