= Robert Pilkington =

Robert Pilkington may refer to:

- Robert Pilkington (politician, born 1870) (1870–1942), Irish politician who sat in the Western Australian Legislative Assembly and the British House of Commons
- Robert Pilkington (English MP) (c. 1560–1605), English politician

== See also ==
- Pilkington of Lancashire, for other people called Robert Pilkington
