= Babe Herman (boxer) =

American boxer (1902–1966)

Babe Herman (April 15, 1902 – 1966) was an American featherweight boxer.

Born as Herman J. Sousa in Sacramento, California, he stood 5' 4". His record was 91 (KO 23) wins + 45 (KO 9) losses + 19 draws.

On December 18, 1925, he challenged Kid Kaplan for the featherweight title at Madison Square Garden, losing in a fifteen-round decision.

His managers were Jack Kearns, Dan McKetrick, and Fred Pearl. He boxed a total of 1269 rounds in a total 167 bouts.
