= Eddie Campagnuolo =

American boxer

Personal information
- Nickname: "Eddie Compo"
- Nationality: American
- Born: Edward Campagnuolo; January 4, 1927 New Haven, Connecticut
- Died: January 3, 1998 (aged 70) Lake Worth, Florida
- Height: 5 ft 4 in (163 cm)
- Weight: Featherweight

Boxing career

Boxing record
- Wins: 74
- Win by KO: 13

Eddie Campagnuolo, alias Eddie Compo, alias Edward Campagnuolo (January 4, 1927, or September 27 – January 3, 1998), was an American featherweight professional boxer from Connecticut.

== Personal life ==
Eddie Campagnuolo was a native of New Haven, Connecticut. According to a 1951 Topps sports card, his birth date was January 4, 1927, but according to his Social Security Death Index listing, he was born on September 27, 1928, in New Haven, Connecticut, and died on January 3, 1998, in Lake Worth, Palm Beach, Florida. A graduate of Hill House High School in his home town, he worked as a caddy, delivery boy, and newsboy before going into boxing. Prior to his death, he lived in West Palm Beach, Florida.

== Professional career ==
Campagnuolo was a small (5'4") featherweight, and not a big puncher. But beginning with his professional debut at the age of 17 in August 1944, Campagnuolo ran of a string of 25 consecutive wins in less than two years. By September 1949, Campagnuolo had run his record to an impressive 57-1-3. It was then that he met the great Willie Pep in a bout for the world featherweight championship and lost by TKO in the 7th round. Campagnuolo fought until April 1955, then retired at the relatively young age of 28 years, having lost three of his last four fights.

Campagnuolo was trained by former New York and Connecticut featherweight pro Charlie Pilkington.

Campagnuolo's final record was 74 wins (13 by knockout) and 10 losses with 4 draws.
