= Jack Dempsey vs. Tommy Gibbons =

Boxing match

- Date: July 4, 1923
- Venue: Arena, Shelby, Montana, U.S.
- Title(s) on the line: NBA, NYSAC, and The Ring undisputed heavyweight championship

Tale of the tape
Boxer	Jack Dempsey	Tommy Gibbons
Nickname	"The Manassa Mauler"	
Hometown	Manassa, Colorado, U.S.	Saint Paul, Minnesota, U.S.
Purse	$255,000	$7,500
Pre-fight record	60–4–9 (6) (50 KO)	44–2–1 (44) (37 KO)
Age	28 years	32 years, 3 months
Height	6 ft 1 in (185 cm)	6 ft 1/2 in (184 cm)
Weight	188 lb (85 kg)	175 1/2 lb (80 kg)
Style	Orthodox	Orthodox
Recognition	NBA, NYSAC and The Ring undisputed Heavyweight Champion	

Result
- Dempsey defeats Gibbons by unanimous decision

Jack Dempsey vs. Tommy Gibbons was a professional boxing match contested on July 4, 1923, for the undisputed heavyweight championship.

== Background ==
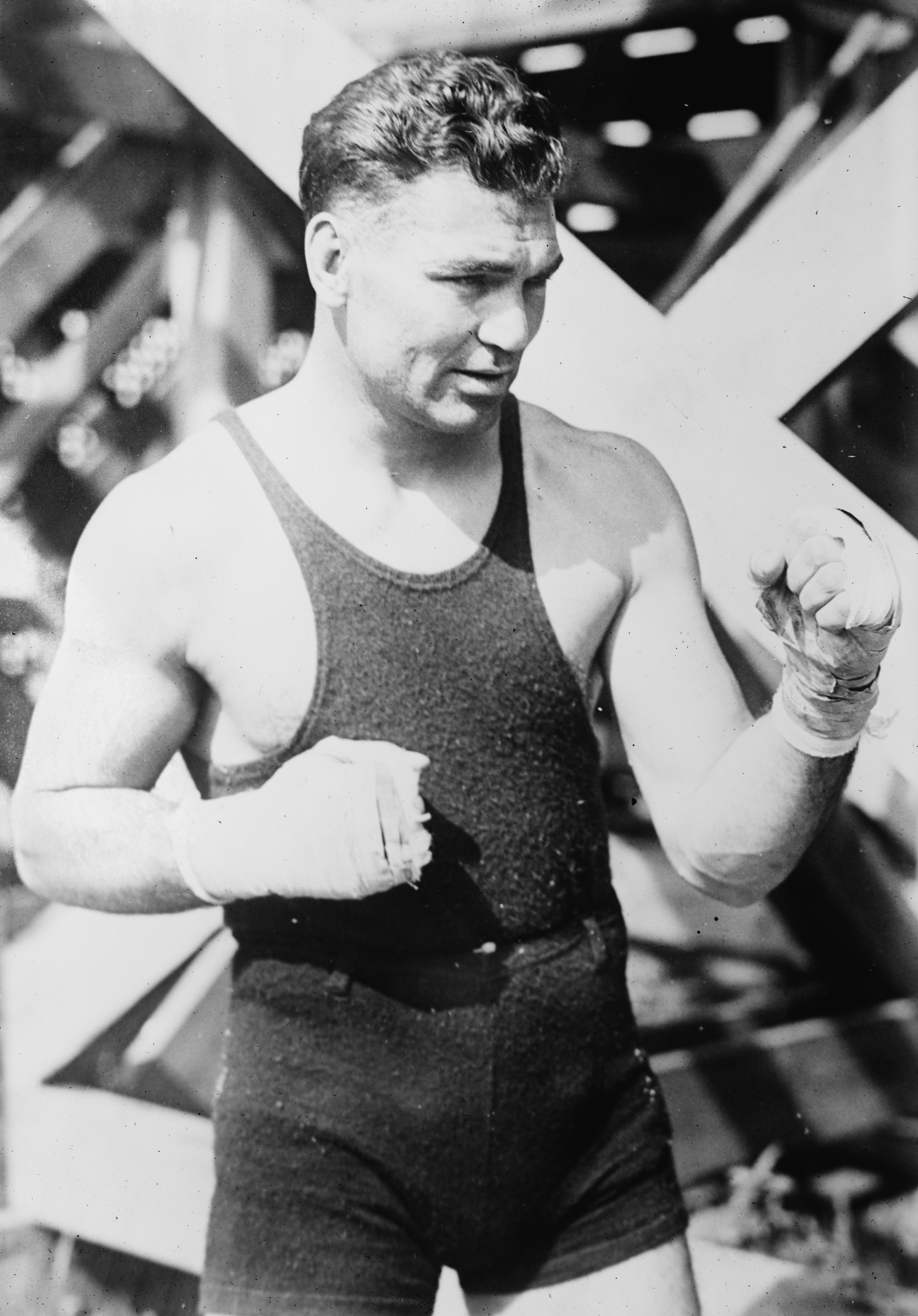
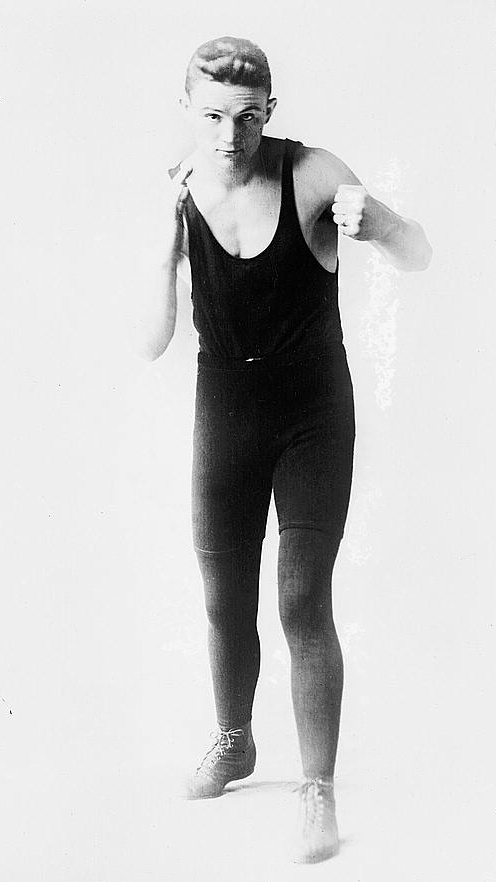
Jack Dempsey (left), Tommy Gibbons (right)

In 1922, the discovery of oil in Shelby, Montana, presented an opportunity for the city to become a thriving economic and tourist hub in northern Montana. To capitalize on the oil revenues, town officials devised a plan to attract visitors and families by hosting high-profile events. The first of these events was a world heavyweight boxing title fight, featuring the regaining champion Jack Dempsey. Dempsey, known for his aggressive fighting style, had a history of delivering knockouts, having previously defeated Jess Willard, Bill Brennan and Georges Carpentier among others, had however been out of the ring since July 1921.

Officials believed that Dempsey's nationwide fame, combined with the reputation of his manager, Jack Kearns, and promoter, Tex Rickard, would draw a large crowd to Shelby. The city chose Tommy Gibbons, brother of former world champion Mike Gibbons, as the challenger. However, Gibbons' relative obscurity among the general public would ultimately contribute to the event's failure.

To secure the fight, Shelby officials agreed to meet the demands of both fighters and their teams. Kearns required an advance for travel costs and a guaranteed purse for Dempsey, citing the lengthy train journey from populous areas. Gibbons also received a significant payment of $150,000 to participate. Local banks provided the necessary funds, and officials were optimistic about the event's success.

The fight was scheduled for July 4, Independence Day, and a large arena was constructed on a farm, now known as Champion's Field. When Dempsey arrived by train, he was greeted by thousands of residents, further fueling the officials' hopes for a successful event.

== The fight ==
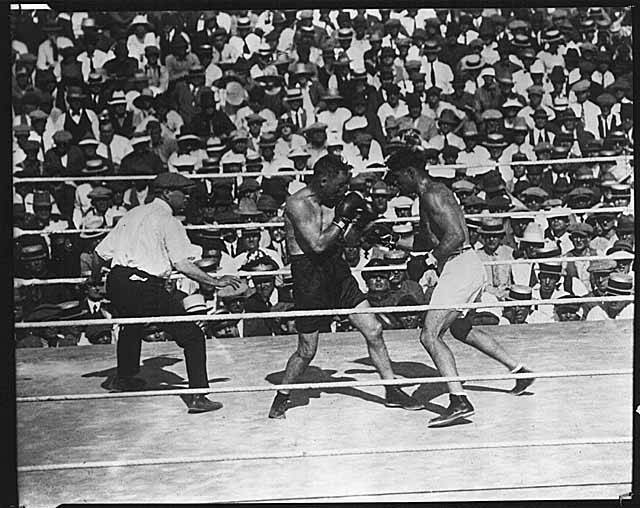
Jack Dempsey (right, with white shorts) and Tommy Gibbons in their boxing match, Shelby, Montana, July 4, 1923 (MOHAI 1324)

The fight against Gibbons proved to be a more tactical and cautious affair. Dempsey focused his attacks on Gibbons' head, while Gibbons targeted Dempsey's body. This approach allowed Gibbons to evade many of Dempsey's punches, but Dempsey's agility made it challenging for Gibbons to land effective shots on his stomach and ribs.

Although the fight was largely strategic, there were brief moments of intensity. In the seventh round, Dempsey reportedly hurt Gibbons, but was unable to secure a knockout. On occasion, Gibbons landed solid punches on Dempsey's chin, but Dempsey was able to shrug them off.

Ultimately, Dempsey's superior skill and agility paid off, as he retained his title with a unanimous decision after the full 15 rounds. The fight, although not as action-packed as expected, showcased the tactical skills of both fighters.

== Aftermath ==
The highly anticipated match ended in disaster for the town of Shelby. Despite the construction of a large arena, capable of holding a crowd the size of a football field, the event failed to attract a significant number of paying fans. The high ticket prices proved to be a major deterrent, with only 7,702 people attending the fight. In contrast, approximately 13,000 individuals watched the match for free.

The economic consequences of the failed event were severe. In the months that followed, four banks in Shelby went bankrupt, and the town's aspirations for prosperity were left in tatters. The financial struggles were further exacerbated by two subsequent rodeos, the Shelby Stampede and the Marias Fair and Rodeo, which also failed to generate significant revenue.

The Shelby Stampede, produced by the Knight and Day Stampede Company from Alberta, took place in the world's largest rodeo arena, which had a seating capacity of 20,000 people. However, despite its grand scale, the event was not financially successful. The arena was eventually torn down after the crowds departed. The Marias Fair and Rodeo, held on the opposite side of town, suffered a similar fate.

=== Legacy ===
The town hall building, constructed in just two months to serve as the media headquarters for the event which still stands today and is listed on the National Register of Historic Places.

== Undercard ==
Confirmed bouts:

Preceded by vs. Georges Carpentier	Jack Dempsey's bouts 4 July 1923	Succeeded by vs. Luis Ángel Firpo
Preceded by vs. Chuck Wiggins	Tommy Gibbons's bouts 4 July 1923	Succeeded by vs. Jack Moore
