= Robert Pilkington (English MP) =

English politician (ca. 1560 – 1605)

Robert Pilkington (ca. 1560 – 1605), of Rivington, Lancashire and Gray's Inn, London, was an English politician.

He was a member (MP) of the parliament of England for Clitheroe in 1589.

Born as the eldest child of George Pilkington of the Pilkington Family of Rivington in Lancashire he inherited the Manor of Rivington on his father's death, his Uncle James Pilkington became the first Church of England Bishop of Durham.
