= Roger Pilkington (collector) =

Collector of Chinese ceramics

Roger Pilkington (1928 — 1969) was a collector of Chinese ceramics and a member of the Pilkington glass-making family.
