= Tommy Gibbons =

American boxer

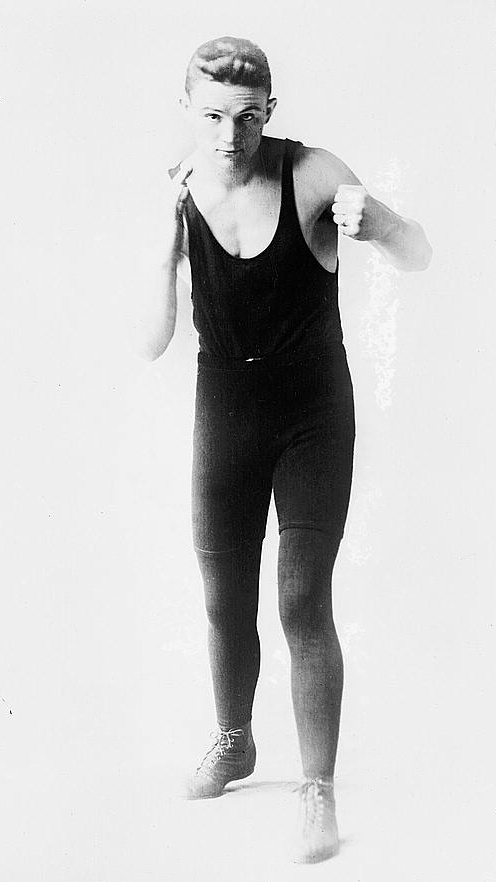

Personal information
- Born: Thomas Joseph Gibbons; March 22, 1891 Saint Paul, Minnesota, U.S.
- Died: November 19, 1960 (aged 69)
- Weight: Heavyweight

Boxing career
- Stance: Orthodox

Boxing record
- Total fights: 106; with the inclusion of newspaper decisions
- Wins: 96
- Win by KO: 48
- Losses: 5
- Draws: 4
- No contests: 1

Thomas Joseph Gibbons (March 22, 1891 – November 19, 1960) was an American professional heavyweight boxer.

== Life and career ==
He was born on March 22, 1891, in Saint Paul, Minnesota, to Thomas John Gibbons and Mary (née Burke) Gibbons. He had a brother, Mike.

Tommy started boxing professionally in 1911 as a middleweight. Like his brother he was a master scientific boxer who chose to outbox his opponents. In time, he advanced to the heavyweight boxing class and developed a respectable punch.

On May 27, 1916, he married Helen Constance Moga in Saint Paul, Minnesota.

His biggest fight came near the end of his career in Jack Dempsey vs. Tommy Gibbons when he met heavyweight champion Jack Dempsey on July 4, 1923, in Shelby, Montana. The local backers and the town of Shelby went broke putting on the fight. The great Dempsey battled through the full fifteen rounds before winning by decision. Dempsey was awarded $200,000, whereas Gibbons received expense money.

Tommy Gibbons record was 56-4-1 with 44 no decisions, and 1 no contest. He scored 48 knockouts, and was stopped only once by Gene Tunney on June 5, 1925. The names dotting his record read like boxing's hall of fame. Tommy recorded wins over George Chip, Willie Meehan, Billy Miske, Chuck Wiggins, Jack Bloomfield, and Kid Norfolk. Tommy had no decision matches with George "K.O." Brown, Billy Miske, Harry Greb, Battling Levinsky, Bob Roper, Chuck Wiggins, Georges Carpentier, and others. Only Harry Greb, Billy Miske, Jack Dempsey, and Gene Tunney were able to score wins over Gibbons.

Following his retirement from boxing, Tommy Gibbons was elected four times as the Sheriff of Ramsey County. He won for six consecutive four year terms before retiring at the age of 68. He died on November 19, 1960, in Saint Paul, Minnesota.

== Legacy ==
Gibbons became a member of the Ring Boxing Hall of Fame in 1963, and the International Boxing Hall of Fame in 1993, and the Minnesota Boxing Hall of Fame in 2010.

== Professional boxing record ==
All information in this section is derived from BoxRec, unless otherwise stated.

=== Official record ===
106 fights	57 wins	3 losses
By knockout	48	1
By decision	8	2
By disqualification	1	0
Draws	1	
No contests	1	
Newspaper decisions/draws	44	

All newspaper decisions are officially regarded as “no decision” bouts and are not counted in the win/loss/draw column.

No.	Result	Record	Opponent	Type	Round	Date	Age	Location	Notes
106	Loss	56–4–1 (45)	Gene Tunney	KO	12 (15)	Jun 5, 1925	33 years, 75 days	Polo Grounds, New York City, New York, U.S.	
105	Win	56–3–1 (45)	Tiny Jim Herman	KO	3 (10)	Jan 30, 1925	32 years, 314 days	Detroit, Michigan, U.S.	
104	Win	55–3–1 (45)	Jack Burke	TKO	6 (10)	Jan 7, 1925	32 years, 291 days	Grand Rapids, Michigan, U.S.	
103	Win	54–3–1 (45)	Kid Norfolk	TKO	6 (15)	Dec 9, 1924	33 years, 262 days	Madison Square Garden, New York City, New York, U.S.	
102	Win	53–3–1 (45)	Ted Jamieson	KO	1 (15)	Oct 24, 1924	33 years, 216 days	Coliseum Arena, New Orleans, Louisiana, U.S.	
101	Win	52–3–1 (45)	Bill Reed	TKO	3 (20)	Oct 10, 1924	33 years, 202 days	Bellaire, Ohio, U.S.	
100	Win	51–3–1 (45)	Jack Bloomfield	KO	3 (20)	Aug 9, 1924	33 years, 140 days	Wembley Stadium, Wembley, London, England, U.K.	
99	Win	50–3–1 (45)	Georges Carpentier	NWS	10	May 31, 1924	33 years, 70 days	Floyd Fitzsimmons' Arena, Michigan City, Indiana, U.S.	
98	Win	50–3–1 (44)	Jack McFarland	KO	2 (8)	Apr 3, 1924	33 years, 12 days	Nashville Baseball Park, Nashville, Tennessee, U.S.	
97	Win	49–3–1 (44)	Soldier Lee	TKO	3 (8)	Mar 31, 1924	33 years, 9 days	Memphis, Tennessee, U.S.	
96	Win	48–3–1 (44)	Joe Downey	KO	1 (12)	Mar 24, 1924	33 years, 2 days	Lakeside Park Pavillion, Dayton, Ohio, U.S.	
95	Win	47–3–1 (44)	Jack Moore	KO	2 (10)	Mar 14, 1924	32 years, 358 days	Board of Trade Building, Winnipeg, Manitoba, Canada	
94	Loss	46–3–1 (44)	Jack Dempsey	PTS	15	Jul 4, 1923	32 years, 104 days	Arena, Shelby, Montana, U.S.	For NYSAC, NBA, and The Ring heavyweight titles
93	Win	46–2–1 (44)	Chuck Wiggins	TKO	10 (15)	Apr 30, 1923	32 years, 39 days	Coliseum Arena, New Orleans, Louisiana, U.S.	
92	Win	45–2–1 (44)	Andy Schmader	KO	1 (10)	Mar 26, 1923	32 years, 4 days	Majestic Theatre, Peoria, Illinois, U.S.	
91	Win	44–2–1 (44)	Jim Tracey	KO	2 (10)	Mar 5, 1923	31 years, 348 days	East Chicago, Indiana, U.S.	
90	Win	43–2–1 (44)	Billy Miske	UD	10	Dec 15, 1922	31 years, 268 days	Auditorium, Saint Paul, Minnesota, U.S.	
89	Win	42–2–1 (44)	Joe Burke	KO	1 (10)	Dec 11, 1922	31 years, 264 days	Broadway Auditorium, Buffalo, New York, U.S.	
88	Win	41–2–1 (44)	George Ashe	KO	1 (10)	Nov 13, 1922	31 years, 236 days	Danceland Arena, Detroit, Michigan, U.S.	
87	Loss	40–2–1 (44)	Billy Miske	DQ	10 (15)	Oct 13, 1922	31 years, 205 days	Madison Square Garden, New York City, New York, U.S.	
86	Win	40–1–1 (44)	Sailor Martin	KO	2 (12)	May 29, 1922	31 years, 68 days	Broadway Bowl, Louisville, Kentucky, U.S.	
85	Win	39–1–1 (44)	Harry Foley	TKO	6 (15)	May 1, 1922	31 years, 40 days	Louisiana Auditorium, New Orleans, Louisiana, U.S.	
84	Loss	38–1–1 (44)	Harry Greb	UD	15	Mar 13, 1922	30 years, 356 days	Madison Square Garden, New York City, New York, U.S.	
83	Win	38–0–1 (44)	Pat McCarthy	TKO	4 (10)	Feb 2, 1922	30 years, 317 days	Mechanics Building, Boston, Massachusetts, U.S.	
82	Win	37–0–1 (44)	Bartley Madden	NWS	10	Dec 19, 1921	30 years, 272 days	Grand Rapids, Michigan, U.S.	
81	Win	37–0–1 (43)	Hope Mullen	KO	1 (15)	Dec 2, 1921	30 years, 255 days	Southern AC, Shreveport, Louisiana, U.S.	
80	Win	36–0–1 (43)	Dan O'Dowd	KO	6 (15)	Nov 25, 1921	30 years, 248 days	Louisiana Auditorium, New Orleans, Louisiana, U.S.	
79	Win	35–0–1 (43)	Soldier Jones	KO	1 (10)	Nov 16, 1921	30 years, 239 days	Armouries, Windsor, Ontario, Canada	
78	Win	34–0–1 (43)	Fred Allen	TKO	1 (12)	Oct 14, 1921	30 years, 206 days	Odeon Theater, Saint Louis, Missouri, U.S.	
77	Win	33–0–1 (43)	Clay Turner	KO	1 (10)	Oct 7, 1921	30 years, 199 days	Broadway Auditorium, Buffalo, New York, U.S.	
76	Win	32–0–1 (43)	Joe Burke	KO	2 (10)	Sep 20, 1921	30 years, 182 days	Kalamazoo, Michigan, U.S.	
75	Win	31–0–1 (43)	Bill Reed	TKO	2 (10)	Sep 12, 1921	30 years, 174 days	Redland Field, Cincinnati, Ohio, U.S.	
74	Win	30–0–1 (43)	Dan O'Dowd	TKO	3 (10)	Sep 5, 1921	30 years, 167 days	South Bend, Indiana, U.S.	
73	Win	29–0–1 (43)	Willie Meehan	TKO	1 (12)	Jun 22, 1921	30 years, 92 days	Dunn Field, Cleveland, Ohio, U.S.	
72	Win	28–0–1 (43)	Willie Keeler	KO	2 (10)	Jun 7, 1921	30 years, 77 days	Omaha, Nebraska, U.S.	
71	Win	27–0–1 (43)	Jack Clifford	KO	3 (12)	May 30, 1921	30 years, 69 days	Ebbets Field, New York City, New York, U.S.	
70	Win	26–0–1 (43)	Sergeant Ray Smith	KO	2 (12)	May 27, 1921	30 years, 66 days	Idora Park, Youngstown, Ohio, U.S.	
69	Win	25–0–1 (43)	Jack Heinen	KO	1 (12)	May 23, 1921	30 years, 62 days	Canton Auditorium, Canton, Ohio, U.S.	
68	Win	24–0–1 (43)	Hugh Walker	TKO	2 (10)	Apr 29, 1921	30 years, 38 days	Grand Opera House, Terre Haute, Pennsylvania, U.S.	
67	Win	23–0–1 (43)	Porky Dan Flynn	TKO	11 (12)	Apr 19, 1921	30 years, 28 days	Coliseum, Newark, New Jersey, U.S.	
66	Win	22–0–1 (43)	Larry Williams	TKO	4 (12)	Apr 12, 1921	30 years, 21 days	Pioneer Sporting Club, New York City, New York, U.S.	
65	Win	21–0–1 (43)	Sergeant Norcross	KO	1 (12)	Mar 31, 1921	30 years, 9 days	Springfield, Ohio, U.S.	
64	Win	20–0–1 (43)	Paul Samson Koerner	TKO	2 (15)	Mar 22, 1921	30 years, 0 days	Pioneer Sporting Club, New York City, New York, U.S.	
63	Win	19–0–1 (43)	Al Reich	KO	1 (10)	Mar 18, 1921	29 years, 361 days	Cleveland, Ohio, U.S.	
62	Win	18–0–1 (43)	Hugh Walker	NWS	10	Feb 14, 1921	29 years, 329 days	Heuck's Opera House, Cincinnati, Ohio, U.S.	
61	Win	18–0–1 (42)	Tony Melchior	KO	1 (12)	Feb 10, 1921	29 years, 325 days	Coliseum, Toledo, Ohio, U.S.	
60	Win	17–0–1 (42)	Chuck Wiggins	NWS	10	Jan 11, 1921	29 years, 295 days	Heuck's Opera House, Cincinnati, Ohio, U.S.	
59	Win	17–0–1 (41)	Chuck Wiggins	NWS	12	Dec 6, 1920	29 years, 259 days	Coliseum, Toledo, Ohio, U.S.	
58	Win	17–0–1 (40)	Hugh Walker	NWS	10	Nov 11, 1920	29 years, 234 days	Peoria, Illinois, U.S.	
57	Loss	17–0–1 (39)	Harry Greb	NWS	10	Jul 31, 1920	29 years, 131 days	Forbes Field, Pittsburgh, Pennsylvania, U.S.	
56	Win	17–0–1 (38)	Clay Turner	NWS	10	Jul 22, 1920	29 years, 122 days	Nicollet Park, Minneapolis, Minnesota, U.S.	
55	Win	17–0–1 (37)	Harry Greb	NWS	10	May 15, 1920	29 years, 54 days	Forbes Field, Pittsburgh, Pennsylvania, U.S.	
54	Win	17–0–1 (36)	Bob Roper	NWS	10	Apr 9, 1920	29 years, 18 days	Armory, Minneapolis, Minnesota, U.S.	
53	Win	17–0–1 (35)	Jack Reeves	KO	2 (15)	Feb 19, 1920	28 years, 334 days	Edmonton, Alberta, Canada	
52	Draw	16–0–1 (35)	Noel "Boy" McCormick	PTS	10	Feb 11, 1920	28 years, 326 days	Arena, Milwaukie, Oregon, U.S.	
51	Win	16–0 (35)	George K.O. Brown	NWS	10	Feb 2, 1920	28 years, 317 days	Peoria, Illinois, U.S.	
50	Win	16–0 (34)	Jimmy Darcy	PTS	10	Dec 16, 1919	28 years, 269 days	Arena, Milwaukie, Oregon, U.S.	
49	Win	15–0 (34)	Frank Farmer	PTS	6	Dec 3, 1919	28 years, 256 days	Crystal Pool, Seattle, Washington, U.S.	
48	Win	14–0 (34)	Mick King	PTS	15	Nov 27, 1919	28 years, 250 days	Victoria Pavilion, Calgary, Alberta, Canada	
47	Win	13–0 (34)	George K.O. Brown	NWS	12	Jul 3, 1919	28 years, 103 days	Denver, Colorado, U.S.	
46	Draw	13–0 (33)	Billy Miske	NWS	10	Jun 19, 1919	28 years, 89 days	Nicollet Park, Minneapolis, Minnesota, U.S.	
45	Win	13–0 (32)	Tom Roper	NWS	10	Apr 28, 1919	28 years, 37 days	Waterloo Theatre, Waterloo, Iowa, U.S.	
44	Win	13–0 (31)	George Chip	PTS	10	Apr 10, 1919	28 years, 19 days	Stockyards Stadium, Denver, Colorado, U.S.	
43	Win	12–0 (31)	Larry Williams	NWS	10	Feb 10, 1919	27 years, 325 days	Broadway Auditorium, Buffalo, New York City, New York, U.S.	
42	Win	12–0 (30)	Len Rowlands	NWS	10	Jan 30, 1919	27 years, 314 days	Town Hall, Scranton, Pennsylvania, U.S.	
41	NC	12–0 (29)	Bartley Madden	NC	4 (6)	Jan 25, 1919	27 years, 309 days	National A.C., Philadelphia, Pennsylvania, U.S.	
40	Win	12–0 (28)	George Chip	NWS	12	May 3, 1918	27 years, 42 days	Coliseum, Des Moines, Iowa, U.S.	
39	Win	12–0 (27)	Gus Christie	PTS	10	Apr 26, 1918	27 years, 35 days	Terre Haute, Pennsylvania, U.S.	
38	Win	11–0 (27)	Silent Martin	NWS	15	Apr 20, 1918	27 years, 29 days	Armory, Akron, Ohio, U.S.	
37	Win	11–0 (26)	Clay Turner	NWS	10	Apr 18, 1918	27 years, 27 days	Town Hall, Scranton, Pennsylvania, U.S.	
36	Win	11–0 (25)	Gus Christie	NWS	12	Mar 22, 1918	27 years, 0 days	Coliseum, Des Moines, Iowa, U.S.	
35	Win	11–0 (24)	Silent Martin	KO	10 (15)	Mar 13, 1918	26 years, 356 days	Albaugh Theater, Baltimore, Maryland, U.S.	
34	Win	10–0 (24)	George Chip	NWS	10	Mar 7, 1918	26 years, 350 days	Town Hall, Scranton, Pennsylvania, U.S.	
33	Win	10–0 (23)	Clay Turner	NWS	10	Feb 11, 1918	26 years, 326 days	Southside Market House, Pittsburgh, Pennsylvania, U.S.	
32	Win	10–0 (22)	Gus Christie	NWS	10	Feb 4, 1918	26 years, 319 days	Southside Market House, Pittsburgh, Pennsylvania, U.S.	
31	Win	10–0 (21)	Gus Christie	PTS	15	Sep 3, 1917	26 years, 165 days	Dayton, Ohio, U.S.	
30	Win	9–0 (21)	George Chip	NWS	10	Aug 22, 1917	26 years, 153 days	Auditorium, Saint Paul, Minnesota, U.S.	
29	Win	9–0 (20)	Battling Levinsky	NWS	10	Mar 23, 1917	26 years, 1 day	Auditorium, Saint Paul, Minnesota, U.S.	World light heavyweight title at stake; (via KO only)
28	Win	9–0 (19)	Jackie Clark	NWS	10	Mar 15, 1917	25 years, 358 days	Town Hall, Scranton, Pennsylvania, U.S.	
27	Win	9–0 (18)	Bert Kenny	NWS	10	Mar 3, 1917	25 years, 346 days	Fairmont A.C., New York City, New York, U.S.	
26	Win	9–0 (17)	Bob Moha	NWS	10	Feb 6, 1917	25 years, 321 days	Elite Rink, Milwaukee, Wisconsin, U.S.	
25	Win	9–0 (16)	Joe Herrick	NWS	12	Nov 16, 1916	25 years, 239 days	Winnipeg, Manitoba, Canada	
24	Win	9–0 (15)	Joe Herrick	NWS	12	Oct 27, 1916	25 years, 219 days	Walker Theatre, Winnipeg, Manitoba, Canada	
23	Win	9–0 (14)	Vic Hansen	PTS	10	Mar 8, 1916	24 years, 352 days	Saint Joseph, Missouri	
22	Win	8–0 (14)	Gus Christie	NWS	12	Feb 15, 1916	24 years, 330 days	Winnipeg, Manitoba, Canada	
21	Win	8–0 (13)	Harry Greb	NWS	10	Nov 16, 1915	24 years, 239 days	Auditorium, Saint Paul, Minnesota, U.S.	
20	Win	8–0 (12)	Billy Miske	NWS	10	Jul 12, 1915	24 years, 112 days	Auditorium, Saint Paul, Minnesota, U.S.	
19	Win	8–0 (11)	Billy Murray	NWS	10	Feb 2, 1915	23 years, 317 days	Arena, Hudson, Texas, U.S.	
18	Win	8–0 (10)	Billy Glover	TKO	6 (10)	Nov 26, 1914	23 years, 249 days	Fairmont A.C., New York City, New York, U.S.	
17	Win	7–0 (10)	Bert Fagan	KO	2 (10)	Sep 2, 1914	23 years, 164 days	Arena, Hudson, Texas, U.S.	
16	Draw	6–0 (10)	Young Mahoney	NWS	10	Jun 5, 1914	23 years, 75 days	Superior A.C., Superior, Wisconsin, U.S.	
15	Win	6–0 (9)	Buck Crouse	TKO	4 (10)	May 22, 1914	23 years, 61 days	Arena, Hudson, Texas, U.S.	
14	Win	5–0 (9)	George K.O. Brown	NWS	10	Apr 21, 1914	23 years, 30 days	Superior, Wisconsin, U.S.	
13	Win	5–0 (8)	Billy Miske	NWS	10	Mar 24, 1914	23 years, 2 days	Arena, Hudson, Texas, U.S.	
12	Win	5–0 (7)	George K.O. Brown	NWS	10	Feb 9, 1914	22 years, 324 days	Hudson, Texas, U.S.	
11	Win	5–0 (6)	Al Worgin	KO	4 (?)	Jan 15, 1914	22 years, 299 days	Hudson, Texas, U.S.	
10	Win	4–0 (6)	Willie K.O. Brennan	NWS	10	Sep 29, 1913	22 years, 191 days	Elmwood Music Hall, Buffalo, New York, U.S.	
9	Win	4–0 (5)	Jack Denning	NWS	10	Jun 13, 1913	22 years, 83 days	Madison Square Garden, New York City, New York, U.S.	
8	Draw	4–0 (4)	Frank Logan	NWS	6	Jun 9, 1913	22 years, 79 days	Olympia A.C., Philadelphia, Pennsylvania, U.S.	
7	Win	4–0 (3)	Johnny Shaw	TKO	3 (10)	May 27, 1913	22 years, 66 days	Brown's Gym A.A., Far Rockaway, New York City, New York, U.S.	
6	Win	3–0 (3)	Young Mike Donovan	NWS	10	May 16, 1913	22 years, 55 days	Madison Square Garden, New York City, New York, U.S.	
5	Win	3–0 (2)	Joe Borrell	NWS	10	Apr 29, 1913	22 years, 38 days	Fairmont A.C., New York City, New York, U.S.	
4	Win	3–0 (1)	Tommy Bergin	NWS	10	Apr 22, 1913	22 years, 31 days	Atlantic Garden A.C., New York City, New York, U.S.	
3	Win	3–0	Tommy Nelson	TKO	1 (?)	Dec 7, 1912	21 years, 260 days	Fairmont A.C., New York City, New York, U.S.	
2	Win	2–0	Colored Brown	KO	5 (?)	Oct 2, 1911	20 years, 194 days	Cooke's Gym, Minneapolis, Minnesota, U.S.	
1	Win	1–0	Oscar Kelly	KO	5 (?)	Sep 5, 1911	20 years, 167 days	Minneapolis, Minnesota, U.S.	

=== Unofficial record ===
106 fights	97 wins	4 losses
By knockout	48	1
By decision	48	3
By disqualification	1	0
Draws	4	
No contests	1	

All newspaper decisions are officially regarded as “no decision” bouts and are not counted in the win/loss/draw column.

No.	Result	Record	Opponent	Type	Round	Date	Age	Location	Notes
106	Loss	96–5–4 (1)	Gene Tunney	KO	12 (15)	Jun 5, 1925	33 years, 75 days	Polo Grounds, New York City, New York, U.S.	
105	Win	96–4–4 (1)	Tiny Jim Herman	KO	3 (10)	Jan 30, 1925	32 years, 314 days	Detroit, Michigan, U.S.	
104	Win	95–4–4 (1)	Jack Burke	TKO	6 (10)	Jan 7, 1925	32 years, 291 days	Grand Rapids, Michigan, U.S.	
103	Win	94–4–4 (1)	Kid Norfolk	TKO	6 (15)	Dec 9, 1924	33 years, 262 days	Madison Square Garden, New York City, New York, U.S.	
102	Win	93–4–4 (1)	Ted Jamieson	KO	1 (15)	Oct 24, 1924	33 years, 216 days	Coliseum Arena, New Orleans, Louisiana, U.S.	
101	Win	92–4–4 (1)	Bill Reed	TKO	3 (20)	Oct 10, 1924	33 years, 202 days	Bellaire, Ohio, U.S.	
100	Win	91–4–4 (1)	Jack Bloomfield	KO	3 (20)	Aug 9, 1924	33 years, 140 days	Wembley Stadium, Wembley, London, England, U.K.	
99	Win	90–4–4 (1)	Georges Carpentier	NWS	10	May 31, 1924	33 years, 70 days	Floyd Fitzsimmons' Arena, Michigan City, Indiana, U.S.	
98	Win	89–4–4 (1)	Jack McFarland	KO	2 (8)	Apr 3, 1924	33 years, 12 days	Nashville Baseball Park, Nashville, Tennessee, U.S.	
97	Win	88–4–4 (1)	Soldier Lee	TKO	3 (8)	Mar 31, 1924	33 years, 9 days	Memphis, Tennessee, U.S.	
96	Win	87–4–4 (1)	Joe Downey	KO	1 (12)	Mar 24, 1924	33 years, 2 days	Lakeside Park Pavilion, Dayton, Ohio, U.S.	
95	Win	86–4–4 (1)	Jack Moore	KO	2 (10)	Mar 14, 1924	32 years, 358 days	Board of Trade Building, Winnipeg, Manitoba, Canada	
94	Loss	85–4–4 (1)	Jack Dempsey	PTS	15	Jul 4, 1923	32 years, 104 days	Arena, Shelby, Montana, U.S.	For NYSAC, NBA, and The Ring heavyweight titles
93	Win	85–3–4 (1)	Chuck Wiggins	TKO	10 (15)	Apr 30, 1923	32 years, 39 days	Coliseum Arena, New Orleans, Louisiana, U.S.	
92	Win	84–3–4 (1)	Andy Schmader	KO	1 (10)	Mar 26, 1923	32 years, 4 days	Majestic Theatre, Peoria, Illinois, U.S.	
91	Win	83–3–4 (1)	Jim Tracey	KO	2 (10)	Mar 5, 1923	31 years, 348 days	East Chicago, Indiana, U.S.	
90	Win	82–3–4 (1)	Billy Miske	UD	10	Dec 15, 1922	31 years, 268 days	Auditorium, Saint Paul, Minnesota, U.S.	
89	Win	81–3–4 (1)	Joe Burke	KO	1 (10)	Dec 11, 1922	31 years, 264 days	Broadway Auditorium, Buffalo, New York, U.S.	
88	Win	80–3–4 (1)	George Ashe	KO	1 (10)	Nov 13, 1922	31 years, 236 days	Danceland Arena, Detroit, Michigan, U.S.	
87	Loss	79–3–4 (1)	Billy Miske	DQ	10 (15)	Oct 13, 1922	31 years, 205 days	Madison Square Garden, New York City, New York, U.S.	
86	Win	79–2–4 (1)	Sailor Martin	KO	2 (12)	May 29, 1922	31 years, 68 days	Broadway Bowl, Louisville, Kentucky, U.S.	
85	Win	78–2–4 (1)	Harry Foley	TKO	6 (15)	May 1, 1922	31 years, 40 days	Louisiana Auditorium, New Orleans, Louisiana, U.S.	
84	Loss	77–2–4 (1)	Harry Greb	UD	15	Mar 13, 1922	30 years, 356 days	Madison Square Garden, New York City, New York, U.S.	
83	Win	77–1–4 (1)	Pat McCarthy	TKO	4 (10)	Feb 2, 1922	30 years, 317 days	Mechanics Building, Boston, Massachusetts, U.S.	
82	Win	76–1–4 (1)	Bartley Madden	NWS	10	Dec 19, 1921	30 years, 272 days	Grand Rapids, Michigan, U.S.	
81	Win	75–1–4 (1)	Hope Mullen	KO	1 (15)	Dec 2, 1921	30 years, 255 days	Southern AC, Shreveport, Louisiana, U.S.	
80	Win	74–1–4 (1)	Dan O'Dowd	KO	6 (15)	Nov 25, 1921	30 years, 248 days	Louisiana Auditorium, New Orleans, Louisiana, U.S.	
79	Win	73–1–4 (1)	Soldier Jones	KO	1 (10)	Nov 16, 1921	30 years, 239 days	Armouries, Windsor, Ontario, Canada	
78	Win	72–1–4 (1)	Fred Allen	TKO	1 (12)	Oct 14, 1921	30 years, 206 days	Odeon Theater, Saint Louis, Missouri, U.S.	
77	Win	71–1–4 (1)	Clay Turner	KO	1 (10)	Oct 7, 1921	30 years, 199 days	Broadway Auditorium, Buffalo, New York, U.S.	
76	Win	70–1–4 (1)	Joe Burke	KO	2 (10)	Sep 20, 1921	30 years, 182 days	Kalamazoo, Michigan, U.S.	
75	Win	69–1–4 (1)	Bill Reed	TKO	2 (10)	Sep 12, 1921	30 years, 174 days	Redland Field, Cincinnati, Ohio, U.S.	
74	Win	68–1–4 (1)	Dan O'Dowd	TKO	3 (10)	Sep 5, 1921	30 years, 167 days	South Bend, Indiana, U.S.	
73	Win	67–1–4 (1)	Willie Meehan	TKO	1 (12)	Jun 22, 1921	30 years, 92 days	Dunn Field, Cleveland, Ohio, U.S.	
72	Win	66–1–4 (1)	Willie Keeler	KO	2 (10)	Jun 7, 1921	30 years, 77 days	Omaha, Nebraska, U.S.	
71	Win	65–1–4 (1)	Jack Clifford	KO	3 (12)	May 30, 1921	30 years, 69 days	Ebbets Field, New York City, New York, U.S.	
70	Win	64–1–4 (1)	Sergeant Ray Smith	KO	2 (12)	May 27, 1921	30 years, 66 days	Idora Park, Youngstown, Ohio, U.S.	
69	Win	63–1–4 (1)	Jack Heinen	KO	1 (12)	May 23, 1921	30 years, 62 days	Canton Auditorium, Canton, Ohio, U.S.	
68	Win	62–1–4 (1)	Hugh Walker	TKO	2 (10)	Apr 29, 1921	30 years, 38 days	Grand Opera House, Terre Haute, Pennsylvania, U.S.	
67	Win	61–1–4 (1)	Porky Dan Flynn	TKO	11 (12)	Apr 19, 1921	30 years, 28 days	Coliseum, Newark, New Jersey, U.S.	
66	Win	60–1–4 (1)	Larry Williams	TKO	4 (12)	Apr 12, 1921	30 years, 21 days	Pioneer Sporting Club, New York City, New York, U.S.	
65	Win	59–1–4 (1)	Sergeant Norcross	KO	1 (12)	Mar 31, 1921	30 years, 9 days	Springfield, Ohio, U.S.	
64	Win	58–1–4 (1)	Paul Samson Koerner	TKO	2 (15)	Mar 22, 1921	30 years, 0 days	Pioneer Sporting Club, New York City, New York, U.S.	
63	Win	57–1–4 (1)	Al Reich	KO	1 (10)	Mar 18, 1921	29 years, 361 days	Cleveland, Ohio, U.S.	
62	Win	56–1–4 (1)	Hugh Walker	NWS	10	Feb 14, 1921	29 years, 329 days	Heuck's Opera House, Cincinnati, Ohio, U.S.	
61	Win	55–1–4 (1)	Tony Melchior	KO	1 (12)	Feb 10, 1921	29 years, 325 days	Coliseum, Toledo, Ohio, U.S.	
60	Win	54–1–4 (1)	Chuck Wiggins	NWS	10	Jan 11, 1921	29 years, 295 days	Heuck's Opera House, Cincinnati, Ohio, U.S.	
59	Win	53–1–4 (1)	Chuck Wiggins	NWS	12	Dec 6, 1920	29 years, 259 days	Coliseum, Toledo, Ohio, U.S.	
58	Win	52–1–4 (1)	Hugh Walker	NWS	10	Nov 11, 1920	29 years, 234 days	Peoria, Illinois, U.S.	
57	Loss	51–1–4 (1)	Harry Greb	NWS	10	Jul 31, 1920	29 years, 131 days	Forbes Field, Pittsburgh, Pennsylvania, U.S.	
56	Win	51–0–4 (1)	Clay Turner	NWS	10	Jul 22, 1920	29 years, 122 days	Nicollet Park, Minneapolis, Minnesota, U.S.	
55	Win	50–0–4 (1)	Harry Greb	NWS	10	May 15, 1920	29 years, 54 days	Forbes Field, Pittsburgh, Pennsylvania, U.S.	
54	Win	49–0–4 (1)	Bob Roper	NWS	10	Apr 9, 1920	29 years, 18 days	Armory, Minneapolis, Minnesota, U.S.	
53	Win	48–0–4 (1)	Jack Reeves	KO	2 (15)	Feb 19, 1920	28 years, 334 days	Edmonton, Alberta, Canada	
52	Draw	47–0–4 (1)	Noel "Boy" McCormick	PTS	10	Feb 11, 1920	28 years, 326 days	Arena, Milwaukie, Oregon, U.S.	
51	Win	47–0–3 (1)	George K.O. Brown	NWS	10	Feb 2, 1920	28 years, 317 days	Peoria, Illinois, U.S.	
50	Win	46–0–3 (1)	Jimmy Darcy	PTS	10	Dec 16, 1919	28 years, 269 days	Arena, Milwaukie, Oregon, U.S.	
49	Win	45–0–3 (1)	Frank Farmer	PTS	6	Dec 3, 1919	28 years, 256 days	Crystal Pool, Seattle, Washington, U.S.	
48	Win	44–0–3 (1)	Mick King	PTS	15	Nov 27, 1919	28 years, 250 days	Victoria Pavilion, Calgary, Alberta, Canada	
47	Win	43–0–3 (1)	George K.O. Brown	NWS	12	Jul 3, 1919	28 years, 103 days	Denver, Colorado, U.S.	
46	Draw	42–0–3 (1)	Billy Miske	NWS	10	Jun 19, 1919	28 years, 89 days	Nicollet Park, Minneapolis, Minnesota, U.S.	
45	Win	42–0–2 (1)	Tom Roper	NWS	10	Apr 28, 1919	28 years, 37 days	Waterloo Theatre, Waterloo, Iowa, U.S.	
44	Win	41–0–2 (1)	George Chip	PTS	10	Apr 10, 1919	28 years, 19 days	Stockyards Stadium, Denver, Colorado, U.S.	
43	Win	40–0–2 (1)	Larry Williams	NWS	10	Feb 10, 1919	27 years, 325 days	Broadway Auditorium, Buffalo, New York City, New York, U.S.	
42	Win	39–0–2 (1)	Len Rowlands	NWS	10	Jan 30, 1919	27 years, 314 days	Town Hall, Scranton, Pennsylvania, U.S.	
41	NC	38–0–2 (1)	Bartley Madden	NC	4 (6)	Jan 25, 1919	27 years, 309 days	National A.C., Philadelphia, Pennsylvania, U.S.	
40	Win	38–0–2	George Chip	NWS	12	May 3, 1918	27 years, 42 days	Coliseum, Des Moines, Iowa, U.S.	
39	Win	37–0–2	Gus Christie	PTS	10	Apr 26, 1918	27 years, 35 days	Terre Haute, Pennsylvania, U.S.	
38	Win	36–0–2	Silent Martin	NWS	15	Apr 20, 1918	27 years, 29 days	Armory, Akron, Ohio, U.S.	
37	Win	35–0–2	Clay Turner	NWS	10	Apr 18, 1918	27 years, 27 days	Town Hall, Scranton, Pennsylvania, U.S.	
36	Win	34–0–2	Gus Christie	NWS	12	Mar 22, 1918	27 years, 0 days	Coliseum, Des Moines, Iowa, U.S.	
35	Win	33–0–2	Silent Martin	KO	10 (15)	Mar 13, 1918	26 years, 356 days	Albaugh Theater, Baltimore, Maryland, U.S.	
34	Win	32–0–2	George Chip	NWS	10	Mar 7, 1918	26 years, 350 days	Town Hall, Scranton, Pennsylvania, U.S.	
33	Win	31–0–2	Clay Turner	NWS	10	Feb 11, 1918	26 years, 326 days	Southside Market House, Pittsburgh, Pennsylvania, U.S.	
32	Win	30–0–2	Gus Christie	NWS	10	Feb 4, 1918	26 years, 319 days	Southside Market House, Pittsburgh, Pennsylvania, U.S.	
31	Win	29–0–2	Gus Christie	PTS	15	Sep 3, 1917	26 years, 165 days	Dayton, Ohio, U.S.	
30	Win	28–0–2	George Chip	NWS	10	Aug 22, 1917	26 years, 153 days	Auditorium, Saint Paul, Minnesota, U.S.	
29	Win	27–0–2	Battling Levinsky	NWS	10	Mar 23, 1917	26 years, 1 day	Auditorium, Saint Paul, Minnesota, U.S.	World light heavyweight title at stake; (via KO only)
28	Win	26–0–2	Jackie Clark	NWS	10	Mar 15, 1917	25 years, 358 days	Town Hall, Scranton, Pennsylvania, U.S.	
27	Win	25–0–2	Bert Kenny	NWS	10	Mar 3, 1917	25 years, 346 days	Fairmont A.C., New York City, New York, U.S.	
26	Win	24–0–2	Bob Moha	NWS	10	Feb 6, 1917	25 years, 321 days	Elite Rink, Milwaukee, Wisconsin, U.S.	
25	Win	23–0–2	Joe Herrick	NWS	12	Nov 16, 1916	25 years, 239 days	Winnipeg, Manitoba, Canada	
24	Win	22–0–2	Joe Herrick	NWS	12	Oct 27, 1916	25 years, 219 days	Walker Theatre, Winnipeg, Manitoba, Canada	
23	Win	21–0–2	Vic Hansen	PTS	10	Mar 8, 1916	24 years, 352 days	Saint Joseph, Missouri	
22	Win	20–0–2	Gus Christie	NWS	12	Feb 15, 1916	24 years, 330 days	Winnipeg, Manitoba, Canada	
21	Win	19–0–2	Harry Greb	NWS	10	Nov 16, 1915	24 years, 239 days	Auditorium, Saint Paul, Minnesota, U.S.	
20	Win	18–0–2	Billy Miske	NWS	10	Jul 12, 1915	24 years, 112 days	Auditorium, Saint Paul, Minnesota, U.S.	
19	Win	17–0–2	Billy Murray	NWS	10	Feb 2, 1915	23 years, 317 days	Arena, Hudson, Texas, U.S.	
18	Win	16–0–2	Billy Glover	TKO	6 (10)	Nov 26, 1914	23 years, 249 days	Fairmont A.C., New York City, New York, U.S.	
17	Win	15–0–2	Bert Fagan	KO	2 (10)	Sep 2, 1914	23 years, 164 days	Arena, Hudson, Texas, U.S.	
16	Draw	14–0–2	Young Mahoney	NWS	10	Jun 5, 1914	23 years, 75 days	Superior A.C., Superior, Wisconsin, U.S.	
15	Win	14–0–1	Buck Crouse	TKO	4 (10)	May 22, 1914	23 years, 61 days	Arena, Hudson, Texas, U.S.	
14	Win	13–0–1	George K.O. Brown	NWS	10	Apr 21, 1914	23 years, 30 days	Superior, Wisconsin, U.S.	
13	Win	12–0–1	Billy Miske	NWS	10	Mar 24, 1914	23 years, 2 days	Arena, Hudson, Texas, U.S.	
12	Win	11–0–1	George K.O. Brown	NWS	10	Feb 9, 1914	22 years, 324 days	Hudson, Texas, U.S.	
11	Win	10–0–1	Al Worgin	KO	4 (?)	Jan 15, 1914	22 years, 299 days	Hudson, Texas, U.S.	
10	Win	9–0–1	Willie K.O. Brennan	NWS	10	Sep 29, 1913	22 years, 191 days	Elmwood Music Hall, Buffalo, New York, U.S.	
9	Win	8–0–1	Jack Denning	NWS	10	Jun 13, 1913	22 years, 83 days	Madison Square Garden, New York City, New York, U.S.	
8	Draw	7–0–1	Frank Logan	NWS	6	Jun 9, 1913	22 years, 79 days	Olympia A.C., Philadelphia, Pennsylvania, U.S.	
7	Win	7–0	Johnny Shaw	TKO	3 (10)	May 27, 1913	22 years, 66 days	Brown's Gym A.A., Far Rockaway, New York City, New York, U.S.	
6	Win	6–0	Young Mike Donovan	NWS	10	May 16, 1913	22 years, 55 days	Madison Square Garden, New York City, New York, U.S.	
5	Win	5–0	Joe Borrell	NWS	10	Apr 29, 1913	22 years, 38 days	Fairmont A.C., New York City, New York, U.S.	
4	Win	4–0	Tommy Bergin	NWS	10	Apr 22, 1913	22 years, 31 days	Atlantic Garden A.C., New York City, New York, U.S.	
3	Win	3–0	Tommy Nelson	TKO	1 (?)	Dec 7, 1912	21 years, 260 days	Fairmont A.C., New York City, New York, U.S.	
2	Win	2–0	Colored Brown	KO	5 (?)	Oct 2, 1911	20 years, 194 days	Cooke's Gym, Minneapolis, Minnesota, U.S.	
1	Win	1–0	Oscar Kelly	KO	5 (?)	Sep 5, 1911	20 years, 167 days	Minneapolis, Minnesota, U.S.	

== See also ==
- Boxing in the 1920s
- International Boxing Hall of Fame
