= Al Weill =

Boxing manager and promoter

Personal information
- Born: December 28, 1893 Guebwiller, France
- Died: October 20, 1969 (aged 75) Florida, U.S.

Armand "Al" Weill (December 28, 1893 – October 20, 1969) was an American boxing manager born in France.

== Background ==
Weill moved to the United States from his birthplace of France at the age of 13. In his early years, he began working as a professional ballroom dancer and would promote dance competitions. At the time, boxing matches and dance competitions were often held in the same locations, and Weill found his way into becoming a manager at the Harlem Sporting Club.

== Early professional career ==
Weill began managing boxers at the Harlem Sporting Club. The first professional boxer he managed was New York State featherweight champion Charlie Pilkington.

Over the course of his career, he managed four world champions Rocky Marciano, Marty Servo, Lou Ambers, Joey Archibald and several other boxers.

In 1930, Weill and his business partner Dick Gray arrived in New London, Connecticut and established the Thames Arena, where Weill began making a promoting matches.

In 1949, Weill became matchmaker at Madison Square Garden where he stayed until 1952.

== Marciano's manager ==
In 1952, Weill left Madison Square Garden to become the manager of boxer Rocky Marciano.

On June 18, 1957, Marciano announced publicly that he and Weill were ending their partnership "amicably." Weill had largely limited Marciano's public appearances, and as a result of his retirement a year earlier, wanted to focus on charitable work that Weill had so long forbid.

== Later years ==
In 1958, Weill moved to California, saying "Hollywood and Los Angeles are the greatest fight cities in the world.".

Later in his life, Weill himself retired from boxing to Florida.
