= Richard Pilkington =

Richard Pilkington may refer to:

- Richard Pilkington (Newton MP) (1841–1908), British Member of Parliament for Newton (1899–1906), member of the Pilkington glass-manufacturing family
- Richard Pilkington (politician, born 1908) (1908–1976), British soldier and Member of Parliament for Widnes (1935–1945), and Poole (1951–1964)
- Richard Pilkington (bowls), lawn bowls competitor for New Zealand
- Richard Pilkington (priest) (died 1631), Anglican priest
