= Charles Pilkington (cricketer, born 1837) =

English cricketer and clergyman

Personal information
- Full name: Charles Henry Pilkington
- Born: 3 December 1837; Southampton, Hampshire, England
- Died: 22 March 1900 (aged 62); Upper Heyford, Oxfordshire, England
- Batting: Unknown

Domestic team information
- Years: Team
- 1858: Oxford University

Career statistics
| Competition | First-class |
|---|---|
| Matches | 1 |
| Runs scored | 5 |
| Batting average | 5.00 |
| 100s/50s | –/– |
| Top score | 5 |
| Catches/stumpings | –/– |
- Source: Cricinfo, 3 April 2020

Charles Henry Pilkington (3 December 1837 – 22 March 1900) was an English first-class cricketer and clergyman.

== Biography ==
The son of Charles Pilkington Sr., he was born in Southampton in December 1837. He was educated at Winchester College, before going up to New College, Oxford (where he was also a fellow from 1854 to 1869). While studying at Oxford, he made a single appearance in first-class cricket for Oxford University against the Marylebone Cricket Club at Oxford in 1858. Batting once in the match, he was dismissed opening the batting for 5 runs by James Grundy.

After graduating from Oxford, he took holy orders in the Church of England. Pilkington's first ecclesiastical post was as curate of Fair Oak in Hampshire from 1860 to 1868. He moved to Herefordshire in 1868, where he held the post of rector of Elton, before returning to Hampshire in 1871 to become the vicar of Owslebury until 1875. He held the post of vicar of The Tything at Worcester from 1875 to 1882, before moving to Norfolk where he held the post of rector of Saint John the Baptist at Norwich until 1888. His final ecclesiastical post was as rector of Upper Heyford, Oxfordshire a post he held until his death there in March 1900.
