= Charlie Pilkington =

American boxer

Personal information
- Nickname: "The Meriden Flash"
- Nationality: (United States) American
- Born: Charles Pilkington; September 22, 1897 New York City
- Died: May 20, 1974 (aged 76) Meriden, Connecticut
- Weight: Featherweight

Boxing career

Boxing record
- Total fights: 252
- Wins: 185
- Losses: 17
- Draws: 7

Charles Francis Pilkington (September 22, 1897 - May 20, 1974), known as Charlie Pilkington and The Meriden Flash, was an American professional boxer in the Featherweight division.

== Background ==
Pilkington was born on September 22, 1897, in New York City to Anglo-Irish parents. He was a descendant of Jacobite members of the Pilkington Family of Lancashire, England, who fled to Ireland after the Battle of Preston in 1716. Growing up in a tenement in East Harlem, Pilkington was advised by a doctor to pursue exercise to improve his health and took up boxing at the Union Settlement Association.

== Professional career ==
Pilkington learned to box by watching Benny Leonard, Harlem Tommy Murphy, and Irish Patsy Cline at his neighborhood gym and based much of his early technique off of what he observed. Beginning his boxing career with a win in an amateur match at the Union Settlement Association Athletic Club in 1915, Pilkington would spend four years in the amateur leagues, earning the name the "Harlem Flash". When he later moved to Meriden, Connecticut, this early nickname morphed into the "Meriden Flash." During this time, Pilkington lost only 4 out of 150 matches; winning the New York State and Metropolitan Crown boxing titles in the featherweight division. During his early career, he was the first professional boxer to be coached and managed by famed manager Al Weill.

Turning pro to support his family in 1919, he began professional boxing in New Jersey and Connecticut. During his first professional fight, he knocked out Joe Welling in four rounds. Later, he boxed against well known boxer Sammy Waltz, knocking him down with his first punch.

At the height of his career, Pilkington was so popular in the greater New York area that after a victory over Johnny Shugrue was proclaimed a draw, New Haven police officers had to escort the referee out of the arena to prevent a riot by Pilkington's fans.

Pilkington fought Jack Bernstein at the Commonwealth Sporting Club in New York in December 1923, where he repetitively held Bernstein's arms and "head butted" him, losing the match after being disqualified. In 1924, he traveled to Australia for his last professional matches - a five fight bout, winning three matches, losing one, and boxing a draw in the other.

By the end of his career, Pilkington was New York State champion for the 108,115, and 125 pound class.

Later in his life, Pilkington became a noted referee, matchmaker, trainer, and promoter. As a mentor and sparring partner, he is largely credited with helping mold the career of famed boxer Kid Kaplan. While working as a promoter in the 1930s, Pilkington publicly spoke out against Kaplan, then a referee, resulting in a large public dispute that ended in Pilkington's license being revoked. Known as "The Boxing Master," he trained many future boxing stars, including Eddie Campagnuolo.

== Personal life ==
Pilkington's younger brother, "Irish" Jackie Pilkington, was also a professional boxer.

== See also ==
- List of people from Harlem
