= Jack Kearns =

American boxer (1882–1963)

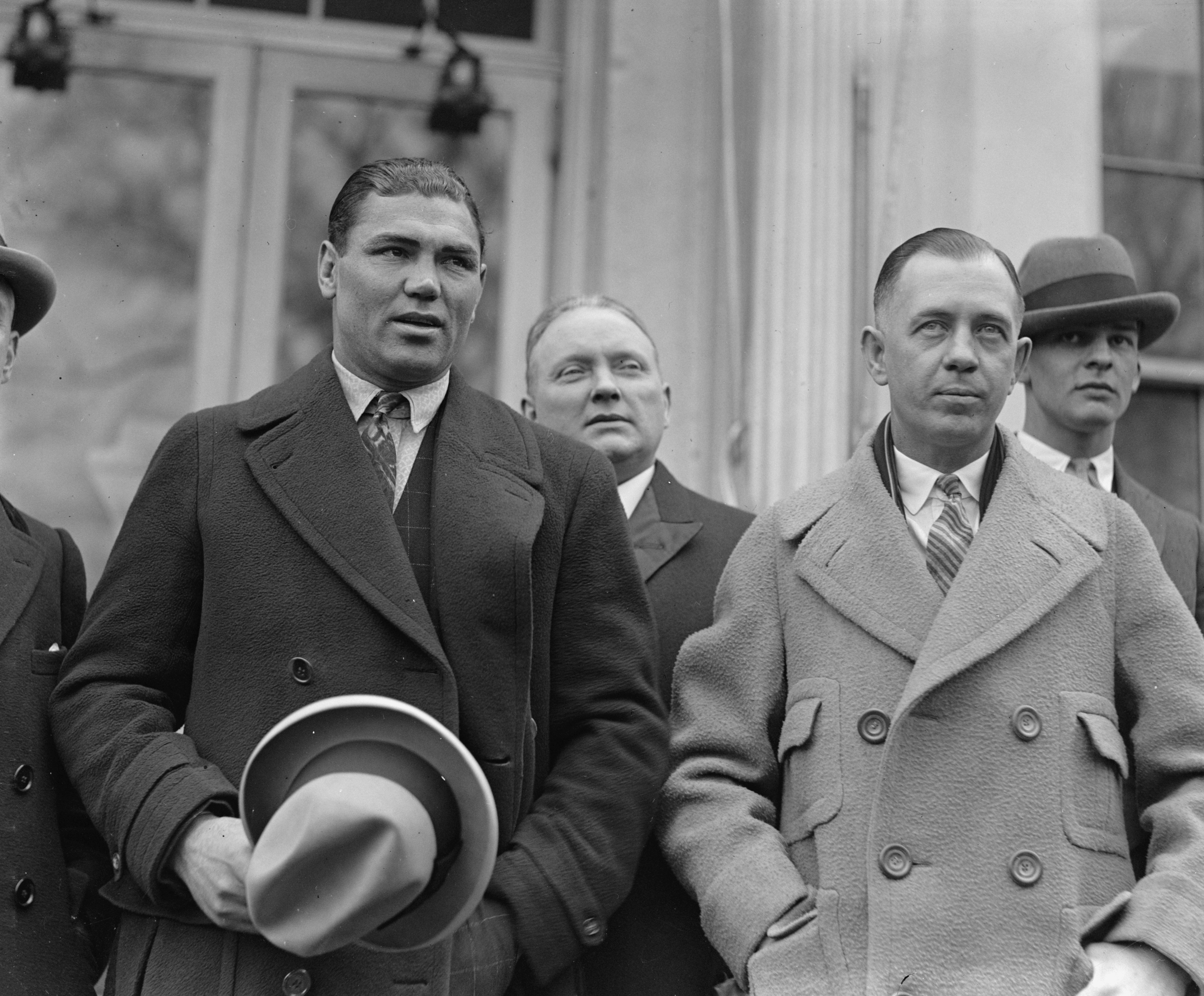
Kearns (right) and Jack Dempsey

Jack "Doc" Kearns (born John Patrick Leo McKernan; August 17, 1882 – July 7, 1963) was an American boxer and boxing manager. He was born on a farm in Waterloo, Michigan to Phillip H. McKernan and Frances M. Knauf (aka Hoff, later Quigley), daughter of German immigrant and Waterloo, Michigan, settler Peter Knauf. His father was the son of Irish immigrants Philip and Amelia "Ann" McKernan and is noted as being "among the early pioneers in the Northwestern Territories of Montana, Idaho and Washington."

== Professional boxing ==
Known as "Young Kid Kearns", he adopted the Kearns surname while boxing. Following 67 professional lightweight and welterweight fights, he became a boxing coach and manager.

Kearns was reportedly tutored as a manager and promoter in San Francisco—then the epicenter of the boxing scene in America—by veteran featherweight Dal Hawkins, the former boxing instructor at the Seattle Athletic Club, a city in which Kearns had briefly "piloted a primitive taxicab."

He is most remembered for achieving the first "million dollar gate" in boxing when the Jack Dempsey vs. Georges Carpentier bout generated a record $1,789,238 in ticket sales, and for managing Jack Dempsey, who became World Heavyweight Champion from 1919 to 1926 and gave him the nickname "The Doc". Kearns was sued by Dempsey, then repeatedly and unsuccessfully sued Dempsey for large sums of money, following his firing; the two became friendly again in later life. Following his death, Dempsey was quoted as saying that Kearns "made me a champ... he was a great manager, and I'll miss him." Kearns managed six world champions: Jack Dempsey, Mickey Walker, Jackie Fields, Benny Leonard, Joey Maxim, and Archie Moore.

== Personal life ==
On March 20, 1915, Kearns married Edythe Angell, a dancer who had performed in Vaudeville as the Angell Sisters with her sister Gertrude and solo as Ledana. The couple divorced, and he remarried August 4, 1921; the pair were also divorced, on March 18, 1932. However, Kearns disputed the existence of this second marriage to a woman known as Legana Kearns, despite a judgement against him for alimony, which he lost by default, being a no-show in court.

== Legacy ==
The Million Dollar Gate, Kearns' memoir as told to sportswriter Oscar Fraley, was published posthumously in 1966.

In 1989, the LA Times reported Kearns to be "one of the great sports con men of the century."

In 1990, Kearns was inducted into the International Boxing Hall of Fame and is there lauded as "a master of publicity and... largely responsible for making possible the first million-dollar gate in boxing history" at the 1921 Jack Dempsey vs. Georges Carpentier bout.

== See also ==
- Jack Dempsey vs. Tommy Gibbons
