= Kid Kaplan =

Ukrainian–American boxer (1901–1970)

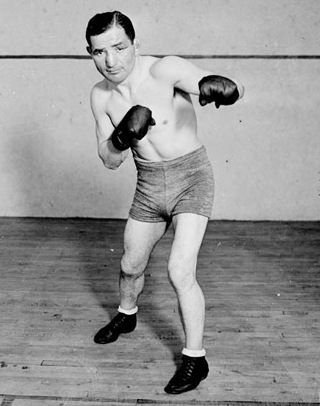

Personal information
- Nickname: The Meridan Buzzsaw[4]
- Nationality: American
- Born: Louis Kaplan; October 15, 1901 Kyiv, Kiev Governorate, Russian Empire
- Died: October 26, 1970 (aged 69) Norwich, Connecticut, U.S.
- Height: 5 ft 2 in (1.57 m)
- Weight: Featherweight

Boxing career
- Reach: 62.5 in (159 cm)
- Stance: Orthodox

Boxing record
- Total fights: 164; with the inclusion of newspaper decisions
- Wins: 121
- Win by KO: 27
- Losses: 22
- Draws: 16

Louis "Kid" Kaplan (born October 15, 1901, in Kyiv, Ukraine – October 26, 1970), known as the Meridan Buzzsaw, was a professional boxer and a 1925 world featherweight champion.

== Early life ==
Kaplan and his family emigrated to the United States from the Kyiv when he was five years old and settled in Meriden, Connecticut. While selling fruit for five cents a day, he began boxing as a teenager at the Lenox Athletic Club in Meriden, and turned professional in 1919.

== Professional career ==
Kaplan began his boxing career in the Connecticut State circuit. At the time, Meriden was an epicenter of boxing in the Northeastern United States. Early in his career, Kaplan fought the popular local favorite and former New York State champion Charlie Pilkington. Though they never boxed a professional match together, their early rivalry and Pilkington's role as a mentor and sparring partner had much to do with launching Kaplan's very successful boxing career.

A busy fighter, he engaged in over 50 bouts in his first four years in the paid ranks. During one of his early fights in 1920, Kaplan knocked out opponent Sailor Cunningham within two minutes.

After winning against Hughie Hutchinson and Earl Baird in 1922, Kaplan gained significant popularity.

In 1923 he twice drew with rival Babe Herman before scoring a 10-round win over future world lightweight champ Jimmy Goodrich.

=== World featherweight champion, 1925 ===
By late 1924, World Featherweight champion Johnny Dundee vacated his title and a tournament was arranged to determine a successor. "Kid" kayoed Angel Diaz in three rounds, outpointed Bobby Garcia over 10-rounds, and then halted Joe Lombardo in four rounds to advance to the finals. On January 2, 1925, he knocked out Danny Kramer in nine rounds at Madison Square Garden to become the new champion. His first two defenses were against the familiar Babe Herman (D15 and W15) in late 1925. Kaplan next decisioned Hall of Famer Billy Petrolle over 12 rounds in a non-title bout.

However, Kaplan's reign as champion was nearing its end. Despite standing 5 ft 4 in., he was experiencing difficulty making the featherweight limit and decided to relinquish the crown to campaign as a lightweight in 1927. As a 135-pounder, he scored wins over Jackie Fields, Johnny Jadick, Billy Wallace, Battling Battalino and Sammy Mandell among others. Amongst the wins were losses to Wallace and Hall of Famer Jimmy McLarnin. In 1933 he lost to Herbert "Cocoa Kid" Lewis Hardwick, and promptly retired from the ring with a 108-17-13D- 12 ND (26KOs) record.

Known as a rugged, pressing boxer who possessed tremendous stamina, the crowd-pleasing "Meriden Buzzsaw" died on October 26, 1970, in Norwich, Connecticut.

== Halls of Fame ==
Kaplan was inducted into the International Boxing Hall of Fame in 2003.

Kaplan, who was Jewish, was inducted into the International Jewish Sports Hall of Fame in 1986.

== Miscellaneous ==
- Brother of fellow boxer Israel "Izzy" Kaplan

== Professional boxing record ==
All information in this section is derived from BoxRec, unless otherwise stated.

=== Official Record ===
164 fights	107 wins	22 losses
By knockout	27	3
By decision	75	18
By disqualification	5	1
Draws	13	
No contests	5	
Newspaper decisions/draws	17	

All newspaper decisions are officially regarded as “no decision” bouts and are not counted to the win/loss/draw column.

No.	Result	Record	Opponent	Type	Round(s)	Date	Location	Notes
164	Loss	107–22–13 (22)	Herbert Lewis Hardwick	PTS	10	Feb 20, 1933	Arena, New Haven, Connecticut, U.S.	
163	Win	107–21–13 (22)	Eddie Holmes	PTS	10	Oct 13, 1932	Foot Guard Hall, Hartford, Connecticut, U.S.	
162	Loss	106–21–13 (22)	Pancho Villa	SD	10	Sep 9, 1932	Casino, Fall River, Massachusetts, U.S.	
161	Win	106–20–13 (22)	Frankie Petrolle	PTS	8	Aug 4, 1932	Yankee Stadium, Bronx, New York City, New York, U.S.	
160	Win	105–20–13 (22)	Emil Rossi	PTS	8	Jul 19, 1932	Queensboro Stadium, Long Island City, Queens, New York City, New York, U.S.	
159	Win	104–20–13 (22)	Jackie Pilkington	PTS	10	Jun 29, 1932	Hurley Stadium, East Hartford, Connecticut, U.S.	
158	Loss	103–20–13 (22)	Eddie Ran	KO	1 (8)	Nov 20, 1931	Madison Square Garden, Manhattan, New York City, New York, U.S.	
157	Win	103–19–13 (22)	Harry Dublinsky	PTS	8	Nov 4, 1931	Chicago Stadium, Chicago, Illinois, U.S.	
156	Win	102–19–13 (22)	Pancho Villa	KO	9 (10)	Oct 12, 1931	Valley Arena, Holyoke, Massachusetts, U.S.	
155	Win	101–19–13 (22)	Jackie Pilkington	PTS	10	Sep 8, 1931	Capital Park Stadium, Hartford, Connecticut, U.S.	Won vacant New England lightweight title
154	Win	100–19–13 (22)	Sammy Mandell	PTS	10	Aug 24, 1931	Hurley Stadium, East Hartford, Connecticut, U.S.	
153	Win	99–19–13 (22)	Tommy Jarrett	PTS	10	Jul 23, 1931	Meadowbrook Arena, North Adams, Massachusetts, U.S.	
152	Win	98–19–13 (22)	Ralph Lenny	PTS	10	Apr 20, 1931	State Armory, Hartford, Connecticut, U.S.	
151	Win	97–19–13 (22)	Billy Lynch	PTS	10	Apr 6, 1931	Foot Guard Hall, Hartford, Connecticut, U.S.	
150	Win	96–19–13 (22)	Buster Brown	PTS	10	Mar 16, 1931	104th Medical Regiment Armory, Baltimore, Maryland, U.S.	
149	Win	95–19–13 (22)	Tommy Crowley	TKO	6 (10)	Mar 4, 1931	Columbus Civic Center, Rochester, New York, U.S.	
148	Win	94–19–13 (22)	Jack Portney	PTS	10	Feb 4, 1931	Arena, New Haven, Connecticut, U.S.	
147	Loss	93–19–13 (22)	Justo Suárez	PTS	10	Oct 17, 1930	Madison Square Garden, Manhattan, New York City, New York, U.S.	
146	Win	93–18–13 (22)	Christopher Battalino	PTS	10	Sep 24, 1930	Hurley Stadium, East Hartford, Connecticut, U.S.	
145	Win	92–18–13 (22)	Jimmy O'Brien	TKO	9 (10)	Aug 9, 1930	Walnut Beach Stadium, Milford, Connecticut, U.S.	
144	Win	91–18–13 (22)	Maurice Holtzer	PTS	10	Jun 30, 1930	Heywood Arena, West Springfield, Massachusetts, U.S.	
143	Win	90–18–13 (22)	Tommy Crowley	PTS	10	Jun 19, 1930	Lakewood Arena, Waterbury, Connecticut, U.S.	
142	Win	89–18–13 (22)	Joey Medill	PTS	10	Jun 2, 1930	Hurley Stadium, East Hartford, Connecticut, U.S.	
141	Win	88–18–13 (22)	Johnny Farr	PTS	10	Mar 18, 1930	Arena, New Haven, Connecticut, U.S.	
140	Loss	87–18–13 (22)	Jack Portney	PTS	10	Feb 24, 1930	104th Regiment Armory, Baltimore, Maryland, U.S.	
139	Win	87–17–13 (22)	Andy Callahan	PTS	10	Dec 13, 1929	Arena, New Haven, Connecticut, U.S.	
138	Win	86–17–13 (22)	Emory Cabana	PTS	10	Nov 19, 1929	Arena, New Haven, Connecticut, U.S.	
137	Win	85–17–13 (22)	Eddie Wolfe	TKO	8 (10)	Oct 30, 1929	Coliseum, Chicago, Illinois, U.S.	
136	Loss	84–17–13 (22)	Emory Cabana	PTS	10	Sep 17, 1929	Arena, New Haven, Connecticut, U.S.	
135	Win	84–16–13 (22)	Henri Dewancker	TKO	7 (12)	Sep 9, 1929	Carlin's Park, Baltimore, Maryland, U.S.	
134	Win	83–16–13 (22)	Joe Trabon	PTS	10	Aug 22, 1929	Lakewood Arena, Waterbury, Connecticut, U.S.	
133	Win	82–16–13 (22)	Billy Wallace	PTS	10	May 10, 1929	Madison Square Garden, Manhattan, New York City, New York, U.S.	
132	Win	81–16–13 (22)	Joey Medill	PTS	10	Apr 11, 1929	Olympia Stadium, Detroit, Michigan, U.S.	
131	Win	80–16–13 (22)	Joe Glick	PTS	10	Apr 2, 1929	Arena, New Haven, Connecticut, U.S.	
130	Loss	79–16–13 (22)	Freddie Mueller	DQ	8 (10)	Feb 26, 1929	Arena, New Haven, Connecticut, U.S.	Kaplan was disqualified following a low blow
129	Win	79–15–13 (22)	Phil McGraw	PTS	10	Feb 14, 1929	State Armory, Waterbury, Connecticut, U.S.	
128	Win	78–15–13 (22)	Johnny Jadick	DQ	7 (10)	Jan 11, 1929	Boston Garden, Boston, Massachusetts, U.S.	Jadick was disqualified for persistent holding
127	Win	77–15–13 (22)	Ritchie King	PTS	10	Jan 1, 1929	Arena, Philadelphia, Pennsylvania, U.S.	
126	Win	76–15–13 (22)	Bruce Flowers	PTS	10	Oct 16, 1928	Arena, New Haven, Connecticut, U.S.	
125	Win	75–15–13 (22)	Bert Lamb	KO	7 (10)	Sep 21, 1928	Olympia Stadium, Detroit, Michigan, U.S.	
124	Loss	74–15–13 (22)	Manuel Quintero	PTS	10	Jul 2, 1928	White City Stadium, West Haven, Connecticut, U.S.	
123	Loss	74–14–13 (22)	Manuel Quintero	PTS	10	May 31, 1928	Madison Square Garden, Manhattan, New York City, New York, U.S.	
122	Win	74–13–13 (22)	Georgie Day	PTS	10	May 8, 1928	Arena, New Haven, Connecticut, U.S.	
121	Win	73–13–13 (22)	Joe Trabon	PTS	10	Feb 27, 1928	Edgerton Park Arena, Rochester, New York, U.S.	
120	Win	72–13–13 (22)	Bobby Mays	PTS	10	Feb 20, 1928	Arena, New Haven, Connecticut, U.S.	
119	Win	71–13–13 (22)	Mike Dundee	PTS	12	Nov 1, 1927	Arena, New Haven, Connecticut, U.S.	
118	Loss	70–13–13 (22)	Jimmy McLarnin	KO	8 (10)	Oct 18, 1927	Coliseum, Chicago, Illinois, U.S.	
117	Win	70–12–13 (22)	Tommy Cello	PTS	10	Oct 11, 1927	St. Nicholas Arena, Manhattan, New York City, New York, U.S.	
116	Win	69–12–13 (22)	Clicky Clark	TKO	5 (12)	Sep 8, 1927	Arena, New Haven, Connecticut, U.S.	
115	Win	68–12–13 (22)	Bruce Flowers	PTS	10	Jun 29, 1927	Queensboro Stadium, Long Island City, Queens, New York City, New York, U.S.	
114	Win	67–12–13 (22)	Jackie Fields	PTS	10	Jun 15, 1927	Polo Grounds, Manhattan, New York City, New York, U.S.	
113	Win	66–12–13 (22)	Al Foreman	PTS	10	May 9, 1927	Arena, Philadelphia, Pennsylvania, U.S.	
112	Win	65–12–13 (22)	Tony Vaccarelli	TKO	8 (12)	May 2, 1927	Arena, New Haven, Connecticut, U.S.	
111	Win	64–12–13 (22)	Johnny Ceccoli	PTS	10	Apr 4, 1927	Arena, Philadelphia, Pennsylvania, U.S.	
110	Win	63–12–13 (22)	Jackie Brady	PTS	10	Mar 28, 1927	Convention Hall, Rochester, New York, U.S.	
109	Win	62–12–13 (22)	Frankie Fink	TKO	8 (10)	Mar 18, 1927	Madison Square Garden, Manhattan, New York City, New York, U.S.	
108	Win	61–12–13 (22)	Lou Paluso	PTS	12	Jan 17, 1927	Public Hall, Cleveland, Ohio, U.S.	
107	Win	60–12–13 (22)	Paris Cangey	KO	4 (10)	Jan 10, 1927	Convention Hall, Rochester, New York, U.S.	
106	Loss	59–12–13 (22)	Billy Wallace	KO	5 (15)	Dec 2, 1926	Public Hall, Cleveland, Ohio, U.S.	
105	Win	59–11–13 (22)	Tommy Cello	PTS	10	Nov 5, 1926	Valley Arena, Holyoke, Massachusetts, U.S.	
104	Win	58–11–13 (22)	Tommy Cello	PTS	10	Aug 3, 1926	Queensboro Stadium, Long Island City, Queens, New York City, New York, U.S.	
103	Win	57–11–13 (22)	Bobby Garcia	TKO	10 (15)	Jun 28, 1926	Hurley Stadium, Hartford, Connecticut, U.S.	Retained NYSAC and The Ring featherweight titles
102	Win	56–11–13 (22)	Billy White	NWS	10	Jun 4, 1926	Boyle's Thirty Acres, Jersey City, New Jersey, U.S.	
101	Win	56–11–13 (21)	Leo Roy	KO	7 (10)	Apr 21, 1926	Forum, Montreal, Quebec, Canada	
100	Win	55–11–13 (21)	Mickey Chapin	UD	10	Apr 12, 1926	Town Hall, Scranton, Pennsylvania, U.S.	
99	Win	54–11–13 (21)	Tommy Herman	PTS	12	Mar 26, 1926	104th Medical Regiment Armory, Baltimore, Maryland, U.S.	
98	Draw	53–11–13 (21)	Eddie Wagner	PTS	10	Mar 8, 1926	Arena, Philadelphia, Pennsylvania, U.S.	
97	Win	53–11–12 (21)	Billy Petrolle	PTS	12	Mar 1, 1926	Mechanics Building, Boston, Massachusetts, U.S.	
96	Win	52–11–12 (21)	Billy Murphy	PTS	10	Jan 25, 1926	Mechanics Building, Boston, Massachusetts, U.S.	
95	Win	51–11–12 (21)	Babe Herman	UD	15	Dec 18, 1925	Madison Square Garden, Manhattan, New York City, New York, U.S.	Retained NYSAC and The Ring featherweight titles
94	Draw	50–11–12 (21)	Babe Herman	PTS	15	Aug 27, 1925	Brassco Park, Waterbury, Connecticut, U.S.	Retained NYSAC and The Ring featherweight titles
93	Win	50–11–11 (21)	Billy Kennedy	NWS	10	Aug 5, 1925	Bayonne Stadium, Bayonne, New Jersey, U.S.	
92	Win	50–11–11 (20)	Frankie Schaeffer	NWS	10	Jun 26, 1925	Aurora Bowl, Aurora, Illinois, U.S.	
91	Win	50–11–11 (19)	Steve Sullivan	TKO	5 (10)	May 22, 1925	Brassco Park, Waterbury, Connecticut, U.S.	
90	Win	49–11–11 (19)	Ernie Goozeman	NWS	12	Mar 28, 1925	Coliseum, San Diego, California, U.S.	
89	Win	49–11–11 (18)	Johnny Farr	NWS	12	Mar 11, 1925	Auditorium, Oakland, California, U.S.	
88	Win	49–11–11 (17)	Bud Ridley	NWS	12	Feb 10, 1925	Arena, Vernon, California, U.S.	
87	Win	49–11–11 (16)	Danny Kramer	TKO	9 (15)	Jan 2, 1925	Madison Square Garden, Manhattan, New York City, New York, U.S.	Won vacant NYSAC and inaugural The Ring featherweight titles
86	Win	48–11–11 (16)	Jose Lombardo	KO	4 (12)	Dec 12, 1924	Madison Square Garden, Manhattan, New York City, New York, U.S.	
85	Win	47–11–11 (16)	Bobby Garcia	PTS	10	Nov 21, 1924	Madison Square Garden, Manhattan, New York City, New York, U.S.	
84	Win	46–11–11 (16)	Angel Diaz	KO	3 (?)	Oct 10, 1924	Madison Square Garden, Manhattan, New York City, New York, U.S.	
83	Win	45–11–11 (16)	Lou Paluso	PTS	12	Sep 15, 1924	Brassco Park, Waterbury, Connecticut, U.S.	
82	Win	44–11–11 (16)	Pal Moran	DQ	9 (12)	Aug 21, 1924	Weiss Park, Hamden, Connecticut, U.S.	Moran disqualified for "not trying"
81	Win	43–11–11 (16)	Bobby Garcia	PTS	12	Jun 9, 1924	Weiss Park, Hamden, Connecticut, U.S.	
80	Draw	42–11–11 (16)	Cuddy DeMarco	PTS	12	Apr 24, 1924	State Armory, Waterbury, Connecticut, U.S.	
79	Draw	42–11–10 (16)	Bobby Garcia	PTS	12	Mar 20, 1924	State Armory, Waterbury, Connecticut, U.S.	
78	Win	42–11–9 (16)	Cuddy DeMarco	PTS	12	Feb 21, 1924	State Armory, Waterbury, Connecticut, U.S.	
77	Win	41–11–9 (16)	Eddie Brady	UD	12	Feb 1, 1924	Madison Square Garden, Manhattan, New York City, New York, U.S.	
76	Draw	40–11–9 (16)	Cuddy DeMarco	PTS	10	Jan 7, 1924	Motor Square Garden, Pittsburgh, Pennsylvania, U.S.	
75	Win	40–11–8 (16)	Allentown Johnny Leonard	PTS	12	Dec 13, 1923	State Armory, Waterbury, Connecticut, U.S.	
74	Win	39–11–8 (16)	Jimmy Goodrich	PTS	10	Sep 28, 1923	Madison Square Garden, Manhattan, New York City, New York, U.S.	
73	Win	38–11–8 (16)	Tommy Noble	TKO	7 (10)	Aug 9, 1923	Velodrome, Manhattan, New York City, New York, U.S.	
72	Draw	37–11–8 (16)	Babe Herman	PTS	12	Jul 3, 1923	Weiss Park, Hamden, Connecticut, U.S.	
71	Draw	37–11–7 (16)	Babe Herman	PTS	12	Jun 12, 1923	Queensboro Stadium, Long Island City, Queens, New York City, New York, U.S.	
70	Draw	37–11–6 (16)	Babe Herman	PTS	8	Jun 2, 1923	Polo Grounds, Manhattan, New York City, New York, U.S.	
69	Win	37–11–5 (16)	Danny Frush	KO	6 (?)	May 17, 1923	Queensboro Stadium, Long Island City, Queens, New York City, New York, U.S.	
68	Win	36–11–5 (16)	Harvey Bright	PTS	12	Apr 16, 1923	City Hall Auditorium, Meriden, Connecticut, U.S.	
67	Loss	35–11–5 (16)	Al Shubert	PTS	12	Mar 14, 1923	Foot Guard Hall, Hartford, Connecticut, U.S.	
66	Win	35–10–5 (16)	Babe Herman	PTS	12	Mar 8, 1923	State Armory, Meriden, Connecticut, U.S.	
65	Win	34–10–5 (16)	Mickey Travers	PTS	12	Jan 15, 1923	City Hall Auditorium, Meriden, Connecticut, U.S.	
64	Loss	33–10–5 (16)	Babe Herman	PTS	12	Dec 18, 1922	City Hall Auditorium, Meriden, Connecticut, U.S.	
63	Win	33–9–5 (16)	Steve Sullivan	UD	12	Nov 24, 1922	Madison Square Garden, Manhattan, New York City, New York, U.S.	
62	Win	32–9–5 (16)	Gene Delmont	PTS	12	Nov 14, 1922	Casino Hall, Bridgeport, Connecticut, U.S.	
61	Win	31–9–5 (16)	Andy Chaney	PTS	12	Oct 20, 1922	Weiss Park, Hamden, Connecticut, U.S.	
60	Win	30–9–5 (16)	Johnny Shugrue	PTS	12	Sep 14, 1922	Hanover Park, Meriden, Connecticut, U.S.	
59	Win	29–9–5 (16)	Eddie Wagner	PTS	12	Aug 10, 1922	Hanover Park, Meriden, Connecticut, U.S.	
58	Win	28–9–5 (16)	Earl Baird	DQ	8 (12)	Jun 29, 1922	State Street Arena, Bridgeport, Connecticut, U.S.	Baird was disqualified for hitting low
57	Loss	27–9–5 (16)	Eddie Wagner	PTS	12	Jun 9, 1922	City Hall Auditorium, Meriden, Connecticut, U.S.	
56	Win	27–8–5 (16)	Earl Baird	PTS	12	May 29, 1922	State Street Arena, Bridgeport, Connecticut, U.S.	
55	Win	26–8–5 (16)	Johnny Lisse	PTS	12	May 13, 1922	City Hall Auditorium, Meriden, Connecticut, U.S.	
54	Win	25–8–5 (16)	Johnny Williams	NWS	12	Apr 18, 1922	Portland, Maine, U.S.	
53	Win	25–8–5 (15)	Dick Russell	PTS	10	Apr 10, 1922	Casino A.C., Lynn, Massachusetts, U.S.	
52	Win	24–8–5 (15)	Hughie Hutchinson	PTS	12	Apr 1, 1922	City Hall Auditorium, Meriden, Connecticut, U.S.	
51	Win	23–8–5 (15)	Artie Rose	TKO	2 (12)	Mar 20, 1922	City Hall Auditorium, Meriden, Connecticut, U.S.	
50	Win	22–8–5 (15)	Knockout Al Wagner	PTS	8	Mar 13, 1922	Madison Square Garden, Manhattan, New York City, New York, U.S.	
49	Draw	21–8–5 (15)	Jackie Coburn	PTS	6	Mar 6, 1922	Broadway Arena, Brooklyn, New York City, New York, U.S.	
48	Draw	21–8–4 (15)	Mickey Travers	PTS	12	Mar 2, 1922	Music Hall, New Haven, Connecticut, U.S.	
47	Draw	21–8–3 (15)	Hughie Hutchinson	PTS	12	Feb 25, 1922	City Hall Auditorium, Meriden, Connecticut, U.S.	
46	Win	21–8–2 (15)	Dick Russell	RTD	2 (10)	Feb 13, 1922	Casino Hall, Lynn, Massachusetts, U.S.	
45	Win	20–8–2 (15)	Jimmy Dwyer	PTS	12	Nov 29, 1921	City Hall Auditorium, Meriden, Connecticut, U.S.	
44	Win	19–8–2 (15)	Freddie Jacks	PTS	12	Nov 19, 1921	City Hall Auditorium, Meriden, Connecticut, U.S.	
43	Win	18–8–2 (15)	Dutch Brandt	PTS	12	Oct 31, 1921	Church Street Auditorium, Hartford, Connecticut, U.S.	
42	Win	17–8–2 (15)	Al Shubert	PTS	12	Oct 24, 1921	Church Street Auditorium, Hartford, Connecticut, U.S.	
41	Win	16–8–2 (15)	Billy DeFoe	DQ	5 (12)	Oct 10, 1921	City Hall Auditorium, Meriden, Connecticut, U.S.	DeFoe was disqualified for hitting low
40	Win	15–8–2 (15)	Pete McDonald	PTS	12	Sep 23, 1921	City Hall Auditorium, Meriden, Connecticut, U.S.	
39	Win	14–8–2 (15)	Billy Murphy	PTS	12	Sep 2, 1921	City Hall Auditorium, Meriden, Connecticut, U.S.	
38	Win	13–8–2 (15)	Kid Lewis	PTS	12	Aug 19, 1921	City Hall Auditorium, Meriden, Connecticut, U.S.	
37	Win	12–8–2 (15)	Sammy Waltz	PTS	12	Jul 1, 1921	City Hall Auditorium, Meriden, Connecticut, U.S.	
36	Win	11–8–2 (15)	Jack Cunningham	TKO	1 (8)	Jun 9, 1921	Church Street Auditorium, Hartford, Connecticut, U.S.	
35	Win	10–8–2 (15)	Romeo Roche	PTS	10	May 14, 1921	Grand Theatre, Hartford, Connecticut, U.S.	
34	Win	9–8–2 (15)	Joe Currie	NWS	8	Apr 7, 1921	Armory, Wallingford, Connecticut, U.S.	
33	Win	9–8–2 (14)	Terry O'Connor	DQ	5 (8)	Mar 31, 1921	Church Street Auditorium, Hartford, Massachusetts, U.S.	O'Connor disqualified for excessive holding
32	Loss	8–8–2 (14)	Romeo Roche	PTS	10	Mar 11, 1921	City Hall, Holyoke, Massachusetts, U.S.	
31	Loss	8–7–2 (14)	Romeo Roche	PTS	10	Feb 25, 1921	City Hall, Holyoke, Massachusetts, U.S.	
30	Win	8–6–2 (14)	Johnny Williams	NWS	8	Feb 21, 1921	Church Street Auditorium, Hartford, Connecticut, U.S.	
29	Loss	8–6–2 (13)	Jimmy Dwyer	PTS	8	Feb 3, 1921	Foot Guard Hall, Hartford, Connecticut, U.S.	
28	Loss	8–5–2 (13)	Mickey Travers	PTS	10	Dec 27, 1920	Arena, New Haven, Connecticut, U.S.	
27	Loss	8–4–2 (13)	Johnny Shugrue	PTS	12	Dec 11, 1920	Phoenix Arena, Waterbury, Connecticut, U.S.	
26	Draw	8–3–2 (13)	Irish Kid Williams	PTS	8	Dec 4, 1920	Phoenix Arena, Waterbury, Connecticut, U.S.	
25	Win	8–3–1 (13)	Artie O'Leary	TKO	6 (6)	Nov 12, 1920	Trades Council Hall, Wallingford, Connecticut, U.S.	
24	Win	7–3–1 (13)	Joe Hall	PTS	8	Nov 6, 1920	City Hall Auditorium, Meriden, Connecticut, U.S.	
23	NC	6–3–1 (13)	Mickey Travers	NC	5 (?)	Aug 17, 1920	Majestic Roof Garden, Norwich, Connecticut, U.S.	
22	Draw	6–3–1 (12)	Mickey Travers	PTS	8	Aug 14, 1920	Hanover Park, Meriden, Connecticut, U.S.	
21	Win	6–3 (12)	Johnny Gray	KO	10 (10)	Jun 18, 1920	New Atlas A.C., Chicopee, Massachusetts, U.S.	
20	Win	5–3 (12)	Jimmy Farren	PTS	10	Jun 10, 1920	Casino A.C., Lynn, Massachusetts, U.S.	
19	Draw	4–3 (12)	George Proto	NWS	6	May 29, 1920	Phoenix Arena, Waterbury, Connecticut, U.S.	
18	Loss	4–3 (11)	Mickey Travers	PTS	6	Apr 29, 1920	Auditorium, Waterbury, Connecticut, U.S.	
17	Loss	4–2 (11)	Mickey Travers	PTS	10	Apr 13, 1920	Arena, New Haven, Connecticut, U.S.	
16	Win	4–1 (11)	Battling Green	TKO	7 (10)	Mar 29, 1920	City Hall Auditorium, Meriden, Connecticut, U.S.	
15	Win	3–1 (11)	George Smith	TKO	3 (?)	Mar 4, 1920	Music Hall, New Haven, Connecticut, U.S.	
14	Draw	2–1 (11)	Eddie Ford	NWS	8	Feb 21, 1920	City Hall Auditorium, Meriden, Connecticut, U.S.	
13	Win	2–1 (10)	Johnny (KO) Romano	NWS	6	Jan 22, 1920	Bandeck's Hall, New Britain, Connecticut, U.S.	
12	Win	2–1 (9)	Battling Harris	NWS	6	Dec 27, 1919	Phoenix Arena, Waterbury, Connecticut, U.S.	
11	Win	2–1 (8)	George Hebor	TKO	4 (6)	Dec 18, 1919	Arena, New Haven, Connecticut, U.S.	
10	Win	1–1 (8)	Frankie Mack	NWS	6	Dec 1, 1919	Crown Theater, Hartford, Connecticut, U.S.	
9	Win	1–1 (7)	Terry O'Connor	NWS	6	Oct 30, 1919	Middletown A.C., Middletown, Connecticut, U.S.	
8	ND	1–1 (6)	Kid Black	ND	6	Oct 20, 1919	4th Regiment Armory, Jersey City, New Jersey, U.S.	Precise date of bout unknown at this time
7	ND	1–1 (5)	Tommy Shea	ND	6 (?)	Oct 15, 1919	Jersey City, New Jersey, U.S.	Precise date of bout unknown at this time
6	ND	1–1 (4)	Happy Gorman	ND	6	Sep 2, 1919	Jersey City, New Jersey, U.S.	Precise date of bout unknown at this time
5	ND	1–1 (3)	Young Dempsey	ND	4	Sep 1, 1919	4th Regiment Armory, Jersey City, New Jersey, U.S.	Precise date of bout unknown at this time
4	Draw	1–1 (2)	Battling Lewis	NWS	6	Nov 18, 1918	Trenton, New Jersey, U.S.	
3	Loss	1–1 (1)	George Proto	PTS	6	Apr 29, 1918	Arena, New Haven, Connecticut, U.S.	
2	Win	1–0 (1)	Frankie Mack	NWS	4	Mar 21, 1918	Lenox Hall, Meriden, Connecticut, U.S.	
1	Win	1–0	Young Rocco	KO	1 (6)	Mar 7, 1918	Lenox Hall, Meriden, Connecticut, U.S.	

=== Unofficial record ===
164 fights	121 wins	22 losses
By knockout	27	3
By decision	89	18
By disqualification	5	1
Draws	16	
No contests	5	

Record with the inclusion of newspaper decisions to the win/loss/draw column.

No.	Result	Record	Opponent	Type	Round(s)	Date	Location	Notes
164	Loss	121–22–16 (5)	Herbert Lewis Hardwick	PTS	10	Feb 20, 1933	Arena, New Haven, Connecticut, U.S.	
163	Win	121–21–16 (5)	Eddie Holmes	PTS	10	Oct 13, 1932	Foot Guard Hall, Hartford, Connecticut, U.S.	
162	Loss	120–21–16 (5)	Pancho Villa	SD	10	Sep 9, 1932	Casino, Fall River, Massachusetts, U.S.	
161	Win	120–20–16 (5)	Frankie Petrolle	PTS	8	Aug 4, 1932	Yankee Stadium, Bronx, New York City, New York, U.S.	
160	Win	119–20–16 (5)	Emil Rossi	PTS	8	Jul 19, 1932	Queensboro Stadium, Long Island City, Queens, New York City, New York, U.S.	
159	Win	118–20–16 (5)	Jackie Pilkington	PTS	10	Jun 29, 1932	Hurley Stadium, East Hartford, Connecticut, U.S.	
158	Loss	117–20–16 (5)	Eddie Ran	KO	1 (8)	Nov 20, 1931	Madison Square Garden, Manhattan, New York City, New York, U.S.	
157	Win	117–19–16 (5)	Harry Dublinsky	PTS	8	Nov 4, 1931	Chicago Stadium, Chicago, Illinois, U.S.	
156	Win	116–19–16 (5)	Pancho Villa	KO	9 (10)	Oct 12, 1931	Valley Arena, Holyoke, Massachusetts, U.S.	
155	Win	115–19–16 (5)	Jackie Pilkington	PTS	10	Sep 8, 1931	Capital Park Stadium, Hartford, Connecticut, U.S.	Won vacant New England lightweight title
154	Win	114–19–16 (5)	Sammy Mandell	PTS	10	Aug 24, 1931	Hurley Stadium, East Hartford, Connecticut, U.S.	
153	Win	113–19–16 (5)	Tommy Jarrett	PTS	10	Jul 23, 1931	Meadowbrook Arena, North Adams, Massachusetts, U.S.	
152	Win	112–19–16 (5)	Ralph Lenny	PTS	10	Apr 20, 1931	State Armory, Hartford, Connecticut, U.S.	
151	Win	111–19–16 (5)	Billy Lynch	PTS	10	Apr 6, 1931	Foot Guard Hall, Hartford, Connecticut, U.S.	
150	Win	110–19–16 (5)	Buster Brown	PTS	10	Mar 16, 1931	104th Medical Regiment Armory, Baltimore, Maryland, U.S.	
149	Win	109–19–16 (5)	Tommy Crowley	TKO	6 (10)	Mar 4, 1931	Columbus Civic Center, Rochester, New York, U.S.	
148	Win	108–19–16 (5)	Jack Portney	PTS	10	Feb 4, 1931	Arena, New Haven, Connecticut, U.S.	
147	Loss	107–19–16 (5)	Justo Suárez	PTS	10	Oct 17, 1930	Madison Square Garden, Manhattan, New York City, New York, U.S.	
146	Win	107–18–16 (5)	Christopher Battalino	PTS	10	Sep 24, 1930	Hurley Stadium, East Hartford, Connecticut, U.S.	
145	Win	106–18–16 (5)	Jimmy O'Brien	TKO	9 (10)	Aug 9, 1930	Walnut Beach Stadium, Milford, Connecticut, U.S.	
144	Win	105–18–16 (5)	Maurice Holtzer	PTS	10	Jun 30, 1930	Heywood Arena, West Springfield, Massachusetts, U.S.	
143	Win	104–18–16 (5)	Tommy Crowley	PTS	10	Jun 19, 1930	Lakewood Arena, Waterbury, Connecticut, U.S.	
142	Win	103–18–16 (5)	Joey Medill	PTS	10	Jun 2, 1930	Hurley Stadium, East Hartford, Connecticut, U.S.	
141	Win	102–18–16 (5)	Johnny Farr	PTS	10	Mar 18, 1930	Arena, New Haven, Connecticut, U.S.	
140	Loss	101–18–16 (5)	Jack Portney	PTS	10	Feb 24, 1930	104th Regiment Armory, Baltimore, Maryland, U.S.	
139	Win	101–17–16 (5)	Andy Callahan	PTS	10	Dec 13, 1929	Arena, New Haven, Connecticut, U.S.	
138	Win	100–17–16 (5)	Emory Cabana	PTS	10	Nov 19, 1929	Arena, New Haven, Connecticut, U.S.	
137	Win	99–17–16 (5)	Eddie Wolfe	TKO	8 (10)	Oct 30, 1929	Coliseum, Chicago, Illinois, U.S.	
136	Loss	98–17–16 (5)	Emory Cabana	PTS	10	Sep 17, 1929	Arena, New Haven, Connecticut, U.S.	
135	Win	98–16–16 (5)	Henri Dewancker	TKO	7 (12)	Sep 9, 1929	Carlin's Park, Baltimore, Maryland, U.S.	
134	Win	97–16–16 (5)	Joe Trabon	PTS	10	Aug 22, 1929	Lakewood Arena, Waterbury, Connecticut, U.S.	
133	Win	96–16–16 (5)	Billy Wallace	PTS	10	May 10, 1929	Madison Square Garden, Manhattan, New York City, New York, U.S.	
132	Win	95–16–16 (5)	Joey Medill	PTS	10	Apr 11, 1929	Olympia Stadium, Detroit, Michigan, U.S.	
131	Win	94–16–16 (5)	Joe Glick	PTS	10	Apr 2, 1929	Arena, New Haven, Connecticut, U.S.	
130	Loss	93–16–16 (5)	Freddie Mueller	DQ	8 (10)	Feb 26, 1929	Arena, New Haven, Connecticut, U.S.	Kaplan was disqualified following a low blow
129	Win	93–15–16 (5)	Phil McGraw	PTS	10	Feb 14, 1929	State Armory, Waterbury, Connecticut, U.S.	
128	Win	92–15–16 (5)	Johnny Jadick	DQ	7 (10)	Jan 11, 1929	Boston Garden, Boston, Massachusetts, U.S.	Jadick was disqualified for persistent holding
127	Win	91–15–16 (5)	Ritchie King	PTS	10	Jan 1, 1929	Arena, Philadelphia, Pennsylvania, U.S.	
126	Win	90–15–16 (5)	Bruce Flowers	PTS	10	Oct 16, 1928	Arena, New Haven, Connecticut, U.S.	
125	Win	89–15–16 (5)	Bert Lamb	KO	7 (10)	Sep 21, 1928	Olympia Stadium, Detroit, Michigan, U.S.	
124	Loss	88–15–16 (5)	Manuel Quintero	PTS	10	Jul 2, 1928	White City Stadium, West Haven, Connecticut, U.S.	
123	Loss	88–14–16 (5)	Manuel Quintero	PTS	10	May 31, 1928	Madison Square Garden, Manhattan, New York City, New York, U.S.	
122	Win	88–13–16 (5)	Georgie Day	PTS	10	May 8, 1928	Arena, New Haven, Connecticut, U.S.	
121	Win	87–13–16 (5)	Joe Trabon	PTS	10	Feb 27, 1928	Edgerton Park Arena, Rochester, New York, U.S.	
120	Win	86–13–16 (5)	Bobby Mays	PTS	10	Feb 20, 1928	Arena, New Haven, Connecticut, U.S.	
119	Win	85–13–16 (5)	Mike Dundee	PTS	12	Nov 1, 1927	Arena, New Haven, Connecticut, U.S.	
118	Loss	84–13–16 (5)	Jimmy McLarnin	KO	8 (10)	Oct 18, 1927	Coliseum, Chicago, Illinois, U.S.	
117	Win	84–12–16 (5)	Tommy Cello	PTS	10	Oct 11, 1927	St. Nicholas Arena, Manhattan, New York City, New York, U.S.	
116	Win	83–12–16 (5)	Clicky Clark	TKO	5 (12)	Sep 8, 1927	Arena, New Haven, Connecticut, U.S.	
115	Win	82–12–16 (5)	Bruce Flowers	PTS	10	Jun 29, 1927	Queensboro Stadium, Long Island City, Queens, New York City, New York, U.S.	
114	Win	81–12–16 (5)	Jackie Fields	PTS	10	Jun 15, 1927	Polo Grounds, Manhattan, New York City, New York, U.S.	
113	Win	80–12–16 (5)	Al Foreman	PTS	10	May 9, 1927	Arena, Philadelphia, Pennsylvania, U.S.	
112	Win	79–12–16 (5)	Tony Vaccarelli	TKO	8 (12)	May 2, 1927	Arena, New Haven, Connecticut, U.S.	
111	Win	78–12–16 (5)	Johnny Ceccoli	PTS	10	Apr 4, 1927	Arena, Philadelphia, Pennsylvania, U.S.	
110	Win	77–12–16 (5)	Jackie Brady	PTS	10	Mar 28, 1927	Convention Hall, Rochester, New York, U.S.	
109	Win	76–12–16 (5)	Frankie Fink	TKO	8 (10)	Mar 18, 1927	Madison Square Garden, Manhattan, New York City, New York, U.S.	
108	Win	75–12–16 (5)	Lou Paluso	PTS	12	Jan 17, 1927	Public Hall, Cleveland, Ohio, U.S.	
107	Win	74–12–16 (5)	Paris Cangey	KO	4 (10)	Jan 10, 1927	Convention Hall, Rochester, New York, U.S.	
106	Loss	73–12–16 (5)	Billy Wallace	KO	5 (15)	Dec 2, 1926	Public Hall, Cleveland, Ohio, U.S.	
105	Win	73–11–16 (5)	Tommy Cello	PTS	10	Nov 5, 1926	Valley Arena, Holyoke, Massachusetts, U.S.	
104	Win	72–11–16 (5)	Tommy Cello	PTS	10	Aug 3, 1926	Queensboro Stadium, Long Island City, Queens, New York City, New York, U.S.	
103	Win	71–11–16 (5)	Bobby Garcia	TKO	10 (15)	Jun 28, 1926	Hurley Stadium, Hartford, Connecticut, U.S.	Retained NYSAC and The Ring featherweight titles
102	Win	70–11–16 (5)	Billy White	NWS	10	Jun 4, 1926	Boyle's Thirty Acres, Jersey City, New Jersey, U.S.	
101	Win	69–11–16 (5)	Leo Roy	KO	7 (10)	Apr 21, 1926	Forum, Montreal, Quebec, Canada	
100	Win	68–11–16 (5)	Mickey Chapin	UD	10	Apr 12, 1926	Town Hall, Scranton, Pennsylvania, U.S.	
99	Win	67–11–16 (5)	Tommy Herman	PTS	12	Mar 26, 1926	104th Medical Regiment Armory, Baltimore, Maryland, U.S.	
98	Draw	66–11–16 (5)	Eddie Wagner	PTS	10	Mar 8, 1926	Arena, Philadelphia, Pennsylvania, U.S.	
97	Win	66–11–15 (5)	Billy Petrolle	PTS	12	Mar 1, 1926	Mechanics Building, Boston, Massachusetts, U.S.	
96	Win	65–11–15 (5)	Billy Murphy	PTS	10	Jan 25, 1926	Mechanics Building, Boston, Massachusetts, U.S.	
95	Win	64–11–15 (5)	Babe Herman	UD	15	Dec 18, 1925	Madison Square Garden, Manhattan, New York City, New York, U.S.	Retained NYSAC and The Ring featherweight titles
94	Draw	63–11–15 (5)	Babe Herman	PTS	15	Aug 27, 1925	Brassco Park, Waterbury, Connecticut, U.S.	Retained NYSAC and The Ring featherweight titles
93	Win	63–11–14 (5)	Billy Kennedy	NWS	10	Aug 5, 1925	Bayonne Stadium, Bayonne, New Jersey, U.S.	
92	Win	62–11–14 (5)	Frankie Schaeffer	NWS	10	Jun 26, 1925	Aurora Bowl, Aurora, Illinois, U.S.	
91	Win	61–11–14 (5)	Steve Sullivan	TKO	5 (10)	May 22, 1925	Brassco Park, Waterbury, Connecticut, U.S.	
90	Win	60–11–14 (5)	Ernie Goozeman	NWS	12	Mar 28, 1925	Coliseum, San Diego, California, U.S.	
89	Win	59–11–14 (5)	Johnny Farr	NWS	12	Mar 11, 1925	Auditorium, Oakland, California, U.S.	
88	Win	58–11–14 (5)	Bud Ridley	NWS	12	Feb 10, 1925	Arena, Vernon, California, U.S.	
87	Win	57–11–14 (5)	Danny Kramer	TKO	9 (15)	Jan 2, 1925	Madison Square Garden, Manhattan, New York City, New York, U.S.	Won vacant NYSAC and inaugural The Ring featherweight titles
86	Win	56–11–14 (5)	Jose Lombardo	KO	4 (12)	Dec 12, 1924	Madison Square Garden, Manhattan, New York City, New York, U.S.	
85	Win	55–11–14 (5)	Bobby Garcia	PTS	10	Nov 21, 1924	Madison Square Garden, Manhattan, New York City, New York, U.S.	
84	Win	54–11–14 (5)	Angel Diaz	KO	3 (?)	Oct 10, 1924	Madison Square Garden, Manhattan, New York City, New York, U.S.	
83	Win	53–11–14 (5)	Lou Paluso	PTS	12	Sep 15, 1924	Brassco Park, Waterbury, Connecticut, U.S.	
82	Win	52–11–14 (5)	Pal Moran	DQ	9 (12)	Aug 21, 1924	Weiss Park, Hamden, Connecticut, U.S.	Moran disqualified for "not trying"
81	Win	51–11–14 (5)	Bobby Garcia	PTS	12	Jun 9, 1924	Weiss Park, Hamden, Connecticut, U.S.	
80	Draw	50–11–14 (5)	Cuddy DeMarco	PTS	12	Apr 24, 1924	State Armory, Waterbury, Connecticut, U.S.	
79	Draw	50–11–13 (5)	Bobby Garcia	PTS	12	Mar 20, 1924	State Armory, Waterbury, Connecticut, U.S.	
78	Win	50–11–12 (5)	Cuddy DeMarco	PTS	12	Feb 21, 1924	State Armory, Waterbury, Connecticut, U.S.	
77	Win	49–11–12 (5)	Eddie Brady	UD	12	Feb 1, 1924	Madison Square Garden, Manhattan, New York City, New York, U.S.	
76	Draw	48–11–12 (5)	Cuddy DeMarco	PTS	10	Jan 7, 1924	Motor Square Garden, Pittsburgh, Pennsylvania, U.S.	
75	Win	48–11–11 (5)	Allentown Johnny Leonard	PTS	12	Dec 13, 1923	State Armory, Waterbury, Connecticut, U.S.	
74	Win	47–11–11 (5)	Jimmy Goodrich	PTS	10	Sep 28, 1923	Madison Square Garden, Manhattan, New York City, New York, U.S.	
73	Win	46–11–11 (5)	Tommy Noble	TKO	7 (10)	Aug 9, 1923	Velodrome, Manhattan, New York City, New York, U.S.	
72	Draw	45–11–11 (5)	Babe Herman	PTS	12	Jul 3, 1923	Weiss Park, Hamden, Connecticut, U.S.	
71	Draw	45–11–10 (5)	Babe Herman	PTS	12	Jun 12, 1923	Queensboro Stadium, Long Island City, Queens, New York City, New York, U.S.	
70	Draw	45–11–9 (5)	Babe Herman	PTS	8	Jun 2, 1923	Polo Grounds, Manhattan, New York City, New York, U.S.	
69	Win	45–11–8 (5)	Danny Frush	KO	6 (?)	May 17, 1923	Queensboro Stadium, Long Island City, Queens, New York City, New York, U.S.	
68	Win	44–11–8 (5)	Harvey Bright	PTS	12	Apr 16, 1923	City Hall Auditorium, Meriden, Connecticut, U.S.	
67	Loss	43–11–8 (5)	Al Shubert	PTS	12	Mar 14, 1923	Foot Guard Hall, Hartford, Connecticut, U.S.	
66	Win	43–10–8 (5)	Babe Herman	PTS	12	Mar 8, 1923	State Armory, Meriden, Connecticut, U.S.	
65	Win	42–10–8 (5)	Mickey Travers	PTS	12	Jan 15, 1923	City Hall Auditorium, Meriden, Connecticut, U.S.	
64	Loss	41–10–8 (5)	Babe Herman	PTS	12	Dec 18, 1922	City Hall Auditorium, Meriden, Connecticut, U.S.	
63	Win	41–9–8 (5)	Steve Sullivan	UD	12	Nov 24, 1922	Madison Square Garden, Manhattan, New York City, New York, U.S.	
62	Win	40–9–8 (5)	Gene Delmont	PTS	12	Nov 14, 1922	Casino Hall, Bridgeport, Connecticut, U.S.	
61	Win	39–9–8 (5)	Andy Chaney	PTS	12	Oct 20, 1922	Weiss Park, Hamden, Connecticut, U.S.	
60	Win	38–9–8 (5)	Johnny Shugrue	PTS	12	Sep 14, 1922	Hanover Park, Meriden, Connecticut, U.S.	
59	Win	37–9–8 (5)	Eddie Wagner	PTS	12	Aug 10, 1922	Hanover Park, Meriden, Connecticut, U.S.	
58	Win	36–9–8 (5)	Earl Baird	DQ	8 (12)	Jun 29, 1922	State Street Arena, Bridgeport, Connecticut, U.S.	Baird was disqualified for hitting low
57	Loss	35–9–8 (5)	Eddie Wagner	PTS	12	Jun 9, 1922	City Hall Auditorium, Meriden, Connecticut, U.S.	
56	Win	35–8–8 (5)	Earl Baird	PTS	12	May 29, 1922	State Street Arena, Bridgeport, Connecticut, U.S.	
55	Win	34–8–8 (5)	Johnny Lisse	PTS	12	May 13, 1922	City Hall Auditorium, Meriden, Connecticut, U.S.	
54	Win	33–8–8 (5)	Johnny Williams	NWS	12	Apr 18, 1922	Portland, Maine, U.S.	
53	Win	32–8–8 (5)	Dick Russell	PTS	10	Apr 10, 1922	Casino A.C., Lynn, Massachusetts, U.S.	
52	Win	31–8–8 (5)	Hughie Hutchinson	PTS	12	Apr 1, 1922	City Hall Auditorium, Meriden, Connecticut, U.S.	
51	Win	30–8–8 (5)	Artie Rose	TKO	2 (12)	Mar 20, 1922	City Hall Auditorium, Meriden, Connecticut, U.S.	
50	Win	29–8–8 (5)	Knockout Al Wagner	PTS	8	Mar 13, 1922	Madison Square Garden, Manhattan, New York City, New York, U.S.	
49	Draw	28–8–8 (5)	Jackie Coburn	PTS	6	Mar 6, 1922	Broadway Arena, Brooklyn, New York City, New York, U.S.	
48	Draw	28–8–7 (5)	Mickey Travers	PTS	12	Mar 2, 1922	Music Hall, New Haven, Connecticut, U.S.	
47	Draw	28–8–6 (5)	Hughie Hutchinson	PTS	12	Feb 25, 1922	City Hall Auditorium, Meriden, Connecticut, U.S.	
46	Win	28–8–5 (5)	Dick Russell	RTD	2 (10)	Feb 13, 1922	Casino Hall, Lynn, Massachusetts, U.S.	
45	Win	27–8–5 (5)	Jimmy Dwyer	PTS	12	Nov 29, 1921	City Hall Auditorium, Meriden, Connecticut, U.S.	
44	Win	26–8–5 (5)	Freddie Jacks	PTS	12	Nov 19, 1921	City Hall Auditorium, Meriden, Connecticut, U.S.	
43	Win	25–8–5 (5)	Dutch Brandt	PTS	12	Oct 31, 1921	Church Street Auditorium, Hartford, Connecticut, U.S.	
42	Win	24–8–5 (5)	Al Shubert	PTS	12	Oct 24, 1921	Church Street Auditorium, Hartford, Connecticut, U.S.	
41	Win	23–8–5 (5)	Billy DeFoe	DQ	5 (12)	Oct 10, 1921	City Hall Auditorium, Meriden, Connecticut, U.S.	DeFoe was disqualified for hitting low
40	Win	22–8–5 (5)	Pete McDonald	PTS	12	Sep 23, 1921	City Hall Auditorium, Meriden, Connecticut, U.S.	
39	Win	21–8–5 (5)	Billy Murphy	PTS	12	Sep 2, 1921	City Hall Auditorium, Meriden, Connecticut, U.S.	
38	Win	20–8–5 (5)	Kid Lewis	PTS	12	Aug 19, 1921	City Hall Auditorium, Meriden, Connecticut, U.S.	
37	Win	19–8–5 (5)	Sammy Waltz	PTS	12	Jul 1, 1921	City Hall Auditorium, Meriden, Connecticut, U.S.	
36	Win	18–8–5 (5)	Jack Cunningham	TKO	1 (8)	Jun 9, 1921	Church Street Auditorium, Hartford, Connecticut, U.S.	
35	Win	17–8–5 (5)	Romeo Roche	PTS	10	May 14, 1921	Grand Theatre, Hartford, Connecticut, U.S.	
34	Win	16–8–5 (5)	Joe Currie	NWS	8	Apr 7, 1921	Armory, Wallingford, Connecticut, U.S.	
33	Win	15–8–5 (5)	Terry O'Connor	DQ	5 (8)	Mar 31, 1921	Church Street Auditorium, Hartford, Massachusetts, U.S.	O'Connor disqualified for excessive holding
32	Loss	14–8–5 (5)	Romeo Roche	PTS	10	Mar 11, 1921	City Hall, Holyoke, Massachusetts, U.S.	
31	Loss	14–7–5 (5)	Romeo Roche	PTS	10	Feb 25, 1921	City Hall, Holyoke, Massachusetts, U.S.	
30	Win	14–6–5 (5)	Johnny Williams	NWS	8	Feb 21, 1921	Church Street Auditorium, Hartford, Connecticut, U.S.	
29	Loss	13–6–5 (5)	Jimmy Dwyer	PTS	8	Feb 3, 1921	Foot Guard Hall, Hartford, Connecticut, U.S.	
28	Loss	13–5–5 (5)	Mickey Travers	PTS	10	Dec 27, 1920	Arena, New Haven, Connecticut, U.S.	
27	Loss	13–4–5 (5)	Johnny Shugrue	PTS	12	Dec 11, 1920	Phoenix Arena, Waterbury, Connecticut, U.S.	
26	Draw	13–3–5 (5)	Irish Kid Williams	PTS	8	Dec 4, 1920	Phoenix Arena, Waterbury, Connecticut, U.S.	
25	Win	13–3–4 (5)	Artie O'Leary	TKO	6 (6)	Nov 12, 1920	Trades Council Hall, Wallingford, Connecticut, U.S.	
24	Win	12–3–4 (5)	Joe Hall	PTS	8	Nov 6, 1920	City Hall Auditorium, Meriden, Connecticut, U.S.	
23	NC	11–3–4 (5)	Mickey Travers	NC	5 (?)	Aug 17, 1920	Majestic Roof Garden, Norwich, Connecticut, U.S.	
22	Draw	11–3–4 (4)	Mickey Travers	PTS	8	Aug 14, 1920	Hanover Park, Meriden, Connecticut, U.S.	
21	Win	11–3–3 (4)	Johnny Gray	KO	10 (10)	Jun 18, 1920	New Atlas A.C., Chicopee, Massachusetts, U.S.	
20	Win	10–3–3 (4)	Jimmy Farren	PTS	10	Jun 10, 1920	Casino A.C., Lynn, Massachusetts, U.S.	
19	Draw	9–3–3 (4)	George Proto	NWS	6	May 29, 1920	Phoenix Arena, Waterbury, Connecticut, U.S.	
18	Loss	9–3–2 (4)	Mickey Travers	PTS	6	Apr 29, 1920	Auditorium, Waterbury, Connecticut, U.S.	
17	Loss	9–2–2 (4)	Mickey Travers	PTS	10	Apr 13, 1920	Arena, New Haven, Connecticut, U.S.	
16	Win	9–1–2 (4)	Battling Green	TKO	7 (10)	Mar 29, 1920	City Hall Auditorium, Meriden, Connecticut, U.S.	
15	Win	8–1–2 (4)	George Smith	TKO	3 (?)	Mar 4, 1920	Music Hall, New Haven, Connecticut, U.S.	
14	Draw	7–1–2 (4)	Eddie Ford	NWS	8	Feb 21, 1920	City Hall Auditorium, Meriden, Connecticut, U.S.	
13	Win	7–1–1 (4)	Johnny (KO) Romano	NWS	6	Jan 22, 1920	Bandeck's Hall, New Britain, Connecticut, U.S.	
12	Win	6–1–1 (4)	Battling Harris	NWS	6	Dec 27, 1919	Phoenix Arena, Waterbury, Connecticut, U.S.	
11	Win	5–1–1 (4)	George Hebor	TKO	4 (6)	Dec 18, 1919	Arena, New Haven, Connecticut, U.S.	
10	Win	4–1–1 (4)	Frankie Mack	NWS	6	Dec 1, 1919	Crown Theater, Hartford, Connecticut, U.S.	
9	Win	3–1–1 (4)	Terry O'Connor	NWS	6	Oct 30, 1919	Middletown A.C., Middletown, Connecticut, U.S.	
8	ND	2–1–1 (4)	Kid Black	ND	6	Oct 20, 1919	4th Regiment Armory, Jersey City, New Jersey, U.S.	Precise date of bout unknown at this time
7	ND	2–1–1 (3)	Tommy Shea	ND	6 (?)	Oct 15, 1919	Jersey City, New Jersey, U.S.	Precise date of bout unknown at this time
6	ND	2–1–1 (2)	Happy Gorman	ND	6	Sep 2, 1919	Jersey City, New Jersey, U.S.	Precise date of bout unknown at this time
5	ND	2–1–1 (1)	Young Dempsey	ND	4	Sep 1, 1919	4th Regiment Armory, Jersey City, New Jersey, U.S.	Precise date of bout unknown at this time
4	Draw	2–1–1	Battling Lewis	NWS	6	Nov 18, 1918	Trenton, New Jersey, U.S.	
3	Loss	2–1	George Proto	PTS	6	Apr 29, 1918	Arena, New Haven, Connecticut, U.S.	
2	Win	2–0	Frankie Mack	NWS	4	Mar 21, 1918	Lenox Hall, Meriden, Connecticut, U.S.	
1	Win	1–0	Young Rocco	KO	1 (6)	Mar 7, 1918	Lenox Hall, Meriden, Connecticut, U.S.	

== See also ==
- List of select Jewish boxers

== Professional championships ==
Preceded by Johnny Dundee	World Featherweight Champion; January 2, 1925 – March 1926	Succeeded by Tony Canzoneri
