= Charles Pilkington (cricketer, born 1876) =

English cricketer

Charles Carlisle Pilkington (13 December 1876 – 8 January 1950) was an English cricketer active from 1895 to 1919 who played for Lancashire, Middlesex and Oxford University. He was born in Woolton, Liverpool, educated at Eton and Magdalen College, Oxford, and died in South Warnborough, Hampshire. He appeared in 13 first-class matches as a righthanded batsman who bowled right arm medium pace. He scored 468 runs with a highest score of 86 and held six catches. He took nine wickets with a best analysis of three for 70.
