= Gate receipts =

Sum of money taken for ticket sales

Gate receipts, or simply "gate", is the sum of money taken at a sporting venue for the sale of tickets.

Traditionally, gate receipts were largely or entirely taken in cash. Today, many sporting venues will operate a season ticket scheme, which means they allocate a proportion of season ticket monies when announcing gate receipts for a particular event.

"Gate" is also sometimes used in reference to the number of people in attendance.

== Association football ==
In the English Football League, gate receipts usually go to the home team; however, for cup matches, the gate is split with the other club after deduction of expenses. Prior to 1983, a percentage of league game gate receipts were given to the away club. The league also charged a levy on the gate receipts. Home clubs receive gate compensation money from a pool if a game is postponed due to the away team being involved in an FA Cup or EFL Cup match.

In the Scottish Football League, the entire gate receipts of all league matches and play-off matches (including abandoned or replayed matches) are retained by the home club.

== Boxing ==
The Jack Dempsey vs. Georges Carpentier world heavyweight championship bout on July 2, 1921, at Boyle's Thirty Acres in Jersey City, New Jersey was the first ever boxing fight to produce a "million dollar gate", doubling the previous record, with receipts of $1,789,238 from an official attendance of 80,183, the largest gate and attendance for a sporting event in the United States at the time.

On September 23, 1926, Gene Tunney beat Dempsey to lift the world heavyweight title, at Sesquicentennial Stadium in Philadelphia setting a record gate in terms of attendance (126,084) and receipts ($1,895,733). The rematch (known as The Long Count Fight) was held on September 22, 1927, at Soldier Field in Chicago and would draw gate receipts of $2,658,660. It was the first $2 million gate in entertainment history.

Ticket sales of $4,806,675 for the second Leon Spinks vs. Muhammad Ali fight at the Superdome in New Orleans in September 1978 was the highest live gate for a sporting event at the time, from an attendance of 63,352. In 1980, Larry Holmes vs. Muhammad Ali at Caesars Palace in Paradise, Nevada broke the record with a gate of $6 million.

The second Evander Holyfield vs. Lennox Lewis fight at Thomas & Mack Center in Paradise, Nevada, drew record gate receipts for a boxing match of $16.9 million from 17,078 spectators in 1999. Lewis's fight against Mike Tyson in 2002 at the Pyramid Arena in Memphis, Tennessee was initially claimed to have a record gate of over $23 million; however, this was later reduced to $17.5 million, still a record.

Floyd Mayweather's 2007 fight against Oscar De La Hoya beat the record boxing gate receipts with $18.4 million from 15,432 spectators at MGM Grand Arena in Las Vegas. A Mayweather fight set the record again in his 2013 fight against Canelo Álvarez, also at MGM Grand Arena, with gate receipts of $20 million from 16,146 spectators.

The long awaited Floyd Mayweather Jr. vs. Manny Pacquiao fight on May 2, 2015 at the MGM Grand Garden Arena in Las Vegas generated the highest gate in combat sports history, bringing in a record-breaking $72,198,500 from 16,219 fans.

== See also ==
- List of sports attendance figures
