= The Long Count Fight =

Boxing match

Gene Tunney vs. Jack Dempsey II
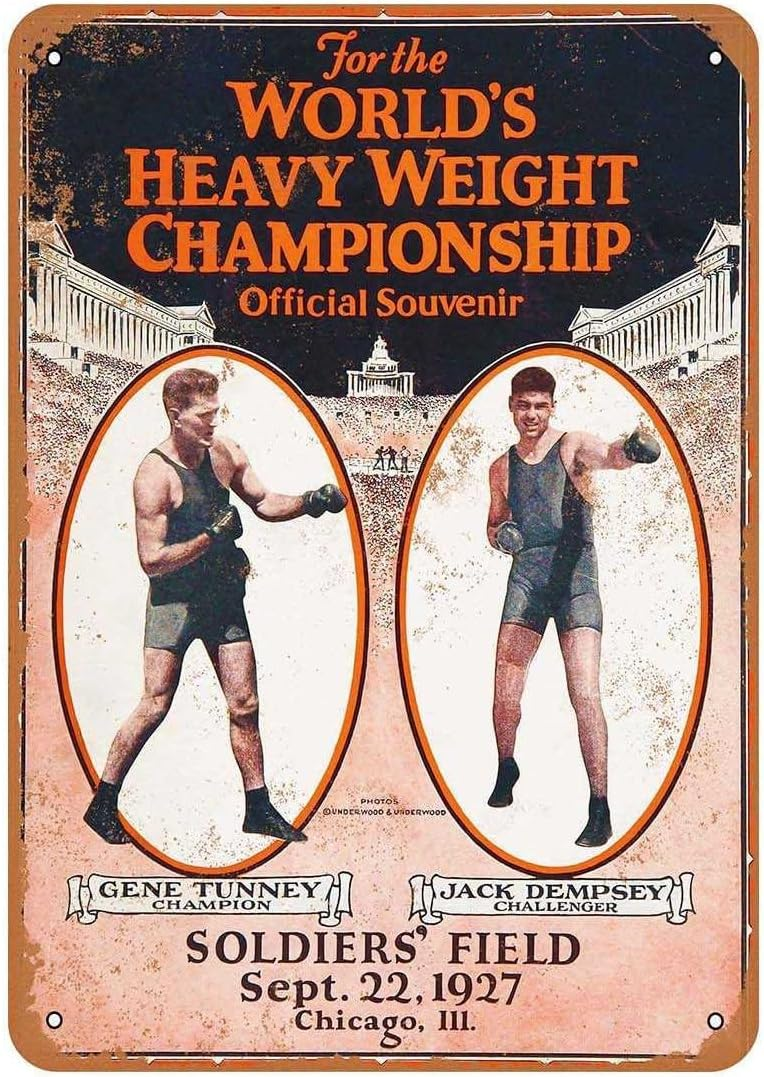
- Date: September 22, 1927
- Venue: Soldier Field, Chicago, Illinois, U.S.
- Title(s) on the line: NBA, NYSAC, and The Ring undisputed heavyweight championship

Tale of the tape
| Boxer | (United States) Gene Tunney | (United States) Jack Dempsey |
| Nickname | "The Fighting Marine" | "The Manassa Mauler" |
| Hometown | New York City, New York | Manassa, Colorado |
| Purse | $990,445 | $447,500 |
| Pre-fight record | 63–1–1 (18) (47 KO) | 63–5–9 (6) (53 KO) |
| Age | 30 years, 3 months | 32 years, 2 months |
| Height | 6 ft 0 in (183 cm) | 6 ft 1 in (185 cm) |
| Weight | 189 1/2 lb (86 kg) | 192 1/2 lb (87 kg) |
| Style | Orthodox | Orthodox |
| Recognition | NBA, NYSAC and The Ring undisputed Heavyweight Champion | The Ring; No. 1 Ranked Heavyweight; Former undisputed heavyweight champion |

Result
- Tunney wins via unanimous decision

Gene Tunney vs. Jack Dempsey II, retroactively known as Long Count Fight, or the Battle of the Long Count, was a professional boxing match contested on September 22, 1927, for the undisputed heavyweight championship.

It was a 10-round rematch between world heavyweight champion Tunney and former champion Dempsey, which Tunney won in a unanimous decision. The fight took place at Soldier Field in Chicago. "Long Count" is applied to the fight because, when Tunney was knocked down in the seventh round, the count was delayed due to Dempsey's failure to go to and remain in a neutral corner. Whether this "long count" actually affected the outcome remains a subject of debate.

== Background ==
Just 364 days before, on September 23, 1926, Tunney had beaten Dempsey in ten rounds by unanimous decision to lift the world heavyweight title, at Sesquicentennial Stadium in Philadelphia. The first fight between Tunney and Dempsey had been moved out of Chicago because Dempsey had learned that Al Capone was a big fan of his, and he did not want Capone to be involved in the fight. Capone reportedly bet $50,000 on Dempsey for the rematch, which fueled false rumors of a fix. Dempsey was favored by odds makers in both fights, largely because of public betting which heavily tilted towards Dempsey.

The rematch was held at Chicago's Soldier Field, and would draw a gate of $2,658,660 (equivalent to $49,277,000 in 2025). It was the first $2 million gate in entertainment history. Tunney received a record purse of $990,445.

The match was broadcast by announcers Graham McNamee and Phillips Carlin to more than 60 NBC radio stations.

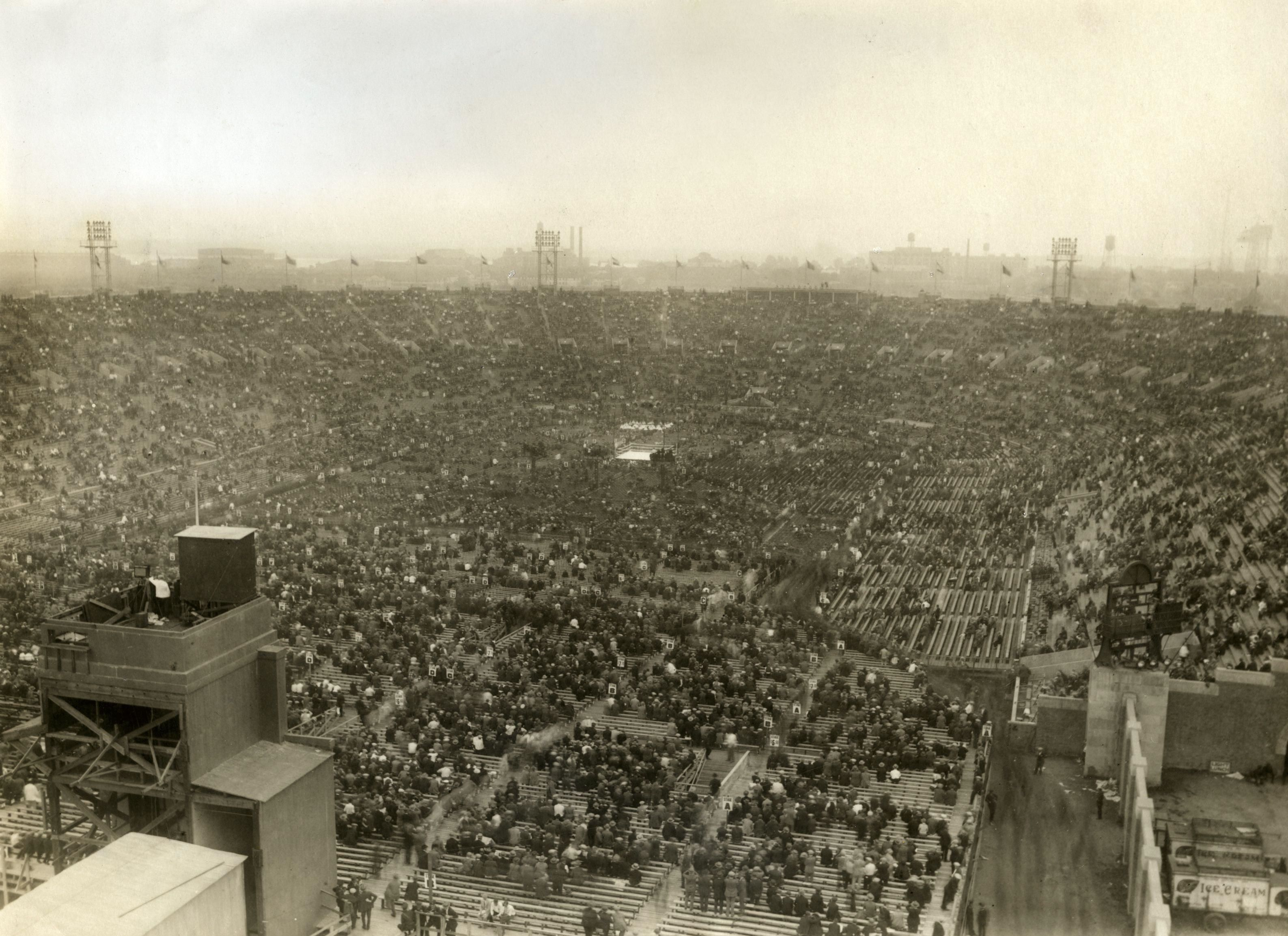
Fans filing into Soldier Field before the fight

Despite the fact that Tunney had won the first fight by a wide margin on the scorecards, the prospect of a second bout created tremendous public interest. Dempsey was one of the so-called "big five" sports legends of the 1920s, and it was widely rumored that he had refused to join the military during World War I. He actually had attempted to enlist in the Army, but had been turned down; a jury later exonerated Dempsey of draft evasion. Tunney, who enjoyed literature and the arts, was a former member of the United States Marine Corps. His nickname was "The Fighting Marine".

The fight took place under new rules regarding knockdowns: the fallen fighter would have 10 seconds to rise to his feet under his own power after his opponent had moved to a neutral corner (i.e., one with no trainers). The Dempsey camp requested the new rule, which was not yet universal, be used. Dempsey, in the final days of training prior to the rematch, apparently ignored the setting of the new rule. Also, the fight was staged inside a 20-foot ring, which favored the boxer with superior footwork, in this case Tunney. Dempsey liked to crowd his opponents, and normally fought in a 16-foot ring that offered less space to maneuver.

Davy Miller was scheduled to be the referee but was replaced at the last minute by Dave Barry when it was rumored that Al Capone had bet on Dempsey and had taken Miller for a car ride.

== The fight ==
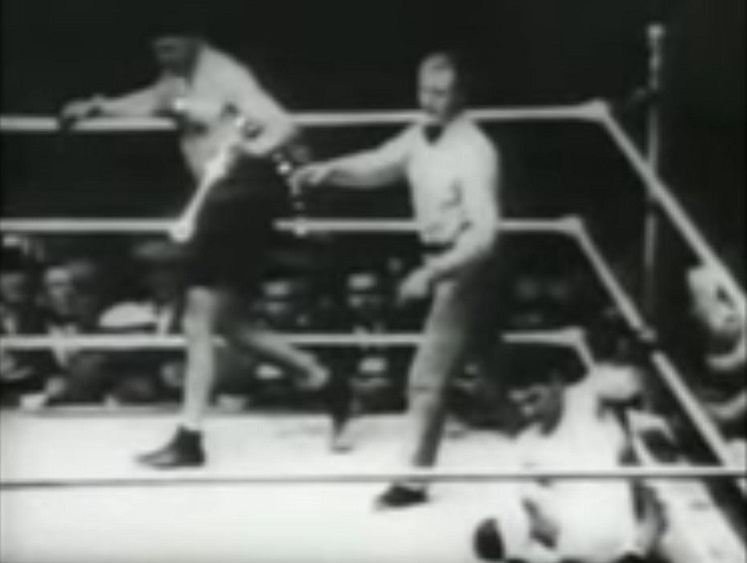
Tunney on the canvas

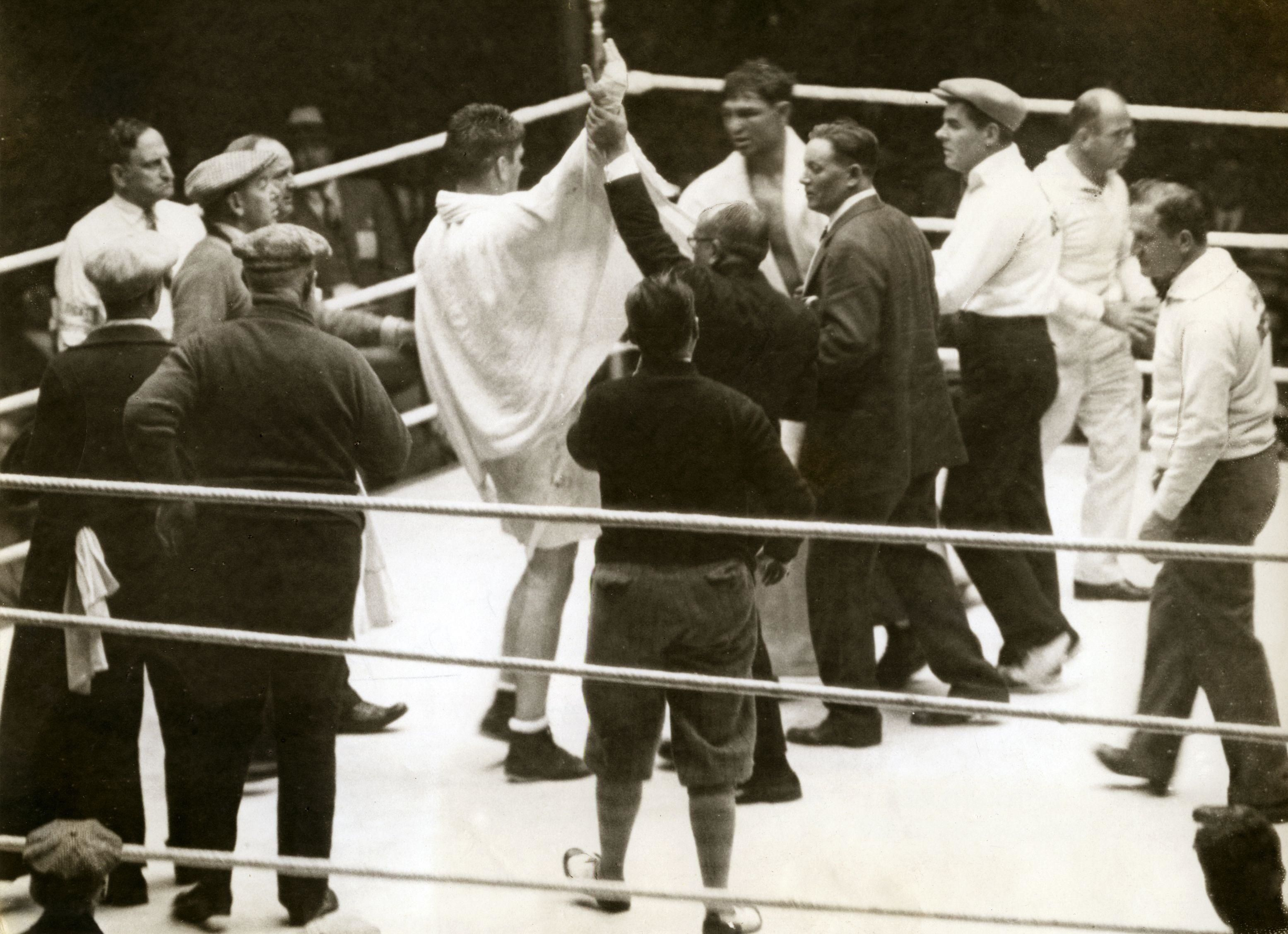
Tunney declared the winner

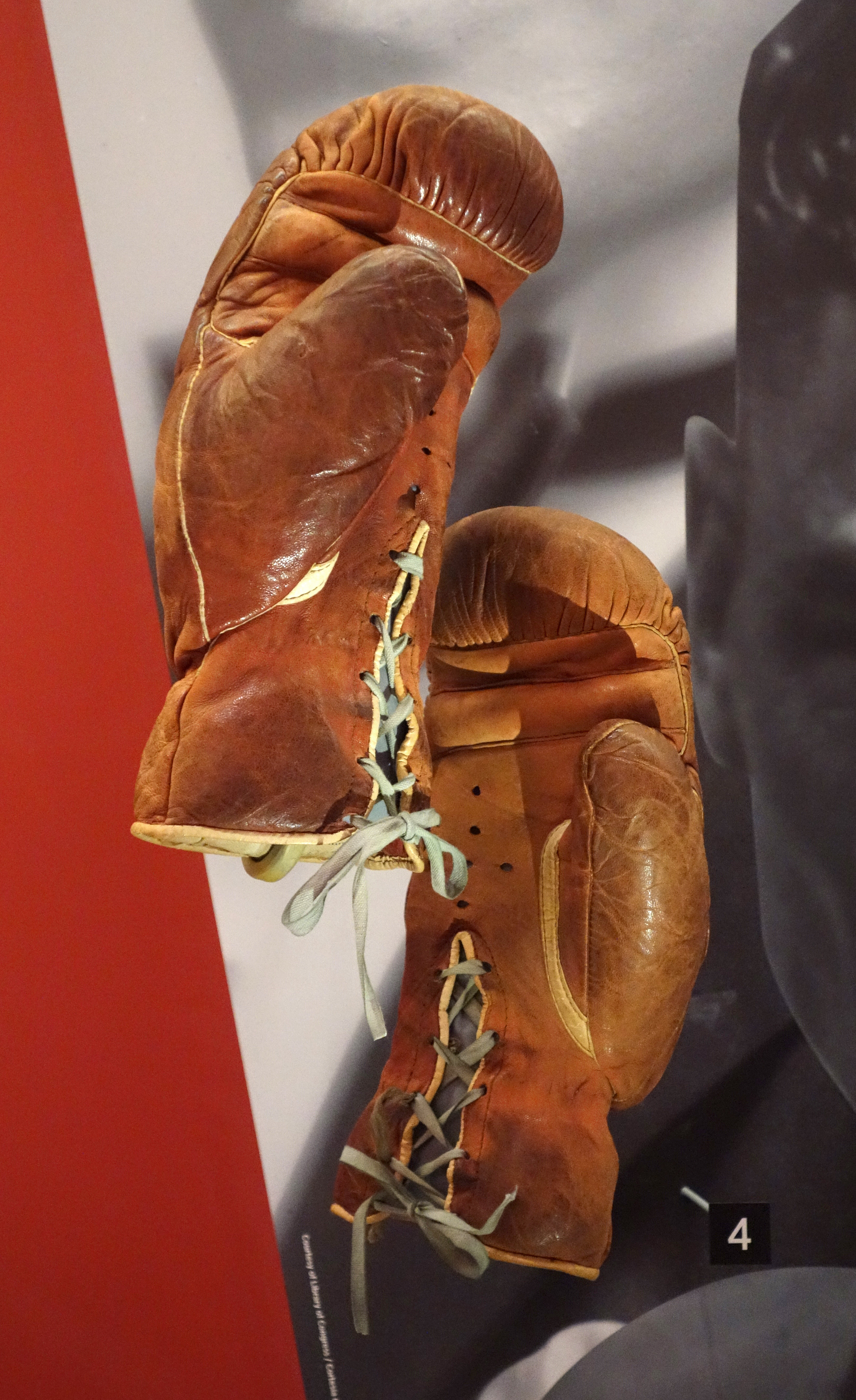
Boxing gloves worn by Gene Tunney in the Long Count Fight (National Museum of American History)

Tunney was, by most accounts, dominating the fight from rounds one to six, using his familiar style of boxing from a distance while looking for openings and, at the same time, building a points lead. Up until the end of round six, nothing indicated this fight would be far different from their original meeting.

In round seven, however, the 104,943 in attendance witnessed a moment that would live on in boxing history. With Tunney trapped against the ropes and near a corner, Dempsey unleashed a combination of punches that floored the champion. Two rights and two lefts landed on Tunney's chin and staggered him, and four more punches put him on the canvas. It was the first time in Tunney's career that he had been knocked down.

Apparently dizzy and disoriented, Tunney grabbed on to the ring's top rope with his left hand. Dempsey, who often stood over downed opponents and rushed back at them after they got up, looked down on Tunney. Referee Dave Barry ordered Dempsey into a neutral corner to no avail; Dempsey remained standing near Tunney, observing his opponent. This gave Tunney precious seconds to recuperate. By the time Dempsey finally walked to a neutral corner, Tunney had been down for around 3 to 8 seconds. Barry could not start to count on Tunney until Dempsey reached the neutral corner, but he was still able to count to nine before Tunney got up. Some believe that if Dempsey had responded to the referee's order in time, he would have likely regained the world heavyweight crown with a seventh-round knockout. The validity of this argument has been debated to this day. In the fight film, a clock was superimposed that recorded Tunney's time on the floor as 13 seconds, from the moment he fell until he got up. Because of this delay, it became known as "The Long Count Fight".

By the eighth round, Tunney had resumed boxing from a distance, and he floored Dempsey with a punch. This time, however, the referee started counting right away, before Tunney had moved to a neutral corner. Tunney then dominated the final two rounds and went on to retain the world title by a unanimous decision. After the fight, Dempsey lifted Tunney's arm and said, "You were best. You fought a smart fight, kid." It was Dempsey's last career fight, and Tunney's next-to-last.

== Aftermath ==
=== Controversy ===
Controversy over the match promptly erupted. A significant factor in prolonging the controversy was that, at the time, U.S. law prohibited the transportation of boxing match movies across state lines (the law had been passed in 1912 in reaction to riots that broke out after Jack Johnson's 1910 victory over James J. Jeffries; the fight had been filmed, though it was banned in some areas of the United States.) As a result, almost nobody was able to see the counts for themselves. Once the law was repealed, and it became possible for many to watch the footage and judge the fallen fighters' alertness (particularly Tunney's), the controversy dwindled.

To this day, however, boxing fans argue over whether Dempsey could or should have won the fight. What is not in dispute is that the public's affection for Dempsey grew in the wake of his two losses to Tunney. "In defeat, he gained more stature," wrote the Washington Post's Shirley Povich. "He was the loser in the battle of the long count, yet the hero."

Tunney said that he had picked up the referee's count at "two," and could have gotten up at any point after that, preferring to wait until "nine" for obvious tactical reasons. Dempsey said, "I have no reason not to believe him. Gene's a great guy."

Dempsey later joined the United States Coast Guard, and he and Tunney became good friends who visited each other frequently. Tunney and Dempsey are both members of the International Boxing Hall of Fame. In March 2011, Tunney's son Jonathan (Jay) Tunney donated the gloves his father wore in the fight to The Smithsonian's National Museum of American History.

== Undercard ==
Confirmed bouts:

| Preceded by First bout | Gene Tunney's bouts 22 September 1927 | Succeeded by vs. Tom Heeney |
| Preceded by vs. Jack Sharkey | Jack Dempsey's bouts 22 September 1927 | Retired |
