= Brian McCleary =

New Zealand rugby union player and boxer

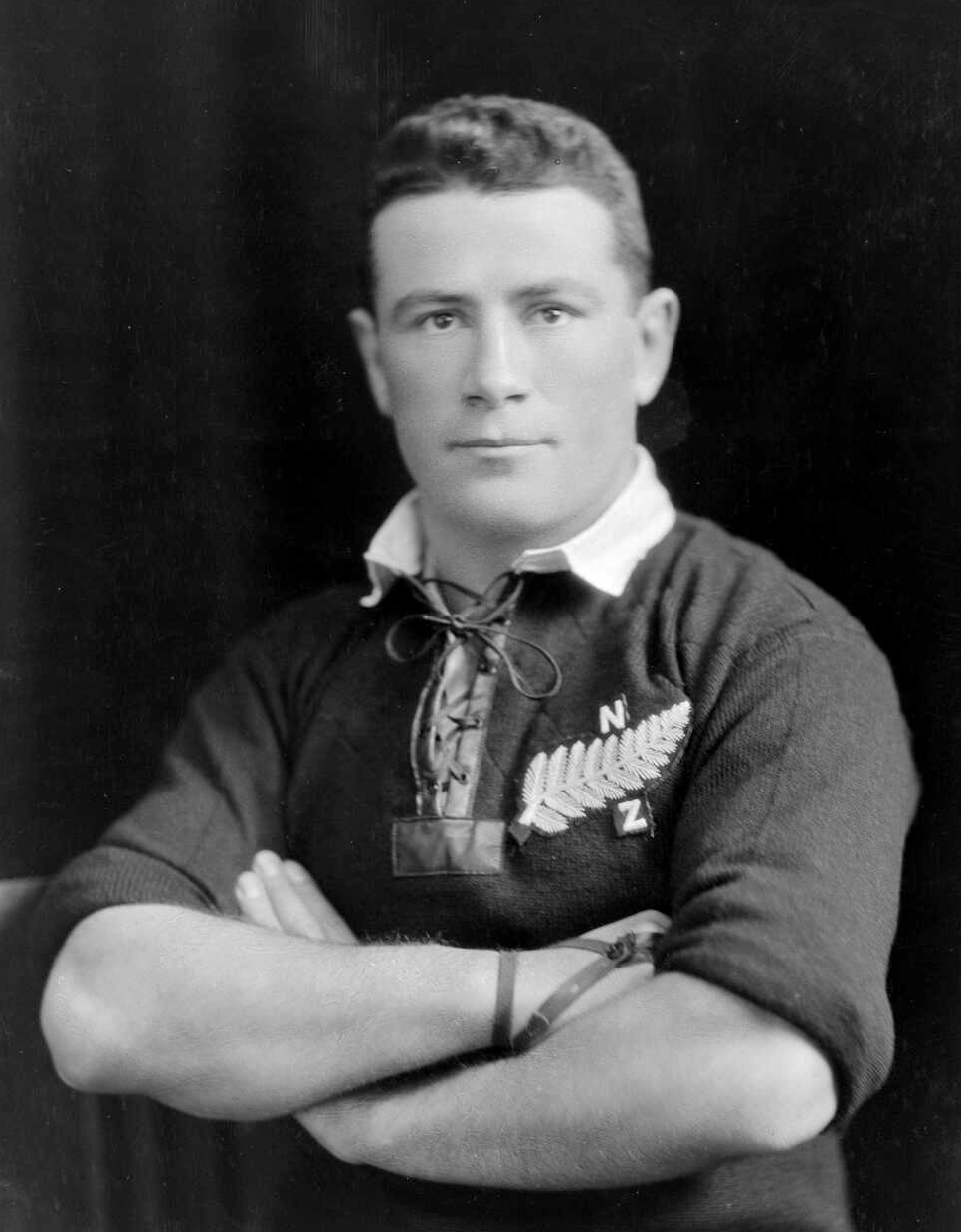
- McCleary in 1924
- Born: Brian Verdon McCleary; 17 January 1897 Dunedin, New Zealand
- Died: 2 July 1978 (aged 81) Martinborough, New Zealand
- Height: 1.75 m (5 ft 9 in)
- Weight: 83 kg (183 lb)
- School: Christian Brothers School

Rugby union career
- Position(s): Hooker; Loose forward
Amateur team(s)
Years	Team	Apps	(Points)
- Christchurch Marist
Provincial / State sides
Years	Team	Apps	(Points)
1920, 1923	Canterbury	7	
International career
Years	Team	Apps	(Points)
1924–25	New Zealand	0	(0)

Brian Verdon McCleary (17 January 1897 – 2 July 1978) was a New Zealand rugby union player and boxer. He was a member of the All Blacks in 1924 and 1925, playing in the hooker position. He was also a New Zealand and Australasian amateur and professional light-heavyweight and heavyweight boxing champion.

== Early life ==
McCleary was born in Dunedin and was educated at Christian Brothers School where he played rugby.

== Rugby union ==
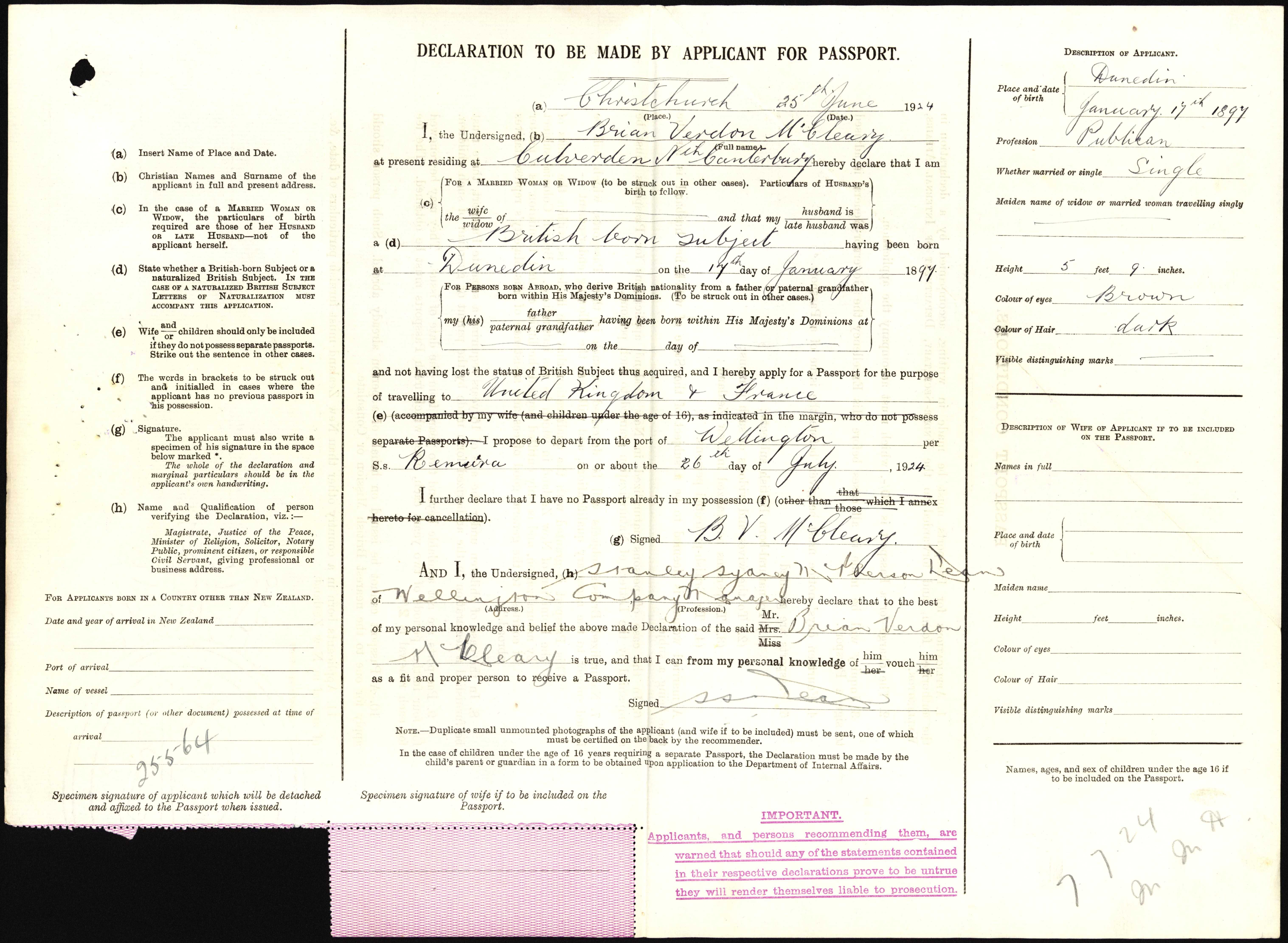
Brian Verdon McCleary passport application (1924)

McCleary played for the Christchurch Marist club and then the Culverden club and represented Canterbury in 1920 and 1923. He represented the South Island in 1923 and 1924 and was a New Zealand trialist in 1924. He was selected for the All Blacks in 1923 and 1925. He played in Australia and at home for New Zealand before the Invincibles tour, on which he played in nine games. In all he played twelve games for the All Blacks. All his matches for New Zealand were against regional or representative clubs never playing at international level.

== Boxing ==
McCleary began his boxing career as an orthodox heavyweight. After an unbeaten amateur record of 32 fights he turned professional.

On 15 April 1922, McCleary challenged Cyril Whittaker for the vacant New Zealand heavyweight title at King Edward's Barracks in Christchurch. The contest went the full fifteen rounds with McCleary winning by points decision, making him the heavyweight champion. He successfully defended his title in May 1922 against Albert Pooley, while a June challenge from Paul McQuarie ended in a no contest. On 9 September 1922, McCleary faced Cyril Whittaker again, when both men dropped a weight to contest the vacant light-heavyweight title. McCleary beat Whittaker again on points, giving him his second New Zealand boxing champion title. He successfully defended his title in May 1923, stopping Laurie Cadman by technical knockout in the seventh round; but lost his title a month later when he lost by points to Eddie Parker.

14 August 1923 saw McCleary face his most notable opponent, Tom Heeney, in a challenge for his heavyweight title. McCleary was beaten by technical knockout in the fourteenth round, losing his title to Heeney who would go on to challenge NBA World heavyweight champion Gene Tunney in New York. McCleary challenged for the New Zealand light-heavyweight belt again in 1924, but lost by decision, again to Eddie Parker.

== Death ==
He died 2 July 1978, aged 81, in Martinborough, and was buried at Martinborough Cemetery.
