= Coliseum Arena =

Former arena in New Orleans, Louisiana

- Coliseum Auditorium, Victory Arena
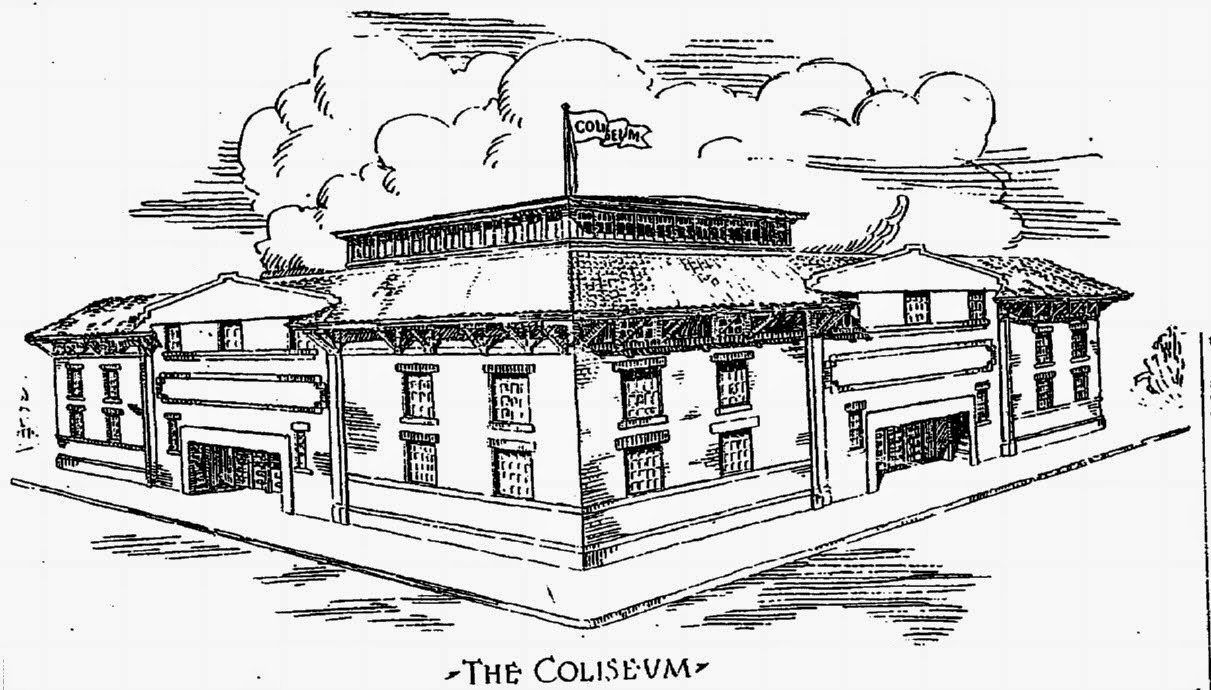
- The Coliseum in 1922
- Interactive map of Coliseum Arena
- Address: 401 N. Roman St.
- Location: New Orleans, Louisiana
- Coordinates: 29.96284°N 90.07738°W
- Owner: Coliseum Incorporated
- Operator: Coliseum Incorporated
- Capacity: 8,000

Construction
- Groundbreaking: 1921
- Built: 1921
- Opened: July 21, 1922
- Closed: 1960
- Cost: >US$100,000
- General contractor: August Frank

The Coliseum Arena or Coliseum Auditorium was an arena at 401 North Roman Street in the Tulane/Gravier neighborhood of New Orleans. It was located at the corner of N. Roman St. and Conti St.

== Venue ==
In early 1921, John Dillon, Frankie Edwards and Al Buja formed a boxing syndicate, Coliseum Incorporated, to develop an arena. On July 21, 1922, the 8,000-seat arena with capacity for 8,500 opened. The arena was modeled after the Milwaukee Auditorium and Madison Square Garden with unobstructed views. The total costs of the four-story steel-trussed white brick-sheathed building exceeded $100,000.

== Events ==
=== Boxing ===
The first event at the arena was a boxing match between local fighter Martin Burke and Charlie Weinert. The arena held many boxing matches including fights featuring Jack Dempsey, Gene Tunney, Joe Brown, Joe Louis, Sugar Ray Robinson, Willie Pastrano and Ralph Dupas. The final boxing match at the arena was held on December 14, 1959.

=== Professional wrestling ===
Professional wrestling matches were held at the arena. Professional wrestler Gorgeous George appeared at the arena almost a dozen times in the early 1950s.

=== Other events ===
The Coliseum also hosted college and high school sports events, music performances and public lectures. Dr. Martin Luther King Jr. spoke at the arena in 1957.

== Arena closing ==
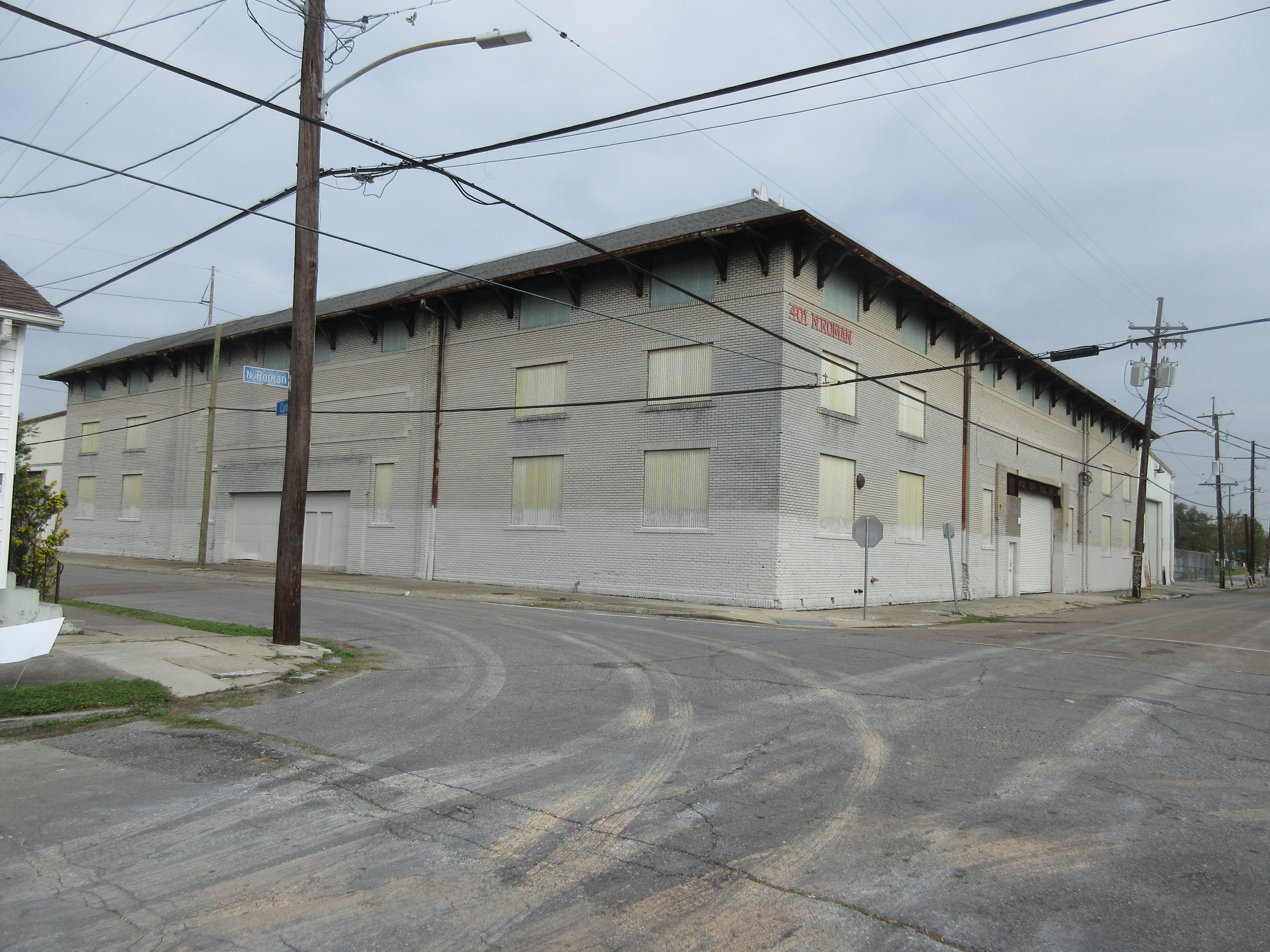
The former Coliseum Arena, long since converted to industrial and warehouse use, in 2024

The Coliseum Arena closed in 1960.
