= Herbert Crossley =

English boxer

Herbert Crossley (5 May 1901 – 15 November 1921) was a heavyweight boxing contender against Gene Tunney on 5 September 1921, shortly after arriving in the United States from England. Crossley died from pneumonia and sepsis on 15 November 1921 at the age of 20.
