= Tom Heeney =

New Zealand boxer

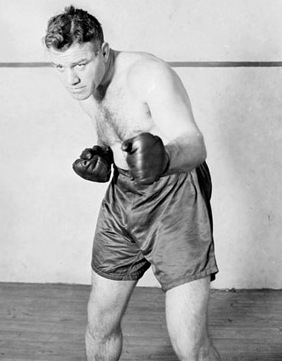

Personal information
- Nickname: The Hard Rock from Down Under
- Nationality: New Zealand
- Born: Thomas Heeney; 18 May 1898 Gisborne, New Zealand
- Died: 15 June 1984 (aged 86) Miami, Florida, U.S.
- Height: 5 ft 10 1/2 in (1.79 m)
- Weight: Heavyweight

Boxing career
- Reach: 72 in (180 cm)

Boxing record
- Total fights: 70
- Wins: 37
- Win by KO: 15
- Losses: 23
- Draws: 8
- No contests: 2

Thomas Heeney (18 May 1898 – 15 June 1984) was a professional heavyweight boxer from New Zealand, best known for unsuccessfully challenging champion Gene Tunney for the heavyweight championship of the world in New York City on 26 July 1928.

== Biography ==
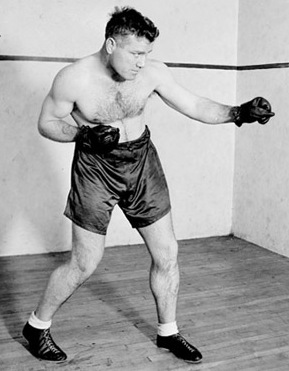
Portrait of Heeney in boxing stance

Heeney was born in Gisborne, New Zealand, and worked as a plumber until he left New Zealand. He was a strong swimmer and was awarded a bronze medal by the Royal Humane Society of New Zealand in 1918 for helping rescue two women from the sea off Waikanae Beach, Gisborne. He also retrieved a third woman who did not survive.

He learnt to box from his father and his older brother Jack Heeney, who was the New Zealand amateur welterweight champion in 1914 and middleweight champion from 1919 to 1924. He became a professional boxer when he fought Bill Bartlett in Gisborne in 1920. In October 1920, Heeney became the New Zealand heavyweight champion when he beat Brian McCleary of Dunedin on a technical knockout. Heeney was also a rugby union player and played for the Hawke's Bay — Poverty Bay team against the Springboks in 1921. He boxed in Australia and won the Australian heavyweight champion title in 1922, and fought in England and South Africa in 1924.

Heeney went to the United States in 1926. He beat Jim Maloney, Johnny Risko and Jim Delaney and eventually ranked fourth among the world's heavyweight boxers. After fighting Jack Sharkey, later a heavyweight world champion, in 1928 for the right to fight Tunney, on 26 July 1928, Heeney fought Gene Tunney at Yankee Stadium, New York City, for the world heavyweight championship title. Heeney entered the boxing ring wearing a Māori cloak that was given to him by Heni Materoa, the widow of Sir James Carroll. The referee, Ed Forbes, stopped the scheduled 15 round fight in the 11th round, and Tunney won. It was said of Heeney:

His gritty performance in this fight would have been considered by many observers to have justified his sobriquet of The Hard Rock from Down Under given by renowned writer and journalist, Damon Runyon.

A week after his defeat, Tom married Marion Dunn, an American. Heeney became an American citizen and boxed until 1934, accomplishing a fighting record of 70 professional bouts, 38 wins, 22 losses, 8 draws, and 2 no-contest.

After retiring from boxing, he owned a bar in Miami, Florida. He served with the United States Navy Civil Engineer Corps in World War II, and afterward coached boxing and refereed armed forces bouts in the South Pacific. He often fished with his friend, the famous writer Ernest Hemingway. Heeney's wife, Marion, died in 1980. They had no children.

Heeney was inducted into the New Zealand Sports Hall of Fame in 1996.

== Professional boxing record ==
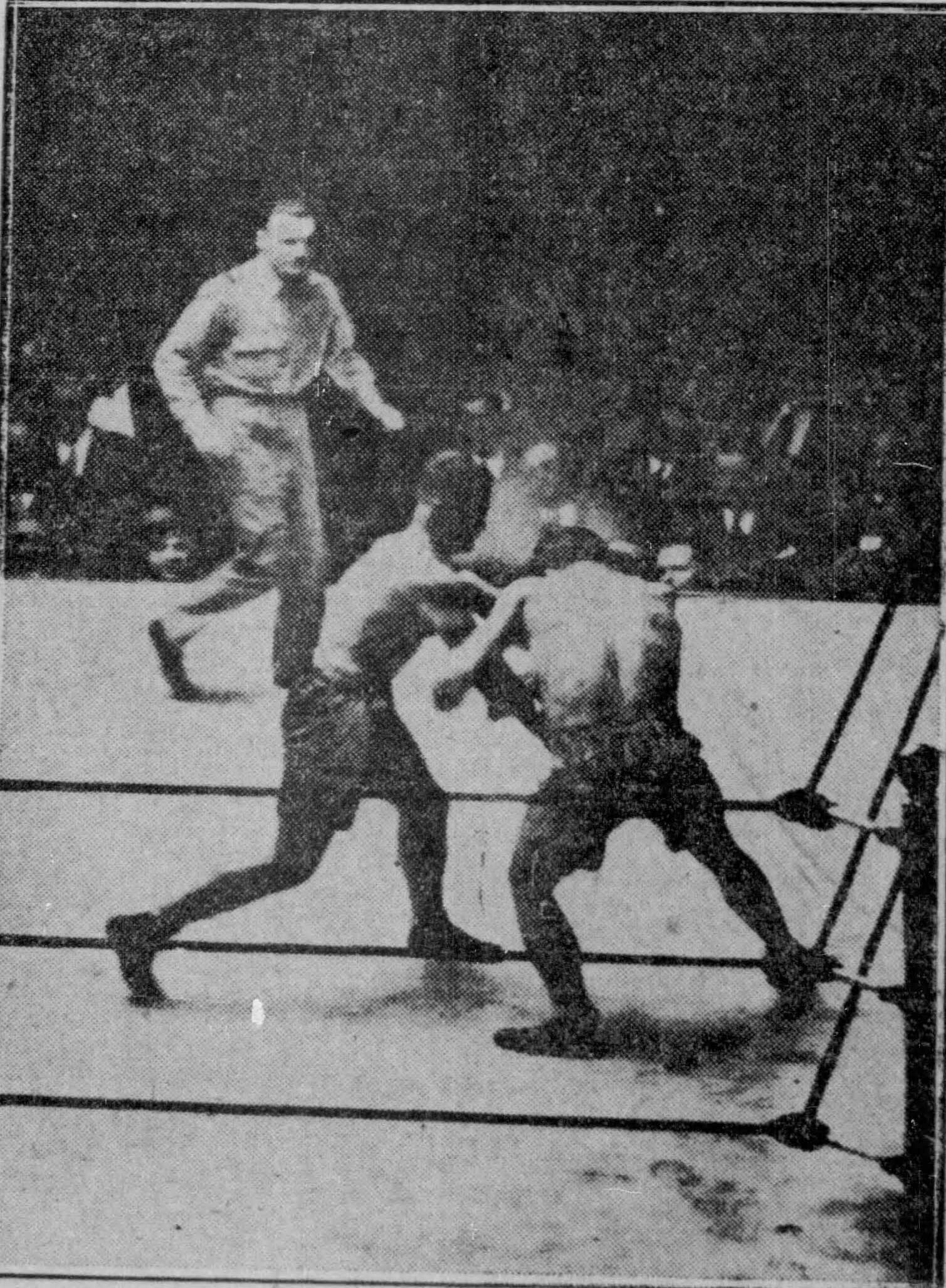
April 1, 1927 match against Paulino Uzcudun

All information in this section is derived from BoxRec, unless otherwise stated.

=== Official record ===
70 fights	37 wins	22 losses
By knockout	15	6
By decision	17	15
By disqualification	5	1
Draws	8	
No contests	2	
Newspaper decisions/draws	1	

All newspaper decisions are officially regarded as “no decision” bouts and are not counted in the win/loss/draw column.

No.	Result	Record	Opponent	Type	Round, time	Date	Location	Notes
70	Loss	37–22–8 (3)	Stanley Poreda	TKO	10 (10), 1:24	Mar 27, 1933	St. Nicholas Arena, New York City, New York, US	
69	Loss	37–21–8 (3)	Charley Retzlaff	NWS	10	Mar 7, 1933	Auditorium, Saint Paul, Minnesota, US	
68	Loss	37–21–8 (2)	Patsy Perroni	PTS	10	Dec 6, 1932	Public Hall, Cleveland, Ohio, US	
67	Draw	37–20–8 (2)	John Schwake	PTS	10	Oct 25, 1932	Coliseum, Saint Louis, Missouri, US	
66	Win	37–20–7 (2)	Hans Birkie	PTS	10	Mar 16, 1932	Auditorium, Oakland, California, US	
65	Loss	36–20–7 (2)	Max Baer	PTS	10	Feb 22, 1932	Seals Stadium, San Francisco, California, US	
64	Draw	36–19–7 (2)	Giacomo Bergomas	PTS	10	Oct 26, 1931	St. Nicholas Arena, New York City, New York, US	
63	Draw	36–19–6 (2)	Jose Santa	PTS	10	Oct 5, 1931	Rhode Island Auditorium, Providence, Rhode Island, US	
62	Win	36–19–5 (2)	Jose Santa	PTS	12	Sep 10, 1931	Mark's Stadium, Tiverton, Rhode Island, US	
61	Loss	35–19–5 (2)	Jimmy Slattery	PTS	6	Apr 20, 1931	Buffalo Auditorium, Buffalo, New York, US	
60	Loss	35–18–5 (2)	Johnny Risko	PTS	10	Apr 6, 1931	Arena Gardens, Toronto, Ontario, Canada	
59	Loss	35–17–5 (2)	Charley Retzlaff	TKO	7 (10)	Mar 6, 1931	Olympia Stadium, Detroit, Michigan, US	
58	Loss	35–16–5 (2)	Max Baer	KO	3 (10)	Jan 16, 1931	Madison Square Garden, New York City, New York, US	
57	Loss	35–15–5 (2)	Emmett Rocco	PTS	10	Oct 13, 1930	Motor Square Garden, Pittsburgh, Pennsylvania, US	
56	Loss	35–14–5 (2)	Frank Cawley	UD	10	Sep 29, 1930	Kingston Armory, Kingston, Pennsylvania, US	
55	Win	35–13–5 (2)	George Panka	SD	10	Sep 8, 1930	Meyers Bowl, North Braddock, New Jersey, US	
54	Loss	34–13–5 (2)	Tuffy Griffiths	TKO	10 (10)	Jul 30, 1930	Queensboro Stadium, New York City, New York, US	
53	Win	34–12–5 (2)	George Hoffman	PTS	10	Sep 26, 1929	Yankee Stadium, New York City, New York, US	
52	Loss	33–12–5 (2)	Victorio Campolo	TKO	9 (10), 2:46	Aug 15, 1929	Ebbets Field, New York City, New York, US	
51	Win	33–11–5 (2)	Elzear Rioux	DQ	8 (10)	May 29, 1929	Forum, Montreal, Quebec, Canada	Rioux DQ'd after Heeney claimed he was hit low 10 times
50	Loss	32–11–5 (2)	Otto von Porat	UD	10	Mar 12, 1929	Coliseum, Chicago, Illinois, US	
49	Loss	32–10–5 (2)	Jim Maloney	PTS	10	Mar 1, 1929	Boston Garden, Boston, Massachusetts, US	
48	Loss	32–9–5 (2)	Gene Tunney	TKO	11 (15), 2:52	Jul 26, 1928	Yankee Stadium, New York City, New York, US	For NYSAC, NBA, and The Ring heavyweight titles
47	Win	32–8–5 (2)	Jack Delaney	UD	15	Mar 1, 1928	Madison Square Garden, New York City, New York, US	
46	Draw	31–8–5 (2)	Jack Sharkey	SD	12	Jan 13, 1928	Madison Square Garden, New York City, New York, US	
45	Win	31–8–4 (2)	Johnny Risko	PTS	10	Oct 26, 1927	Olympia Stadium, Detroit, Michigan, US	
44	Win	30–8–4 (2)	Jim Maloney	KO	1 (12), 1:17	Sep 30, 1927	Madison Square Garden, New York City, New York, US	
43	Draw	29–8–4 (2)	Paulino Uzcudun	PTS	15	Sep 8, 1927	Madison Square Garden, New York City, New York, US	
42	Win	29–8–3 (2)	Bud Gorman	DQ	3 (10), 1:17	Aug 4, 1927	Madison Square Garden, New York City, New York, US	
41	Win	28–8–3 (2)	Jack DeMave	PTS	10	Jun 24, 1927	Coney Island Stadium, New York City, New York, US	
40	Loss	27–8–3 (2)	Paulino Uzcudun	PTS	10	Apr 1, 1927	Madison Square Garden, New York City, New York, US	
39	Win	27–7–3 (2)	Charley Anderson	TKO	8 (10)	Feb 25, 1927	Madison Square Garden, New York City, New York, US	
38	Win	26–7–3 (2)	Jack Stanley	PTS	15	Oct 25, 1926	National Sporting Club, London, England, UK	
37	Win	25–7–3 (2)	Bartley Madden	PTS	20	Aug 9, 1926	Croke Park, Dublin, Ireland	
36	Loss	24–7–3 (2)	Phil Scott	PTS	10	Jul 10, 1926	The Dell, Southampton, Hampshire, England, UK	For Commonwealth heavyweight title
35	Win	24–6–3 (2)	Tom Berry	PTS	15	Jul 5, 1926	The Ring, London, England, UK	
34	Win	23–6–3 (2)	Charley Smith	DQ	5 (10)	Mar 18, 1926	Royal Albert Hall, London, England, UK	
33	Loss	22–6–3 (2)	George 'Blackie' Miller	DQ	5 (20)	Nov 14, 1925	Town Hall, Durban, South Africa	Heeney's seconds entered the ring during the round
32	Win	22–5–3 (2)	George 'Blackie' Miller	DQ	8 (20)	Oct 10, 1925	Town Hall, Johannesburg, South Africa	Low blow
31	Win	21–5–3 (2)	Vic Morace	KO	4 (20)	Jul, 1925	City Hall, Cape Town, South Africa	Exact date unknown
30	Win	20–5–3 (2)	Johnny Squires	RTD	18 (20)	Jun 15, 1925	City Hall, Cape Town, South Africa	
29	Win	19–5–3 (2)	Johnny Squires	PTS	20	Apr 9, 1925	Town Hall, Johannesburg, South Africa	
28	Loss	18–5–3 (2)	George Cook	PTS	20	Feb 12, 1925	Premierland, London, England, UK	
27	Win	18–4–3 (2)	Trooper Jim Young	KO	4 (15)	Jan 19, 1925	National Sporting Club, London, England, UK	
26	NC	17–4–3 (2)	Frans Hendrickx	NC	6 (15)	Nov 3, 1924	The Ring, London, England, UK	Referee stopped the fight for lack of effort by both fighters
25	Loss	17–4–3 (1)	Phil Scott	PTS	20	Sep 22, 1924	The Ring, London, England, UK	For vacant Commonwealth heavyweight title
24	Win	17–3–3 (1)	Ern Young	TKO	4 (15)	Feb 20, 1924	Town Hall, Tokomaru Bay, New Zealand	Retained New Zealand heavyweight title
23	Win	16–3–3 (1)	Jim O'Sullivan	KO	9 (15)	Dec 26, 1923	Opera House, Palmerston North, New Zealand	Retained New Zealand heavyweight title
22	Win	15–3–3 (1)	Jim O'Sullivan	DQ	5 (15)	Nov 10, 1923	Opera House, Gisborne, New Zealand	Won New Zealand heavyweight title
21	Win	14–3–3 (1)	Jim Savage	KO	1 (15)	Oct 26, 1923	Princess Theatre, Napier, New Zealand	
20	Loss	13–3–3 (1)	Jim O'Sullivan	PTS	15	Sep 26, 1923	Town Hall, Auckland, New Zealand	Lost New Zealand heavyweight title
19	Win	13–2–3 (1)	Brian McCleary	TKO	14 (15)	Aug 14, 1923	King Edward's Barracks, Christchurch, New Zealand	Won New Zealand heavyweight title
18	Win	12–2–3 (1)	Jim Flett	TKO	9 (15)	Aug 2, 1923	Opera House, Gisborne, New Zealand	
17	Win	11–2–3 (1)	Cyril Whittaker	TKO	15 (15)	Jun 4, 1923	Town Hall, Auckland, New Zealand	Whittaker died of injuries sustained in this fight.
16	Win	10–2–3 (1)	Jack Complin	TKO	9 (20)	Jan 1, 1923	Sydney Stadium, Sydney, Australia	
15	Draw	9–2–3 (1)	Ern Waddy	PTS	20	Dec 18, 1922	Unley Stadium, Adelaide, Australia	
14	Draw	9–2–2 (1)	Charlie Taylor	PTS	20	Aug 12, 1922	Star Theatre, Mackay, Australia	
13	Win	9–2–1 (1)	Tom Batho	TKO	14 (20)	Jul 22, 1922	Theatre Royal, Townsville, Australia	
12	Loss	8–2–1 (1)	Colin Bell	PTS	20	Jun 30, 1922	Olympic Theatre, Mackay, Australia	For Australian heavyweight title
11	Win	8–1–1 (1)	Jack Leahy	PTS	20	Jun 3, 1922	Olympic Theatre, Mackay, Australia	
10	Win	7–1–1 (1)	Jim Flett	PTS	15	May 1, 1922	Jim Flett, Australia	
9	Loss	6–1–1 (1)	Colin Bell	PTS	20	Mar 17, 1922	Olympic Theatre, Mackay, Australia	For ANBF and Australian heavyweight titles
8	Win	6–0–1 (1)	Max Gornik	RTD	15 (20)	Feb 11, 1922	Brisbane Stadium, Brisbane, Australia	
7	Draw	5–0–1 (1)	Colin Bell	PTS	15	Oct 27, 1921	Opera House, Gisborne, New Zealand	
6	Win	5–0 (1)	Jack Cole	PTS	15	Jul 23, 1921	Kaikohu Hall, Te Karaka, New Zealand	
5	Win	4–0 (1)	Albert Pooley	PTS	15	Feb 11, 1921	Opera House, Gisborne, New Zealand	Retained New Zealand heavyweight title
4	Win	3–0 (1)	Albert Pooley	PTS	15	Oct 27, 1920	Opera House, Gisborne, New Zealand	Won New Zealand heavyweight title
3	ND	2–0 (1)	Frank Gribben	ND	3	Aug 27, 1920	Opera House, Gisborne, New Zealand	
2	Win	2–0	George Modrich	PTS	15	Jun 8, 1920	Opera House, Gisborne, New Zealand	
1	Win	1–0	Bill Bartlett	TKO	9 (15)	Feb 12, 1920	Opera House, Gisborne, New Zealand	

=== Unofficial record ===
70 fights	37 wins	23 losses
By knockout	15	6
By decision	17	16
By disqualification	5	1
Draws	8	
No contests	2	

Record with the inclusion of newspaper decisions in the win/loss/draw column.

No.	Result	Record	Opponent	Type	Round	Date	Location	Notes
70	Loss	37–23–8 (2)	Stanley Poreda	TKO	10 (10), 1:24	Mar 27, 1933	St. Nicholas Arena, New York City, New York, US	
69	Loss	37–22–8 (2)	Charley Retzlaff	NWS	10	Mar 7, 1933	Auditorium, Saint Paul, Minnesota, US	
68	Loss	37–21–8 (2)	Patsy Perroni	PTS	10	Dec 6, 1932	Public Hall, Cleveland, Ohio, US	
67	Draw	37–20–8 (2)	John Schwake	PTS	10	Oct 25, 1932	Coliseum, Saint Louis, Missouri, US	
66	Win	37–20–7 (2)	Hans Birkie	PTS	10	Mar 16, 1932	Auditorium, Oakland, California, US	
65	Loss	36–20–7 (2)	Max Baer	PTS	10	Feb 22, 1932	Seals Stadium, San Francisco, California, US	
64	Draw	36–19–7 (2)	Giacomo Bergomas	PTS	10	Oct 26, 1931	St. Nicholas Arena, New York City, New York, US	
63	Draw	36–19–6 (2)	Jose Santa	PTS	10	Oct 5, 1931	Rhode Island Auditorium, Providence, Rhode Island, US	
62	Win	36–19–5 (2)	Jose Santa	PTS	12	Sep 10, 1931	Mark's Stadium, Tiverton, Rhode Island, US	
61	Loss	35–19–5 (2)	Jimmy Slattery	PTS	6	Apr 20, 1931	Buffalo Auditorium, Buffalo, New York, US	
60	Loss	35–18–5 (2)	Johnny Risko	PTS	10	Apr 6, 1931	Arena Gardens, Toronto, Ontario, Canada	
59	Loss	35–17–5 (2)	Charley Retzlaff	TKO	7 (10)	Mar 6, 1931	Olympia Stadium, Detroit, Michigan, US	
58	Loss	35–16–5 (2)	Max Baer	KO	3 (10)	Jan 16, 1931	Madison Square Garden, New York City, New York, US	
57	Loss	35–15–5 (2)	Emmett Rocco	PTS	10	Oct 13, 1930	Motor Square Garden, Pittsburgh, Pennsylvania, US	
56	Loss	35–14–5 (2)	Frank Cawley	UD	10	Sep 29, 1930	Kingston Armory, Kingston, Pennsylvania, US	
55	Win	35–13–5 (2)	George Panka	SD	10	Sep 8, 1930	Meyers Bowl, North Braddock, New Jersey, US	
54	Loss	34–13–5 (2)	Tuffy Griffiths	TKO	10 (10)	Jul 30, 1930	Queensboro Stadium, New York City, New York, US	
53	Win	34–12–5 (2)	George Hoffman	PTS	10	Sep 26, 1929	Yankee Stadium, New York City, New York, US	
52	Loss	33–12–5 (2)	Victorio Campolo	TKO	9 (10), 2:46	Aug 15, 1929	Ebbets Field, New York City, New York, US	
51	Win	33–11–5 (2)	Elzear Rioux	DQ	8 (10)	May 29, 1929	Forum, Montreal, Quebec, Canada	Rioux DQ'd after Heeney claimed he was hit low 10 times
50	Loss	32–11–5 (2)	Otto von Porat	UD	10	Mar 12, 1929	Coliseum, Chicago, Illinois, US	
49	Loss	32–10–5 (2)	Jim Maloney	PTS	10	Mar 1, 1929	Boston Garden, Boston, Massachusetts, US	
48	Loss	32–9–5 (2)	Gene Tunney	TKO	11 (15), 2:52	Jul 26, 1928	Yankee Stadium, New York City, New York, US	For NYSAC, NBA, and The Ring heavyweight titles
47	Win	32–8–5 (2)	Jack Delaney	UD	15	Mar 1, 1928	Madison Square Garden, New York City, New York, US	
46	Draw	31–8–5 (2)	Jack Sharkey	SD	12	Jan 13, 1928	Madison Square Garden, New York City, New York, US	
45	Win	31–8–4 (2)	Johnny Risko	PTS	10	Oct 26, 1927	Olympia Stadium, Detroit, Michigan, US	
44	Win	30–8–4 (2)	Jim Maloney	KO	1 (12), 1:17	Sep 30, 1927	Madison Square Garden, New York City, New York, US	
43	Draw	29–8–4 (2)	Paulino Uzcudun	PTS	15	Sep 8, 1927	Madison Square Garden, New York City, New York, US	
42	Win	29–8–3 (2)	Bud Gorman	DQ	3 (10), 1:17	Aug 4, 1927	Madison Square Garden, New York City, New York, US	
41	Win	28–8–3 (2)	Jack DeMave	PTS	10	Jun 24, 1927	Coney Island Stadium, New York City, New York, US	
40	Loss	27–8–3 (2)	Paulino Uzcudun	PTS	10	Apr 1, 1927	Madison Square Garden, New York City, New York, US	
39	Win	27–7–3 (2)	Charley Anderson	TKO	8 (10)	Feb 25, 1927	Madison Square Garden, New York City, New York, US	
38	Win	26–7–3 (2)	Jack Stanley	PTS	15	Oct 25, 1926	National Sporting Club, London, England, UK	
37	Win	25–7–3 (2)	Bartley Madden	PTS	20	Aug 9, 1926	Croke Park, Dublin, Ireland	
36	Loss	24–7–3 (2)	Phil Scott	PTS	10	Jul 10, 1926	The Dell, Southampton, Hampshire, England, UK	For Commonwealth heavyweight title
35	Win	24–6–3 (2)	Tom Berry	PTS	15	Jul 5, 1926	The Ring, London, England, UK	
34	Win	23–6–3 (2)	Charley Smith	DQ	5 (10)	Mar 18, 1926	Royal Albert Hall, London, England, UK	
33	Loss	22–6–3 (2)	George 'Blackie' Miller	DQ	5 (20)	Nov 14, 1925	Town Hall, Durban, South Africa	Heeney's seconds entered the ring during the round
32	Win	22–5–3 (2)	George 'Blackie' Miller	DQ	8 (20)	Oct 10, 1925	Town Hall, Johannesburg, South Africa	Low blow
31	Win	21–5–3 (2)	Vic Morace	KO	4 (20)	Jul, 1925	City Hall, Cape Town, South Africa	Exact date unknown
30	Win	20–5–3 (2)	Johnny Squires	RTD	18 (20)	Jun 15, 1925	City Hall, Cape Town, South Africa	
29	Win	19–5–3 (2)	Johnny Squires	PTS	20	Apr 9, 1925	Town Hall, Johannesburg, South Africa	
28	Loss	18–5–3 (2)	George Cook	PTS	20	Feb 12, 1925	Premierland, London, England, UK	
27	Win	18–4–3 (2)	Trooper Jim Young	KO	4 (15)	Jan 19, 1925	National Sporting Club, London, England, UK	
26	NC	17–4–3 (2)	Frans Hendrickx	NC	6 (15)	Nov 3, 1924	The Ring, London, England, UK	Referee stopped the fight for lack of effort by both fighters
25	Loss	17–4–3 (1)	Phil Scott	PTS	20	Sep 22, 1924	The Ring, London, England, UK	For vacant Commonwealth heavyweight title
24	Win	17–3–3 (1)	Ern Young	TKO	4 (15)	Feb 20, 1924	Town Hall, Tokomaru Bay, New Zealand	Retained New Zealand heavyweight title
23	Win	16–3–3 (1)	Jim O'Sullivan	KO	9 (15)	Dec 26, 1923	Opera House, Palmerston North, New Zealand	Retained New Zealand heavyweight title
22	Win	15–3–3 (1)	Jim O'Sullivan	DQ	5 (15)	Nov 10, 1923	Opera House, Gisborne, New Zealand	Won New Zealand heavyweight title
21	Win	14–3–3 (1)	Jim Savage	KO	1 (15)	Oct 26, 1923	Princess Theatre, Napier, New Zealand	
20	Loss	13–3–3 (1)	Jim O'Sullivan	PTS	15	Sep 26, 1923	Town Hall, Auckland, New Zealand	Lost New Zealand heavyweight title
19	Win	13–2–3 (1)	Brian McCleary	TKO	14 (15)	Aug 14, 1923	King Edward's Barracks, Christchurch, New Zealand	Won New Zealand heavyweight title
18	Win	12–2–3 (1)	Jim Flett	TKO	9 (15)	Aug 2, 1923	Opera House, Gisborne, New Zealand	
17	Win	11–2–3 (1)	Cyril Whittaker	TKO	15 (15)	Jun 4, 1923	Town Hall, Auckland, New Zealand	Whittaker died of injuries sustained in this fight.
16	Win	10–2–3 (1)	Jack Complin	TKO	9 (20)	Jan 1, 1923	Sydney Stadium, Sydney, Australia	
15	Draw	9–2–3 (1)	Ern Waddy	PTS	20	Dec 18, 1922	Unley Stadium, Adelaide, Australia	
14	Draw	9–2–2 (1)	Charlie Taylor	PTS	20	Aug 12, 1922	Star Theatre, Mackay, Australia	
13	Win	9–2–1 (1)	Tom Batho	TKO	14 (20)	Jul 22, 1922	Theatre Royal, Townsville, Australia	
12	Loss	8–2–1 (1)	Colin Bell	PTS	20	Jun 30, 1922	Olympic Theatre, Mackay, Australia	For Australian heavyweight title
11	Win	8–1–1 (1)	Jack Leahy	PTS	20	Jun 3, 1922	Olympic Theatre, Mackay, Australia	
10	Win	7–1–1 (1)	Jim Flett	PTS	15	May 1, 1922	Jim Flett, Australia	
9	Loss	6–1–1 (1)	Colin Bell	PTS	20	Mar 17, 1922	Olympic Theatre, Mackay, Australia	For ANBF and Australian heavyweight titles
8	Win	6–0–1 (1)	Max Gornik	RTD	15 (20)	Feb 11, 1922	Brisbane Stadium, Brisbane, Australia	
7	Draw	5–0–1 (1)	Colin Bell	PTS	15	Oct 27, 1921	Opera House, Gisborne, New Zealand	
6	Win	5–0 (1)	Jack Cole	PTS	15	Jul 23, 1921	Kaikohu Hall, Te Karaka, New Zealand	
5	Win	4–0 (1)	Albert Pooley	PTS	15	Feb 11, 1921	Opera House, Gisborne, New Zealand	Retained New Zealand heavyweight title
4	Win	3–0 (1)	Albert Pooley	PTS	15	Oct 27, 1920	Opera House, Gisborne, New Zealand	Won New Zealand heavyweight title
3	ND	2–0 (1)	Frank Gribben	ND	3	Aug 27, 1920	Opera House, Gisborne, New Zealand	
2	Win	2–0	George Modrich	PTS	15	Jun 8, 1920	Opera House, Gisborne, New Zealand	
1	Win	1–0	Bill Bartlett	TKO	9 (15)	Feb 12, 1920	Opera House, Gisborne, New Zealand	
