= Jack Dempsey vs. Gene Tunney =

Boxing match

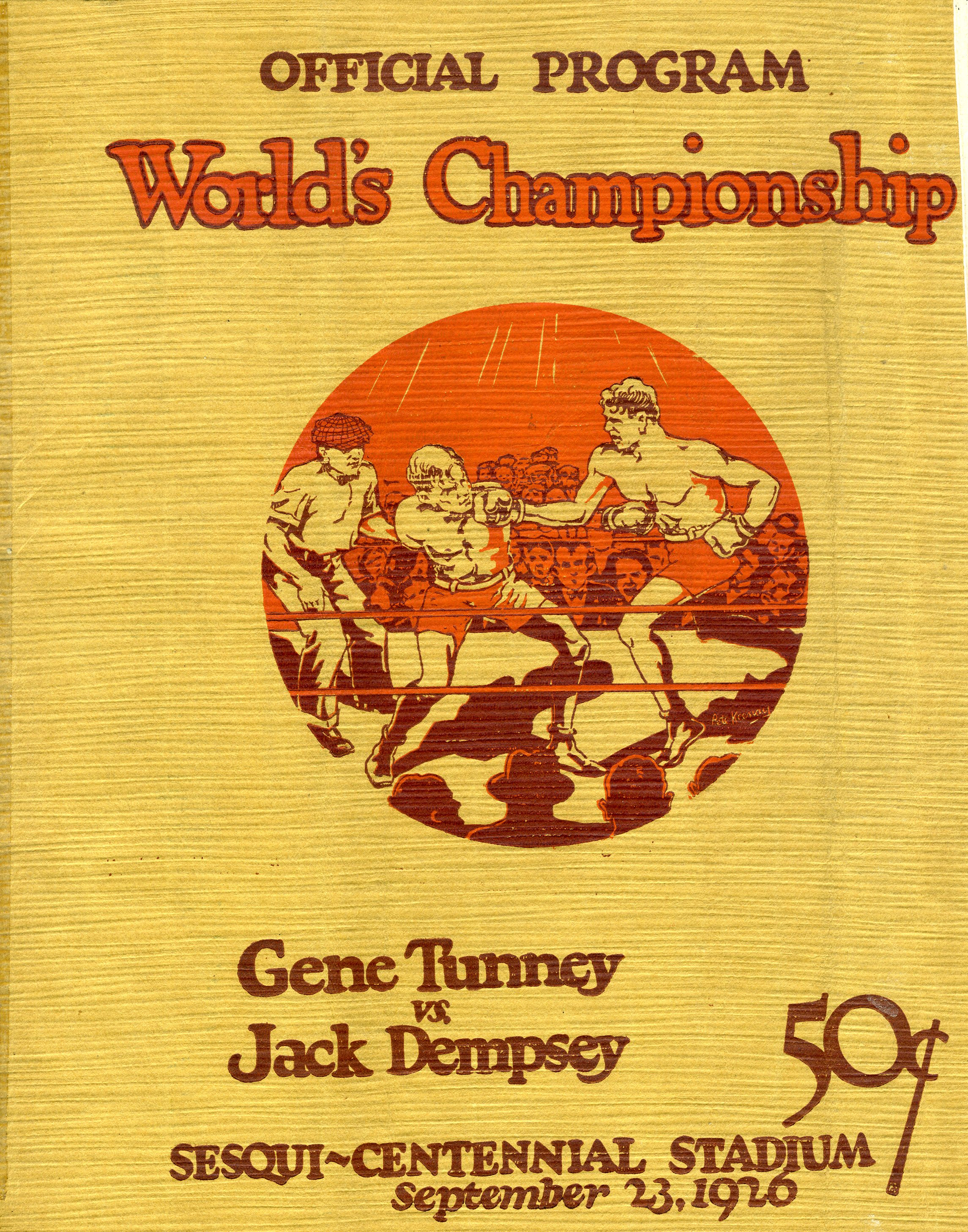
- Program from the bout
- Date: September 23, 1926
- Venue: Sesquicentennial Stadium, Philadelphia, Pennsylvania, U.S.
- Title(s) on the line: NBA, NYSAC, and The Ring undisputed heavyweight championship

Tale of the tape
| Boxer | Jack Dempsey | Gene Tunney |
| Nickname | "The Manassa Mauler" | "The Fighting Marine" |
| Hometown | Manassa, Colorado, U.S. | New York City, New York, U.S. |
| Pre-fight record | 62–4–9 (6) (52 KO) | 62–1–1 (18) (47 KO) |
| Age | 31 years, 2 months | 29 years, 3 months |
| Height | 6 ft 1 in (185 cm) | 6 ft 0 in (183 cm) |
| Weight | 190 lb (86 kg) | 189 1/2 lb (86 kg) |
| Style | Orthodox | Orthodox |
| Recognition | NBA, NYSAC and The Ring undisputed Heavyweight Champion | The Ring; No. 2 Ranked Heavyweight |

Result
- Tunney defeats Dempsey by unanimous decision

Jack Dempsey vs. Gene Tunney was a professional boxing match contested on September 23, 1926, for the undisputed heavyweight championship.

== Background ==
Following his September 1923 victory over Luis Ángel Firpo, world heavyweight champion Jack Dempsey had been linked to a number of bouts including rematches with Firpo and Tommy Gibbons, as well as Harry Wills. Nevertheless, nothing materialized and the champion remained absent from the ring. By August 1925, after almost two years of inactively, the New York Herald sport writer Jack Lawrence was suggesting that NYSAC should strip Dempsey as it appeared both he and his manager Jack Kearns were afraid of Wills and instead have the vacant title contested between Wills and fellow top contender Gene Tunney. On 30 September 1925 Dempsey signed to face Wills the following September in Michigan City, Indiana. However, by January 1926, it was reported that the fight promoter, Floyd Fitzsimmons, can failed to provide the promised collateral and as a result Tex Rickard was attempting to stage a bout between Dempsey and Tunney in July at Boyle's Thirty Acres Jersey City, New Jersey. In March the New York Herald Tribune reported that it had been agreed for an August 12 rounder. After reports that it was set for Chicago on either 11 or 18 September, it was finalized for September 16 at Yankee Stadium New York City. However, on August 16, Dempsey was denied a license to fight in New York by the State Athletic Commission until he defended against Wills. As a result, the bout was moved to Philadelphia and set for the 23 September, almost three years to the day since Dempsey's last title defence.

Most boxing insiders backed Dempsey to win, with the bookmakers recording odds of up 13 to 5 on for the champion to win.

== The fight ==
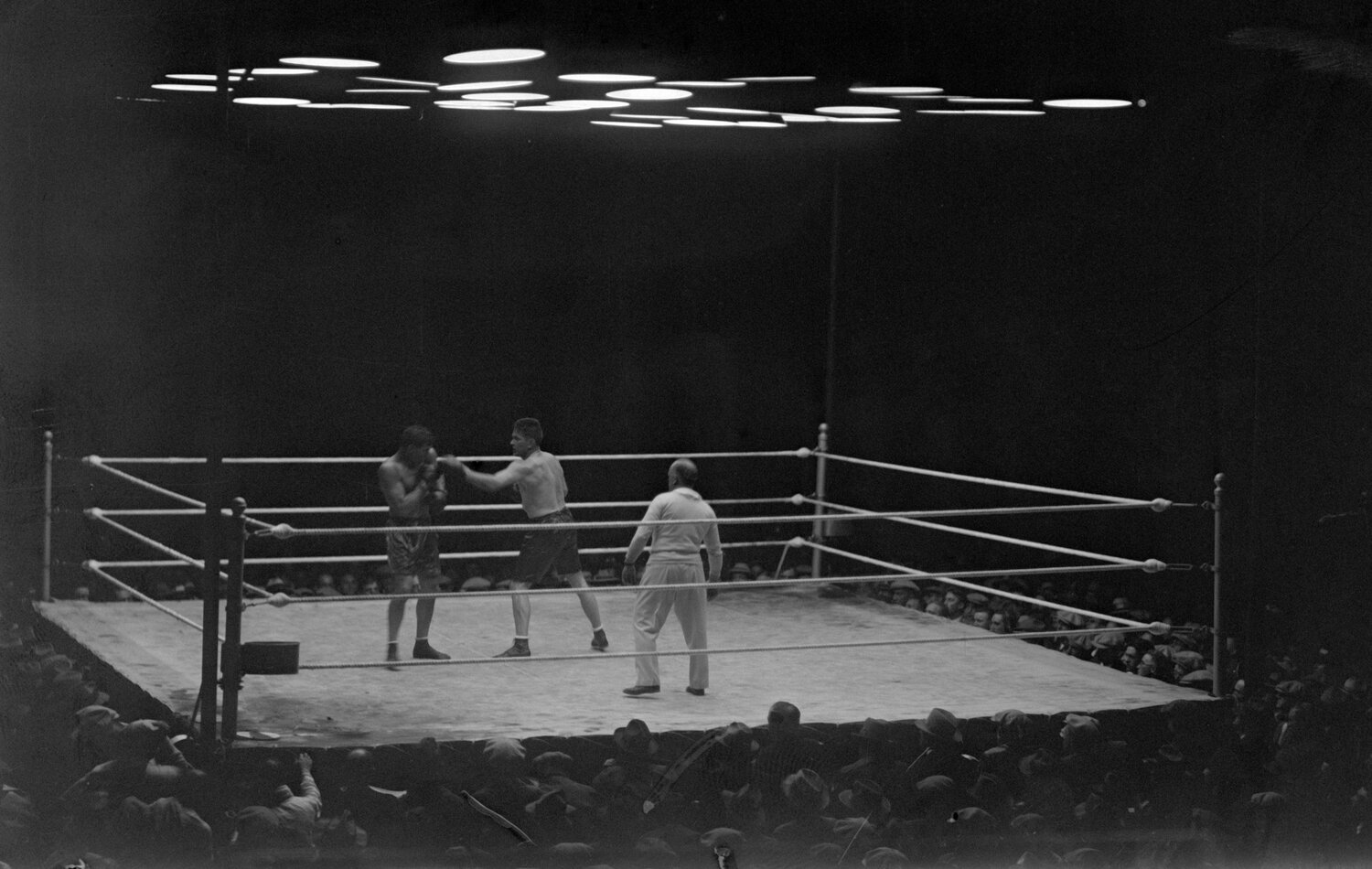
Tunney-Dempsey on September 23, 1926, at Sesquicentennial Stadium in Philadelphia

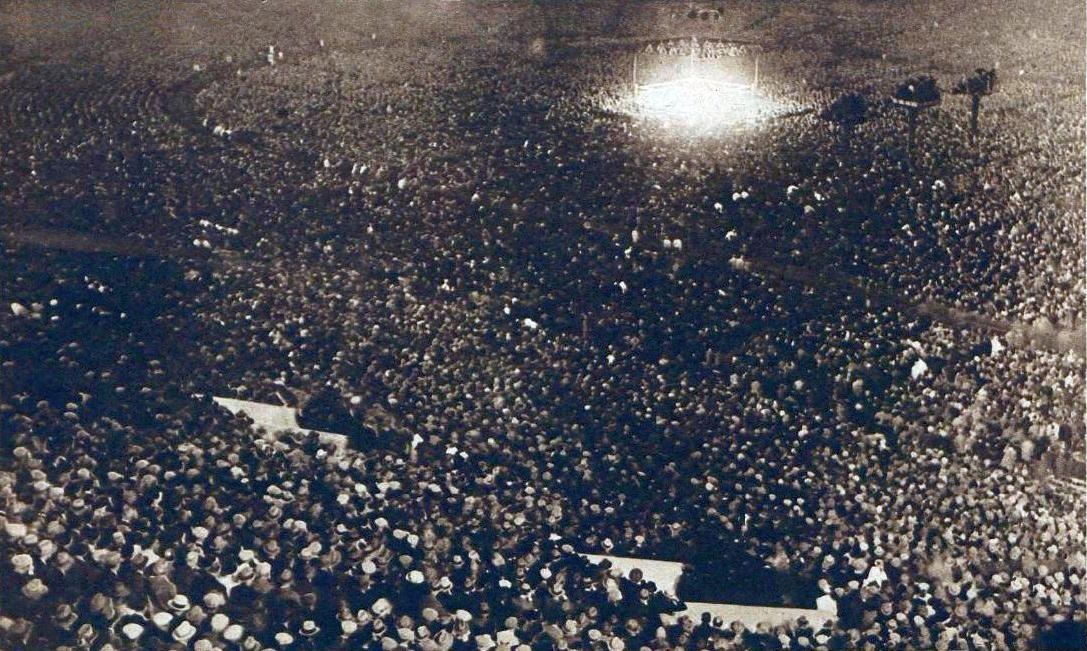
Almost 140,000 fans inside the Sesquicentennial Stadium

As the rain fell, Tunney would stun the world by dominating the champion. The challenger would land numerous short lefts and right hooks at range to the uncharacteristically timid champion so that at the end of the 10 round fight his left eye was completely closed and the left side of his face was badly swollen. Tunney was awarded a unanimous decision victory.

== Aftermath ==
When the defeated Dempsey returned to his dressing room, he explained his loss to his wife by saying, "Honey, I forgot to duck." Fifty-five years later president Ronald Reagan borrowed this quote when his wife Nancy visited him in the emergency room after the attempt on his life.

The crowd of 120,557 was the largest paid attendance ever for a boxing match until February 1993, when 132,274 saw Julio César Chávez vs. Greg Haugen in Mexico City.

== Undercard ==
Confirmed bouts:

| Preceded by vs. Luis Ángel Firpo | Jack Dempsey's bouts 23 September 1926 | Succeeded by vs. Jack Sharkey |
| Preceded by vs. Dan O'Dowd | Gene Tunney's bouts 23 September 1926 | Succeeded by Rematch |
