= Gene Tunney =

American professional boxer (1897–1978)

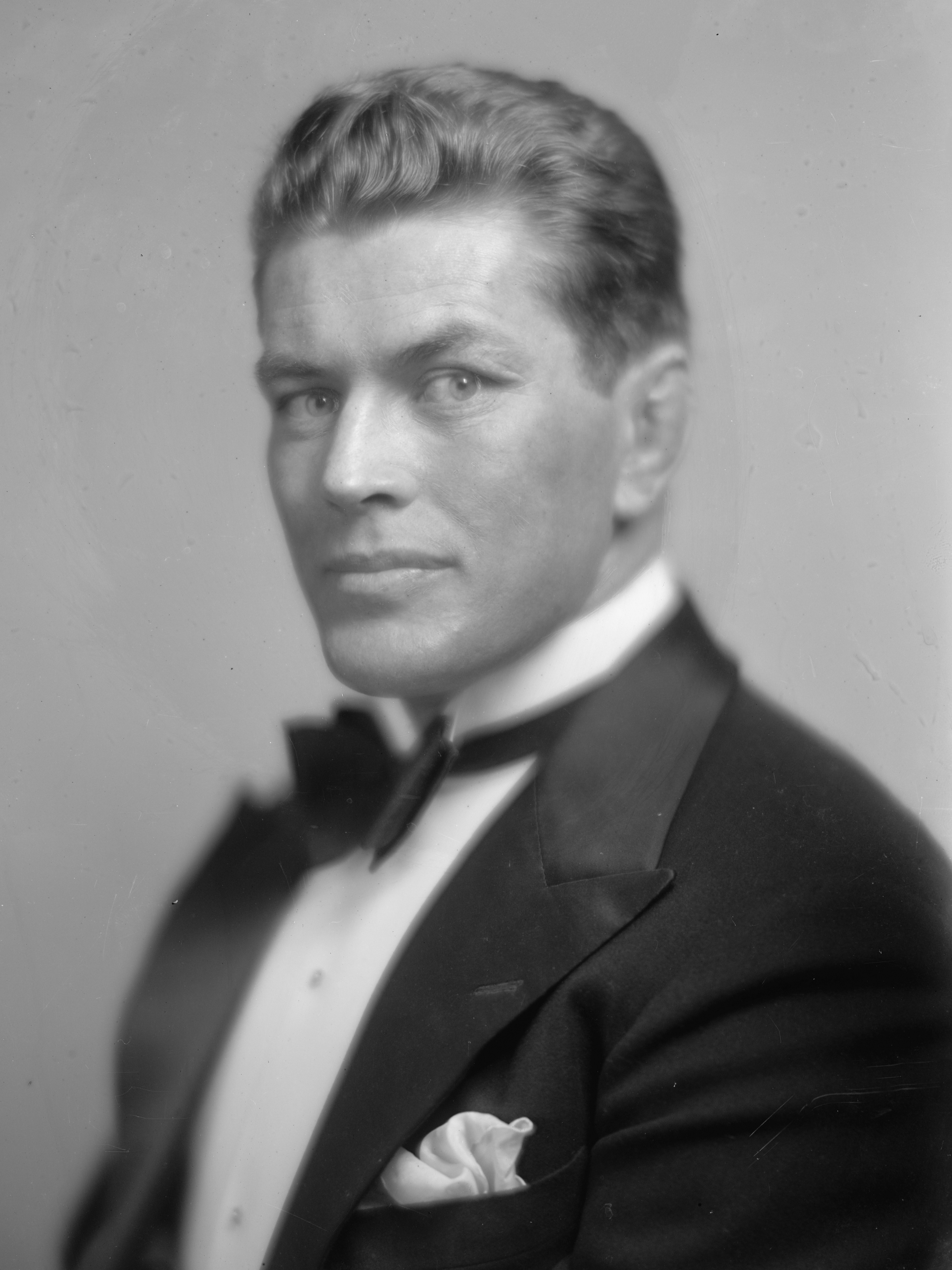
- Tunney c. 1925

Personal information
- Nickname: The Fighting Marine
- Born: James Joseph Tunney; May 25, 1897 New York City, New York, U.S.
- Died: November 7, 1978 (aged 81) Greenwich, Connecticut, U.S.
- Height: 6 ft 0 in (183 cm)
- Weight: Light-heavyweight; Heavyweight

Boxing career
- Reach: 76 in (193 cm)
- Stance: Orthodox

Boxing record
- Total fights: 85
- Wins: 80
- Win by KO: 48
- Losses: 1
- Draws: 3
- No contests: 1

James Joseph "Gene" Tunney (May 25, 1897 – November 7, 1978) was an American professional boxer who competed from 1915 to 1928. He held the world heavyweight title from 1926 to 1928, and the American light heavyweight title twice between 1922 and 1923.

A highly technical boxer, Tunney had a five-fight light heavyweight rivalry with Harry Greb in which he won three, lost once, and drew once, though many ringside reporters believed Greb should have won the decision in their second meeting. Tunney also knocked out Georges Carpentier and defeated Jack Dempsey twice; first in 1926 and again in 1927. Tunney's successful title defense against Dempsey remains one of the most famous bouts in boxing history and is known as The Long Count Fight. He retired undefeated as a heavyweight after his victory over Tom Heeney in 1928, after which Tunney was named the inaugural Fighter of the Year by The Ring magazine.

== Early life ==
James Joseph Tunney was born on May 25, 1897, in New York City to Irish immigrant parents from Kiltimagh, County Mayo. His mother, Mary Lydon from Culleen House, Gorthgarve, Kiltimagh immigrated to the United States after the Great Famine and settled in New York City, where she met John Tunney, from Cill Aodain, Kiltimagh. They married after a short courtship. The Tunneys had seven children. At an early age, Gene Tunney was inspired by President Theodore Roosevelt to become physically fit.

== Career ==
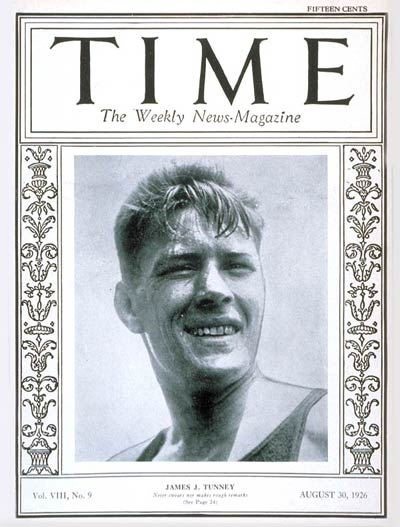
Gene Tunney on the cover of TIME Magazine August 30, 1926

Tunney fought some 68 official professional fights, losing only one, to Harry Greb, while fighting as a light heavyweight. Tunney fought many other fights whose scoring was unofficial, judged by newspaper reporters. He also lost none of these "newspaper decisions". He reported that he lost a second fight during World War I, a 10-round decision, to Tommy Loughran, in a non-professional bout during his military service. Tunney was regarded as an extremely skillful boxer who excelled in defense. In addition to beating Dempsey, the most famous fighter of his era, Tunney defeated Tommy Gibbons, Georges Carpentier, and many other fine boxers.

Already the American Expeditionary Forces champion, Tunney spent the winter of 1921 as a lumberjack in Northern Ontario for the J. R. Booth Company of Ottawa, without revealing he was a champion boxer. He explained this as "wanting the solitude and the strenuous labors of the woods to help condition himself for the career that appeared before him."

Tunney also had a brief acting career, starring in the movie The Fighting Marine in 1926. No prints of the film are known to exist.

He was named The Ring magazine's inaugural Fighter of the Year in 1928 and later elected to the World Boxing Hall of Fame in 1980, the International Boxing Hall of Fame in 1990 and the United States Marine Corps Sports Hall of Fame in 2001.

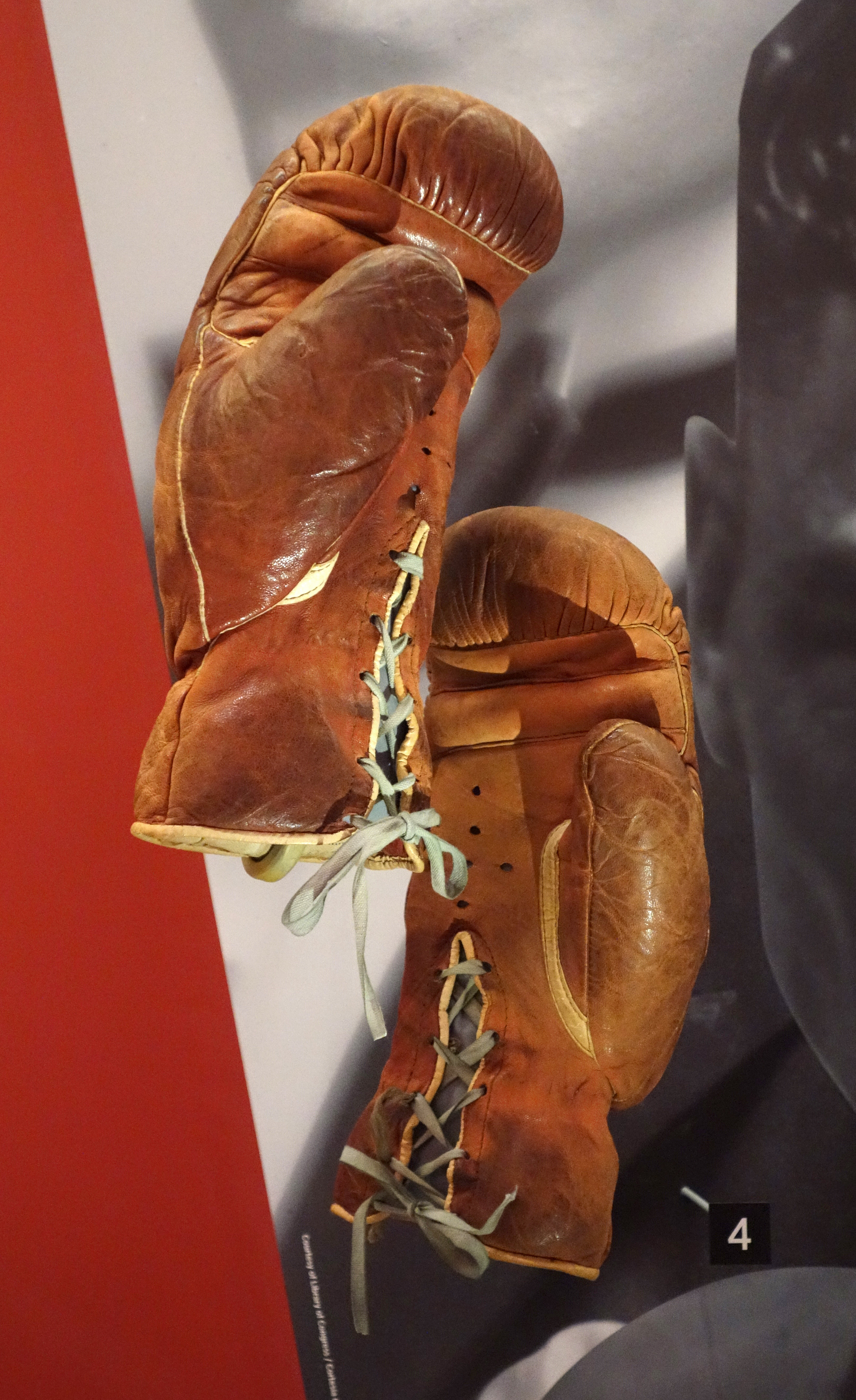
Boxing gloves worn by Tunney in the "Long Count Fight" against Jack Dempsey (National Museum of American History)

=== Fighting style ===
Tunney was a thinking fighter who preferred to make a boxing match into a game of chess, which was not popular during the times when such sluggers as Jack Dempsey, Harry Greb, and Mickey Walker were commanding center stage. Tunney's style was influenced by other noted boxing thinkers such as James J. Corbett and Benny Leonard. Nevertheless, it is incorrect to think of Tunney as a stick-and-move fighter in the Ali style. While Tunney's heavyweight fights against Gibbons, Carpentier, and Dempsey featured his fleet-footed movement and rapid-fire jabbing, his earlier bouts, especially the five against Harry Greb, demonstrated his vicious body punching and willingness to fight toe-to-toe. It was Benny Leonard who advised Tunney that the only way to beat Harry "The Human Windmill" Greb was to aim his punches at Greb's body rather than his head.

Tunney was never knocked out, while only ever being knocked down once, that in his second fight with Dempsey in the infamous Long Count. This makes him one of only five Heavyweight champions, alongside Rocky Marciano, Riddick Bowe, Sultan Ibragimov and Nicolai Valuev to retire without ever suffering a stoppage defeat. Tunney, along with Marciano, Lewis and Vitali Klitschko is one of four heavyweight champions to have retired as champion and to have ended their career with a win in a world title fight. Having avenged his only loss to Harry Greb, Tunney joins Ingemar Johansson, Rocky Marciano, Lennox Lewis and Riddick Bowe as the only five heavyweight champions to have retired while holding a victory over every opponent he faced as a professional (barring no-contests and draws).

Muhammad Ali is quoted praising Tunney's ahead-of-its-time fighting style in the 2015 book "Muhammad Ali: Portrait Of A Champion" by Scoop Malinowski. "If you look at Tunney is where boxing started to get better. He throws punches sharp and quick. Strong, fast and quick. He’s about the best of the old timers. I'd say Tunney is the greatest old timer as far as punching and skill is concerned. Tunney used footwork – something that most heavyweights don't have. I thought I was the only heavyweight to do that. He's jabbing and moving. Tunney didn't fight like old timer fighters, he's moving like me but with no rhythm. Dempsey is dangerous in close like Frazier and Marciano. Dempsey is a good ducker, he could bob a lot. Tunney is the best of that era. I see him sometimes, tell him he was one of the best of all time."

=== Military service ===
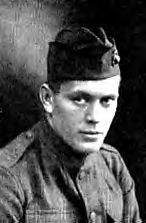
Tunney in Marine uniform

Tunney enlisted the Marine Corps during World War I and served as private with 11th Marine Regiment in France and later in Germany during the occupation of the Rhineland in 1919. He saw no combat and spent most of the war in the Marine boxing team, becoming U.S. Expeditionary Forces champion. Tunney was demobilized following the war, but remained in the Marine Corps Reserve, ultimately reaching the rank of major in the Connecticut Naval Militia.

Following the United States entry into World War II, at the request of Navy Undersecretary James Forrestal, Tunney accepted a commission in the United States Naval Reserve as a lieutenant commander to set up a physical fitness program for student pilots. He headed the Navy's physical fitness programme for the duration of the war and also made an inspection trip to Hawaii and the surrounding area.

Tunney was consecutively promoted to the ranks of commander and captain and retired shortly following the war. For his wartime service, he was decorated with the Navy Commendation Medal and was awarded the American Defense Service Medal, American Campaign Medal, Asiatic Pacific Campaign Medal, World War II Victory Medal. He also held the World War I Victory Medal with France Clasp, Army of Occupation of Germany Medal, and Marine Corps Good Conduct Medal for his World War I enlisted service.

==== Tunney Cup ====
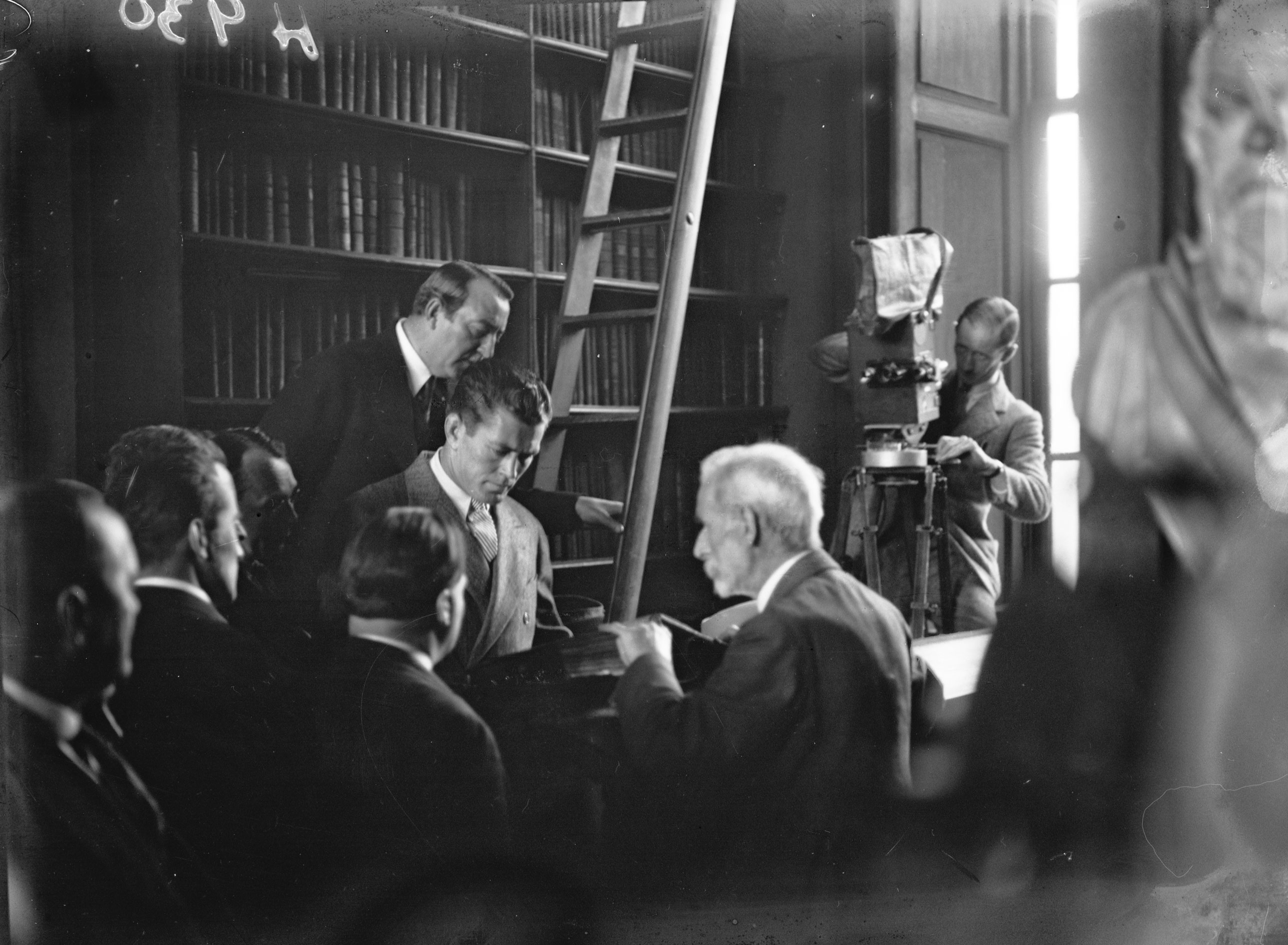
Tunney at Trinity College Dublin, 1928

In 1932, Tunney published a book called A Man Must Fight, in which he gave comments on his career and boxing techniques. In 1928, the U.S. Marine Corps presented – as a sign of friendship – a challenge cup to the Corps of Royal Marines, in the hope it might be competed for by Royal Marines association football teams. The Royal Marines named the trophy the "Tunney Cup," in honor of then-USMC Captain Tunney, who, with Sergeant Major Charles R. Francis, presented the trophy on behalf of the U.S. Marine Corps.

== Personal life ==
In 1928, Tunney married a wealthy socialite Mary "Polly" Lauder (April 24, 1907 – April 19, 2008). After Tunney's retirement, the couple lived in Stamford, Connecticut and raised four children. They had three sons and one daughter:

- John Varick Tunney (1934–2018), who was a U.S. Representative and U.S. Senator from California from 1965 until 1977;
- Jonathan "Jay" Rowland Tunney (1936-) of Stamford, Connecticut;
- Gene Lauder Tunney (1931–2009), who became a lawyer and served as district attorney for Sonoma County, California, for 20 years; and
- Joan Tunney Wilkinson (1939–2008) of San Francisco, who was committed to McLean Hospital on June 6, 1970, after she murdered her husband, Lynn Carter Wilkinson Jr.

Previous to his marrying Polly Lauder, Tunney was sued in 1927 for breach of promise by Katherine King Fogarty.

== Death and legacy ==
=== Death ===
Tunney died on November 7, 1978, at the Greenwich Hospital in Connecticut at the age of 81, after suffering from a circulation ailment. He was interred at Long Ridge Union Cemetery in Stamford, Connecticut.

=== Legacy ===
In 1941, Tunney was honored with the James J. Walker Memorial Award by the Boxing Writers Association of America for outstanding services to his country and boxing.

=== In popular culture ===
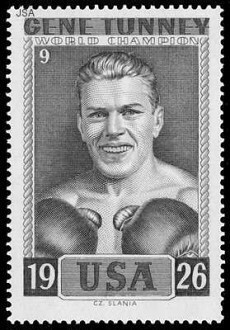
Trading stamp honoring Tunney

Dean Martin and Jerry Lewis had a comedy routine in which Lewis (in boxing shorts and gear) states he will be fighting Gene Tierney (the actress). Martin corrects Lewis and suggests that he must mean "Gene Tunney". Lewis then quips "You fight who you wanna fight, I'm fight'n who I wanna fight, I'm fight'n Gene Tierney."

In the song "She Twists the Knife Again" from Richard Thompson's 1985 album Across a Crowded Room, describing the mismatched intensity in a strife-ladened relationship, Thompson writes: "I'm in a fist fight/She thinks she's Gene Tunney!"

He is also mentioned in Act 1 of Arthur Miller's Death of a Salesman: Willy tells his sons he has a punching bag with Tunney's signature on it.

Mentioned in A Whistle in the Dark (Act 1, p. 31) by Tom Murphy: "in the words of the great Gene Tunney, a man must fight back. His father was a Mayoman too".

Mentioned in the short story "Fallon" by J. D. Luther, when imprisoned character Tyson Wayne Vance recalls his abusive father, "Was more than one night momma'd look like she went fifteen rounds with Gene Tunney...".

In the 1928 silent comedy Feel My Pulse, Richard Arlen's character is asked about why a woman has just come onto an island. He responds (in intertitles), "She uses too big words for me! She talks like she was Gene Tunney's librarian."

In the 1932 boxing film Winner Take All, James Cagney's character Jimmy Kane—a has-been former champion trying to get educated—laments that William Shakespeare was "the one who ruined Gene Tunney."

The novelette A KO for Christmas by Shawn Pollock features a character, Stitch Stanford, who hopes to fight Gene Tunney for the heavyweight title.

== Professional boxing record ==
All information in this section is derived from BoxRec, unless otherwise stated.

=== Official record ===
85 fights	65 wins	1 loss
By knockout	48	0
By decision	17	1
Draws	1	
No contests	1	
Newspaper decisions/draws	17	

All newspaper decisions are officially regarded as “no decision” bouts and are not counted in the win/loss/draw column.

No.	Result	Record	Opponent	Type	Round, time	Date	Location	Notes
85	Win	65–1–1 (18)	Tom Heeney	TKO	11 (15), 2:52	26 Jul 1928	Yankee Stadium New York City, New York, U.S.	Retained NYSAC, NBA, and The Ring heavyweight titles
84	Win	64–1–1 (18)	Jack Dempsey	UD	10	22 Sep 1927	Soldier Field, Chicago, Illinois, U.S.	Retained NYSAC, NBA, and The Ring heavyweight titles
83	Win	63–1–1 (18)	Jack Dempsey	UD	10	23 Sep 1926	Sesquicentennial Stadium, Philadelphia, Pennsylvania, U.S.	Won NYSAC, NBA, and The Ring heavyweight titles
82	Win	62–1–1 (18)	Dan O'Dowd	KO	2 (10), 0:31	29 Dec 1925	Waterfront Park, Saint Petersburg, Florida, U.S.	
81	Win	61–1–1 (18)	Johnny Risko	NWS	12	18 Nov 1925	Public Hall, Cleveland, Ohio, U.S.	
80	Win	61–1–1 (17)	Bartley Madden	KO	3 (10)	25 Sep 1925	Minneapolis Arena, Minneapolis, Minnesota, U.S.	
79	Win	60–1–1 (17)	Italian Jack Herman	KO	2 (10)	3 Jul 1925	Memorial Hall, Kansas City, Kansas, U.S.	
78	Win	59–1–1 (17)	Tommy Gibbons	KO	12 (15)	5 Jun 1925	Polo Grounds New York City, New York, U.S.	
77	Win	58–1–1 (17)	Harry Greb	NWS	10	27 Mar 1925	Auditorium, Saint Paul, Minnesota, U.S.	
76	Win	58–1–1 (16)	Jeff Smith	NWS	15	8 Dec 1924	Coliseum Arena, New Orleans, Louisiana, U.S.	
75	Win	58–1–1 (15)	Buddy McHale	TKO	2 (8)	10 Nov 1924	Southern Athletic Club, Memphis, Tennessee, U.S.	
74	Win	57–1–1 (15)	Harry Foley	TKO	1 (8), 2:05	27 Oct 1924	Auditorium, Memphis, Tennessee, U.S.	
73	Win	56–1–1 (15)	Ray Neuman	PTS	10	27 Sep 1924	Cambria County Fairgrounds, Ebensburg, Pennsylvania, U.S.	
72	Draw	55–1–1 (15)	Harry Greb	NWS	10	17 Sep 1924	Olympic Arena, Brooklyn, Ohio, U.S.	
71	Win	55–1–1 (14)	Joe Lohman	TKO	8 (12)	18 Aug 1924	Fairmont Arena, Columbus, Ohio, U.S.	
70	Win	54–1–1 (14)	Georges Carpentier	TKO	15 (15), 0:14	24 Jul 1924	Polo Grounds New York City, New York, U.S.	
69	Win	53–1–1 (14)	Erminio Spalla	TKO	7 (12)	26 Jun 1924	Yankee Stadium New York City, New York, U.S.	
68	Win	52–1–1 (14)	Jimmy Delaney	NWS	10	17 Mar 1924	Auditorium, Saint Paul, Minnesota, U.S.	
67	Win	52–1–1 (13)	Martin Burke	PTS	15	15 Feb 1924	Coliseum Arena, New Orleans, Louisiana, U.S.	
66	Win	51–1–1 (13)	Ray Thompson	KO	2 (10)	24 Jan 1924	Legion Arena, West Palm Beach, Florida, U.S.	
65	Win	50–1–1 (13)	Harry Foley	NWS	10	15 Jan 1924	Coliseum, Grand Rapids, Michigan, U.S.	
64	Win	50–1–1 (12)	Harry Greb	UD	15	10 Dec 1923	Madison Square Garden New York City, New York, U.S.	Retained ABA light-heavyweight title
63	Win	49–1–1 (12)	Dan O'Dowd	PTS	12	31 Jul 1923	Queensboro Stadium New York City, New York, U.S.	
62	Win	48–1–1 (12)	Jimmy Delaney	NWS	10	16 May 1923	Chicago Coliseum, Chicago, Illinois, U.S.	
61	Win	48–1–1 (11)	Jack Clifford	TKO	8 (10)	7 May 1923	Fair Grounds Coliseum, Detroit, Michigan, U.S.	
60	Win	47–1–1 (11)	Harry Greb	SD	15	23 Feb 1923	Madison Square Garden New York City, New York, U.S.	Won ABA light-heavyweight title
59	Win	46–1–1 (11)	Chuck Wiggins	PTS	12	3 Feb 1923	Commonwealth Sporting Club New York City, New York, U.S.	
58	NC	45–1–1 (11)	Jack Renault	NC	4 (8)	29 Jan 1923	Philadelphia Arena, Philadelphia, Pennsylvania, U.S.	
57	Win	45–1–1 (10)	Charley Weinert	KO	4 (15)	29 Nov 1922	Madison Square Garden New York City, New York, U.S.	
56	Win	44–1–1 (10)	Jack Hanlon	KO	1 (12), 1:22	3 Nov 1922	Clermont Avenue Skating Rink New York City, New York, U.S.	
55	Win	43–1–1 (10)	Chuck Wiggins	PTS	10	27 Oct 1922	Mechanics Hall, Boston, Massachusetts, U.S.	
54	Win	42–1–1 (10)	Tommy Loughran	NWS	8	24 Aug 1922	Shibe Park, Philadelphia, Pennsylvania, U.S.	
53	Win	42–1–1 (9)	Charley Weinert	NWS	12	17 Aug 1922	Broad Athletic Club, Newark, New Jersey, U.S.	
52	Win	42–1–1 (8)	Ray Thompson	KO	3 (10)	4 Aug 1922	Ocean Park Casino, Long Branch, New Jersey, U.S.	
51	Win	41–1–1 (8)	Fay Keiser	PTS	12	7 Jul 1922	Rockaway Beach Arena, Queens, New York City, New York, U.S.	
50	Loss	40–1–1 (8)	Harry Greb	UD	15	23 May 1922	Madison Square Garden New York City, New York, U.S.	Lost ABA light-heavyweight title
49	Win	40–0–1 (8)	Jack Burke	TKO	9 (10)	10 Apr 1922	Motor Square Garden, Pittsburgh, Pennsylvania, U.S.	
48	Win	39–0–1 (8)	Fay Keiser	NWS	10	3 Mar 1922	Armory, Grand Rapids, Michigan, U.S.	
47	Win	39–0–1 (7)	Whitey Wenzel	TKO	4 (8)	14 Feb 1922	Philadelphia_Arena, Philadelphia, Pennsylvania, U.S.	
46	Win	38–0–1 (7)	Jack Clifford	TKO	6 (12), 2:50	11 Feb 1922	Clermont Avenue Skating Rink, Brooklyn, New York City, New York, U.S.	
45	Win	37–0–1 (7)	Battling Levinsky	PTS	12	13 Jan 1922	Madison Square Garden New York City, New York, U.S.	Won vacant ABA light-heavyweight title
44	Win	36–0–1 (7)	Eddie O'Hare	KO	6 (8)	22 Dec 1921	Madison Square Garden New York City, New York, U.S.	
43	Win	35–0–1 (7)	Wolf Larsen	TKO	7 (12), 1:35	25 Oct 1921	Pioneer Sporting Club New York City, New York, U.S.	
42	Win	34–0–1 (7)	Jack Burke	TKO	3 (8)	14 Oct 1921	Madison Square Garden New York City, New York, U.S.	
41	Win	33–0–1 (7)	Herbert Crossley	PTS	7	26 Sep 1921	Dyckman Oval New York City, New York, U.S.	
40	Win	32–0–1 (7)	Eddie Josephs	PTS	12	18 Aug 1921	Sisco Park New York City, New York, U.S.	
39	Win	31–0–1 (7)	Martin Burke	PTS	10	4 Aug 1921	Dyckman Oval New York City, New York, U.S.	
38	Win	30–0–1 (7)	Soldier Jones	TKO	7 (8)	2 Jul 1921	Boyle's Thirty Acres, Jersey City, New Jersey, U.S.	
37	Win	29–0–1 (7)	Johnny Ambrose	KO	1 (12), 2:45	28 Jun 1921	Pioneer Sporting Club New York City, New York, U.S.	
36	Win	28–0–1 (7)	Leo Hauck	NWS	10	7 Dec 1920	4th Regiment Armory, Jersey City, New Jersey, U.S.	
35	Win	28–0–1 (6)	Leo Hauck	NWS	6	25 Nov 1920	Olympia Athletic Club, Philadelphia, Pennsylvania, U.S.	
34	Win	28–0–1 (5)	Paul Samson Koerner	NWS	10	25 Oct 1920	6th Regiment Armory, Paterson, New Jersey, U.S.	
33	Win	28–0–1 (4)	Sergeant Ray Smith	TKO	2 (8)	22 Oct 1920	Sportsman's Club, Camden, New Jersey, U.S.	
32	Win	27–0–1 (4)	Ole Anderson	TKO	3 (10), 0:40	28 Jun 1920	4th Regiment Armory, Jersey City, New Jersey, U.S.	
31	Win	26–0–1 (4)	Jeff Madden	TKO	2 (12)	7 Jun 1920	4th Regiment Armory, Jersey City, New Jersey, U.S.	
30	Win	25–0–1 (4)	Jack Clifford	KO	3 (10)	9 Apr 1920	Community Hall, Johnson City, New York, U.S.	
29	Win	24–0–1 (4)	K.O. Sullivan	KO	1 (8), 2:15	5 Apr 1920	1st Regiment Armory, Newark, New Jersey, U.S.	
28	Win	23–0–1 (4)	Ed Kinley	KO	5 (8)	4 Mar 1920	Grand View Auditorium, Jersey City, New Jersey, U.S.	
27	Win	22–0–1 (4)	Al Roberts	KO	8 (8), 1:06	2 Feb 1920	1st Regiment Armory, Newark, New Jersey, U.S.	
26	Win	21–0–1 (4)	Jim Monahan	KO	1 (8), 2:50	26 Jan 1920	4th Regiment Armory, Jersey City, New Jersey, U.S.	
25	Win	20–0–1 (4)	Bud Nelson	KO	1 (8)	20 Jan 1920	Schuetzen Park, Bayonne, New Jersey, U.S.	
24	Win	19–0–1 (4)	Whitey Allen	KO	2 (8)	1 Jan 1920	Schuetzen Park, Bayonne, New Jersey, U.S.	
23	Win	18–0–1 (4)	Bob Pearce	KO	2 (8)	29 Dec 1919	4th Regiment Armory, Jersey City, New Jersey, U.S.	
22	Win	17–0–1 (4)	Dan O'Dowd	NWS	8	16 Dec 1919	Schuetzen Park, Bayonne, New Jersey, U.S.	
21	Win	17–0–1 (3)	Ted Jamison	PTS	10	26 Apr 1919	Cirque de Paris, Paris, France	Won American Expeditionary Forces light-heavyweight title
20	Win	16–0–1 (3)	K.O. Sullivan	PTS	10	14 Apr 1919	Paris, France	
19	Win	15–0–1 (3)	Dare Lewis	KO	3	28 Mar 1919	Tours, Paris, France	Won S.O.S. light-heavyweight title
18	Win	14–0–1 (3)	Bob Martin	PTS	4	27 Jan 1919	Salle Wagram, Paris, France	
17	Win	13–0–1 (3)	Victor Marchand	KO	2	9 Jan 1919	Paris, France	
16	Draw	12–0–1 (3)	Tommy Gavigan	PTS	10	20 Dec 1918	Romorantin-Lanthenay, Loir-et-Cher, France	
15	Win	12–0 (3)	Howard Morrow	KO	6	10 Dec 1918	Romorantin-Lanthenay, Loir-et-Cher, France	
14	Win	11–0 (3)	Johnny Newton	KO	6	20 Nov 1918	Romorantin-Lanthenay, Loir-et-Cher, France	
13	Win	10–0 (3)	Hank Werhl	KO	6	1 Nov 1918	Romorantin-Lanthenay, Loir-et-Cher, France	
12	Win	9–0 (3)	Young Guerini	KO	1 (8)	8 Jul 1918	4th Regiment Armory, Jersey City, New Jersey, U.S.	
11	Win	8–0 (3)	Hugh Weir	KO	2 (10)	15 Jan 1918	Pioneer Sporting Club New York City, New York, U.S.	
10	Win	7–0 (3)	Joe Borrell	KO	2 (10)	28 Dec 1917	New Polo Athletic Club New York City, New York, U.S.	
9	Win	6–0 (3)	Sailor Wolfe	KO	2 (10)	29 Dec 1916	Miners 8th St Theater New York City, New York, U.S.	
8	Win	5–0 (3)	George Leahy	NWS	6	22 Dec 1916	Miners 8th St Theater New York City, New York, U.S.	
7	Win	5–0 (2)	Young Sharkey	KO	6 (10)	15 Dec 1916	Miners 8th St Theater New York City, New York, U.S.	
6	Win	4–0 (2)	Young Guerini	TKO	8 (10)	8 Dec 1916	Miners 8th St Theater New York City, New York, U.S.	
5	Draw	3–0 (2)	KO Jaffe	NWS	10	21 Jul 1916	New Polo Athletic Club New York City, New York, U.S.	
4	Win	3–0 (1)	Billy Rowe	NWS	6	1 Dec 1915	Fairmont Athletic Club New York City, New York, U.S.	
3	Win	3–0	George Leahy	KO	2 (6)	28 Aug 1915	Fairmont Athletic Club, Bronx, New York City, New York, U.S.	
2	Win	2–0	Battling Genrimo	KO	3 (10)	6 Aug 1915	Miner's Bowery Theatre New York City, New York, U.S.	
1	Win	1–0	Bobby Dawson	TKO	8 (10)	3 Jul 1915	Sharkey Athletic Club New York City, New York, U.S.	

=== Unofficial record ===
85 fights	80 wins	1 loss
By knockout	48	0
By decision	32	1
Draws	3	
No contests	1	

Record with the inclusion of newspaper decisions in the win/loss/draw column.

No.	Result	Record	Opponent	Type	Round, time	Date	Location	Notes
85	Win	80–1–3 (1)	Tom Heeney	TKO	11 (15), 2:52	26 Jul 1928	Yankee Stadium New York City, New York, U.S.	Retained NYSAC, NBA, and The Ring heavyweight titles
84	Win	79–1–3 (1)	Jack Dempsey	UD	10	22 Sep 1927	Soldier Field, Chicago, Illinois, U.S.	Retained NYSAC, NBA, and The Ring heavyweight titles
83	Win	78–1–3 (1)	Jack Dempsey	UD	10	23 Sep 1926	Sesquicentennial Stadium, Philadelphia, Pennsylvania, U.S.	Won NYSAC, NBA, and The Ring heavyweight titles
82	Win	77–1–3 (1)	Dan O'Dowd	KO	2 (10), 0:31	29 Dec 1925	Waterfront Park, Saint Petersburg, Florida, U.S.	
81	Win	76–1–3 (1)	Johnny Risko	NWS	12	18 Nov 1925	Public Hall, Cleveland, Ohio, U.S.	
80	Win	75–1–3 (1)	Bartley Madden	KO	3 (10)	25 Sep 1925	Minneapolis Arena, Minneapolis, Minnesota, U.S.	
79	Win	74–1–3 (1)	Italian Jack Herman	KO	2 (10)	3 Jul 1925	Memorial Hall, Kansas City, Kansas, U.S.	
78	Win	73–1–3 (1)	Tommy Gibbons	KO	12 (15)	5 Jun 1925	Polo Grounds New York City, New York, U.S.	
77	Win	72–1–3 (1)	Harry Greb	NWS	10	27 Mar 1925	Auditorium, Saint Paul, Minnesota, U.S.	
76	Win	71–1–3 (1)	Jeff Smith	NWS	15	8 Dec 1924	Coliseum Arena, New Orleans, Louisiana, U.S.	
75	Win	70–1–3 (1)	Buddy McHale	TKO	2 (8)	10 Nov 1924	Southern Athletic Club, Memphis, Tennessee, U.S.	
74	Win	69–1–3 (1)	Harry Foley	TKO	1 (8), 2:05	27 Oct 1924	Auditorium, Memphis, Tennessee, U.S.	
73	Win	68–1–3 (1)	Ray Neuman	PTS	10	27 Sep 1924	Cambria County Fairgrounds, Ebensburg, Pennsylvania, U.S.	
72	Draw	67–1–3 (1)	Harry Greb	NWS	10	17 Sep 1924	Olympic Arena, Brooklyn, Ohio, U.S.	
71	Win	67–1–2 (1)	Joe Lohman	TKO	8 (12)	18 Aug 1924	Fairmont Arena, Columbus, Ohio, U.S.	
70	Win	66–1–2 (1)	Georges Carpentier	TKO	15 (15), 0:14	24 Jul 1924	Polo Grounds New York City, New York, U.S.	
69	Win	65–1–2 (1)	Erminio Spalla	TKO	7 (12)	26 Jun 1924	Yankee Stadium New York City, New York, U.S.	
68	Win	64–1–2 (1)	Jimmy Delaney	NWS	10	17 Mar 1924	Auditorium, Saint Paul, Minnesota, U.S.	
67	Win	63–1–2 (1)	Martin Burke	PTS	15	15 Feb 1924	Coliseum Arena, New Orleans, Louisiana, U.S.	
66	Win	62–1–2 (1)	Ray Thompson	KO	2 (10)	24 Jan 1924	Legion Arena, West Palm Beach, Florida, U.S.	
65	Win	61–1–2 (1)	Harry Foley	NWS	10	15 Jan 1924	Coliseum, Grand Rapids, Michigan, U.S.	
64	Win	60–1–2 (1)	Harry Greb	UD	15	10 Dec 1923	Madison Square Garden New York City, New York, U.S.	Retained ABA light-heavyweight title
63	Win	59–1–2 (1)	Dan O'Dowd	PTS	12	31 Jul 1923	Queensboro Stadium New York City, New York, U.S.	
62	Win	58–1–2 (1)	Jimmy Delaney	NWS	10	16 May 1923	Chicago Coliseum, Chicago, Illinois, U.S.	
61	Win	57–1–2 (1)	Jack Clifford	TKO	8 (10)	7 May 1923	Fair Grounds Coliseum, Detroit, Michigan, U.S.	
60	Win	56–1–2 (1)	Harry Greb	SD	15	23 Feb 1923	Madison Square Garden New York City, New York, U.S.	Won ABA light-heavyweight title
59	Win	55–1–2 (1)	Chuck Wiggins	PTS	12	3 Feb 1923	Commonwealth Sporting Club New York City, New York, U.S.	
58	NC	54–1–2 (1)	Jack Renault	NC	4 (8)	29 Jan 1923	Philadelphia Arena, Philadelphia, Pennsylvania, U.S.	
57	Win	54–1–2	Charley Weinert	KO	4 (15)	29 Nov 1922	Madison Square Garden New York City, New York, U.S.	
56	Win	53–1–2	Jack Hanlon	KO	1 (12), 1:22	3 Nov 1922	Clermont Avenue Skating Rink New York City, New York, U.S.	
55	Win	52–1–2	Chuck Wiggins	PTS	10	27 Oct 1922	Mechanics Hall, Boston, Massachusetts, U.S.	
54	Win	51–1–2	Tommy Loughran	NWS	8	24 Aug 1922	Shibe Park, Philadelphia, Pennsylvania, U.S.	
53	Win	50–1–2	Charley Weinert	NWS	12	17 Aug 1922	Broad Athletic Club, Newark, New Jersey, U.S.	
52	Win	49–1–2	Ray Thompson	KO	3 (10)	4 Aug 1922	Ocean Park Casino, Long Branch, New Jersey, U.S.	
51	Win	48–1–2	Fay Keiser	PTS	12	7 Jul 1922	Rockaway Beach Arena, Queens, New York City, New York, U.S.	
50	Loss	47–1–2	Harry Greb	UD	15	23 May 1922	Madison Square Garden New York City, New York, U.S.	Lost ABA light-heavyweight title
49	Win	47–0–2	Jack Burke	TKO	9 (10)	10 Apr 1922	Motor Square Garden, Pittsburgh, Pennsylvania, U.S.	
48	Win	46–0–2	Fay Keiser	NWS	10	3 Mar 1922	Armory, Grand Rapids, Michigan, U.S.	
47	Win	45–0–2	Whitey Wenzel	TKO	4 (8)	14 Feb 1922	Philadelphia_Arena, Philadelphia, Pennsylvania, U.S.	
46	Win	44–0–2	Jack Clifford	TKO	6 (12), 2:50	11 Feb 1922	Clermont Avenue Skating Rink, Brooklyn, New York City, New York, U.S.	
45	Win	43–0–2	Battling Levinsky	PTS	12	13 Jan 1922	Madison Square Garden New York City, New York, U.S.	Won vacant ABA light-heavyweight title
44	Win	42–0–2	Eddie O'Hare	KO	6 (8)	22 Dec 1921	Madison Square Garden New York City, New York, U.S.	
43	Win	41–0–2	Wolf Larsen	TKO	7 (12), 1:35	25 Oct 1921	Pioneer Sporting Club New York City, New York, U.S.	
42	Win	40–0–2	Jack Burke	TKO	3 (8)	14 Oct 1921	Madison Square Garden New York City, New York, U.S.	
41	Win	39–0–2	Herbert Crossley	PTS	7	26 Sep 1921	Dyckman Oval New York City, New York, U.S.	
40	Win	38–0–2	Eddie Josephs	PTS	12	18 Aug 1921	Sisco Park New York City, New York, U.S.	
39	Win	37–0–2	Martin Burke	PTS	10	4 Aug 1921	Dyckman Oval New York City, New York, U.S.	
38	Win	36–0–2	Soldier Jones	TKO	7 (8)	2 Jul 1921	Boyle's Thirty Acres, Jersey City, New Jersey, U.S.	
37	Win	35–0–2	Johnny Ambrose	KO	1 (12), 2:45	28 Jun 1921	Pioneer Sporting Club New York City, New York, U.S.	
36	Win	34–0–2	Leo Hauck	NWS	10	7 Dec 1920	4th Regiment Armory, Jersey City, New Jersey, U.S.	
35	Win	33–0–2	Leo Hauck	NWS	6	25 Nov 1920	Olympia Athletic Club, Philadelphia, Pennsylvania, U.S.	
34	Win	32–0–2	Paul Samson Koerner	NWS	10	25 Oct 1920	6th Regiment Armory, Paterson, New Jersey, U.S.	
33	Win	31–0–2	Sergeant Ray Smith	TKO	2 (8)	22 Oct 1920	Sportsman's Club, Camden, New Jersey, U.S.	
32	Win	30–0–2	Ole Anderson	TKO	3 (10), 0:40	28 Jun 1920	4th Regiment Armory, Jersey City, New Jersey, U.S.	
31	Win	29–0–2	Jeff Madden	TKO	2 (12)	7 Jun 1920	4th Regiment Armory, Jersey City, New Jersey, U.S.	
30	Win	28–0–2	Jack Clifford	KO	3 (10)	9 Apr 1920	Community Hall, Johnson City, New York, U.S.	
29	Win	27–0–2	K.O. Sullivan	KO	1 (8), 2:15	5 Apr 1920	1st Regiment Armory, Newark, New Jersey, U.S.	
28	Win	26–0–2	Ed Kinley	KO	5 (8)	4 Mar 1920	Grand View Auditorium, Jersey City, New Jersey, U.S.	
27	Win	25–0–2	Al Roberts	KO	8 (8), 1:06	2 Feb 1920	1st Regiment Armory, Newark, New Jersey, U.S.	
26	Win	24–0–2	Jim Monahan	KO	1 (8), 2:50	26 Jan 1920	4th Regiment Armory, Jersey City, New Jersey, U.S.	
25	Win	23–0–2	Bud Nelson	KO	1 (8)	20 Jan 1920	Schuetzen Park, Bayonne, New Jersey, U.S.	
24	Win	22–0–2	Whitey Allen	KO	2 (8)	1 Jan 1920	Schuetzen Park, Bayonne, New Jersey, U.S.	
23	Win	21–0–2	Bob Pearce	KO	2 (8)	29 Dec 1919	4th Regiment Armory, Jersey City, New Jersey, U.S.	
22	Win	20–0–2	Dan O'Dowd	NWS	8	16 Dec 1919	Schuetzen Park, Bayonne, New Jersey, U.S.	
21	Win	19–0–2	Ted Jamison	PTS	10	26 Apr 1919	Cirque de Paris, Paris, France	Won American Expeditionary Forces light-heavyweight title
20	Win	18–0–2	K.O. Sullivan	PTS	10	14 Apr 1919	Paris, France	
19	Win	17–0–2	Dare Lewis	KO	3	28 Mar 1919	Tours, Paris, France	Won S.O.S. light-heavyweight title
18	Win	16–0–2	Bob Martin	PTS	4	27 Jan 1919	Salle Wagram, Paris, France	
17	Win	15–0–2	Victor Marchand	KO	2	9 Jan 1919	Paris, France	
16	Draw	14–0–2	Tommy Gavigan	PTS	10	20 Dec 1918	Romorantin-Lanthenay, Loir-et-Cher, France	
15	Win	14–0–1	Howard Morrow	KO	6	10 Dec 1918	Romorantin-Lanthenay, Loir-et-Cher, France	
14	Win	13–0–1	Johnny Newton	KO	6	20 Nov 1918	Romorantin-Lanthenay, Loir-et-Cher, France	
13	Win	12–0–1	Hank Werhl	KO	6	1 Nov 1918	Romorantin-Lanthenay, Loir-et-Cher, France	
12	Win	11–0–1	Young Guerini	KO	1 (8)	8 Jul 1918	4th Regiment Armory, Jersey City, New Jersey, U.S.	
11	Win	10–0–1	Hugh Weir	KO	2 (10)	15 Jan 1918	Pioneer Sporting Club New York City, New York, U.S.	
10	Win	9–0–1	Joe Borrell	KO	2 (10)	28 Dec 1917	New Polo Athletic Club New York City, New York, U.S.	
9	Win	8–0–1	Sailor Wolfe	KO	2 (10)	29 Dec 1916	Miners 8th St Theater New York City, New York, U.S.	
8	Win	7–0–1	George Leahy	NWS	6	22 Dec 1916	Miners 8th St Theater New York City, New York, U.S.	
7	Win	6–0–1	Young Sharkey	KO	6 (10)	15 Dec 1916	Miners 8th St Theater New York City, New York, U.S.	
6	Win	5–0–1	Young Guerini	TKO	8 (10)	8 Dec 1916	Miners 8th St Theater New York City, New York, U.S.	
5	Draw	4–0–1	KO Jaffe	NWS	10	21 Jul 1916	New Polo Athletic Club New York City, New York, U.S.	
4	Win	4–0	Billy Rowe	NWS	6	1 Dec 1915	Fairmont Athletic Club New York City, New York, U.S.	
3	Win	3–0	George Leahy	KO	2 (6)	28 Aug 1915	Fairmont Athletic Club, Bronx, New York City, New York, U.S.	
2	Win	2–0	Battling Genrimo	KO	3 (10)	6 Aug 1915	Miner's Bowery Theatre New York City, New York, U.S.	
1	Win	1–0	Bobby Dawson	TKO	8 (10)	3 Jul 1915	Sharkey Athletic Club New York City, New York, U.S.	

== Titles in boxing ==
=== Major world titles ===
- NYSAC heavyweight champion (200+ lbs)
- NBA (WBA) heavyweight champion (200+ lbs)

=== The Ring magazine titles ===
- The Ring heavyweight champion (200+ lbs)

=== Regional/International titles ===
- S.O.S. light heavyweight champion (175 lbs)
- American Expeditionary Forces light heavyweight champion (175 lbs)
- American (ABA) light heavyweight champion (175 lbs) (2×)

=== Undisputed titles ===
- Undisputed heavyweight champion

== See also ==
- List of heavyweight boxing champions
- List of The Ring world champions
- List of undisputed boxing champions
- International Boxing Hall of Fame
- Boxing in the 1920s
- List of people on the cover of Time magazine (30 August 1926)

Sporting positions
World boxing titles
Preceded by Jack Dempsey	The Ring heavyweight champion September 23, 1926 – July 31, 1928	Vacant Title next held by Max Schmeling
Preceded by Jack Dempsey	World heavyweight champion	Vacant Title next held by Max Schmeling
