= Santa Camarão =

Portuguese boxer

José Santa
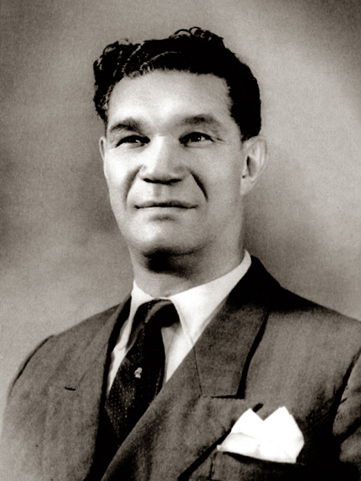

Personal information
- Nickname: Camarão
- Nationality: (Portugal) Portuguese
- Born: José Soares Santa; 25 December 1902 Ovar, Portugal
- Died: 5 April 1968 (aged 65) Ovar, Portugal
- Height: 2.02 m (6 ft 7.5 in)
- Weight: Heavyweight

Boxing career
- Stance: Orthodox

Boxing record
- Total fights: 95
- Wins: 69
- Win by KO: 48
- Losses: 20
- Draws: 4
- No contests: 2

José Soares Santa (25 December 1902 – 5 April 1968), known as Santa Camarão ("Camarão" being a family nickname meaning Shrimp in English) or Zé Santa in Portugal, and as Jose Santa or Joe Santa in the United States, was a Portuguese boxer. At 2.02 m (6 ft 8 in) he was one of the tallest heavyweight boxers in history.

== Life and career ==
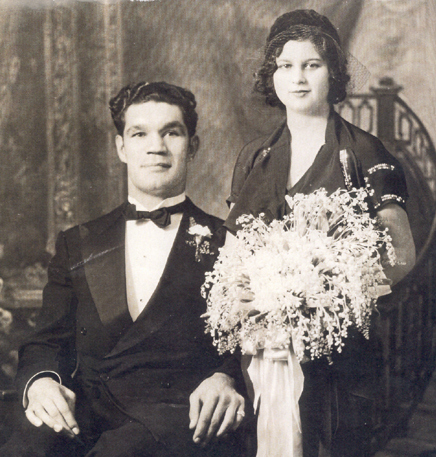
Santa with wife in 1932

Son of António Soares Santa and Josefa Pereira dos Santos, Santa was a remarkable individual growing up to 2.02 m (6 ft 8 in) at a time when the average height for a man in Portugal was 1.64 m (5 ft 5 in). He was born in Ovar, and in 1911 moved to Lisbon, where his father was earning for his family. There he had a brief career in wrestling, before changing to professional boxing in 1922.

Santa's professional boxing career lasted until 1934, which he mostly spent in Portugal (1922–26, with a few fights later in 1929), Brazil (1926–28 and 1933–34), and the United States (1930–33) where he was widely popular with the Portuguese immigrants livings in southern Massachusetts and Rhode Island. He contested the European title in 1929 against Pierre Charles, but lost by points; he also lost to heavyweight champions Max Baer and Primo Carnera. He also signed for a three-round exhibition fight with former heavyweight champion Jack Johnson late in Johnson's career but the commission nixed it, fearing for Johnson's life.

Santa played himself in two boxing movies, Love in the Ring (1930) and The Prizefighter and the Lady (1933), alongside the boxing celebrities Max Schmeling, Max Baer and Jack Dempsey. Love in the Ring was the first international movie where Portuguese was spoken on screen, by Santa Camarão. He received US$8,000 for The Prizefighter and the Lady, which was his largest ever single payment.

In 1932, while fighting in the United States, Santa married the Portuguese American woman Mary Loreta de Oliveira. After retiring from the ring, in 1935 he took her back to his hometown. The same year Mary Loreta gave birth to his son, Renaldo José Santa. She separated from her husband in 1949, taking Renaldo with her.

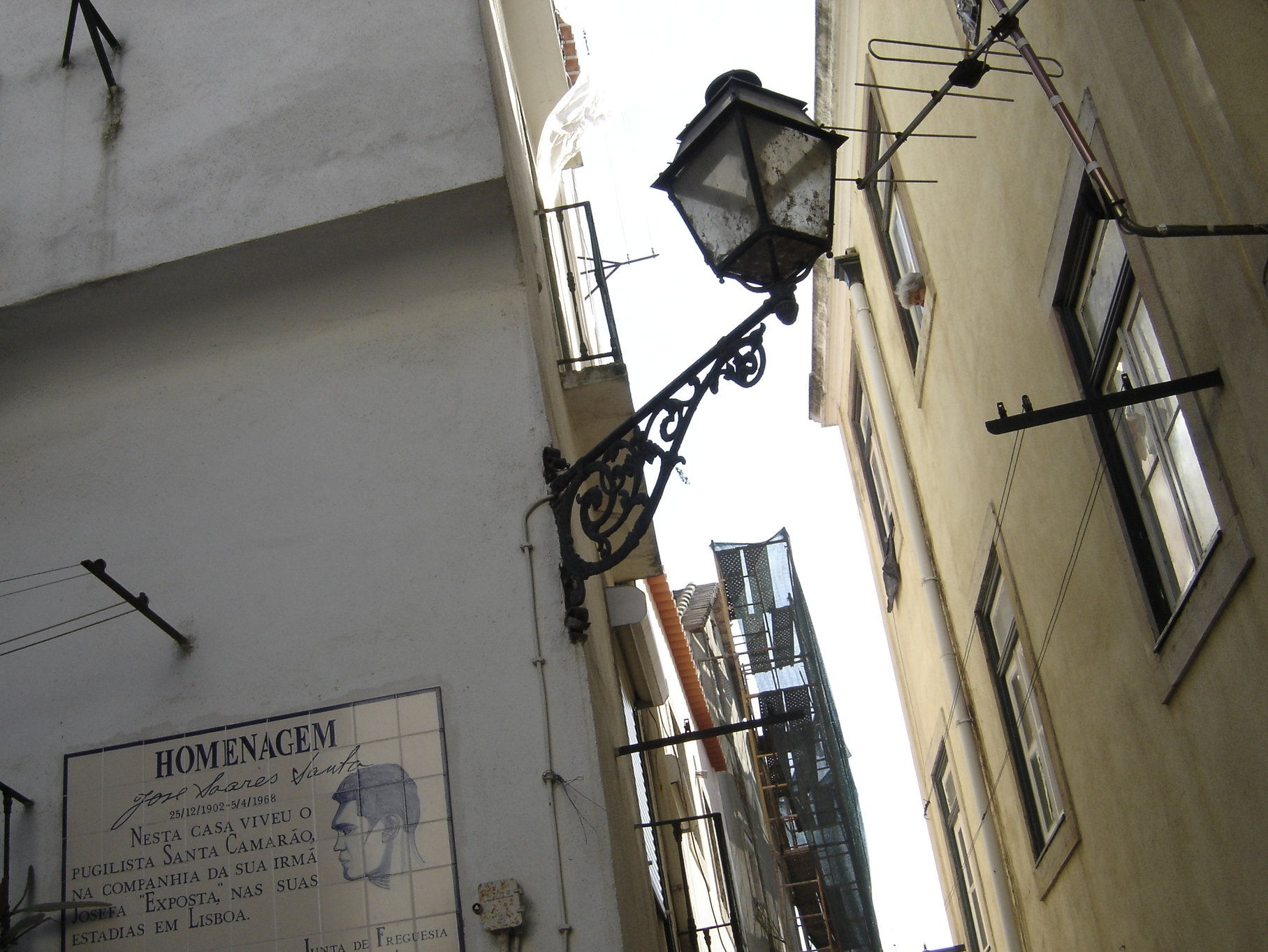
Rua José Santa Camarão in Lisbon

Santa Camarão died in 1968 in Ovar, in the same house where he was born. Later a street in Lisbon was named Rua José Santa Camarão in his honor. In 2003, he was posthumously awarded the Medal for Good Sports Services (Medalha de Bons Serviços Desportivos) by the Government of Portugal.

Until Nikolay Valuev (2.14 m (7 ft 0 in)) became a professional boxer in 1993, Santa was the tallest heavyweight in boxing history. He enjoyed a sizable reach advantage over most rivals, and when seen on fight footage, he seems like a towering giant compared to many heavyweights of his era, who were usually shorter than him.

== Professional boxing record ==
69 Wins (48 knockouts), 20 Losses (7 knockouts), 4 Draws, 2 No Contests
Result	Record	Opponent	Type	Round	Date	Location	Notes
Loss	69-20-4 (2)	(Spain) Claudio Villar	TKO	9 (10)	11 November 1934	Praca de Touros do Campo Pequeno, Lisbon, Portugal	
Loss	69-19-4 (2)	(Argentina) Victorio Campolo	TKO	3 (10)	7 July 1934	Estadio Brasil, Rio de Janeiro, Brazil	
Win	69-18-4 (2)	(Argentina) Norman Tomasulo	KO	4 (10)	16 June 1934	Estadio Brasil, Rio de Janeiro, Brazil	
Win	68-18-4 (2)	(Argentina) Arturo Costarelli	TKO	5 (10)	5 May 1934	Estadio Brasil, Rio de Janeiro, Brazil	
Loss	67-18-4 (2)	(Italy) Mario Lenzi	PTS	10	1 February 1934	Estadio Brasil, Rio de Janeiro, Brazil	
Win	67-17-4 (2)	(Uruguay) Guillermo Silva	TKO	4 (10)	25 November 1933	Estadio Brasil, Rio de Janeiro, Brazil	
Win	66-17-4 (2)	(United States) Gene Brown	TKO	5 (10)	2 August 1933	Chestnut St. Arena, Reno, Nevada, United States	
Win	65-17-4 (2)	(United States) Kenneth Lee	TKO	3 (10)	28 July 1933	F.D.E.S. Hall, Newman, California, United States	
Loss	64-17-4 (2)	(United States) KO Christner	PTS	10	12 July 1933	Auditorium, Oakland, California, United States	
Loss	64-16-4 (2)	(United States) Gene Stanton	KO	9 (10)	24 May 1933	Casino, Fall River, Massachusetts, United States	
Win	64-15-4 (2)	(United States) Gene Stanton	PTS	10	26 April 1933	Casino, Fall River, Massachusetts, United States	
Win	63-15-4 (2)	(United States) Johnny Dixon	TKO	3 (6)	2 March 1933	Boston Garden, Boston, Massachusetts, United States	
Win	62-15-4 (2)	(United States) Jim Maloney	TKO	5 (10)	20 January 1933	Boston Garden, Boston, Massachusetts, United States	Stopped after round 4 due to a cut
Win	61-15-4 (2)	(Croatia) Vinko Jakasa	KO	2 (10)	19 December 1932	New Bedford, Massachusetts, United States	
Loss	60-15-4 (2)	(Italy) Primo Carnera	TKO	6 (10)	18 November 1932	Madison Square Garden, New York City, New York, United States	Santa down in the 2nd, 3rd and 6th, referee stoppage.
Win	60-14-4 (2)	(United States) Sammy Ward	PTS	10	28 October 1932	North Street Rink, Salem, Massachusetts, United States	
Win	59-14-4 (2)	(United States) Jack Meyer	TKO	2 (10)	14 September 1932	10th Street Arena, Modesto, California, United States	
Win	58-14-4 (2)	(United States) Bucky Harris	TKO	2 (10)	2 September 1932	Stockton, California, United States	
Loss	57-14-4 (2)	(United States) Ray Impelletiere	TKO	9 (10)	8 August 1932	Auditorium, Oakland, California, United States	
Win	57-13-4 (2)	(United States) Jack Gardner	KO	2 (10)	23 July 1932	Chestnut St. Arena, Reno, Nevada, United States	
Win	56-13-4 (2)	(United States) Cecyl Myart	KO	5 (10)	13 July 1932	Auditorium, Oakland, California, United States	
Win	55-13-4 (2)	(United States) Ernie Stout	TKO	2 (10)	24 November 1931	Tulare County Fairgrounds, Tulare, California, United States	
Loss	54-13-4 (2)	(United States) Max Baer	KO	10 (10)	21 October 1931	Arcadia Pavilion, Oakland, California, United States	
Draw	54-12-4 (2)	(New Zealand) Tom Heeney	PTS	12	5 October 1931	Rhode Island Auditorium, Providence, Rhode Island, United States	
Loss	54-12-3 (2)	(New Zealand) Tom Heeney	PTS	12	10 September 1931	Mark's Stadium, Tiverton, Rhode Island, United States	
Win	54-11-3 (2)	(United States) Leon Chavelier	PTS	10	3 August 1931	Auditorium, Oakland, California, United States	
Win	53-11-3 (2)	(Italy) Roberto Roberti	PTS	10	15 July 1931	Auditorium, Oakland, California, United States	
Win	52-11-3 (2)	(Germany) Hans Birkie	RTD	6 (10)	1 July 1931	Auditorium, Oakland, California, United States	Taking a beating during the entire bout, Birkie quit at the end of round 6 claiming a broken hand
Loss	51-11-3 (2)	(Germany) Hans Birkie	PTS	10	8 June 1931	Auditorium, Oakland, California, United States	
Win	51-10-3 (2)	(United States) Johnny Grosso	KO	2 (10)	11 May 1931	Auditorium, Oakland, California, United States	
Win	50-10-3 (2)	(United States) Jack Beasley	KO	1 (10)	27 April 1931	Auditorium, Oakland, California, United States	
Win	49-10-3 (2)	(Italy) Salvatore Ruggirello	KO	6 (10)	20 March 1931	Rhode Island Auditorium, Providence, Rhode Island, United States	Ruggirello down 13 times
Win	48-10-3 (2)	(United States) Jack Singer	KO	1 (?)	12 March 1931	Clark's Audtorium, Newark, New Jersey, United States	
Loss	47-10-3 (2)	(Italy) Salvatore Ruggirello	KO	2 (10)	5 March 1931	Rhode Island Auditorium, Providence, Rhode Island, United States	
NC	47-9-3 (2)	(Denmark) Knute Hansen	NC	2 (10)	4 February 1931	Chicago Stadium, Chicago, Illinois, United States	Declared a no contest when Hansen fell without being hit
Win	47-9-3 (1)	(United States) Jack Silver	KO	1 (?)	12 January 1931	Laurel Garden, Newark, New Jersey, United States	
Win	46-9-3 (1)	(Italy) Roberto Roberti	PTS	10	1 January 1931	Arena, Boston, Massachusetts, United States	
Win	45-9-3 (1)	(Cuba) Carl Carter	KO	3 (10)	31 October 1930	Providence, Rhode Island, United States	
Win	44-9-3 (1)	(United States) Tiny Hoffner	KO	1 (10)	21 October 1930	Broadway Arena, Brooklyn, New York, United States	
Win	43-9-3 (1)	(United States) Gordon Munce	TKO	3 (10)	13 October 1930	Providence, Rhode Island, United States	
Win	42-9-3 (1)	(Italy) Riccardo Bertazzolo	PTS	10	3 October 1930	Arena, Boston, Massachusetts, United States	
Win	41-9-3 (1)	(United States) Otis Gardner	KO	1 (10)	22 September 1930	Mark's Stadium, Tiverton, Rhode Island, United States	
Win	40-9-3 (1)	(Italy) Umberto Torriano	TKO	4 (10)	15 September 1930	Velodrome, Newark, New Jersey, United States	
Win	39-9-3 (1)	(United States) Emilio Solomon	PTS	10	10 September 1930	Salem, Massachusetts, United States	
Win	38-9-3 (1)	(United States) Jack Shaw	KO	2 (?)	5 September 1930	Velodrome, Newark, New Jersey, United States	
Win	37-9-3 (1)	(United States) Al Tottinger	KO	2 (10)	22 August 1930	Bayonne, New Jersey, United States	
Win	36-9-3 (1)	(United States) Al Shearing	KO	3 (10)	14 August 1930	Playgrounds Stadium, West New York, New Jersey, United States	
Win	35-9-3 (1)	(Spain) Andres Castano	KO	3 (10)	1 August 1930	Miller Stadium, West New York, New Jersey, United States	
Loss	34-9-3 (1)	(Germany) Ernst Guehring	PTS	10	11 April 1930	Festhalle Frankfurt, Germany	
Win	34-8-3 (1)	(Germany) Rudi Wagener	PTS	10	2 February 1930	Westfalenhalle, Dortmund, Germany	
Win	33-8-3 (1)	(Germany) Ernst Roesemann	TKO	5 (10)	5 January 1930	Westfalenhalle, Dortmund, Germany	
Draw	32-8-3 (1)	(United Kingdom) Jack Stanley	PTS	10	17 December 1929	Royal Albert Hall, Kensington, United Kingdom	
Win	32-8-2 (1)	(France) Robert Villard	TKO	2 (10)	7 December 1929	Velodrome d'Hiver, Paris, France	
Loss	31-8-2 (1)	(Germany) Hans Schoenrath	PTS	8	22 November 1929	Sportpalast, Berlin, Germany	
Win	31-7-2 (1)	(United Kingdom) Jack Stanley	PTS	10	1 November 1929	Estadio do Covelo, Gondomar, Portugal	
Loss	30-7-2 (1)	(Belgium) Pierre Charles	PTS	15	30 June 1929	Praca de Touros do Campo Pequeno, Lisbon, Portugal	European title fight
Win	30-6-2 (1)	(France) Constant Barrick	KO	2 (10)	14 April 1929	Praca de Touros do Campo Pequeno, Lisbon, Portugal	
Win	29-6-2 (1)	(Belgium) Jack Humbeeck	KO	6 (10)	6 March 1929	Palacio de Cristal, Porto, Portugal	
Loss	28-6-2 (1)	(Italy) Armando de Carolis	PTS	12	3 November 1928	Campo de Moraes e Silva, Rio de Janeiro, Brazil	
Loss	28-5-2 (1)	(Italy) Armando de Carolis	PTS	10	5 August 1928	Estadio da Floresta, São Paulo, Brazil	
Win	28-4-2 (1)	(Argentina) Orlando Reverberi	PTS	10	9 June 1928	Campo de Moraes e Silva, Rio de Janeiro, Brazil	
Win	27-4-2 (1)	(Argentina) Epifanio Islas	PTS	12	15 April 1928	Estadio da Floresta, São Paulo, Brazil	
Win	26-4-2 (1)	(Argentina) Carlos Oldani	PTS	12	22 December 1927	Estadio Manoel Schwartz, Rio de Janeiro, Brazil	
Loss	25-4-2 (1)	(Argentina) Carlos Oldani	PTS	10	14 November 1927	Campo Riachuelo, Rio de Janeiro, Brazil	
Win	25-3-2 (1)	(Spain) Paul Rod	KO	1 (10)	23 October 1927	Estadio da Floresta, São Paulo, Brazil	
Win	24-3-2 (1)	(Argentina) Epifanio Islas	PTS	15	7 September 1927	Campo Riachuelo, Rio de Janeiro, Brazil	
Win	23-3-2 (1)	(Argentina) Juan Moragues	PTS	10	5 July 1927	Campo Riachuelo, Rio de Janeiro, Brazil	
Win	22-3-2 (1)	(France) Paul Hams	KO	15 (15)	4 June 1927	Campo Riachuelo, Rio de Janeiro, Brazil	
Win	21-3-2 (1)	(Argentina) Miguel Ferrara	DQ	9 (10)	14 May 1927	Teatro Republica, Rio de Janeiro, Brazil	
Win	20-3-2 (1)	(Uruguay) Jaime Escobar	KO	2 (10)	4 March 1927	Teatro Republica, Rio de Janeiro, Brazil	
Win	19-3-2 (1)	(Estonia) Erwin Klausner	TKO	2 (10)	1 January 1927	Teatro Republica, Rio de Janeiro, Brazil	
Loss	18-3-2 (1)	(Argentina) Epifanio Islas	PTS	10	1 December 1926	Estadio Manoel Schwartz, Rio de Janeiro, Brazil	
Loss	18-2-2 (1)	(Argentina) Epifanio Islas	PTS	10	17 November 1926	Estadio da Floresa, São Paulo, Brazil	
Win	18-1-2 (1)	(France) Paul Hams	PTS	10	7 September 1926	Campo do Botafogo, Rio de Janeiro, Brazil	
Draw	17-1-2(1)	(Argentina) Miguel Ferrara	PTS	10	24 July 1926	Campo do Botafogo, Rio de Janeiro, Brazil	
Win	17-1-1 (1)	(Argentina) Roberto di Lorenzo	KO	1 (10)	10 July 1926	Campo do Botafogo, Rio de Janeiro, Brazil	
Win	16-1-1 (1)	(France) Marc Lunaud	KO	6 (10)	7 May 1926	Coliseu dos Recreios, Lisbon, Portugal	
Win	15-1-1 (1)	(Hungary) Rozi	KO	2 (10)	21 April 1926	Coliseu dos Recreios, Lisbon, Portugal	
Win	14-1-1 (1)	(United Kingdom) Joe Mullings	DQ	3 (10)	12 April 1926	Palacio de Cristal, Porto, Portugal	
Draw	13-1-1 (1)	(France) Constant Barrick	PTS	10 (10)	30 March 1926	Coliseu dos Recreios, Lisbon, Portugal	
NC	13-1 (1)	(Canada) Soldier Jones	NC	1 (10)	18 February 1926	Coliseu dos Recreios, Lisbon, Portugal	Fight stopped after first round due to very poor quality
Win	13-1	(United Kingdom) Guardsman Charlie Penwill	KO	3 (10)	11 February 1926	Coliseu dos Recreios, Lisbon, Portugal	
Win	12-1	(France) Constant Barrick	PTS	10	8 January 1926	Coliseu dos Recreios, Lisbon, Portugal	
Win	11-1	(United States) Jack Taylor	PTS	12	22 December 1925	Porto, Portugal	
Loss	10-1	(Belgium) Jack Humbeeck	PTS	10	3 November 1925	Palacio de Cristal Porto, Portugal	
Win	10-0	(Belgium) Jack Humbeeck	PTS	10	9 September 1925	Palacio de Cristal Porto, Portugal	
Win	9-0	(Spain) Andres Balsa	TKO	2 (10)	19 August 1925	Palacio de Cristal Porto, Portugal	
Win	8-0	(France) Laurent Mahieu	TKO	1 (10)	4 August 1925	Porto, Portugal	
Win	7-0	(France) Marcel Nilles	TKO	3 (10)	26 July 1925	Estadio do Lumiar, Lisbon, Portugal	
Win	6-0	(France) Paul Journee	KO	2 (10)	20 June 1925	Porto, Portugal	
Win	5-0	(France) Laurent Mahieu	PTS	10	4 June 1925	Coliseu dos Recreios, Lisbon, Portugal	
Win	4-0	(France) Leon Derensy	KO	1 (10)	12 May 1925	Porto, Portugal	
Win	3-0	(France) Arthur Vermaut	TKO	2 (10)	22 April 1925	Coliseu dos Recreios, Lisbon, Portugal	
Win	2-0	(Poland) Georges Morgan	TKO	4 (10)	8 April 1925	Coliseu dos Recreios, Lisbon, Portugal	
Win	1-0	(France) Albert Demoor	KO	2	3 April 1925	Palacio de Cristal, Porto, Portugal	
