= George Godfrey (boxer, born 1897) =

American boxer (1897–1947)

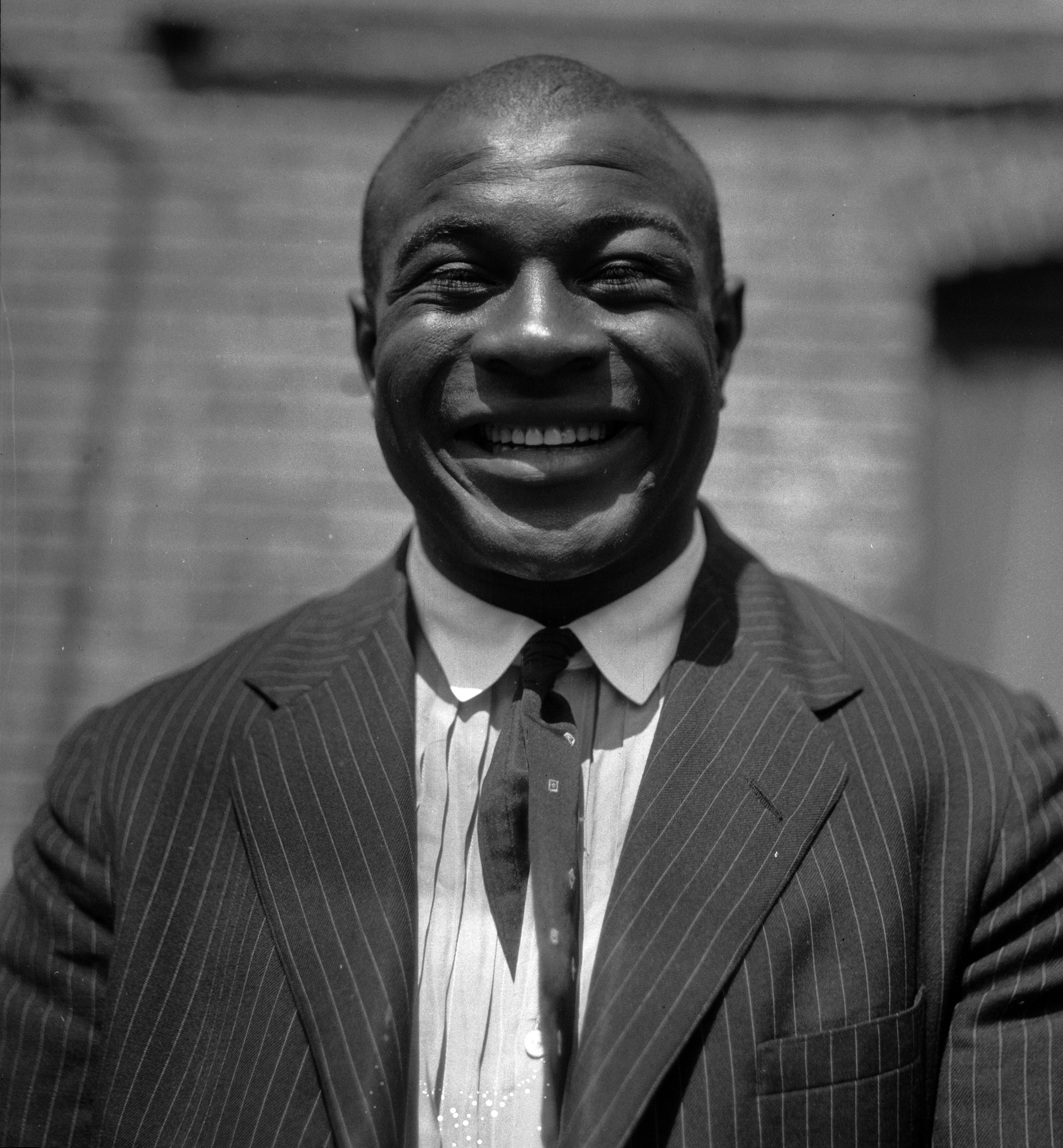

Personal information
- Nickname: The Leiperville Shadow
- Nationality: American
- Born: Feab Smith Williams; January 25, 1897 Mobile, Alabama, U.S.
- Died: August 13, 1947 (aged 50) Los Angeles, California, U.S.
- Height: 6 ft 3 in (1.91 m)
- Weight: Heavyweight

Boxing career
- Reach: 79.5 in (202 cm)
- Stance: Orthodox

Boxing record
- Total fights: 124
- Wins: 97
- Win by KO: 79
- Losses: 21
- Draws: 2

George Godfrey (II) The Leiperville Shadow (January 25, 1897 – August 13, 1947) was the ring name of Feab Smith Williams, a heavyweight boxer from the state of Alabama who fought from 1919 to 1937. He named himself after George "Old Chocolate" Godfrey, a Black Canadian boxer from the bare-knuckle boxing days who had been a top name during the John L. Sullivan era. Old Chocolate had been the fourth fighter to reign as World Colored Heavyweight Champion while the second George Godfrey was the 20th fighter to hold the colored heavyweight title.

The colored heavyweight title was recognized due to the color bar in pro boxing in the 19th and early 20th centuries, when white champions drew the color line and would not defend the title against a black man. In the heavyweight division, the color bar was adamantly defended by Old Chocolate Godfrey's contemporary, "The Boston Strong Boy", John L. Sullivan. Ironically, it remained in force even after colored heavyweight title holder Jack Johnson won the world's heavyweight title in 1908. Johnson never fought black opponents either, allegedly because such top promoters as Tex Rickard believed that a fight between two black boxers would not draw at the gate. He was also the only man to ever defeat the 7 foot 9 inch giant Gogea Mitu.

Because of the color bar in the heavyweight division that continued until the rise of Joe Louis in the 1930s, the second Godfrey Williams never fought for the world heavyweight championship, like the man he had named himself after. He did win the International Boxing Union's version of the world heavyweight championship in 1935, two years before Louis became the second black man to become the universally recognized world heavyweight champ.

== Boxing career ==
Boxing's second George Godfrey fought ring legend Sam Langford three times. Godfrey, who was 6 ft 3 in (1.91 m) tall and weighed between 220 and 260 lb (118 kg) during his career, dwarfed the 5 ft 8 in (1.73 m) Langford. Despite his advantage in size, height and weight, Godfrey was knocked out in two of the three matches in 1920 and 1921. He did manage a draw in his first bout with Langford in 1920.

Godfrey is said to have been instructed by promoters on a number of occasions to carry opponents if he wanted to receive more important fights. He managed wins over several top contenders including Fred Fulton and Bill Tate by 1925, though showed he could be outpointed, as he was outboxed over 10 rounds in 1926 by future legendary champion Jack Sharkey and in 1928 by Johnny Risko, while he outpointed Paolino Uzcudun in 1928.

=== World Colored Heavyweight Championship ===
Godfrey twice won the World Colored Heavyweight Championship. When Harry Wills was stripped of the title after losing by disqualification to Jack Sharkey on October 12, 1926, Godfrey defeated Larry Gains on November 8, 1926, at Broadway Auditorium in Buffalo, New York, on a TKO in the sixth round. Godfrey made three defenses of the title, which was retaken by Gaines on August 15, 1928, in Buffalo when Godfrey was disqualified.

The title was later vacated, and Godfrey won it a second time on August 24, 1931, in Toronto, Canada, when he defeated Seal Harris, whom he knocked out in the second round. He defended it three more times before losing to Obidiah "Obie" Walker on points in a 10-round fight held in Philadelphia on October 9, 1933. In the interim between the two titles, he fought Bearcat Wright for the "Black Heavyweight Championship" on December 19, 1930, in Atlanta, Georgia, but the 10-round fight was a draw.

=== Carnera fight ===
Two months before Godfrey fought Primo Carnera, Carnera fought Bombo Chevalier and it ended with extreme controversy when one of Chevalier's seconds threw in the towel. Chevalier's manager stated "the towel should not have been thrown in." In an investigation, Chevalier said he had been approached earlier about a "fake fight," but had declined. No one had expected the towel to be thrown in. In response to the towel throwing controversy, seconds were forbidden from throwing in the towel in Carnera vs. Godfrey.

Many observers considered the 1930 Carnera fight to be fixed. According to boxing historian Herbert Goldman (managing editor of The Ring 1978-1987), Carnera was "very much mob controlled." Godfrey was disqualified for an intentional low blow in the fifth round when he was clearly getting the better of Carnera. In the aftermath, Godfrey lost his boxing license and half his purse, Carnera was cleared. Godfrey was the 4th boxer that year to lose his license after fighting Carnera. The suspension would last 2 years. Godfrey's suspension by the National Boxing Association, which represented 13 states, forced Godfrey out of the biggest venues in the United States. Resulting in him touring the world. The suspension included Godfrey's manager, Jimmy Dougherty, as well as every fighter represented by Dougherty.

=== IBU title ===
Godfrey would go to Europe later in his career and win the International Boxing Union World Heavyweight title. In late 1934, the IBU had ordered world champion Max Baer to defend his title against the reigning European champion, Pierre Charles of Belgium. When Baer instead opted to fight James J. Braddock, they withdrew recognition of him as champion.

Subsequently, the IBU matched Charles with Godfrey for their version of the title with the fight taking place in Brussels, Belgium on October 2, 1935. Godfrey won a fifteen-round decision on points, but did not press any claim to the championship and it was inactive for the next two years. The IBU then recognized Baer's successor Braddock, as champion.

== Death and honours ==
Godfrey died on August 13, 1947, in his home and was found a week later, aged 50. His funeral was attended by many boxers, including former heavyweight champion Jack Dempsey, former light heavyweight champion Jack Root, former middleweight champion Gorilla Jones, and others included footballer Dick Donald and boxing manager Mike McNulty.

In 2003, Godfrey was named to the Ring magazine's list of 100 greatest punchers of all time.

In 2007, he was elected into the International Boxing Hall of Fame.

Godfrey had a brief career in movies making five motion pictures from 1926 to 1937. His most famous role was as the cook in Paramount Pictures's 1926 Old Ironsides. His final role was as himself in MGM's Big City which starred Spencer Tracy.

== Professional boxing record ==
126 fights	98 wins	21 losses
By knockout	80	6
By decision	16	6
By disqualification	2	9
Draws	2	
No contests	5	

No.	Result	Record	Opponent	Type	Round, time	Date	Location	Notes
126	Loss	98–21–2 (5)	Hank Hankinson	TKO	8 (10), 1:34	Aug 10, 1937	Olympic Auditorium, Los Angeles, California, US	
125	Win	98–20–2 (5)	Billy Wells	KO	2 (10), 1:34	Aug 11, 1936	Griffith Stadium, Washington, DC, US	
124	Win	97–20–2 (5)	Pierre Charles	PTS	15	Oct 2, 1935	Palais des Sports, Schaerbeek, Belgium	Won vacant International Boxing Union World Heavyweight title
123	Loss	96–20–2 (5)	Motzi Spakow	DQ	4 (10)	Jun 15, 1935	Roman Arenas, Bucharest, Romania	Godfrey DQ'd for hitting Spakow in the kidneys
122	Win	96–19–2 (5)nion	Dumitru Pavelescu	KO	2 (10)	Jun 7, 1935	Venus Arena, Bucharest, Romania	
121	Win	95–19–2 (5)	Piet van Gool	PTS	10	Dec 12, 1934	Eden Theater, Leuven, Belgium	
120	Win	94–19–2 (5)	Arthur Meurant	TKO	5 (10)	Dec 6, 1934	Cinema Imperial, Binche, Belgium	
119	Win	93–19–2 (5)	Hans Schonrath	TKO	3 (10)	Nov 14, 1934	Palais d'Ete, Brussels, Belgium	
118	NC	92–19–2 (5)	Mauro Galusso	NC	3 (10)	Aug 25, 1934	Estadio Brasil, Río de Janeiro, Brazil	Stopped for "stalling"
117	Win	92–19–2 (4)	Giacomo Bergomas	KO	6 (10)	Aug 18, 1934	Estadio Paulista, Sao Paulo, Brazil	
116	NC	91–19–2 (4)	Andres Castano	NC	? (10)	Jul 14, 1934	Santos Rink, Santos, Brazil	Result unknown
115	Win	91–19–2 (3)	Valentin Campolo	PTS	10	Jun 30, 1934	Estadio Brasil, Río de Janeiro, Brazil	
114	Loss	90–19–2 (3)	Obie Walker	PTS	10	Oct 9, 1933	Arena, Philadelphia, Pennsylvania, US	Lost world colored heavyweight title
113	NC	90–18–2 (3)	Bearcat Wright	NC	6 (10)	Feb 10, 1933	Convention Hall, Kansas City, Missouri, US	World colored heavyweight title at stake; Stopped for "stalling"
112	Win	90–18–2 (2)	Tiger Jack Fox	PTS	10	Jan 31, 1933	Armory, Indianapolis, Indiana, US	Retained world colored heavyweight title
111	Loss	89–18–2 (2)	Walter Cobb	UD	10	Dec 29, 1932	Convention Hall, Philadelphia, Pennsylvania, US	
110	Win	89–17–2 (2)	Walter Cobb	PTS	10	Dec 12, 1932	Arena, Philadelphia, Pennsylvania, US	
109	Win	88–17–2 (2)	Al Fay	TKO	8 (20)	Oct 24, 1932	Arena, Philadelphia, Pennsylvania, US	
108	Win	87–17–2 (2)	Roy Clark	KO	5 (20)	Sep 5, 1932	Arena Tex Rickard, Nuevo Laredo, Mexico	Retained world colored heavyweight title
107	Win	86–17–2 (2)	Gene Stanton	KO	3 (?)	May 31, 1932	Lakeside Stadium, Canton, Ohio, US	Second fight in one day
106	Win	85–17–2 (2)	K.O. Willis	KO	2 (?)	May 31, 1932	Lakeside Stadium, Canton, Ohio, US	
105	Win	84–17–2 (2)	Texas Tanner	KO	2 (?)	May 30, 1932	Lakeside Stadium, Canton, Ohio, US	
104	Win	83–17–2 (2)	Billy Williams	KO	1 (4)	May 24, 1932	Barnes Auditorium, Alliance, Ohio, US	
103	Win	82–17–2 (2)	Kid Moran	KO	2 (5)	May 19, 1932	Pontiac A.C., Pontiac, Michigan, US	Second fight in one day
102	Win	81–17–2 (2)	Harry Johnson	KO	1 (5), 0:20	May 19, 1932	Pontiac A.C., Pontiac, Michigan, US	
101	Win	80–17–2 (2)	K.O. Harper	KO	2 (10)	May 10, 1932	Mount Clemens, Michigan, US	Exact date unknown
100	Win	79–17–2 (2)	Flash Ryser	KO	2 (10)	May 3, 1932	Monroe, Michigan, US	
99	Loss	78–17–2 (2)	Jack Gross	PTS	10	Nov 17, 1931	Olympic Auditorium, Los Angeles, California, US	
98	Win	78–16–2 (2)	Seal Harris	KO	2 (10), 1:35	Aug 24, 1931	Arena Gardens, Toronto, Canada	Won vacant world colored heavyweight title
97	Win	77–16–2 (2)	George Gemas	KO	2 (?), 1:22	Jul 13, 1931	Arena Gardens, Toronto, Canada	
96	Win	76–16–2 (2)	Ricardo Rosel	KO	1 (20), 0:53	Feb 23, 1931	Plaza de Toros, Nuevo Laredo, Mexico	Won vacant Mexico heavyweight title
95	Win	75–16–2 (2)	Salvatore Ruggirello	KO	1 (10), 2:25	Jan 1, 1931	El Toreo de Cuatro Caminos, Mexico City, Mexico	
94	Draw	74–16–2 (2)	Bearcat Wright	PTS	10	Dec 19, 1930	City Auditorium, Atlanta, Georgia, US	For vacant Black American heavyweight title
93	Win	74–16–1 (2)	Seal Harris	KO	3 (5)	Dec 8, 1930	Auditorium, Milwaukee, Wisconsin, US	
92	Win	73–16–1 (2)	Seal Harris	KO	4 (10)	Nov 7, 1930	Prudden Auditorium, Lansing, Michigan, US	
91	Win	72–16–1 (2)	Jack Leslie	KO	3 (10)	Aug 29, 1930	Columbia Arena, Evansville, Indiana, US	
90	Win	71–16–1 (2)	Arthur De Kuh	KO	4 (10)	Aug 26, 1930	Taylor Bowl, Newburgh Heights, Ohio, US	
89	Win	70–16–1 (2)	Elijah Lee	KO	2 (10)	Aug 20, 1930	Tomlinson Hall, Indianapolis, Indiana, US	
88	Win	69–16–1 (2)	Frankie Simms	TKO	2 (12)	Jul 8, 1930	Taylor Bowl, Newburgh Heights, Ohio, US	
87	Loss	68–16–1 (2)	Primo Carnera	DQ	5 (10), 1:13	Jun 23, 1930	Shibe Park, Philadelphia, Pennsylvania, US	
86	Win	68–15–1 (2)	Jack Rozier	TKO	1 (10)	May 16, 1930	Maryland Ball Park, Baltimore, Maryland, US	
85	Win	67–15–1 (2)	Roy Clark	KO	7 (10)	Mar 24, 1930	Arena, Philadelphia, Pennsylvania, US	
84	Win	66–15–1 (2)	Jack Gross	TKO	5 (10)	Mar 10, 1930	Arena, Philadelphia, Pennsylvania, US	
83	Win	65–15–1 (2)	Tom Hawkins	KO	3 (?)	Dec 23, 1929	Roanoke, Virginia, US	
82	NC	64–15–1 (2)	Jimmy Byrne	NC	7 (10)	Nov 7, 1929	Arena, Boston, Massachusetts, US	Called NC by the referee because of a "lack of action"
81	Loss	64–15–1 (1)	Long Tom Hawkins	DQ	3 (10)	Aug 13, 1929	Olympic Auditorium, Los Angeles, California, US	
80	Win	64–14–1 (1)	Ralph Smith	TKO	2 (10)	Jul 15, 1929	Grand Rapids, Michigan, US	
79	Win	63–14–1 (1)	Chuck Wiggins	TKO	7 (12)	Jun 26, 1929	Taylor Bowl, Newburgh Heights, Ohio, US	
78	Win	62–14–1 (1)	Jimmy Byrne	TKO	7 (10)	Jun 3, 1929	Baker Bowl, Philadelphia, Pennsylvania, US	
77	Win	61–14–1 (1)	Farmer Lodge	KO	2 (10)	Apr 15, 1929	Jackson, Michigan, US	
76	Win	60–14–1 (1)	Bill Hartwell	KO	2 (10)	Apr 5, 1929	Tinker Field, Orlando, Florida, US	
75	Win	59–14–1 (1)	Francisco Cruz Coelho	KO	2 (10)	Jan 14, 1929	Antler's Auditorium, Lorain, Ohio, US	
74	Loss	58–14–1 (1)	Al Walker	DQ	3 (10)	Jan 7, 1929	Arena, Philadelphia, Pennsylvania, US	Godfrey DQ'd for a low blow
73	Win	58–13–1 (1)	Jim Sigman	KO	2 (10)	Dec 12, 1928	Fremont Theatre, Fremont, Ohio, US	
72	Win	57–13–1 (1)	Clem Johnson	KO	3 (?)	Dec 3, 1928	Richmond, Virginia, US	
71	Win	56–13–1 (1)	Bud Gorman	TKO	3 (10), 2:40	Nov 12, 1928	Arena, Philadelphia, Pennsylvania, US	
70	Win	55–13–1 (1)	Benny Hill	KO	1 (10)	Oct 12, 1928	Broadway Auditorium, Buffalo, New York, US	
69	Win	54–13–1 (1)	Pierre Charles	KO	2 (10), 1:45	Aug 31, 1928	Navin Field, Detroit, Michigan, US	
68	Win	53–13–1 (1)	Tut Jackson	TKO	4 (10)	Aug 21, 1928	Memorial Stadium, Greensboro, North Carolina, US	
67	Loss	52–13–1 (1)	Larry Gains	DQ	3 (10), 1:20	Aug 15, 1928	Maple Leaf Stadium, Toronto, Ontario, Canada	Lost world colored heavyweight title; Godfrey DQ'd for low blow
66	Loss	52–12–1 (1)	Johnny Risko	PTS	10	Jun 27, 1928	Ebbets Field, New York City, New York, US	
65	Win	52–11–1 (1)	Paulino Uzcudun	PTS	10	Feb 28, 1928	Wrigley Field, Los Angeles, California, US	
64	Win	51–11–1 (1)	Joe White	TKO	1 (8)	Jan 23, 1928	Waltz Dream Arena, Atlantic City, New Jersey, US	
63	Win	50–11–1 (1)	Soldier Jones	KO	1 (10)	Dec 26, 1927	Motor Square Garden, Pittsburgh, Pennsylvania, US	
62	Win	49–11–1 (1)	Andre DeRosa	KO	2 (10)	Dec 5, 1927	Canton Auditorium, Canton, Ohio, US	
61	Win	48–11–1 (1)	Jack Townsend	PTS	4	Nov 22, 1927	Olympia Boxing Club, New York City, New York, US	
60	Win	47–11–1 (1)	Clem Johnson	KO	1 (8)	Nov 21, 1927	Waltz Dream Arena, Atlantic City, New Jersey, US	Retained world colored heavyweight title
59	Win	46–11–1 (1)	Tom Sayers	KO	1 (10)	Oct 31, 1927	Arena, Philadelphia, Pennsylvania, US	
58	Win	45–11–1 (1)	Monte Munn	TKO	4 (12), 2:20	Sep 14, 1927	Ebbets Field, New York City, New York, US	
57	Win	44–11–1 (1)	Henry van Patten	KO	2 (10)	Sep 8, 1927	Culver City Stadium, Culver City, Pennsylvania, US	
56	Win	43–11–1 (1)	Jim Maloney	KO	1 (10), 1:25	Aug 15, 1927	Shibe Park, Philadelphia, Pennsylvania, US	
55	Win	42–11–1 (1)	Neil Clisby	KO	7 (10)	Jul 5, 1927	Olympic Auditorium, Los Angeles, California, US	Retained world colored heavyweight title
54	Win	41–11–1 (1)	Jake Kilrain	PTS	10	Jun 23, 1927	Culver City Stadium, Culver City, California, US	
53	Win	40–11–1 (1)	Long Tom Hawkins	KO	7 (10)	May 13, 1927	Coliseum, San Diego, California, US	
52	Win	39–11–1 (1)	Jack Roper	TKO	5 (10)	May 5, 1927	Culver City Stadium, Culver City, California, US	
51	Win	38–11–1 (1)	Leon Chevalier	KO	4 (10)	Apr 18, 1927	Wrigley Field, Los Angeles, California, US	
50	Win	37–11–1 (1)	Jack Roper	KO	9 (10)	Apr 6, 1927	Auditorium, Oakland, California, US	
49	Win	36–11–1 (1)	Tony Fuente	TKO	2 (10)	Mar 29, 1927	Olympic Auditorium, Los Angeles, California, US	
48	Win	35–11–1 (1)	Ralph Smith	TKO	9 (10)	Mar 8, 1927	Armory, Portland, Maine, US	
47	Win	34–11–1 (1)	Cowboy Billy Owens	TKO	8 (8)	Dec 3, 1926	Coliseum, Chicago, Illinois, US	
46	NC	33–11–1 (1)	Bearcat Wright	NC	10 (10)	Nov 23, 1926	Armory, Portland, Maine, US	World colored heavyweight title at stake; Fight stopped for "not trying"
45	Win	33–11–1	Larry Gains	RTD	6 (10), 3:00	Nov 8, 1926	Broadway Auditorium, Buffalo, New York, US	Won vacant world colored heavyweight title
44	Win	32–11–1	Jack Townsend	DQ	6 (10)	Nov 1, 1926	Madison Square Garden, New York City, New York, US	
43	Win	31–11–1	Bob Lawson	PTS	6	Sep 23, 1926	Sesquicentennial Stadium, Philadelphia, Pennsylvania, US	
42	Loss	30–11–1	Jack Sharkey	PTS	10	Sep 21, 1926	Mechanics Building, Boston, Massachusetts, US	
41	Win	30–10–1	Tiny Jim Herman	UD	10	Aug 24, 1926	Armory, Portland, Oregon, US	
40	Loss	29–10–1	Chuck Wiggins	DQ	7 (10)	Jun 9, 1926	Olympic Auditorium, Los Angeles, California, US	
39	Win	29–9–1	Sully Montgomery	DQ	7 (10)	Jan 6, 1926	Olympic Auditorium, Los Angeles, California, US	
38	Win	28–9–1	Martin Burke	PTS	10	Dec 23, 1925	Madison Square Garden, New York City, New York, US	
37	Win	27–9–1	Fred Fulton	KO	5 (10)	Dec 18, 1925	Kenwood Armory, Minneapolis, Minnesota, US	
36	Win	26–9–1	Battling Owens	KO	3 (15)	Dec 14, 1925	Coliseum Arena, New Orleans, Louisiana, US	
35	Win	25–9–1	Martin Burke	PTS	10	Sep 29, 1925	Maier Park, Vernon, California, US	
34	Win	24–9–1	Mike Conroy	TKO	2 (10)	Aug 26, 1925	Olympic Auditorium, Los Angeles, California, US	
33	Win	23–9–1	Tiny Jim Herman	TKO	3 (10)	Aug 4, 1925	Arena, Vernon, California, US	
32	Win	22–9–1	Jack Renault	PTS	10	Jun 6, 1925	Recreation Park, San Francisco, California, US	
31	Win	21–9–1	Sam Baker	KO	4 (10)	Apr 14, 1925	Arena, Vernon, California, US	
30	Win	20–9–1	Vic Alexander	TKO	6 (10)	Mar 21, 1925	Wilmington Baseball Park, Wilmington, California, US	
29	Win	19–9–1	Tut Jackson	KO	5 (12)	Feb 26, 1925	Madison Square Garden, New York City, New York, US	
28	Win	18–9–1	Soldier George Jones	KO	2 (10)	Jan 30, 1925	Pottsville, Pennsylvania, US	
27	Win	17–9–1	Joe White	TKO	1 (10)	Dec 1, 1924	Arena, Philadelphia, Pennsylvania, US	
26	Loss	16–9–1	Jack Renault	PTS	10	Sep 8, 1924	Shibe Park, Philadelphia, Pennsylvania, US	
25	Loss	16–8–1	Jack Townsend	DQ	1 (12)	Jul 19, 1924	Commonwealth Sporting Club, New York City, New York, US	
24	Win	16–7–1	Jack Thompson	TKO	3 (10)	Jun 23, 1924	Shibe Park, Philadelphia, Pennsylvania, US	
23	Win	15–7–1	Farmer Lodge	KO	3 (10)	May 12, 1924	Arena, Philadelphia, Pennsylvania, US	
22	Loss	14–7–1	Tom Cowler	DQ	2 (10)	Mar 31, 1924	Arena, Philadelphia, Pennsylvania, US	Godfrey was DQ'd for hitting Cowler when he was down
21	Loss	14–6–1	Battling Owens	DQ	5 (12)	Dec 13, 1923	Oak Hill Auditorium, Youngstown, Ohio, US	
20	Win	14–5–1	Rough House Ware	KO	1 (10)	Dec 7, 1923	Golden Gate A.C., Philadelphia, Pennsylvania, US	
19	Win	13–5–1	Bill Tate	KO	7 (12)	Nov 2, 1923	Madison Square Garden, New York City, New York, US	
18	Win	12–5–1	Buddy Jackson	TKO	2 (8)	Sep 17, 1923	Smedley Field, Chester, Pennsylvania, US	
17	Loss	11–5–1	Jack Renault	KO	11 (12)	Mar 9, 1923	Pioneer Sporting Club, New York City, New York, US	
16	Win	11–4–1	Clem Johnson	PTS	12	Feb 27, 1923	Knickerbocker A.C. Arena, Albany, New York, US	
15	Win	10–4–1	Jim Pearson	KO	1 (6)	Feb 21, 1923	Madison Square Garden, New York City, New York, US	
14	Win	9–4–1	Jack Thompson	TKO	5 (12)	Dec 5, 1922	Pioneer Sporting Club, New York City, New York, US	
13	Win	8–4–1	George Ward	KO	5 (8)	Oct 20, 1922	Old Reliable A.C., Philadelphia, Pennsylvania, US	
12	Win	7–4–1	K.O. Gordon	KO	2 (?)	Jan 1, 1922	Exact location unknown, US	Exact date unknown
11	Loss	6–4–1	Sam Langford	KO	1 (12)	Aug 17, 1921	Riverside Arena, Covington, Kentucky, US	
10	Loss	6–3–1	Jack Thompson	KO	4 (?)	Feb 15, 1921	Saint Louis, Missouri, US	
9	Win	6–2–1	Young Norfolk	KO	1 (?)	Feb 1, 1921	Exact location unknown, US	Exact date unknown
8	Loss	5–2–1	Sam Langford	KO	2 (10)	Nov 17, 1920	Hot Springs, Arkansas, US	
7	Loss	5–1–1	Battling Norfolk	KO	5 (6), 2:00	Nov 1, 1920	Southern A.C., Memphis, Tennessee, US	
6	Win	5–0–1	Charlie Jude	KO	1 (?), 1:30	Aug 30, 1920	Southern A.C., Memphis, Tennessee, US	
5	Win	4–0–1	Baby Doll Green	KO	5 (?)	Jul 19, 1920	Southern A.C., Memphis, Tennessee, US	
4	Win	3–0–1	Bill Tate	PTS	10	Jul, 1920	Exact location unknown, US	Exact date unknown
3	Win	2–0–1	Battling Gahee	PTS	15	Jun, 1920	Exact location unknown, US	Exact date unknown
2	Draw	1–0–1	Sam Langford	PTS	10	May, 1920	Exact location unknown, Canada	Exact date unknown
1	Win	1–0	Eddie Jamison	KO	1 (?)	Dec, 1919	Exact location unknown, US	Exact date unknown

Awards and achievements
Preceded by Harry Wills (vacated)	World Colored Heavyweight Champion; November 8, 1926 – August 15, 1928	Succeeded by Larry Gains
Preceded by Larry Gains (vacated)	World Colored Heavyweight Champion; August 24, 1931 – October 8, 1933	Succeeded by Obie Walker
Titles in pretence
Vacant Title last held by Sam Langford	World Heavyweight Champion; IBU recognition October 2, 1935 – June 13, 1937	Vacant Title next held by Lee Savold
