= Love in the Ring =

1930 film

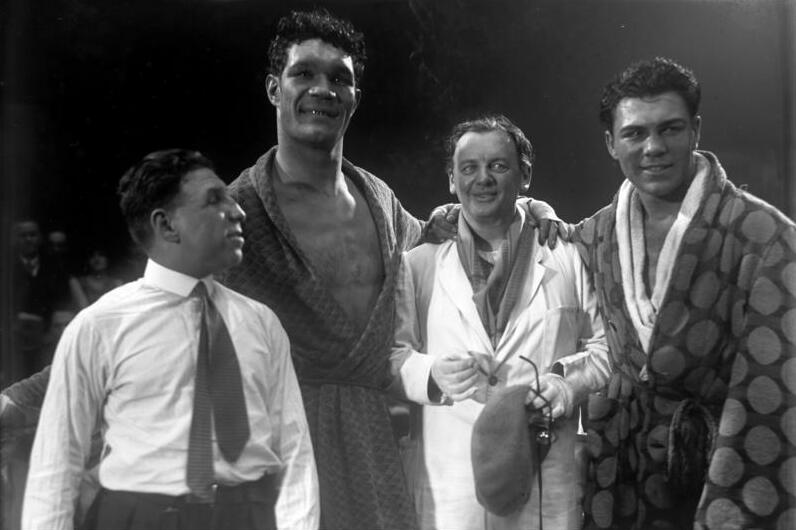
- From right to left: Max Schmeling, Reinhold Schünzel, Jose Santa and an unknown extra
- Directed by: Reinhold Schünzel
- Written by: Max Glass; Fritz Rotter
- Produced by: Max Glass
- Starring: Max Schmeling; Renate Müller; Olga Chekhova
- Cinematography: Nicolas Farkas
- Music by: Artur Guttmann; Will Meisel
- Production company: Terra Film
- Distributed by: Terra Film
- Release date: 17 March 1930
- Running time: 81 minutes
- Country: Germany
- Language: German

Love in the Ring (German: Liebe im Ring) is a 1930 German sports film directed by Reinhold Schünzel and starring Max Schmeling, Renate Müller, and Olga Chekhova. Schmeling was a leading German boxer of the 1930s, and the film attempted to capitalise on this. Schmeling later appeared in another boxing-themed film in Knockout (1935).

It was originally planned as a silent film, but sound was soon added as it became clear that silents were now unmarketable. The film's sets were designed by the art directors Otto Erdmann and Hans Sohnle. Some of the film was shot at the Berlin Sportpalast.

== Cast ==
- Max Schmeling as Max - Sohn der Obsthänderlin / Son of the Fruit seller
- Renate Müller as Hilde - Tochter des Fischhändlers / The Fish seller's daughter
- Olga Chekhova as Lilian
- Frida Richard as Maxs Mutter / Obsthändlerin / Fruit seller
- Rudolf Biebrach as Fischhändler / Fish seller
- Kurt Gerron as Max's Manager
- Max Machon as Erster Trainer
- Hugo Fischer-Köppe as Zweiter Trainer
- Julius Falkenstein as Ein Lebemann / A Bon-Vivant
- Yvette Darnys
- Arthur Duarte
- Emil Heyse
- Heinrich Gotho
- José Santa as Selbst / Himself
- Harry Stein as Selbst / Himself
- Paul Noack as Selbst / Himself
- Fritz Rolauf as Selbst / Himself
- Hermann Herse as Selbst / Himself
- Egon Stief as Selbst / Himself
- Felix Friedemann as Selbst / Himself
- Erich Kohler as Selbst / Himself
- Paul Samson-Körner as Unbestimmte Rolle / Undetermined Role
- Reinhold Schünzel as Unbestimmte Rolle / Undetermined Role

== Bibliography ==
- Waldman, Harry (2008). Nazi Films in America, 1933–1942. McFarland. ISBN 978-0-7864-3861-7.
