= Seal Harris =

American boxer (1906–??)

Personal information
- Nationality: American
- Born: Cecil Harris; January 20, 1906 Union Springs, Alabama
- Height: 6 ft 3.5 in (1.92 m)
- Weight: Heavyweight

Boxing career
- Stance: Orthodox

Boxing record
- Total fights: 53
- Wins: 22
- Win by KO: 8
- Losses: 18
- Draws: 5

Seal Harris (20 January 1906 – ?) was an African American heavyweight boxer who fought some of the top black boxers of the day and fought former colored heavyweight champion George Godfrey for the world colored heavyweight title vacated by Larry Gains. In the title bout held in Toronto, Canada's Arena Gardens on August 24, 1931, Godfrey prevailed by knocking out Harris at 1:35 in the second round.

Harris also fought former World Heavyweight Champ Primo Carnera in 1935, seven months after Carnera lost his world title to Max Baer. In São Paulo, Brazil, Harris lost to the ex-champion in what ended up as his last fight.

Born in Cecil Harris in Union Springs, Alabama on 20 January 1906, the 6′3½″ Harris fought at a weight of between 220 and 245 lbs. out of Chicago in a professional boxing career that spanned the years 1926 to 1935. He racked up a ring record of 22 wins (eight by KO) against 18 losses (he was KO-ed nine times) and five draws. He also lost three newspaper decisions.
