= Primo Carnera =

Italian boxer and professional wrestler (1906–1967)

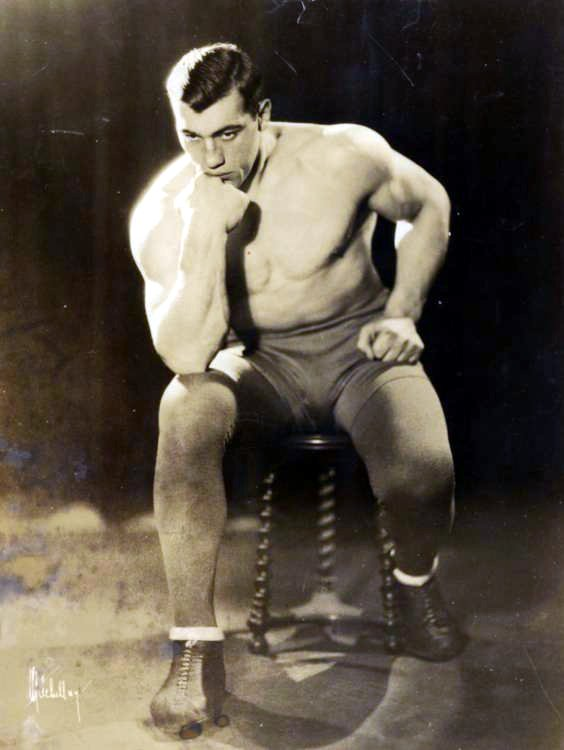

Personal information
- Nicknames: Da Preem; The Ambling Alp; The Italian Giant; The Vast Venetian; The Monster
- Nationality: Italian; American
- Born: 26 October 1906 Sequals, Italy
- Died: 29 June 1967 (aged 60) Sequals, Italy
- Height: 6 ft 5 in (196 cm)
- Weight: 270 lb (122 kg)

Boxing career
- Weight class: Heavyweight
- Reach: 85 in (216 cm)
- Stance: Orthodox

Boxing record
- Total fights: 103; with the inclusion of newspaper decisions
- Wins: 88 (official); 89 (unofficial)
- Win by KO: 71
- Losses: 14

Primo Carnera (Italian pronunciation: [ˈpriːmo karˈnɛːra]; 26 October 1906 – 29 June 1967) was the first Italian Heavyweight Champion boxer, holding the title from 1933 to 1934. Nicknamed the Ambling Alp, he was best known for his immense size and status as one of the most physically imposing heavyweights in boxing history. At 6 feet 5 inches (1.96 m) tall and weighing more than 275 pounds (125 kg), Carnera became the World Heavyweight Champion after defeating Jack Sharkey by knockout.

Carnera was a major box-office attraction during the 1930s, regularly drawing large crowds due to his sheer size and spectacle. He set many attendance records during the height of the Great Depression. Later active as a professional wrestler and film actor, he appeared alongside Max Baer and Jack Dempsey in the Oscar-nominated film The Prizefighter and the Lady (1933). Primo's life is crudely mirrored in the Humphrey Bogart film The Harder They Fall (1956). He sued the producers for invasion of privacy but was unsuccessful.

== Personal life ==
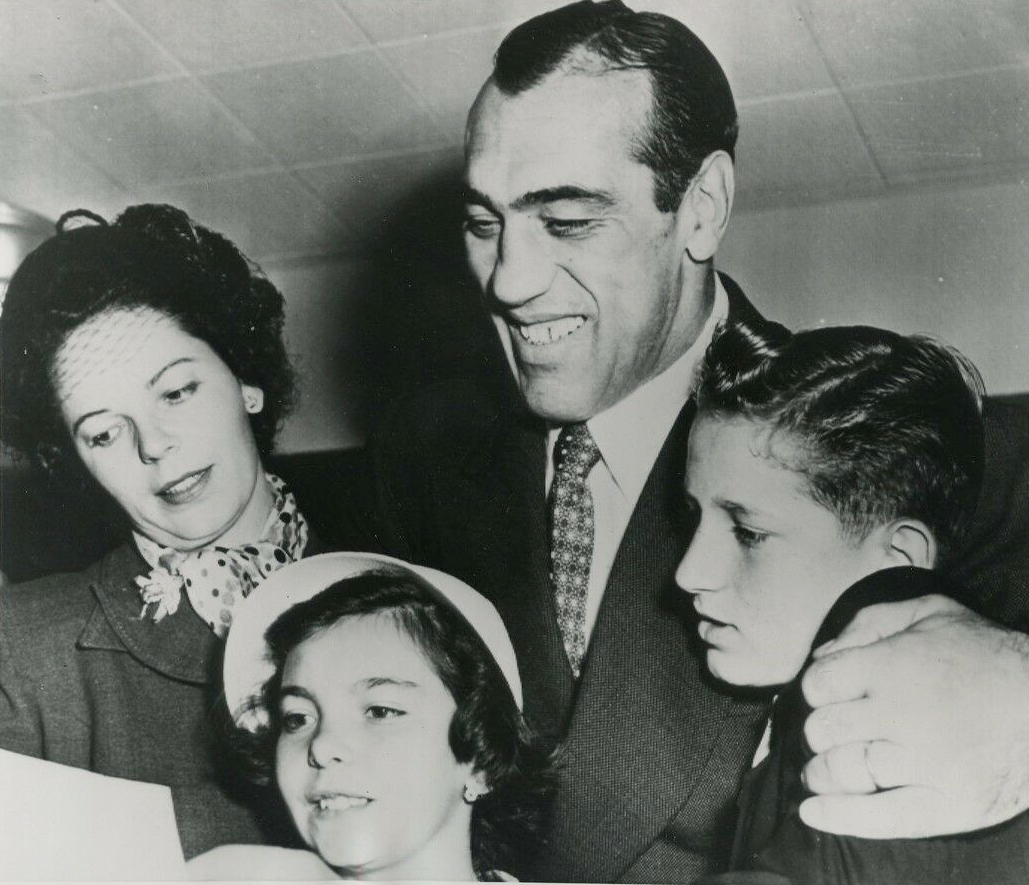
Carnera with family receiving dual citizenship in August 1953

Primo Carnera was born in Sequals, then in the Province of Udine, now in the Province of Pordenone, Friuli-Venezia Giulia at the north-easternmost corner of Italy.

On 13 March 1939, Carnera married Giuseppina Kovačič (1913–1980), a post office clerk from Gorizia. In 1953, they received dual US and Italian citizenship. They settled in Los Angeles, where Carnera opened a restaurant and a liquor store. They had two children, Umberto and Giovanna Maria. Umberto became a medical doctor. Carnera died in 1967 at age 60 in his native town of Sequals, Italy. He died from a combination of liver disease and complications from diabetes.

== Professional boxing career ==
=== Overview ===
Upon arrival in America, Carnera was first touted as being 7 ft 0 in (2.13 m) tall, and thus the tallest heavyweight in history, but later reporting lists him as low as 6 ft 5 in (1.96 m) tall. He fought at over 275 pounds (125 kg). Often listed as 6 feet 6½ inches to draw comparison to Jess Willard's record breaking height, Carnera was known to be slightly shorter but around 40 lb (18 kg) heavier and was the heaviest champion in boxing history until Nikolai Valuev in 2005.

Primo Carnera silent newsreel 1933

The average height in Italy was approximately 5 ft 5 in (1.65 m) and in the United States 5 ft 7 in (1.70 m), Heavyweights at the time were 175 pounds (79 kg) and up. After Carnera's bout with Ernie Schaaf the New York Boxing Commission considered a proposal that Carnera would only be sanctioned to fight opponents 6 ft 2 in (1.88 m) 220 pounds (100 kg) and up, which would have limited him to 10 known opponents.

=== Early Career / Mob influence and suspicious matches ===
According to boxing historian Herbert Goldman (managing editor of The Ring 1978–1987), Carnera was "very much mob controlled." His contract was purchased by mobster Owney Madden after Carnera's arrival in New York in 1930. Abe Attell was brought in to train Carnera. Attell had been caught up in the Black Sox Scandal. However Attell was acquitted when he successfully convinced the jury that he was the wrong Abe Attell.

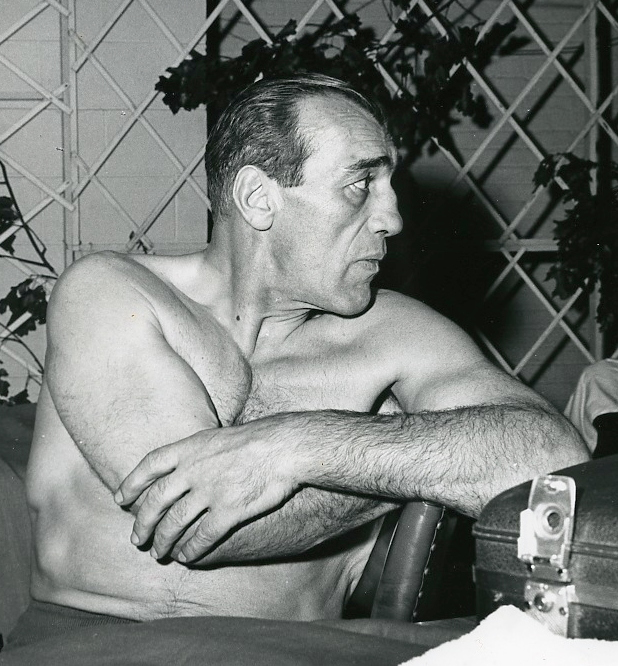
Carnera in 1955

Carnera met his first serious heavyweight contender, Young Stribling, in 1929, and won when Stribling fouled him. In a rematch, he fouled Stribling. Each scored a victory by disqualification. Commenting on the unsatisfactory conclusion of the two matches, sportswriter Robert Edgren commented, "Stribling seems to be playing Carnera the way he has played a lot of palukas and stable mates at different towns in 'the sticks' in this country. Always the return engagement."

Carnera was immediately a draw in the United States. 18,500 saw his American debut against Big Boy Peterson at Madison Square Garden. Carnera won easily in the 1st round. The New York Times noted the absence of betting on the outcome causing scepticism prior to the match. Peterson was counted out while punching himself in the jaw. "Whether to make sure he was knocked out or in an effort to restore his jarred senses could not be ascertained."

A week later in Chicago against Elzear Rioux the fight lasted only 47 seconds and Rioux was down 6 times. Bob Soderman of the Chicago Tribune reported, "Rioux didn't do much fighting... being too intent on doing what he had been hired to do; that is, making sure he fell to the canvas at the slightest provocation." After an investigation, the Illinois Boxing Commission cleared Carnera but fined Rioux $1,000 (~$20,000 in 2025) and revoked his license.

In March 1930, Primo Carnera faced George Trafton, an active player for the Chicago Bears. Trafton was knocked out by Carnera in the first round of their fight. In the aftermath of the fight, the Missouri Boxing Commission suspended Trafton but laid no blame on Carnera.

His April 1930 fight against California club fighter Bombo Chevalier ended when one of Chevalier's seconds, Bob Perry, threw in the towel, although it appeared that Chevalier was in no worse condition than Carnera. The match was found to be fixed, Carnera's purse was initially withheld. Chevalier's manager stated "the towel should not have been thrown in." In an investigation, Chevalier said he had been approached earlier about a "fake fight," but had declined. No one had expected the towel to be thrown in. Chevalier also stated that Perry had rubbed him with a sponge that caused his eyes and nose to burn.

In May 1930 the National Boxing Association, which represented 13 states of the US, suspended Carnera. This banned Carnera from the biggest boxing venues in New York and New Jersey at least temporarily.

His June 1930 match against George Godfrey in Philadelphia was controversial before it began. Seconds were forbidden from throwing in the towel. Godfrey was disqualified for a low blow in the fifth round when he was clearly getting the better of Carnera. In the aftermath, Godfrey lost his boxing license and half his purse, Carnera was cleared. Chief Justice of the United States Earl Warren, at the time district attorney of Alameda County, California, became suspicious of boxing at the time Primo Carnera fought George Godfrey. There was no law against prize-fight fixing in Oakland at that time, and Earl Warren saw that one was passed.

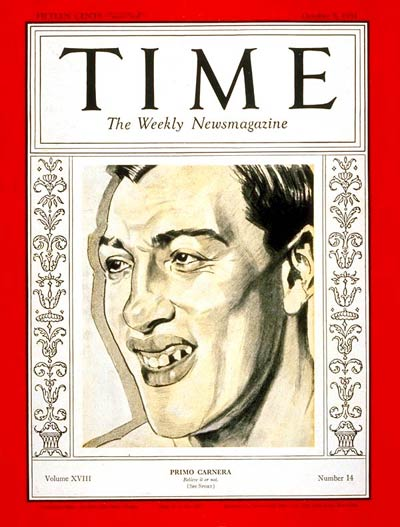
Primo Carnera on the cover of TIME. October 5, 1931.

TIME, in a 5 October 1931 cover story on Carnera before he won the heavyweight title, commented on his odd career:

Since his arrival in the US, backed by a group of prosperous but shady entrepreneurs, Carnera's career has been less glorious than fantastic. His first opponents—Big Boy Peterson, Elzear Rioux, Cowboy Owens—were known to be incompetent but their feeble opposition to Carnera suggested that they had been bribed to lose. Suspicion concerning the Monster's abilities became almost universal when another adversary, Bombo Chevalier, stated that one of his own seconds had threatened to kill him unless he lost to Carnera. Against the huge, lazy, amiable George Godfrey (249 lb), he won on a foul. But only one of 33 US opponents has defeated Monster Carnera—fat, slovenly Jimmy Maloney, whom Sharkey beat five years ago. In a return fight, at Miami last March, Carnera managed to outpoint Maloney.

=== Contender ===
In November 1930 he travelled to Spain and defeated Spanish contender Paulino Uzcudun in front of 75,000-90,000 spectators at Barcelona Olympic Stadium winning by split decision. It was a record boxing crowd in Spain at the time. Carnera came up short in a decision against future heavyweight champion Jack Sharkey before 30,000 fans at Ebbets Field. He followed that with a winning streak that included victories over King Levinsky, Pierre Charles, Don McCorkindale, and Hans Schönrath. He suffered a surprise loss to Larry Gains in front of 70,000 at White City Stadium. It was a record crowd for boxing in Britain at the time.

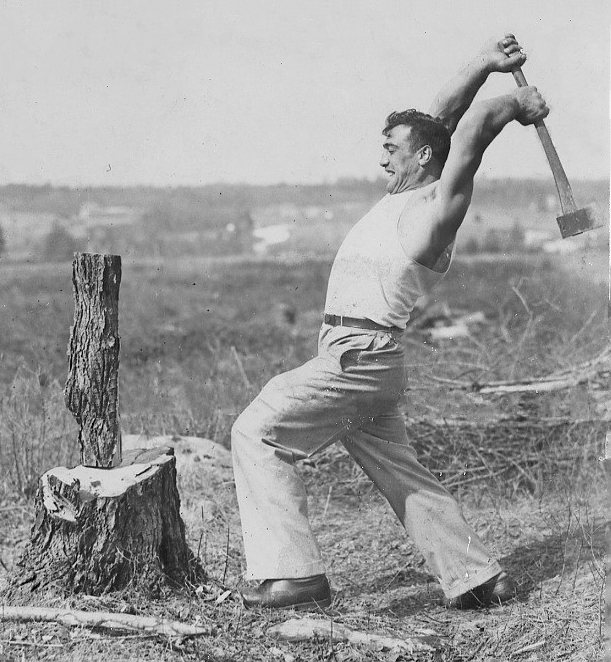
Carnera training c. 1934

In February 1933, Carnera fought contender Ernie Schaaf in a bout that would earn him a heavyweight title shot if he won. Schaaf entered as a slight favourite. The bout was held at Madison Square Garden in New York City.

Primo won by KO in round 13. Schaaf left the ring unconscious and died four days later. An autopsy revealed that Schaaf had meningitis, a swelling of the brain, and was still recovering from a severe case of influenza which had briefly hospitalized him during his training camp.

=== World Heavyweight Champion ===
In June 1933 Carnera faced the now world heavyweight champion Jack Sharkey at the Madison Square Garden Bowl in Queens, New York in front of 40,000. Sharkey had won a decision over Carnera two years before, and this seemed to be a safe title defence. At first it mirrored their first encounter with Sharkey ahead on points early, before Carnera knocked out Sharkey in round six with "a terrific right hand uppercut to the chin that almost decapitated Sharkey and brought Carnera the title."

He successfully defended his title against Paulino Uzcudun in front of 55,000-70,000 spectators in Rome, what was the first heavyweight title fight in Italy. Then he defended against Tommy Loughran in what was the greatest weight disparity between fighters in a championship fight in history at the time, 84 pounds (38 kg).

During his championship reign, he starred opposite his next opponent Max Baer in the Oscar-nominated film The Prizefighter and the Lady (1933). In the film, Baer and Carnera's characters fight for the heavyweight title. The two sparred together during filming (reportedly over a dozen rounds), giving Baer extra time to figure out Carnera's fighting style.

In their 1934 bout Baer wore a Star of David on his trunks, underscoring Carnera’s perceived ties to Fascist Italy. Carnera had performed the fascist salute for his home crowd during his first title defense, which had included Benito Mussolini in attendance. Now he was in his 3rd title defense, back at the familiar Madison Square Garden Bowl, this time in front of 56,000. Carnera was knocked down 3 times in each of the first two rounds, but managed to hang around until in the 11th round when referee Arthur Donovon stopped the fight. He was knocked down 11 times in total, and fractured his right ankle in the defeat.

A statue of the defeated Carnera won the Prix de Rome First Prize in 1934, "L'Athlète Vaincu," by Albert Bouquillon.

=== After championship ===
After a successful South American tour that took him to Brazil, Argentina, and Uruguay, Primo was ready for his next big test, a young Joe Louis. In 1935 Mussolini's Italy was preparing to invade Ethiopia, the last and only independent nation in Africa still ruled by native Africans. Newspapers hyped the political tensions. Joe Louis said, "they put a heavy weight on my twenty year old shoulders. Now, not only did I have to beat the man, but I had to beat him for a cause." At Yankee Stadium in front of 60,000 Louis won by KO in round six. Maya Angelou writes about this fight in I Know Why the Caged Bird Sings.

Two defeats in 1936 by Leroy Haynes left Primo in the hospital for three weeks with temporary paralysis in his left leg, caused by thrombosis, a sprained back, and a damaged kidney. In 1937 Carnera, now a diabetic, had to have the kidney removed, which forced him into retirement. After eight years of retirement he briefly returned to boxing in 1945 with three losses against Luigi Musina. Carnera's record was 88 wins and 14 losses.

=== Legacy in boxing ===
A later World (Middleweight) Champion Nino Benvenuti, said "When I was a kid Primo was a legend for me. I saw him as the unbeatable giant in the fairy tales... they used to say he wasn't skillful. That's false. He had one of the best jabs I've ever seen for a boxer of that size."

Carnera was the third European to hold the world heavyweight championship after Bob Fitzsimmons and Max Schmeling. He would be the last until Ingemar Johansson claimed the title against Floyd Patterson in 1959, over a quarter of a century later.

Carnera was also the first boxer to win the European Heavyweight title and subsequently become World Heavyweight champion.

Carnera's 1933 title defence against Tommy Loughran held the record for the greatest weight differential between two combatants in a world title fight (86 lb or 39 kg) for 73 years until the reign of Nikolai Valuev, who owns the current record for the 105 1/2 lb (47.9 kg) weight advantage he held in his 2006 defence against Monte Barrett.

Valuev also broke Carnera's record of 270 lb (120 kg) to become the heaviest world champion in history, weighing as high as 328 lb (149 kg) during his reign. Carnera still ranks as the fourth-heaviest, behind Valuev, Tyson Fury and Andy Ruiz Jr., over 90 years after he held the title.

Carnera's 1933 title defence against Paulino Uzcudun in Italy was the first heavyweight title fight to be held in Europe since Jack Johnson's title defence against Frank Moran in Paris in 1913. It would be the last such occasion until Muhammad Ali defended the title against Henry Cooper in London in 1966. Carnera-Uzcudun was the first World Heavyweight championship fight to be contested between two Europeans. It was another 60 years before this occurred again, when Lennox Lewis defended the WBC heavyweight title against fellow-Englishman Frank Bruno in 1993, .

== Professional wrestling career ==
In 1946, he became a professional wrestler and was immediately a huge success at the box office. For several years he was one of the top draws in wrestling. Carnera continued to be an attraction into the 1960s. Max Baer attended at least one of Carnera's wrestling matches.

Carnera won his debut against Jules Strongbow in Wilmington, California on 20 August 1946. Two days later, he defeated Tommy O'Toole at the Grand Olympic Auditorium before 10,000 fans. On 23 October 1946, Carnera won his 41st consecutive wrestling match by defeating Jules Strongbow. On 19 November 1946, Carnera beat Harry Kruskamp to remain undefeated at 65–0–0. Primo Carnera went 120 straight wrestling matches undefeated (119–0–1) before suffering his first loss to Yvon Robert in Montreal, Quebec, Canada, on 20 August 1947. Carnera's greatest victory took place on 7 December 1947 when he defeated former world heavyweight champion Ed "Strangler" Lewis.

In May 1948, Carnera took a 143–1–1 record against world heavyweight champion Lou Thesz. Thesz defeated Carnera in a world title defence.

In 1956, he won the WWA Tag Team titles with Bobo Brazil.

He retired from wrestling in 1962.

In 2019, he was inducted into the WWE Hall of Fame Class of 2019.

== Acting career ==
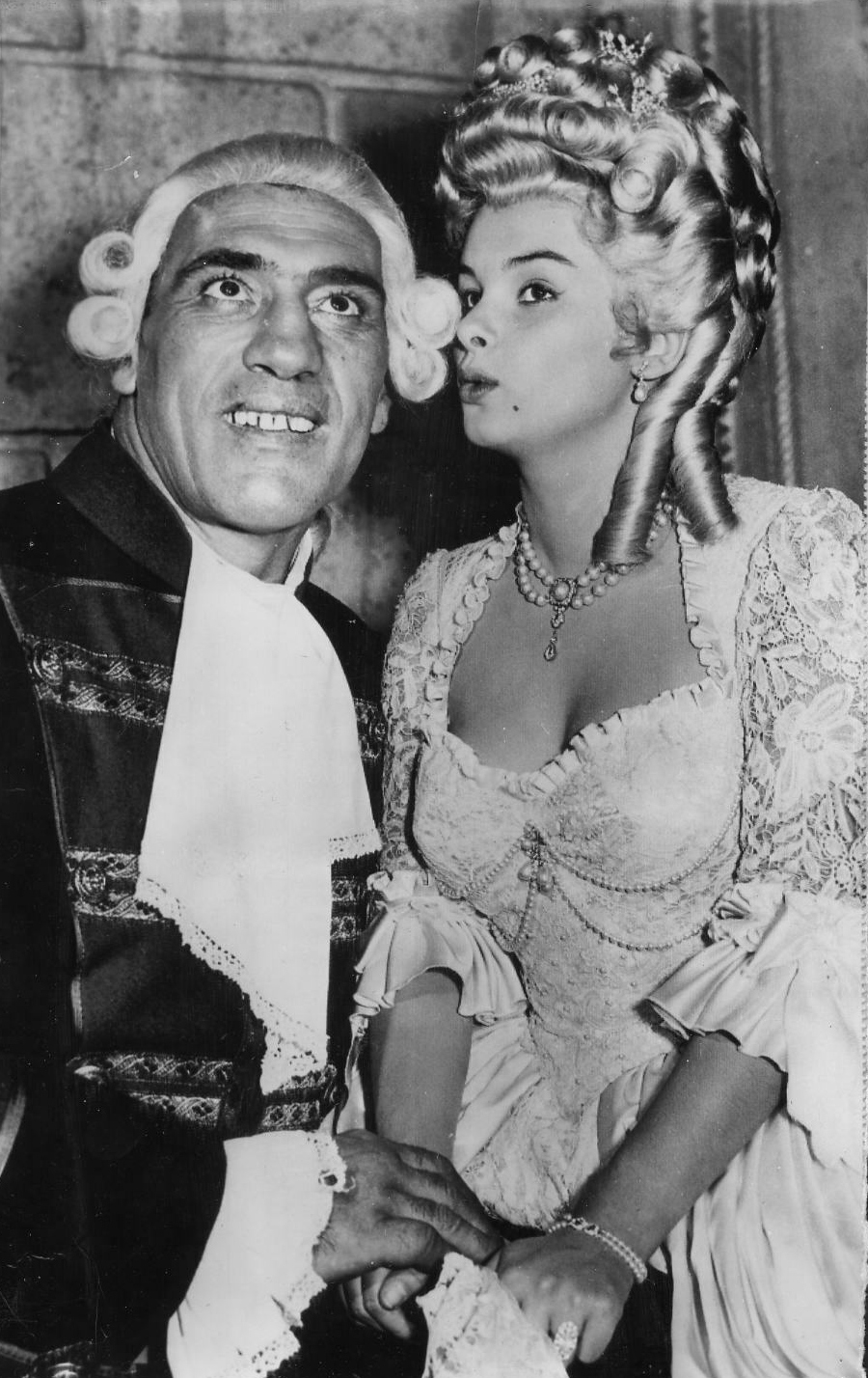
Carnera and Audrey Dalton in Casanova's Big Night (1954)

During his tenure as world champion he played a fictional version of himself in the 1933 film The Prizefighter and the Lady starring Myrna Loy featuring fellow boxers Max Baer and Jack Dempsey. He plays the heavyweight champion in a title fight with Baer.

Carnera had a bit part in the 1949 movie Mighty Joe Young. He played himself in the tug-of-war scene with the giant gorilla.

He also played a bully boy wrestler in Carol Reed's A Kid for Two Farthings (1955). Set in London's Petticoat Lane Market, the film pits Carnera's character against a local bodybuilder who is to marry another character named Sonia, played by Diana Dors.

Primo appeared in at least ten Italian films between 1939 and 1943, as well as several in the 1950s, like Prince Valiant, in the role of Sligon. His last screen role was as the giant Antaeus alongside Steve Reeves in Hercules Unchained (US title, filmed in Italy, 1959, original title Ercole e la regina di Lidia).

== Depictions in popular culture ==
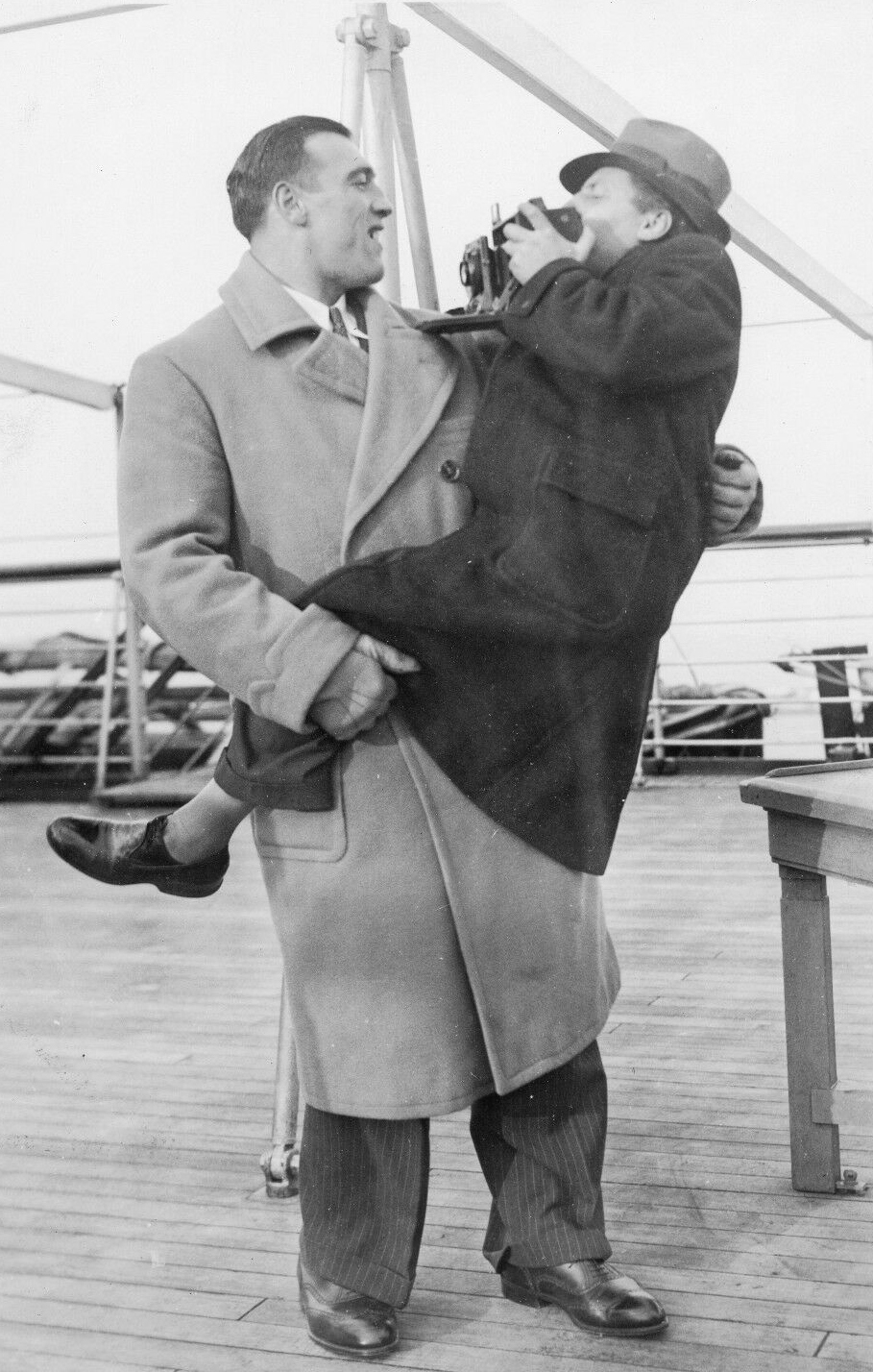
Carnera holding a reporter for a close-up shot in 1933

=== In film ===
Requiem for a Heavyweight, Rod Serling's 1956 Emmy Award-winning teleplay for Playhouse 90 directed by Ralph Nelson (who also won an Emmy), focused on down-and-out former heavyweight boxer Harlan "Mountain" McClintock. The travails of McClintock, who was played by Jack Palance (Sean Connery played the part on British television and Anthony Quinn essayed the role in the 1962 film), was thought by many boxing fans to resemble Carnera's life.

In 1947, fighting aficionado Budd Schulberg wrote The Harder They Fall, a novel about a giant boxer whose fights are all fixed. It was adapted into Mark Robson's 1956 film, which starred Humphrey Bogart and Rod Steiger. The towel throwing controversy against Bombo Chevalier is briefly depicted. A highlight was the appearance of Max Baer, playing a fighter the mob could not fix who destroys the giant in his first fair fight. Critics drew parallels with the real-life Baer-Carnera fight two decades before. In response, Carnera unsuccessfully sued the film's company.

Carnera played himself in the 1949 movie Mighty Joe Young.

Carnera was played by Matthew G. Taylor in the 2005 film Cinderella Man, a film about the life of fellow boxer James J. Braddock.

In 2008, the actor Andrea Iaia played Carnera in the Italian biographical film Carnera: The Walking Mountain, directed by Renzo Martinelli.

In 2013, Emporio Elaborazioni Meccaniche named a motorbike, the 1983 BMW R80RT Carnera, in honor of Carnera.

=== In comics ===
In 1947, Carnera, an Italian comic book series sporting a fictional version of Primo Carnera, was produced. In 1953, it was translated into German. A facsimile version was published in 2010.

Another popular Italian comic character, Dick Fulmine, was graphically inspired by Carnera.

=== In literature ===
Carnera is mentioned by Dove Linkhorn in the 1956 novel Walk on the Wild Side, by Nelson Algren on p. 111.

Carnera is mentioned by Bertie Wooster in the 1934 novel Right Ho, Jeeves, by P.G. Wodehouse on p. 234.

In his 1933 collection of short stories Mulliner Nights, Wodehouse described one character as follows: "He was built on large lines, and seemed to fill the room to overflowing. In physique he was not unlike what Primo Carnera would have been if Carnera hadn't stunted his growth by smoking cigarettes when a boy."

Carrera's fight with Walter Neusel is described in One-storied America by Soviet authors Ilf and Petrov (1937).

Carnera is mentioned by Julian “Digger” Burroughs in the 1982 novel Lucifer’s Weekend, by Warren Murphy on p. 81.

Carnera is mentioned in the 1937 novel, The Far Distant Oxus, by Katharine Hull and Pamela Whitlock, during Bridget's dream where their servant was a cross between 'their waterboy out east and Carnera' on p. 274.

Carnera is mentioned in the 1939 pulp fiction story series Avenger #1 Justice Inc, by Kenneth Robeson on page 59, as an example of a "giant" as the author attempts to describe the physical stature of Algernon Smith - one of Richard Benjamin's future crime fighting allies.

=== In music ===
Carnera is mentioned in Cambalache, a 1934 tango song by Enrique Santos Discépolo that was featured in the musical drama film The Soul of the Accordion.

The Yeasayer song Ambling Alp, from their 2010 album Odd Blood references Carnera by his nickname in the title and second verse. Both Carnera and German boxer Max Schmeling are referenced for their bouts with American Joe Louis.

=== In wrestling ===
Wrestler Big Guido used the names Primo Carnera, Primo Carnera III, Primo Carnera Jr., Primo Carnero in some of his bouts. He stands at 6'9". .

== Professional boxing record ==
All information in this section is derived from BoxRec, unless otherwise stated.

=== Official record ===
102 fights	87 wins	14 losses
By knockout	71	5
By decision	14	7
By disqualification	2	2
Newspaper decisions/draws	1	

All newspaper decisions are officially regarded as “no decision” bouts and are not counted in the win/loss/draw column.

No.	Result	Record	Opponent	Type	Round, time	Date	Location	Notes
103	Loss	88–14 (1)	Luigi Musina	UD	10	19 May 1946	Gorizia, Italy	
102	Loss	88–13 (1)	Luigi Musina	PTS	8	19 Mar 1946	Trieste, Italy	
101	Loss	88–12 (1)	Luigi Musina	TKO	7 (8)	21 Nov 1945	Milan, Italy	
100	Win	88–11 (1)	Sam Gardner	KO	1 (4)	25 Sep 1945	San Sabba Stadium, Trieste, Italy	
99	Win	87–11 (1)	Michel Blevens	KO	3 (4)	22 Jul 1945	Moretti Stadium, Udine, Italy	
98	Win	86–11 (1)	Josip Zupan	KO	2 (10)	4 Dec 1937	Budapest Zirkus, Budapest, Hungary	
97	Loss	85–11 (1)	Albert Di Meglio	PTS	10	18 Nov 1937	Salle Wagram, Paris, France	
96	Loss	85–10 (1)	Leroy Haynes	TKO	9 (10), 0:40	27 May 1936	Ebbets Field, Brooklyn, New York, U.S.	
95	Loss	85–9 (1)	Leroy Haynes	TKO	3 (10), 0:53	16 Mar 1936	Philadelphia Arena, Philadelphia, Pennsylvania, U.S.	
94	Win	85–8 (1)	Isidoro Gastanaga	TKO	5 (10)	6 Mar 1936	Madison Square Garden, New York City, New York, U.S.	
93	Win	84–8 (1)	Big Boy Brackey	TKO	4 (10), 1:06	9 Dec 1935	Broadway Auditorium, Buffalo, New York, U.S.	
92	Win	83–8 (1)	Ford Smith	UD	10	25 Nov 1935	Philadelphia Arena, Philadelphia, Pennsylvania, U.S.	
91	Win	82–8 (1)	Walter Neusel	TKO	4 (10), 2:23	1 Nov 1935	Madison Square Garden, New York City, New York, U.S.	
90	Loss	81–8 (1)	Joe Louis	TKO	6 (15), 2:32	25 Jun 1935	Yankee Stadium, Bronx, New York, U.S.	
89	Win	81–7 (1)	Ray Impelletiere	TKO	9 (10), 0:38	15 Mar 1935	Madison Square Garden, New York City, New York, U.S.	
88	Win	80–7 (1)	Erwin Klausner	KO	6 (12)	22 Jan 1935	Estádio das Laranjeiras, Rio de Janeiro, Brazil	
87	Win	79–7 (1)	Seal Harris	KO	7 (10)	13 Jan 1935	Estádio da Floresta, São Paulo, Brazil	
86	Win	78–7 (1)	Victorio Campolo	PTS	12	1 Dec 1934	Club Atletico Independiente, Buenos Aires, Argentina	
85	Loss	77–7 (1)	Max Baer	TKO	11 (15), 2:16	14 Jun 1934	Madison Square Garden Bowl, Queens, New York, U.S.	Lost NYSAC, NBA, and The Ring heavyweight titles
84	Win	77–6 (1)	Tommy Loughran	UD	15	1 Mar 1934	Madison Square Garden Stadium, Miami, Florida, U.S.	Retained NYSAC, NBA, and The Ring heavyweight titles
83	Win	76–6 (1)	Paulino Uzcudun	UD	15	22 Oct 1933	Piazza di Siena, Rome, Italy	Retained The Ring heavyweight title; Won inaugural IBU world heavyweight title; Won IBU European heavyweight title
82	Win	75–6 (1)	Jack Sharkey	KO	6 (15), 2:27	29 Jun 1933	Madison Square Garden Bowl, Queens, New York, U.S.	Won NYSAC, NBA, and The Ring heavyweight titles
81	Win	74–6 (1)	Ernie Schaaf	KO	13 (15), 0:51	10 Feb 1933	Madison Square Garden, New York City, New York, U.S.	Schaaf died from injuries sustained in the fight.
80	Win	73–6 (1)	Young Spence	KO	1 (10)	30 Dec 1932	Fair Park Arena, Dallas, Texas, U.S.	
79	Win	72–6 (1)	James Merriott	KO	1 (10)	20 Dec 1932	City Auditorium, Galveston, Texas, U.S.	
78	Win	71–6 (1)	Joe Rice	KO	2 (10)	19 Dec 1932	Northside Coliseum, Fort Worth, Texas, U.S.	
77	Win	70–6 (1)	KO Christner	KO	4 (10)	15 Dec 1932	City Auditorium, Omaha, Nebraska, U.S.	
76	Win	69–6 (1)	Big Boy Peterson	TKO	2 (10)	13 Dec 1932	Grand Rapids, Michigan, U.S.	
75	Win	68–6 (1)	King Levinsky	SD	10	9 Dec 1932	Chicago Stadium, Chicago, Illinois, U.S.	
74	Win	67–6 (1)	John Schwake	KO	7 (10), 2:16	2 Dec 1932	St. Louis Coliseum, St. Louis, Missouri, U.S.	
73	Win	66–6 (1)	José Santa	TKO	6 (10)	18 Nov 1932	Madison Square Garden, New York City, New York, U.S.	
72	Win	65–6 (1)	Les Kennedy	KO	3 (10)	4 Nov 1932	Boston Arena, Boston, Massachusetts, U.S.	
71	Win	64–6 (1)	Jack Taylor	KO	2 (10), 1:59	17 Oct 1932	Jefferson County Armory, Louisville, Kentucky, U.S.	
70	Win	63–6 (1)	Gene Stanton	KO	6 (10)	13 Oct 1932	114th Infantry Armory, Camden, New Jersey, U.S.	
69	Win	62–6 (1)	Ted Sandwina	KO	4 (10)	7 Oct 1932	Benjamin Field Arena, Tampa, Florida, U.S.	
68	Win	61–6 (1)	Art Lasky	NWS	10	1 Sep 1932	St. Paul Auditorium, St. Paul, Minnesota, U.S.	
67	Win	61–6	Jack Gagnon	KO	1 (10), 1:35	19 Aug 1932	Mark's Stadium, North Tiverton, Rhode Island, U.S.	
66	Loss	60–6	Stanley Poreda	PTS	10	16 Aug 1932	Dreamland Park, Newark, New Jersey, U.S.	
65	Win	60–5	Hans Birkie	UD	10	2 Aug 1932	Queensboro Stadium, Long Island City, New York, U.S	
64	Win	59–5	Jerry Pavelec	TKO	5 (10), 0:51	28 Jul 1932	Playgrounds Stadium, West New York, New Jersey, U.S	
63	Win	58–5	Jack Gross	TKO	7 (10), 2:50	20 Jul 1932	Ebbets Field, Brooklyn, New York, U.S.	
62	Loss	57–5	Larry Gains	PTS	10	30 May 1932	White City Stadium, London, England	
61	Win	57–4	Hans Schönrath	TKO	3 (10)	15 May 1932	Stadio San Siro, Milan, Italy	
60	Win	56–4	Maurice Griselle	TKO	10 (10)	30 Apr 1932	Palais des Sports, Paris, France	
59	Win	55–4	Don McCorkindale	PTS	10	7 Apr 1932	Royal Albert Hall, London, England	
58	Win	54–4	George Cook	KO	4 (10)	23 Mar 1932	Royal Albert Hall, London, England	
57	Win	53–4	Pierre Charles	PTS	10	29 Feb 1932	Palais des Sports, Paris, France	
56	Win	52–4	Ernst Gühring	TKO	5 (10)	5 Feb 1932	Berlin Sportpalast, Berlin, Germany	
55	Win	51–4	Moise Bouquillon	TKO	2 (10)	25 Jan 1932	Palais des Sports, Paris, France	
54	Win	50–4	Victorio Campolo	KO	2 (15), 1:27	27 Nov 1931	Madison Square Garden, New York City, New York, U.S.	
53	Win	49–4	King Levinsky	UD	10	19 Nov 1931	Chicago Stadium, Chicago, Illinois, U.S.	
52	Loss	48–4	Jack Sharkey	UD	15	12 Oct 1931	Ebbets Field, Brooklyn, New York, U.S.	For ABA Heavyweight title
51	Win	48–3	Armando De Carolis	KO	2 (10), 1:08	6 Aug 1931	Shellpot Park, Wilmington, Delaware, U.S.	
50	Win	47–3	Roberto Roberti	TKO	3 (10), 2:25	4 Aug 1931	Dreamland Park, Newark, New Jersey, U.S.	
49	Win	46–3	Knute Hansen	KO	1 (10), 2:10	24 Jul 1931	Edgerton Park Arena, Rochester, New York, U.S.	
48	Win	45–3	Bud Gorman	KO	2 (10), 2:35	30 Jun 1931	Arena Gardens, Toronto, Ontario Canada	
47	Win	44–3	Umberto Torriani	KO	2 (10), 0:43	26 Jun 1931	Broadway Auditorium, Buffalo, New York, U.S.	
46	Win	43–3	Pat Redmond	KO	1 (10), 2:24	15 Jun 1931	Ebbets Field, Brooklyn, New York, U.S.	
45	Win	42–3	Jim Maloney	PTS	10	5 Mar 1931	Madison Square Garden Stadium, Miami, Florida, U.S.	
44	Win	41–3	Reggie Meen	TKO	2 (6)	18 Dec 1930	Royal Albert Hall, London, England	
43	Win	40–3	Paulino Uzcudun	SD	10	30 Nov 1930	Estadio Olímpico de Montjuïc, Barcelona, Spain	
42	Loss	39–3	Jim Maloney	PTS	10	7 Oct 1930	Boston Garden, Boston, Massachusetts, U.S.	
41	Win	39–2	Jack Gross	KO	4 (10)	17 Sep 1930	Chicago Stadium, Chicago, Illinois, U.S.	
40	Win	38–2	Pat McCarthy	TKO	2 (10), 1:16	8 Sep 1930	Newark Velodrome, Newark, New Jersey, U.S.	
39	Win	37–2	Riccardo Bertazzolo	TKO	3 (15)	30 Aug 1930	Atlantic City Auditorium, Atlantic City, New Jersey, U.S.	
38	Win	36–2	George Cook	KO	2 (10), 1:44	29 Jul 1930	Taylor Bowl, Cleveland, Ohio, U.S.	
37	Win	35–2	Bearcat Wright	KO	4 (10), 1:13	17 Jul 1930	League Park, Omaha, Nebraska, U.S.	
36	Win	34–2	George Godfrey	DQ	5 (10), 1:13	23 Jun 1930	Shibe Park, Philadelphia, Pennsylvania, U.S.	
35	Win	33–2	KO Christner	KO	4 (10), 1:20	5 Jun 1930	Michigan State Fairgrounds Coliseum, Detroit, Michigan, U.S.	
34	Win	32–2	Sam Baker	KO	1 (10)	22 Apr 1930	Portland Ice Hippodrome, Portland, Oregon, U.S.	
33	Win	31–2	Leon Chevalier	TKO	6 (10)	14 Apr 1930	Oakland Baseball Park, Emeryville, California, U.S.	
32	Win	30–2	Neil Clisby	KO	2 (10), 0:40	8 Apr 1930	Olympic Auditorium, Los Angeles, California, U.S.	
31	Win	29–2	Jack McAuliffe II	KO	1 (10), 2:18	28 Mar 1930	Stockyards Stadium, Denver, Colorado, U.S.	
30	Win	28–2	George Trafton	KO	1 (10), 0:54	26 Mar 1930	Convention Hall, Kansas City, Kansas, U.S.	
29	Win	27–2	Frank Zaveta	KO	1 (10), 1:51	20 Mar 1930	Jacksonville, Florida, U.S.	
28	Win	26–2	Chuck Wiggins	KO	2 (10)	17 Mar 1930	St. Louis Arena, St. Louis, Missouri, U.S.	
27	Win	25–2	Sully Montgomery	KO	2 (10), 1:15	11 Mar 1930	Minneapolis, Minnesota, U.S.	
26	Win	24–2	Roy Clark	KO	6 (10), 2:38	3 Mar 1930	Philadelphia Arena, Philadelphia, Pennsylvania, U.S.	
25	Win	23–2	Farmer Lodge	KO	2 (10), 1:22	24 Feb 1930	Heinemann Park, New Orleans, Louisiana, U.S.	
24	Win	22–2	Johnny Erickson	KO	2 (10), 1:45	17 Feb 1930	Coliseum, Oklahoma City, Oklahoma, U.S.	
23	Win	21–2	Jim Sigman	KO	1 (8), 1:35	14 Feb 1930	Memphis, Tennessee, U.S.	
22	Win	20–2	Buster Martin	KO	2 (10), 0:56	11 Feb 1930	St. Louis Arena, St. Louis, Missouri, U.S.	
21	Win	19–2	Cowboy Billy Owens	KO	2 (10), 2:22	6 Feb 1930	113th Regiment Armory, Newark, New Jersey, U.S.	
20	Win	18–2	Elzear Rioux	KO	1 (10), 0:47	31 Jan 1930	Chicago Stadium, Chicago, Illinois, U.S.	
19	Win	17–2	Big Boy Peterson	KO	1 (10), 1:10	24 Jan 1930	Madison Square Garden, New York City, New York, U.S.	
18	Win	16–2	Franz Diener	TKO	6 (15)	17 Dec 1929	Royal Albert Hall, London, England	
17	Loss	15–2	Young Stribling	DQ	7 (10)	7 Dec 1929	Vélodrome d'Hiver, Paris, France	
16	Win	15–1	Young Stribling	DQ	4 (15)	18 Nov 1929	Royal Albert Hall, London, England	
15	Win	14–1	Jack Stanley	TKO	1 (8)	17 Oct 1929	Royal Albert Hall, London, England	
14	Win	13–1	Hermann Jaspers	KO	3 (10)	18 Sep 1929	Salle Wagram, Paris, France	
13	Win	12–1	Feodor Nikolaeff	KO	1 (10)	30 Aug 1929	Garage de Normandie, Dieppe, France	
12	Win	11–1	Joe Thomas	TKO	4 (10)	25 Aug 1929	Arènes du Rond-Point du Prado, Marseille, France	
11	Win	10–1	Jose Lete	UD	10	14 Aug 1929	Estadio Municipal de Atocha, San Sebastián, Spain	
10	Win	9–1	Jack Humbeeck	TKO	6 (10)	26 Jun 1929	Salle Wagram, Paris, France	
9	Win	8–1	Marcel Nilles	TKO	3 (10)	30 May 1929	Cirque de Paris, Paris, France	
8	Win	7–1	Moise Bouquillon	PTS	10	22 May 1929	Salle Wagram, Paris, France	
7	Loss	6–1	Franz Diener	DQ	1 (10)	28 Apr 1929	Messehalle, Leipzig, Germany	
6	Win	6–0	Ernst Roesemann	TKO	5 (8)	18 Jan 1929	Berlin Sportpalast, Berlin, Germany	
5	Win	5–0	Constant Barrick	KO	3 (10)	1 Dec 1928	Vélodrome d'Hiver, Paris, France	
4	Win	4–0	Epifanio Islas	UD	10	25 Nov 1928	Palazzo dello Sport, Milan, Italy	
3	Win	3–0	Salvatore Ruggirello	TKO	4 (10)	30 Oct 1928	Cirque de Paris, Paris, France	
2	Win	2–0	Joe Thomas	KO	3 (10)	25 Sep 1928	Cirque de Paris, Paris, France	
1	Win	1–0	Leon Sebilo	TKO	2 (10)	12 Sep 1928	Salle Wagram, Paris, France	

=== Unofficial record ===
102 fights	88 wins	14 losses
By knockout	71	5
By decision	15	7
By disqualification	2	2

Record with the inclusion of newspaper decisions in the win/loss/draw column.

No.	Result	Record	Opponent	Type	Round, time	Date	Location	Notes
103	Loss	89–14	Luigi Musina	UD	10	19 May 1946	Gorizia, Italy	
102	Loss	89–13	Luigi Musina	PTS	8	19 Mar 1946	Trieste, Italy	
101	Loss	89–12	Luigi Musina	TKO	7 (8)	21 Nov 1945	Milan, Italy	
100	Win	89–11	Sam Gardner	KO	1 (4)	25 Sep 1945	San Sabba Stadium, Trieste, Italy	
99	Win	88–11	Michel Blevens	KO	3 (4)	22 Jul 1945	Moretti Stadium, Udine, Italy	
98	Win	87–11	Josip Zupan	KO	2 (10)	4 Dec 1937	Budapest Zirkus, Budapest, Hungary	
97	Loss	86–11	Albert Di Meglio	PTS	10	18 Nov 1937	Salle Wagram, Paris, France	
96	Loss	86–10	Leroy Haynes	TKO	9 (10), 0:40	27 May 1936	Ebbets Field, Brooklyn, New York, U.S.	
95	Loss	86–9	Leroy Haynes	TKO	3 (10), 0:53	16 Mar 1936	Philadelphia Arena, Philadelphia, Pennsylvania, U.S.	
94	Win	86–8	Isidoro Gastanaga	TKO	5 (10)	6 Mar 1936	Madison Square Garden, New York City, New York, U.S.	
93	Win	85–8	Big Boy Brackey	TKO	4 (10), 1:06	9 Dec 1935	Broadway Auditorium, Buffalo, New York, U.S.	
92	Win	84–8	Ford Smith	UD	10	25 Nov 1935	Philadelphia Arena, Philadelphia, Pennsylvania, U.S.	
91	Win	83–8	Walter Neusel	TKO	4 (10), 2:23	1 Nov 1935	Madison Square Garden, New York City, New York, U.S.	
90	Loss	82–8	Joe Louis	TKO	6 (15), 2:32	25 Jun 1935	Yankee Stadium, Bronx, New York, U.S.	
89	Win	82–7	Ray Impelletiere	TKO	9 (10), 0:38	15 Mar 1935	Madison Square Garden, New York City, New York, U.S.	
88	Win	81–7	Erwin Klausner	KO	6 (12)	22 Jan 1935	Estádio das Laranjeiras, Rio de Janeiro, Brazil	
87	Win	80–7	Seal Harris	KO	7 (10)	13 Jan 1935	Estádio da Floresta, São Paulo, Brazil	
86	Win	79–7	Victorio Campolo	PTS	12	1 Dec 1934	Club Atletico Independiente, Buenos Aires, Argentina	
85	Loss	78–7	Max Baer	TKO	11 (15), 2:16	14 Jun 1934	Madison Square Garden Bowl, Queens, New York, U.S.	Lost NYSAC, NBA, and The Ring heavyweight titles
84	Win	78–6	Tommy Loughran	UD	15	1 Mar 1934	Madison Square Garden Stadium, Miami, Florida, U.S.	Retained NYSAC, NBA, and The Ring heavyweight titles
83	Win	77–6	Paulino Uzcudun	UD	15	22 Oct 1933	Piazza di Siena, Rome, Italy	Retained The Ring heavyweight title; Won inaugural IBU world heavyweight title; Won IBU European heavyweight title
82	Win	76–6	Jack Sharkey	KO	6 (15), 2:27	29 Jun 1933	Madison Square Garden Bowl, Queens, New York, U.S.	Won NYSAC, NBA, and The Ring heavyweight titles
81	Win	75–6	Ernie Schaaf	KO	13 (15), 0:51	10 Feb 1933	Madison Square Garden, New York City, New York, U.S.	Schaaf died from injuries sustained in the fight.
80	Win	74–6	Young Spence	KO	1 (10)	30 Dec 1932	Fair Park Arena, Dallas, Texas, U.S.	
79	Win	73–6	James Merriott	KO	1 (10)	20 Dec 1932	City Auditorium, Galveston, Texas, U.S.	
78	Win	72–6	Joe Rice	KO	2 (10)	19 Dec 1932	Northside Coliseum, Fort Worth, Texas, U.S.	
77	Win	71–6	KO Christner	KO	4 (10)	15 Dec 1932	City Auditorium, Omaha, Nebraska, U.S.	
76	Win	70–6	Big Boy Peterson	TKO	2 (10)	13 Dec 1932	Grand Rapids, Michigan, U.S.	
75	Win	69–6	King Levinsky	SD	10	9 Dec 1932	Chicago Stadium, Chicago, Illinois, U.S.	
74	Win	68–6	John Schwake	KO	7 (10), 2:16	2 Dec 1932	St. Louis Coliseum, St. Louis, Missouri, U.S.	
73	Win	67–6	José Santa	TKO	6 (10)	18 Nov 1932	Madison Square Garden, New York City, New York, U.S.	
72	Win	66–6	Les Kennedy	KO	3 (10)	4 Nov 1932	Boston Arena, Boston, Massachusetts, U.S.	
71	Win	65–6	Jack Taylor	KO	2 (10), 1:59	17 Oct 1932	Jefferson County Armory, Louisville, Kentucky, U.S.	
70	Win	64–6	Gene Stanton	KO	6 (10)	13 Oct 1932	114th Infantry Armory, Camden, New Jersey, U.S.	
69	Win	63–6	Ted Sandwina	KO	4 (10)	7 Oct 1932	Benjamin Field Arena, Tampa, Florida, U.S.	
68	Win	62–6	Art Lasky	NWS	10	1 Sep 1932	St. Paul Auditorium, St. Paul, Minnesota, U.S.	
67	Win	61–6	Jack Gagnon	KO	1 (10), 1:35	19 Aug 1932	Mark's Stadium, North Tiverton, Rhode Island, U.S.	
66	Loss	60–6	Stanley Poreda	PTS	10	16 Aug 1932	Dreamland Park, Newark, New Jersey, U.S.	
65	Win	60–5	Hans Birkie	UD	10	2 Aug 1932	Queensboro Stadium, Long Island City, New York, U.S	
64	Win	59–5	Jerry Pavelec	TKO	5 (10), 0:51	28 Jul 1932	Playgrounds Stadium, West New York, New Jersey, U.S	
63	Win	58–5	Jack Gross	TKO	7 (10), 2:50	20 Jul 1932	Ebbets Field, Brooklyn, New York, U.S.	
62	Loss	57–5	Larry Gains	PTS	10	30 May 1932	White City Stadium, London, England	
61	Win	57–4	Hans Schönrath	TKO	3 (10)	15 May 1932	Stadio San Siro, Milan, Italy	
60	Win	56–4	Maurice Griselle	TKO	10 (10)	30 Apr 1932	Palais des Sports, Paris, France	
59	Win	55–4	Don McCorkindale	PTS	10	7 Apr 1932	Royal Albert Hall, London, England	
58	Win	54–4	George Cook	KO	4 (10)	23 Mar 1932	Royal Albert Hall, London, England	
57	Win	53–4	Pierre Charles	PTS	10	29 Feb 1932	Palais des Sports, Paris, France	
56	Win	52–4	Ernst Gühring	TKO	5 (10)	5 Feb 1932	Berlin Sportpalast, Berlin, Germany	
55	Win	51–4	Moise Bouquillon	TKO	2 (10)	25 Jan 1932	Palais des Sports, Paris, France	
54	Win	50–4	Victorio Campolo	KO	2 (15), 1:27	27 Nov 1931	Madison Square Garden, New York City, New York, U.S.	
53	Win	49–4	King Levinsky	UD	10	19 Nov 1931	Chicago Stadium, Chicago, Illinois, U.S.	
52	Loss	48–4	Jack Sharkey	UD	15	12 Oct 1931	Ebbets Field, Brooklyn, New York, U.S.	For ABA heavyweight title
51	Win	48–3	Armando De Carolis	KO	2 (10), 1:08	6 Aug 1931	Shellpot Park, Wilmington, Delaware, U.S.	
50	Win	47–3	Roberto Roberti	TKO	3 (10), 2:25	4 Aug 1931	Dreamland Park, Newark, New Jersey, U.S.	
49	Win	46–3	Knute Hansen	KO	1 (10), 2:10	24 Jul 1931	Edgerton Park Arena, Rochester, New York, U.S.	
48	Win	45–3	Bud Gorman	KO	2 (10), 2:35	30 Jun 1931	Arena Gardens, Toronto, Ontario Canada	
47	Win	44–3	Umberto Torriani	KO	2 (10), 0:43	26 Jun 1931	Broadway Auditorium, Buffalo, New York, U.S.	
46	Win	43–3	Pat Redmond	KO	1 (10), 2:24	15 Jun 1931	Ebbets Field, Brooklyn, New York, U.S.	
45	Win	42–3	Jim Maloney	PTS	10	5 Mar 1931	Madison Square Garden Stadium, Miami, Florida, U.S.	
44	Win	41–3	Reggie Meen	TKO	2 (6)	18 Dec 1930	Royal Albert Hall, London, England	
43	Win	40–3	Paulino Uzcudun	SD	10	30 Nov 1930	Estadio Olímpico de Montjuïc, Barcelona, Spain	
42	Loss	39–3	Jim Maloney	PTS	10	7 Oct 1930	Boston Garden, Boston, Massachusetts, U.S.	
41	Win	39–2	Jack Gross	KO	4 (10)	17 Sep 1930	Chicago Stadium, Chicago, Illinois, U.S.	
40	Win	38–2	Pat McCarthy	TKO	2 (10), 1:16	8 Sep 1930	Newark Velodrome, Newark, New Jersey, U.S.	
39	Win	37–2	Riccardo Bertazzolo	TKO	3 (15)	30 Aug 1930	Atlantic City Auditorium, Atlantic City, New Jersey, U.S.	
38	Win	36–2	George Cook	KO	2 (10), 1:44	29 Jul 1930	Taylor Bowl, Cleveland, Ohio, U.S.	
37	Win	35–2	Bearcat Wright	KO	4 (10), 1:13	17 Jul 1930	League Park, Omaha, Nebraska, U.S.	
36	Win	34–2	George Godfrey	DQ	5 (10), 1:13	23 Jun 1930	Shibe Park, Philadelphia, Pennsylvania, U.S.	
35	Win	33–2	KO Christner	KO	4 (10), 1:20	5 Jun 1930	Michigan State Fairgrounds Coliseum, Detroit, Michigan, U.S.	
34	Win	32–2	Sam Baker	KO	1 (10)	22 Apr 1930	Portland Ice Hippodrome, Portland, Oregon, U.S.	
33	Win	31–2	Leon Chevalier	TKO	6 (10)	14 Apr 1930	Oakland Baseball Park, Emeryville, California, U.S.	
32	Win	30–2	Neil Clisby	KO	2 (10), 0:40	8 Apr 1930	Olympic Auditorium, Los Angeles, California, U.S.	
31	Win	29–2	Jack McAuliffe II	KO	1 (10), 2:18	28 Mar 1930	Stockyards Stadium, Denver, Colorado, U.S.	
30	Win	28–2	George Trafton	KO	1 (10), 0:54	26 Mar 1930	Convention Hall, Kansas City, Kansas, U.S.	
29	Win	27–2	Frank Zaveta	KO	1 (10), 1:51	20 Mar 1930	Jacksonville, Florida, U.S.	
28	Win	26–2	Chuck Wiggins	KO	2 (10)	17 Mar 1930	St. Louis Arena, St. Louis, Missouri, U.S.	
27	Win	25–2	Sully Montgomery	KO	2 (10), 1:15	11 Mar 1930	Minneapolis, Minnesota, U.S.	
26	Win	24–2	Roy Clark	KO	6 (10), 2:38	3 Mar 1930	Philadelphia Arena, Philadelphia, Pennsylvania, U.S.	
25	Win	23–2	Farmer Lodge	KO	2 (10), 1:22	24 Feb 1930	Heinemann Park, New Orleans, Louisiana, U.S.	
24	Win	22–2	Johnny Erickson	KO	2 (10), 1:45	17 Feb 1930	Coliseum, Oklahoma City, Oklahoma, U.S.	
23	Win	21–2	Jim Sigman	KO	1 (8), 1:35	14 Feb 1930	Memphis, Tennessee, U.S.	
22	Win	20–2	Buster Martin	KO	2 (10), 0:56	11 Feb 1930	St. Louis Arena, St. Louis, Missouri, U.S.	
21	Win	19–2	Cowboy Billy Owens	KO	2 (10), 2:22	6 Feb 1930	113th Regiment Armory, Newark, New Jersey, U.S.	
20	Win	18–2	Elzear Rioux	KO	1 (10), 0:47	31 Jan 1930	Chicago Stadium, Chicago, Illinois, U.S.	
19	Win	17–2	Big Boy Peterson	KO	1 (10), 1:10	24 Jan 1930	Madison Square Garden, New York City, New York, U.S.	
18	Win	16–2	Franz Diener	TKO	6 (15)	17 Dec 1929	Royal Albert Hall, London, England	
17	Loss	15–2	Young Stribling	DQ	7 (10)	7 Dec 1929	Vélodrome d'Hiver, Paris, France	
16	Win	15–1	Young Stribling	DQ	4 (15)	18 Nov 1929	Royal Albert Hall, London, England	
15	Win	14–1	Jack Stanley	TKO	1 (8)	17 Oct 1929	Royal Albert Hall, London, England	
14	Win	13–1	Hermann Jaspers	KO	3 (10)	18 Sep 1929	Salle Wagram, Paris, France	
13	Win	12–1	Feodor Nikolaeff	KO	1 (10)	30 Aug 1929	Garage de Normandie, Dieppe, France	
12	Win	11–1	Joe Thomas	TKO	4 (10)	25 Aug 1929	Arènes du Rond-Point du Prado, Marseille, France	
11	Win	10–1	Jose Lete	UD	10	14 Aug 1929	Estadio Municipal de Atocha, San Sebastián, Spain	
10	Win	9–1	Jack Humbeeck	TKO	6 (10)	26 Jun 1929	Salle Wagram, Paris, France	
9	Win	8–1	Marcel Nilles	TKO	3 (10)	30 May 1929	Cirque de Paris, Paris, France	
8	Win	7–1	Moise Bouquillon	PTS	10	22 May 1929	Salle Wagram, Paris, France	
7	Loss	6–1	Franz Diener	DQ	1 (10)	28 Apr 1929	Messehalle, Leipzig, Germany	
6	Win	6–0	Ernst Roesemann	TKO	5 (8)	18 Jan 1929	Berlin Sportpalast, Berlin, Germany	
5	Win	5–0	Constant Barrick	KO	3 (10)	1 Dec 1928	Vélodrome d'Hiver, Paris, France	
4	Win	4–0	Epifanio Islas	UD	10	25 Nov 1928	Palazzo dello Sport, Milan, Italy	
3	Win	3–0	Salvatore Ruggirello	TKO	4 (10)	30 Oct 1928	Cirque de Paris, Paris, France	
2	Win	2–0	Joe Thomas	KO	3 (10)	25 Sep 1928	Cirque de Paris, Paris, France	
1	Win	1–0	Leon Sebilo	TKO	2 (10)	12 Sep 1928	Salle Wagram, Paris, France	

== Championships and accomplishments ==
=== Boxing ===
- International Boxing Union
  - IBU Heavyweight Championship (22 October 1933 – 21 June 1935; vacated)
- National Boxing Association
  - NBA World Heavyweight Championship (29 June 1933 – 14 June 1934)
- New York State Athletic Commission
  - NYSAC World Heavyweight Championship (29 June 1933 – 14 June 1934)
- The Ring magazine
  - The Ring Heavyweight Champion (29 June 1933 – 14 June 1934)
- Undisputed Heavyweight Champion (29 June 1933 – 14 June 1934)

=== Professional wrestling ===
- NWA Hollywood Wrestling
  - NWA International Television Tag Team Championship (1 time) – with Bobo Brazil
- NWA San Francisco
  - NWA World Tag Team Championship (San Francisco version) (1 time) – with Sandor Szabo
- WWE
  - WWE Hall of Fame (Class of 2019)

== See also ==
- Walk of Fame of Italian sport
- List of heavyweight boxing champions

== Bibliography ==
- Page, Joseph S. (2010). Primo Carnera: The Life and Career of the Heavyweight Boxing Champion. Jefferson, North Carolina: McFarland & Company. ISBN 978-0-7864-4810-4.

Sporting positions
World boxing titles
Preceded by Jack Sharkey	NYSAC heavyweight champion June 29, 1933 – June 14, 1934	Succeeded by Max Baer
Preceded by Jack Sharkey	NBA heavyweight champion June 29, 1933 – June 14, 1934	Succeeded by Max Baer
Preceded by Jack Sharkey	The Ring heavyweight champion June 29, 1933 – June 14, 1934	Succeeded by Max Baer
Preceded by Jack Sharkey	Undisputed heavyweight champion June 29, 1933 – June 14, 1934	Succeeded by Max Baer
