= Antonio De La Fuente =

American boxer

Personal information
- Nickname: Tony Fuente "Kid Shine"
- Born: Antonio De La Fuente; August 24, 1902 Prescott, Arizona
- Died: January 1970 (aged 67)
- Height: 6 ft 3 in (192 cm)
- Weight: Heavyweight

Boxing career
- Reach: 79 in (201 cm)
- Stance: Orthodox

Boxing record
- Total fights: 116
- Wins: 73
- Win by KO: 44
- Losses: 33
- Draws: 10
- No contests: 0

Antonio De La Fuente (August 24, 1902 – 3 January 1970) was an American professional boxer in the Heavyweight division. He was born in Prescott, Arizona into a Mexican American family.

== Professional career ==
In August 1932 De La Fuente upset the undefeated Red Fields via decision over sixth rounds. The bout was held in Des Moines, Iowa.
