= The Prizefighter and the Lady =

1933 film by Howard Hawks, W. S. Van Dyke

- Film poster
- Directed by: W. S. Van Dyke; Howard Hawks (uncredited)
- Written by: Frances Marion (story); John Lee Mahin; John Meehan
- Produced by: W. S. Van Dyke; Hunt Stromberg
- Starring: Myrna Loy; Max Baer; Primo Carnera; Jack Dempsey
- Cinematography: Lester White
- Edited by: Robert Kern
- Music by: Frank Skinner; Paul Marquardt
- Distributed by: MGM
- Release date: November 10, 1933
- Running time: 102 minutes
- Country: United States
- Language: English
- Budget: $682,000
- Box office: $933,000

The Prizefighter and the Lady is a 1933 pre-Code Metro-Goldwyn-Mayer romance film directed by Howard Hawks and W. S. Van Dyke starring Myrna Loy and the professional boxers Max Baer, Primo Carnera, and Jack Dempsey. The film was adapted for the screen by John Lee Mahin and John Meehan from a story by Frances Marion. Marion was nominated for an Academy Award for Best Writing, Original Story.

== Plot ==
While working as a barroom bouncer, sailor Steve Morgan impresses alcoholic ex-boxing manager "the Professor" with his skills. The Professor talks Steve into entering a prize fight with an up-and-coming boxer to make money for both of them.

While out training on the road, Steve is nearly run over by a speeding car that crashes into a ditch. He carries nightclub singer Belle Mercer out of the wreckage. Though she is attracted to him, she refuses to have anything to do with Steve. He learns where she lives and goes to see her anyway. He is too cocky to be concerned when she reveals that she is the girlfriend of well-known gangster Willie Ryan. When Willie finds out, Belle reassures him she is in control of her emotions. Willie is not so certain about that, but is too shrewd to have Steve killed out of hand by his bodyguard, whom he jokingly calls his "Adopted Son". It turns out that he had cause for concern; Steve persuades Belle to marry him. Deeply in love with Belle himself and still hoping to get her back, Willie lets Steve live.

Steve quickly rises through the boxing ranks. However, he cannot keep from fooling around with other women. When Belle catches him in a lie, she tells him that she loves him, but if he cheats on her once more, she will leave him. While waiting for a bout for the heavyweight championship of the world, Steve performs in a musical revue. When Belle unexpectedly goes to his dressing room, she finds a woman hiding there. It is the end of their marriage. She gets her old job back with Willie.

Anxious to see the overconfident Steve humiliated, Willie finds out what is holding up the match with the current champion, Primo Carnera (playing himself), and pays $25,000 to set it up. When the Professor tries to get Steve to train properly (without women and liquor), Steve gets angry and slaps him, ending their partnership.

The championship bout is refereed by boxing promoter and former champion Jack Dempsey (himself). Belle, Willie and the Professor are all in attendance. For most of the ten-round fight, Steve gets pummeled by the much heavier Carnera. Finally, a distraught Belle urges the Professor to forget his wounded pride and go to Steve's corner to provide much needed advice. With his old friend and his ex-wife rooting him on, a heartened Steve makes a furious comeback in the final rounds. The match ends in a draw; Carnera retains his title.

Later, Willie enters Belle's nightclub dressing room and tells her she is fired. Then he brings Steve in and leaves the couple alone to reconcile.

== Cast ==
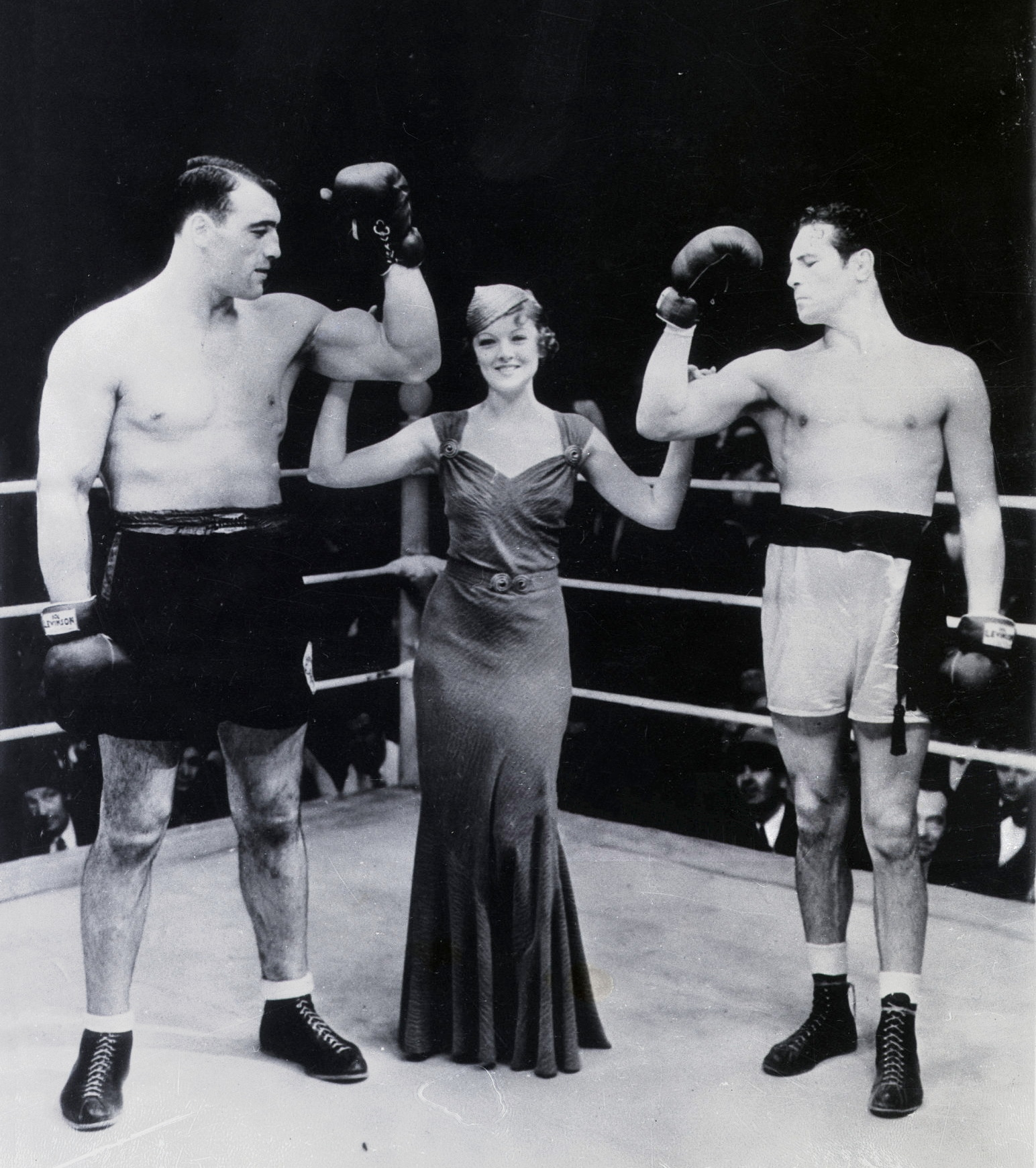
Carnera, Loy and Baer in the film

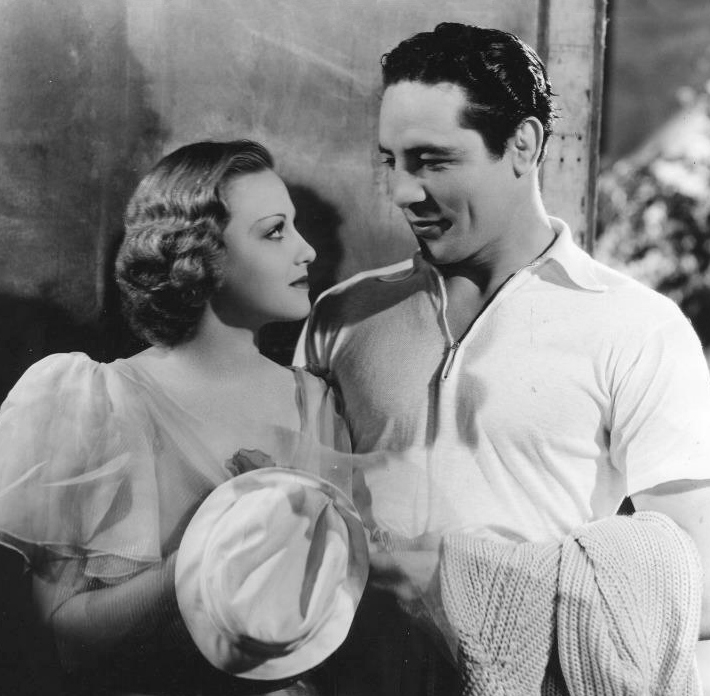
Jean Howard and Baer in the film

- Myrna Loy as Belle
- Max Baer as Steve
- Primo Carnera as Carnera
- Jack Dempsey as Promoter
- Walter Huston as Professor
- Otto Kruger as Willie Ryan
- Vince Barnett as Bugsie
- Robert McWade as Adopted Son
- Muriel Evans as Linda
- Jean Howard as Show Girl
- Garry Owen as Jake - Fight Promoter
- Matty Roubert as Newsboy
- Several boxing and wrestling stars, including former champions Jess Willard and James J. Jeffries, have cameos as themselves when they are introduced in the ring before the climactic fight.

This movie was the film debut for Baer and Carnera. Dempsey, on the other hand, had already appeared in a number of films, dating back to 1920s Daredevil Jack.

The Three Stooges are reported to have been in a deleted scene.

== Production ==
Howard Hawks was the initial director, but left the set when he found he would be working with non-actor Baer, not Clark Gable. MGM replaced Hawks with W. S. Van Dyke.

== Reception ==
On March 16, 1934, The Prizefighter and the Lady premiered at the Capitol Theater in Berlin. However, when permission was sought to show a German-dubbed version, Nazi Minister of Propaganda Joseph Goebbels had the film banned in Germany because, as one of his underlings stated, "the chief character is a Jewish boxer" (Baer's grandfather was Jewish). Baer contended, however, that "They didn't ban the picture because I have Jewish blood. They banned it because I knocked out Max Schmeling" on June 8, 1933.

The film grossed a total (domestic and foreign) of $933,000: $432,000 from the US and Canada and $501,000 elsewhere resulting in a loss of $105,000.

== Boxing ==
Carnera was the world heavyweight boxing champion at the time of the film's release. The script originally had Baer's character knocking out Carnera's character. Unhappy with that ending, Carnera's handlers negotiated a script change and an extra $25,000 to change the fight to a draw. Baer then defeated Carnera in their real-life June 14, 1934, fight, knocking him down a record 11 times. The two sparred together during filming (reportedly over a dozen rounds), and this extra familiarity with Carnera may have helped give Baer extra time to figure out Carnera's fighting style.

== Home media ==
This film was released on DVD on June 27, 2011 by the Warner Archive Collection.

== See also ==
- List of boxing films
