= Mike Jacobs (boxing) =

American boxing promoter (1880–1953)

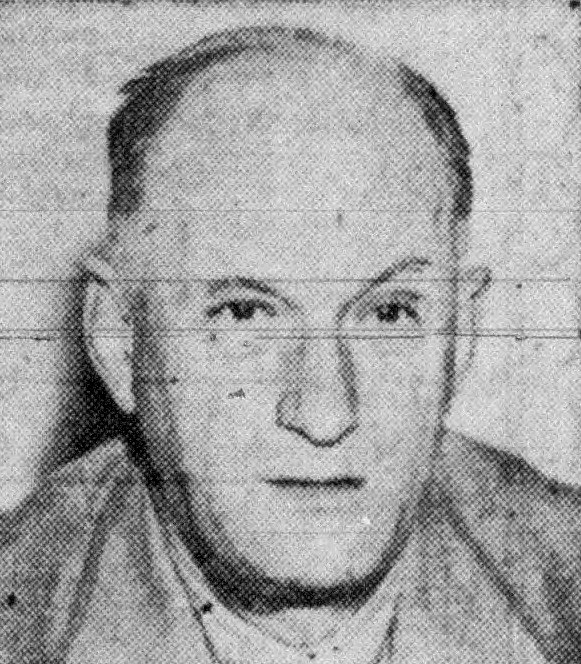
Jacobs, circa 1942 ringside at the Henry Armstrong/Barney Ross bout at the Madison Square Garden Bowl, Long Island City, Queens, New York on May 31, 1938

Michael Strauss Jacobs (March 17, 1880 – January 1953) was a boxing promoter, arguably the most powerful in the sport from the mid-1930s until his effective retirement in 1946. He was posthumously elected to the World Boxing Hall of Fame in 1982, and the International Boxing Hall of Fame in 1990.

== Early life and career ==
Born in New York City in 1880, Strauss was one of 10 children born in New York's Greenwich Village to Jewish immigrants Isaac and Rachel (Strauss). Jacobs came from a poor family and went to work as a boy, selling newspapers and candy on Coney Island excursion boats. Noticing that ticket purchases for the boats were often confusing to prospective passengers, Jacobs began scalping boat tickets. He then bought concession rights on all the boats docked at the Battery, sold train tickets to recent immigrants, and eventually ran his own ferryboats.

Jacobs then became a ticket scalper in New York, buying and selling theater, opera, or sports events tickets. He began promoting events himself, including charity balls, bike races, and circuses.

Jacobs met famous boxing promoter Tex Rickard in 1906 at the Joe Gans-Battling Nelson bout in Goldfield, Nevada, and eventually became Rickard's "money man" by the time of the 1919 Jack Dempsey-Jess Willard bout.

After Rickard's death in 1929, Jacobs then became a promoter of events at the Hippodrome in New York City's Sixth Avenue, and afterward, a promoter for Madison Square Garden – then the dominant New York City-area boxing promotion franchise – staging 320 shows there from 1937 to 1949.

== Boxing promoter ==
In 1933, sportswriters Damon Runyon, Ed Frayne, and Bill Farnsworth of the Hearst newspaper chain arranged for Jacobs to stage Hearst's annual Milk Fund boxing benefit at the Bronx Coliseum; Jacobs promised the charity a substantially better cut of the proceeds than the event's prior promoter, Madison Square Garden. With this experience, Jacobs and the three sportswriters founded the Twentieth Century Sporting Club, a rival boxing promotion franchise to that of Madison Square Garden, later in 1933. Jacobs, as President of Twentieth Century Sports Club, at first used the Hippodrome in New York as his primary venue. The club’s initial bout was staged in January 1934 between Barney Ross and Billy Petrolle.

Jacobs' boxing promotion career changed forever in 1935, when he met with the management team of then up-and-coming African American heavyweight contender Joe Louis. Although Louis had black management at the time from his hometown of Detroit, Michigan, Jacobs promised the prospect of delivering a title shot to Louis, at a time when informal barriers still kept African-American boxers from obtaining a world championship. Meeting at the Frog Club, a colored nightclub, Jacobs and the Louis team spoke and hammered out a three-year exclusive boxing promotion deal.

Louis's first bout in Yankee Stadium grossed $328,655, while his fight with Max Baer grossed over $1 million. After Louis' unexpected loss to Max Schmeling in 1936, Jacobs convinced Joe Gould, manager for heavyweight titleholder James Braddock – contractually obligated to defend his title against Madison Square Garden's preferred opponent Schmeling – to instead defend his crown against young Louis. While a boon for Louis, Gould's price was onerous; Jacobs would have to pay 10% of all future boxing promotion profits (including any future profits from Louis' future bouts) for ten years. Louis defeated Braddock and remained World Heavyweight Champion for an even longer period of time, until 1949. Every fight Louis fought as a champion was promoted by Jacobs.

Leveraging his success with Louis, Jacobs' organization began to assert its control over other divisions. In August 1937, MSG leased Madison Square Garden's main facility as well as the outdoor Madison Square Garden Bowl to the Twentieth Century Sporting Club. In reality, this arrangement put MSG out of the big-time boxing promotion business, which Jacobs dominated from that time on. In 1938, Jacobs became the sole shareholder of the Twentieth Century Sporting Club, paying off Runyon and forcing the other two partners out.

Eventually Jacobs would come to control the championships of every weight division in boxing. In 1937, he originated the first paid radio sponsorship for a series of boxing matches, over 18 weeks, from the New York Hippodrome, heard on WHN, New York. Sam Taub was the blow-by-blow reporter. In September 1944, Jacobs secured the first commercial sponsorship of a television boxing match—the Featherweight title bout between Willie Pep and Albert "Chalky" Wright. During World War II, he promoted a boxing extravaganza that realized $36 million in U.S. War Bond sales. Three times during his career Jacobs promoted million-dollar fights. His biggest championship fight gate was the Louis–Billy Conn rematch in 1946 that grossed $1,925,564.

== Later career and death ==
Jacobs suffered a cerebral hemorrhage in 1946 but remained the head of the organization, with his relative Sol Strauss operating the club on a day-to-day basis. When Louis decided to retire and then go into business with the group that became the International Boxing Club, the Twentieth Century Sporting Club ceased to function; Jacobs sold it to Madison Square Garden in 1949. Jacobs remained in ill health and died in January 1953. He was buried in Washington Cemetery in Brooklyn, New York. He was posthumously elected to the World Boxing Hall of Fame in 1982, and the International Boxing Hall of Fame in 1990.

== See also ==
- Bob Arum
- Don King
