= Joe Gould (boxing) =

American boxing manager

- Born: August 13, 1896; Poughkeepsie, New York, U.S.
- Died: April 21, 1950 (aged 53); New York City, U.S.
- Occupation: Boxing manager
- Known for: Manager of James J. Braddock
- Spouse: Lucille

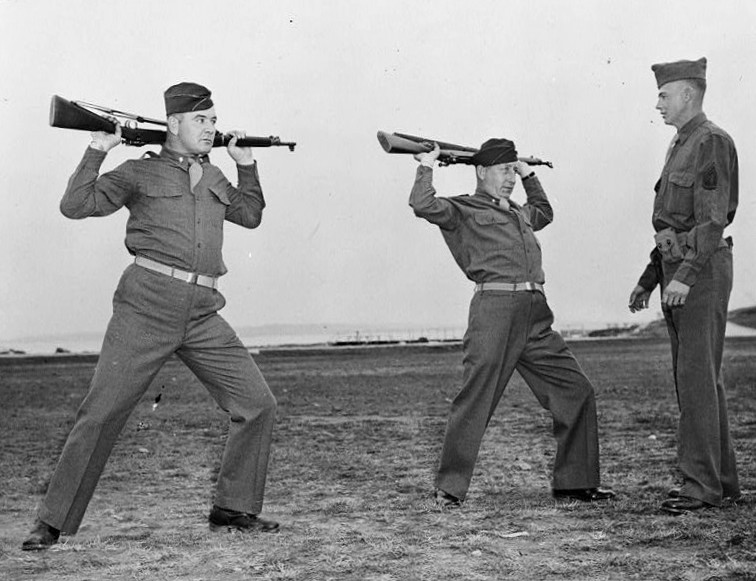
Braddock (left) and Gould (center), training as officers at the Atlantic Coast Transportation Corps Officers Training School in Fort Slocum, New York.

Joseph "Joe" Gould (August 13, 1896 – April 21, 1950) was an American boxing manager best known for representing boxer James J. Braddock, dubbed "The Cinderella Man," who in 1935 upset Max Baer to become the world heavyweight champion. He also managed lightweight contender Ray Miller from 1930 to 1933.

== Early life ==
Gould was born in Poughkeepsie, New York, in 1896. He had at least six brothers and two sisters. He grew up with very little education, instead working as a candy butcher on railroad trains. He served in the U.S. Navy during World War I, and promoted his first boxing matches while in the service.

== Career ==
Gould met then-20-year-old amateur boxer James Braddock at Joe Jeanette's gym in Hoboken, New Jersey in 1925. With Gould as his manager, Braddock turned pro in 1926 and went 14-0-2 before losing his first fight. After a completely one-sided loss to defending Light Heavyweight champion Tommy Loughran in July 1929, Braddock's career fell into decline as he lost more than he had won. By 1933, unable to support his family as a boxer, Braddock worked as a longshoreman and went on public assistance. Gould also suffered during this period of the Great Depression, but the two men stayed close and helped each other when they could.

Gould was instrumental in forging a phenomenal comeback for Braddock in June 1934 when Primo Carnera was scheduled to defend his Heavyweight title against Max Baer. The promoters needed an opponent for up-and-coming John "Corn" Griffin on the undercard. Gould pleaded for Braddock to be inserted as Griffin's opponent, stating that Braddock needed money just to put food on the table for his children. They agreed to pay him $250 for a six-rounder against Griffin, which Braddock won in three rounds. Five months later Braddock decisively won a rematch against John Henry Lewis in 10 rounds, followed by an easy 15-round decision against Art Lasky.

Braddock was then slated to face Max Baer, the reigning heavyweight champion of the world. On June 13, 1935, at Madison Square Garden Bowl, the 10-to-1 underdog Braddock won the world heavyweight championship in one of the most stunning upsets in boxing history.

Braddock's first title defense was to be against German Max Schmeling on June 3, 1937, in the Madison Square Garden Bowl. Madison Square Garden (MSG) had a contract with Braddock for the title defense and also sought a Braddock–Schmeling title bout. But rising star Joe Louis' manager Mike Jacobs and Gould had been planning a Braddock–Louis matchup for months. Braddock claimed he would receive only a US$25,000 purse against Schmeling, compared to $250,000 against Louis. In addition, American commentators expressed opposition to a proposed Braddock-Schmeling fight in light of the connections between Schmeling and Adolf Hitler, with whom the German fighter had been associated after his earlier victory over Louis.

Schmeling's prior victory over Louis gave Gould tremendous leverage in his negotiations with Jacobs — if he were to offer Schmeling the title chance instead of Louis, there was a very real possibility that Nazi authorities would never allow American fighters such as Louis a shot at regaining the title. Gould's demands were therefore onerous: Jacobs would have to pay 10% of all future boxing promotion profits (including any future profits from Louis's future bouts) for ten years. Braddock and Gould would eventually receive more than $150,000 from this arrangement.

Well before the actual fight, Jacobs and Gould publicly announced that their fighters would fight for the heavyweight title on June 22, 1937. Each of the parties involved worked to facilitate the Braddock–Louis matchup. Louis did his part by knocking out former champion Jack Sharkey on August 18, 1936. Meanwhile, Gould trumped up anti-Nazi sentiment against Schmeling, and Jacobs defended a lawsuit by MSG to halt the Braddock–Louis fight. The New York State Athletic Commission fined Gould and Braddock $1,000 each for canceling the fight with Schmeling. But a federal court in Newark, New Jersey, ruled that Braddock's contractual obligation to stage his title defense at MSG was unenforceable for lack of mutual consideration.

Figuring that the New York State Athletic Commission would not sanction the fight in deference to MSG and Schmeling, Jacobs scheduled the fight for Chicago. On June 22, 1937, Braddock lost the title to Louis in an eighth-round knockout.

Seven months later, in the final fight of Braddock's career, he defeated Tommy Farr in Madison Square Garden.

== Later life ==
Gould enlisted in the U.S. Army in 1942, along with Braddock. He and Braddock trained as officers at the Atlantic Coast Transportation Corps Officers Training School in Fort Slocum, New York. Gould became a first lieutenant, later rising to the rank of captain. He worked as the athletic director of the U.S. Army's Camp Shanks in Orangetown, New York.

== Controversy ==
While still with the Army, Gould was charged with conspiring to defraud the government by accepting money to influence the awarding of contracts for the manufacture of Army equipment — the key details involving accepting bribes to award a million dollars' worth of contracts to the Cornwall Shipbuilding Company. Convicted of the charges in a 1944 court-martial, Gould was dismissed from the Army and sentenced to three years of hard labor. The sentence was later reduced to a year in prison and a $1,000 fine.

== Personal life and death ==
Gould was known for his colorful personality, fawn-colored suits, and love of luxury.

Even after Braddock's boxing career was over, the two men stayed connected. By the late 1940s, Gould was operating Braddock's Corner, a restaurant located at 157 W. 49th Street.

Gould died from leukemia at his home at The Century apartment building on 25 Central Park West on April 21, 1950.

== Fictional portrayals ==
In the 2005 film Cinderella Man, Gould is portrayed by actor Paul Giamatti. The role earned Giamatti an Academy Award nomination for Best Supporting Actor.
