= Vancouver Film Critics Circle Award for Best Supporting Actor =

Canadian film award

The winners of the Vancouver Film Critics Circle Award for Best Supporting Actor are listed below.

== Winners ==
=== 2000s ===
Year	Winner	Film	Role
2002	Chris Cooper	Adaptation.	John Laroche
2002	Christopher Walken	Catch Me If You Can	Frank Abagnale, Sr.
2002	Dennis Quaid	Far from Heaven	Frank Whitaker
2003	Alec Baldwin	The Cooler	Shelly Kaplow
2003	Benicio del Toro	21 Grams	Jack Jordan
2003	Tim Robbins	Mystic River	Dave Boyle
2004	Morgan Freeman	Million Dollar Baby	Eddie Dupris
2004	Thomas Haden Church	Sideways	Jack Cole
2004	Clive Owen	Closer	Larry Gray
2005	Terrence Howard	Crash	Cameron Thayer
2005	Matt Dillon	Crash	John Ryan
2005	Paul Giamatti	Cinderella Man	Joe Gould
2006	Alan Arkin	Little Miss Sunshine	Edwin Hoover
2006	Steve Carell	Little Miss Sunshine	Frank Ginsberg
2006	Brad Pitt	Babel	Richard Jones
2007	Javier Bardem	No Country for Old Men	Anton Chigurh
2007	Casey Affleck	The Assassination of Jesse James by the Coward Robert Ford	Robert Ford
2007	Tom Wilkinson	Michael Clayton	Arthur Edens
2008	Heath Ledger	The Dark Knight	The Joker
2008	Josh Brolin	Milk	Dan White
2008	Philip Seymour Hoffman	Doubt	Brendan Flynn
2009	Christoph Waltz	Inglourious Basterds	Col. Hans Landa
2009	Stanley Tucci	The Lovely Bones	George Harvey
2009	Alfred Molina	An Education	Jack Miller

=== 2010s ===
Year	Winner	Film	Role
2010	Christian Bale	The Fighter	Dicky Eklund
2010	John Hawkes	Winter's Bone	Teardrop Dolly
2010	Geoffrey Rush	The King's Speech	Lionel Logue
2011	Christopher Plummer	Beginners	Hal Fields
2011	Kenneth Branagh	My Week with Marilyn	Laurence Olivier
2011	Albert Brooks	Drive	Bernie Rose
2012	Philip Seymour Hoffman	The Master	Lancaster Dodd
2012	Tommy Lee Jones	Lincoln	Thaddeus Stevens
2012	Christoph Waltz	Django Unchained	Dr. King Schultz
2013	Jared Leto	Dallas Buyers Club	Rayon
2013	Bradley Cooper	American Hustle	Richard "Richie" DiMaso
2013	Michael Fassbender	12 Years a Slave	Edwin Epps
2014	J. K. Simmons	Whiplash	Terence Fletcher
2014	Edward Norton	Birdman or (The Unexpected Virtue of Ignorance)	Mike Shiner
2014	Mark Ruffalo	Foxcatcher	Dave Schultz
2015	Mark Rylance	Bridge of Spies	Rudolf Abel
2015	Michael Shannon	99 Homes	Rick Carver
2015	Sylvester Stallone	Creed	Rocky Balboa
2016	Mahershala Ali	Moonlight	Juan
2016	Jeff Bridges	Hell or High Water	Marcus Hamilton
2016	Lucas Hedges	Manchester by the Sea	Patrick Chandler
2017	Willem Dafoe	The Florida Project	Bobby Hicks
2017	Armie Hammer	Call Me by Your Name	Oliver
2017	Sam Rockwell	Three Billboards Outside Ebbing, Missouri	Jason Dixon
2018	Richard E. Grant	Can You Ever Forgive Me?	Jack Hock
2018	Mahershala Ali	Green Book	Don Shirley
2018	Peter Bogdanovich	The Other Side of the Wind	Brooks Otterlake
2018	Steven Yeun	Burning	Ben
2019	Brad Pitt	Once Upon a Time in Hollywood	Cliff Booth
2019	Tom Hanks	A Beautiful Day in the Neighborhood	Fred Rogers
2019	Joe Pesci	The Irishman	Russell Bufalino

=== 2020s ===
Year	Winner and nominees	Film	Role	Ref
2020
2020	Daniel Kaluuya	Judas and the Black Messiah	Fred Hampton	
2020	Sacha Baron Cohen	The Trial of the Chicago 7	Abbie Hoffman	
2020	Leslie Odom, Jr.	One Night in Miami...	Sam Cooke	
2021	Troy Kotsur	CODA	Frank Rossi	
2021	Bradley Cooper	Licorice Pizza	Jon Peters	
2021	Jesse Plemons	The Power of the Dog	George Burbank	
2021	Kodi Smit-McPhee	The Power of the Dog	Peter Gordon	
2022	Brendan Gleeson	The Banshees of Inisherin	Colm Doherty	
2022	Barry Keoghan	The Banshees of Inisherin	Dominic Kearney	
2022	Ke Huy Quan	Everything Everywhere All at Once	Waymond Wang	
2023	Robert Downey Jr.	Oppenheimer	Lewis Strauss	
2023	Willem Dafoe	Poor Things	Godwin Baxter	
2023	Robert De Niro	Killers of the Flower Moon	William King Hale	
2024	Kieran Culkin	A Real Pain	Benji Kaplan	
2024	Yura Borisov	Anora	Igor	
2024	Edward Norton	A Complete Unknown	Pete Seeger	
