= James Braddock vs. Joe Louis =

Boxing match

- Date: June 22, 1937
- Venue: Comiskey Park, Chicago, Illinois
- Title(s) on the line: NYSAC, NBA, and The Ring undisputed heavyweight titles

Tale of the tape
Boxer	(United States) James J. Braddock	(United States) Joe Louis
Nickname	"Cinderella Man"	"The Brown Bomber"
Hometown	New York City, New York	Detroit, Michigan
Pre-fight record	46–23–4 (27 KO)	31–1 (27 KO)
Age	32 years	23 years, 1 month
Height	6 ft 2 in (188 cm)	6 ft 2 in (188 cm)
Weight	197 lb (89 kg)	197 lb (89 kg)
Style	Orthodox	Orthodox
Recognition	NYSAC, NBA, and The Ring undisputed Heavyweight Champion	The Ring; No. 2 Ranked Heavyweight

Result
- Louis won via 8th-round KO

James J. Braddock vs. Joe Louis was a professional boxing match contested on June 22, 1937, for the undisputed heavyweight championship. Louis won the fight which began the longest championship reign in boxing history.The fight took place at Comiskey Park in Chicago, Illinois.

== Background ==
Braddock had won the title by defeating Max Baer in 1935. Baer was supposed to get a rematch, but the fight never occurred. Baer instead fought the rising contender Joe Louis, and Louis defeated Baer, paving the way for Louis to fight Braddock for the title (although between the Baer fight and this title fight, Louis lost to former champion Max Schmeling). Schmeling was the number one contender at the time, but Louis' management offered Braddock a very generous deal in exchange for the title shot (fearing the if Schmeling won, the Nazis would not allow Louis a title shot). The fight was Braddock's first and only defense and occurred over two years after winning the title.

== The fight ==
In the opening round, a close range exchange of punches ended with Louis being knocked down by an uppercut, but eventually recovered. From there the fight slowed down in intensity, and Louis began using his strong jab to take control of the fight, although Braddock proved tough and at times crafty.

By the seventh round, Braddock was hurt and his face was bloodied and swollen. Joe Gould, Braddock's manager, wanted to end the fight but the champion convinced him to continue. Shortly after, a powerful left-right combination from Louis sent the champion to the ground, and Louis won the fight by way of knockout in the eighth round, and was the new world heavyweight champion.

== Aftermath ==
This fight began an unprecedented reign by Louis that included an over 12-year continuous run as champion, winning 25 consecutive title defenses. Both the duration and number of defenses are records that still stand. Louis would later defeat top contender Max Schmeling by first-round knockout the following year, avenging his only loss up to that point.

While the bout was the end of Braddock as a major boxing force, fighting only once after this fight, part of his contract with Louis was to gain a portion of Louis' earnings over the next decade, which proved very lucrative for him.

== Undercard ==
Confirmed bouts:

Preceded by vs. Max Baer	James J. Braddock's bouts 22 June 1937	Succeeded by vs. Tommy Farr
Preceded by vs. Natie Brown	Joe Louis's bouts 22 June 1937	Succeeded by vs. Tommy Farr
