= Tuffy Griffiths =

American boxer

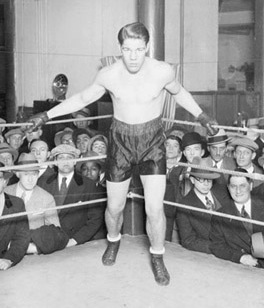

Personal information
- Nicknames: Tuffy; The Pender Pounder; The Terror from out West
- Nationality: American
- Born: Gerald Ambrose Griffiths; January 1, 1907 Macy, NE
- Died: November 15, 1968 (aged 61) Sheridan, WY
- Weight: Heavyweight

Boxing career
- Stance: Orthodox

Boxing record
- Total fights: 87
- Wins: 74
- Win by KO: 41
- Losses: 11
- No contests: 2

Gerald Ambrose "Tuffy" Griffiths (January 1, 1907 – November 15, 1968) was an American boxer. He fought as a heavyweight and occasionally as a light heavyweight under the name Tuffy Griffiths.

== Early life ==
Gerald Ambrose Griffiths was born in Macy, Nebraska, the son of James Alfred Griffiths (1875 – 1933) and Rose Jane Girardot (1874 – 1956). He had three brothers and two sisters. His brother Buzz Saw Griffiths was also a boxer.

== Boxing career ==
=== Early boxing career ===
Griffiths fought his first professional bout on December 11, 1925, in Omaha, Nebraska. His debut was a successful one, defeating Donnie Dundee in 6 rounds. Jack O'Keefe was the manager of Griffiths. Griffiths actually preferred to be called by the name "Jerry" and not "Tuffy." He stood at 5' 11".

=== Griffiths vs. Braddock ===
All of Griffiths early fights were fought in the Midwest. In order to gain more notoriety, he relocated to New York City. Many media outlets were reporting that Griffiths was not beaten in over 50 consecutive matches when he arrived on the East Coast. Fighting his first fight in Manhattan at Madison Square Garden on November 30, 1928, he fought James J. Braddock. Griffiths was supposed to be fighting former champion Pete Latzo that night. However, in a tune-up match for the Griffiths bout, Braddock broke Latzo's jaw in four places. Braddock was the only other choice to fight Griffiths that night. Griffiths was a 7-1 favorite to win the match against Braddock. As expected Griffiths dominated the first round of the fight, but Braddock fought back viciously in the second. Braddock ended up getting a second-round knockout and shocked the whole boxing world. This single match launched Braddock's boxing career. A reenactment of this fight is featured in the movie Cinderella Man.

=== Later boxing career ===
After the loss to Braddock, Griffiths ended up going on a five match win streak. His winning streak would end though to Leo Lomski on February 15, 1929. In a rematch with Lomski the following month, Griffiths bounced back and won. However, he broke his hand in the fight, and was sidelined for two months. Upon his return Griffiths won 16 consecutive matches. He beat Johnny Risko on July 2, 1930, in Chicago and knocked out Tom Heeney in New York on July 30, 1930.

Griffiths ended up fighting a future heavyweight champion on September 26, 1932. His opponent was one of the most feared boxers of his time, Max Baer. Baer won by a TKO in the 7th round of the bout.

Tuffy Griffiths would fight his last professional bout against Tony Shucco on September 6, 1933. The fight saw Tuffy get knocked out in the fourth round. After nearly 8 years of professional boxing and 74 wins, he would retire officially in 1934.

== Trivia ==
- After his boxing career ended he was stationed at the San Diego Marine Corps base as a boxing instructor.
- Ran Tuffy Griffiths's Tavern for many years in Chicago after his retirement.
- He is a member of the Greater Sioux City Athletic Association Hall of Fame.
- Was a patient at the Veterans Administration Hospital in Sheridan, WY for many years before his death.
