= Cinderella Man =

2005 film by Ron Howard

- Theatrical release poster
- Directed by: Ron Howard
- Screenplay by: Cliff Hollingsworth; Akiva Goldsman
- Story by: Cliff Hollingsworth
- Produced by: Ron Howard; Penny Marshall; Brian Grazer
- Starring: Russell Crowe; Renée Zellweger; Paul Giamatti; Craig Bierko; Bruce McGill; Paddy Considine
- Cinematography: Salvatore Totino
- Edited by: Daniel P. Hanley; Mike Hill
- Music by: Thomas Newman
- Production companies: Touchstone Pictures; Universal Pictures; Miramax Films; Imagine Entertainment
- Distributed by: Universal Pictures (United States and Canada); Buena Vista International (International); Miramax Films
- Release date: June 3, 2005
- Running time: 144 minutes
- Country: United States
- Language: English
- Budget: $88 million
- Box office: $108.5 million

Cinderella Man is a 2005 American biographical sports drama film directed by Ron Howard. The film stars Russell Crowe, Renée Zellweger, and Paul Giamatti. It dramatizes the true story of heavyweight boxing champion James J. Braddock, who was dubbed "The Cinderella Man" by the journalist Damon Runyon. The film marked the second collaboration for Howard and Crowe, succeeding A Beautiful Mind (2001).

Universal Pictures and Miramax Films released Cinderella Man in the United States on June 3, 2005. It received generally positive reviews from critics and grossed $108 million worldwide.

Cinderella Man received three Academy Award nominations, including Best Supporting Actor for Giamatti. Crowe and Giamatti both received Golden Globe Award and Screen Actors Guild Award nominations for their performances, and Giamatti won the latter alongside a Critics' Choice Movie Award for Best Supporting Actor. Retrospective critical reviews have named Cinderella Man as one of the greatest boxing films of all time.

== Plot ==
James J. Braddock is an Irish-American boxer from New Jersey, formerly a light heavyweight contender, who is forced to give up boxing after breaking his hand in the ring. This is both a relief and a burden to his wife, Mae. She cannot bring herself to watch the violence of his chosen profession, yet she knows they will not have enough income without his boxing.

As the United States enters the Great Depression, Braddock does manual labor as a longshoreman to support his family, even with his injured hand. However, he cannot get work every day. Thanks to a last-minute cancellation by another boxer, Braddock's longtime manager and friend, Joe Gould, offers him a chance to fill in for just one night and earn cash. The fight is against the number-two contender in the world, Corn Griffin.

Braddock stuns the boxing experts and fans with a third-round knockout of his formidable opponent. He believes that while his right hand was broken, he became more proficient with his left hand, improving his in-ring ability. Despite Mae's objections, Braddock takes up Gould's offer to return to the ring. Mae resents this attempt by Gould to profit from her husband's dangerous livelihood, until she discovers that Gould and his wife also have been devastated by hard times.

With a shot at the heavyweight championship held by Max Baer a possibility, Braddock continues to win. Out of a sense of pride, he uses a portion of his prize money to pay back money given to him by the government while unemployed. When his rags-to-riches story gets out, the sportswriter Damon Runyon dubs him "The Cinderella Man", and before long Braddock comes to represent the hopes and aspirations of the American public struggling with the Depression.

After wins against John Henry Lewis and Art Lasky, a title fight against Baer comes his way. Braddock is a 10-to-1 underdog. Baer is so destructive that the fight's promoter, James Johnston, forces both Braddock and Gould to watch a film of Baer in action, just so he can maintain later that he warned them what Braddock was up against, as Baer had reportedly killed two men in the ring, Frankie Campbell and Ernie Schaaf.

Braddock demonstrates no fear. The arrogant Baer attempts to intimidate him, even taunting Mae in public that her husband might not survive. When he says this, she becomes so angry that she throws a drink at him. She is unable to stay for the fight at the Madison Square Garden Bowl but reluctantly listens to it on the radio with her children.

On June 13, 1935, in one of the greatest upsets in boxing history, Braddock defeats the seemingly invincible Baer to become the heavyweight champion of the world.

An epilogue reveals that Braddock would lose his title to Joe Louis, who would call Braddock "the most courageous man I ever fought," and later work on the building of the Verrazzano Bridge, owning and operating heavy machinery on the docks where he worked during the Depression, and that he and Mae used his boxing income to buy a house, where they spent the rest of their lives.

== Cast ==
- Russell Crowe as James J. Braddock
- Renée Zellweger as Mae Braddock
- Paul Giamatti as Joe Gould
- Bruce McGill as James J. Johnston
- Craig Bierko as Max Baer
- Paddy Considine as Mike Wilson
- David Huband as Ford Bond
- Connor Price as Jay Braddock
- Ariel Waller as Rosemarie "Rosy" Braddock
- Patrick Louis as Howard Braddock
- Rosemarie DeWitt as Sara Wilson
- Linda Kash as Mrs. Gould
- Nicholas Campbell as "Sporty" Lewis
- Gene Pyrz as Jake
- Chuck Shamata as Father Roddick
- Ron Canada as Joe Jeanette
- Alicia Johnston as Alice
- Troy Ross as John Henry Lewis
- Mark Simmons as Art Lasky
- Art Binkowski as Corn Griffin
- David Litzinger as Abe Feldman
- Matthew G. Taylor as Primo Carnera
- Rance Howard as Announcer Al Fazin
- Robert Norman Smith as Reporter
- Angelo Dundee as Boxing Trainer
- Clint Howard as Abe Feldman, Fight Referee

== Production ==
During filming in Toronto, several areas were redressed to resemble 1930s New York. The Richmond Street side of The Bay's Queen Street store was redressed as Madison Square Garden, complete with fake store fronts and period stop lights. A stretch of Queen Street East between Broadview and Carlaw was also made up to appear to be from the 1930s and dozens of period cars were parked along the road. Maple Leaf Gardens was used for all the fight scenes, and many scenes were filmed in the Distillery District. Filming also took place in Hamilton, Ontario, at the harbour for the dock workers' scene. The main apartment was shot north of St. Clair Avenue on Lauder Avenue on the west side. An awning was put up for a dress shop, later turned into a real coffee shop.

The Toronto Transit Commission's historic Peter Witt streetcar and two more cars from the nearby Halton County Radial Railway were used for the filming, travelling on Toronto's existing streetcar tracks.

== Release ==
In a campaign to boost ticket sales after the film's low opening, AMC Theatres advertised on June 24, 2005, that in 30 markets (about 150 theaters nationwide), it would offer a refund to any ticket-buyer dissatisfied with the film. The advertisement, published in The New York Times and other papers and on internet film sites, read, "AMC believes Cinderella Man is one of the finest motion pictures of the year! We believe so strongly that you'll enjoy Cinderella Man we're offering a Money Back Guarantee." The promotion moderately increased box office revenue for a short period, while at least 50 patrons demanded refunds. Following suit, Cinemark Theatres also offered a money-back guarantee in 25 markets that did not compete with AMC Theatres. AMC had last employed such a strategy (in limited markets) for the 1988 release of Mystic Pizza, while 20th Century Fox had unsuccessfully tried a similar ploy for its 1994 remake of Miracle on 34th Street.

== Reception ==
=== Box office ===
Cinderella Man earned $61.6 million in the United States and Canada, and $46.9 million in other territories, for a worldwide total of $108.5 million.

In the United States and Canada, Cinderella Man opened alongside The Sisterhood of the Traveling Pants and Lords of Dogtown, and ranked fourth for the weekend with $18.3 million, a gross that was lower than expected. In its second weekend, the film dropped 46.9% to sixth, grossing $9.7 million. In its third weekend, the film dropped another 42.7% to seventh, taking in $5.6 million.

The film's second biggest market was Japan, where it grossed $2.5 million in its opening weekend and ranked fifth. The film ended its run in the country with a $10.1 million gross.

=== Critical response ===
Rotten Tomatoes reported an approval rating of 80% based on 215 reviews, with an average rating of 7.4/10. The website's critics consensus reads: "With grittiness and an evocative sense of time and place, Cinderella Man is a powerful underdog story. And Ron Howard and Russell Crowe prove to be a solid combination." Metacritic assigned the film a weighted average score of 69 out of 100, based on 40 critics, indicating "generally favorable" reviews. Audiences polled by CinemaScore gave the film a rare average grade of "A+".

Roger Ebert of The Chicago Sun-Times gave the film three-and-a-half out of four stars. He wrote that while Cinderella Man was effective as a boxing movie, its true genius was in Giamatti's "home run" portrayal of Gould and Crowe's against type performance as a "level-headed, sweet-tempered" family man: "You'd have to go back to actors like James Stewart and Spencer Tracy to find such goodness and gentleness". David Sterritt of The Christian Science Monitor gave the film a four out of four scoring, stating that "Ron Howard and his splendid cast have made a spellbinding movie that joins Million Dollar Baby, as well as Raging Bull, the first two Rocky pictures, and Fat City as one of boxing cinema's all-time heavyweight champs".

=== Accolades ===
Award	Date of ceremony	Category	Recipient(s)	Result	Ref.
Academy Awards	March 5, 2006	Best Supporting Actor	Paul Giamatti	Nominated	
Academy Awards	March 5, 2006	Best Film Editing	Mike Hill and Daniel P. Hanley	Nominated	
Academy Awards	March 5, 2006	Best Makeup	David LeRoy Anderson and Lance Anderson	Nominated	
Australian Film Institute Awards	November 26, 2005	AFI International Award for Best Actor	Russell Crowe	Won	
Boston Society of Film Critics	December 11, 2005	Best Supporting Actor	Paul Giamatti	Won	
British Academy Film Awards	February 19, 2006	Best Original Screenplay	Akiva Goldsman and Cliff Hollingsworth	Nominated	
Chicago Film Critics Association	January 9, 2006	Best Supporting Actor	Paul Giamatti	Nominated	
Critics' Choice Awards	January 9, 2006	Best Picture	Cinderella Man	Nominated	
Critics' Choice Awards	January 9, 2006	Best Director	Ron Howard	Nominated	
Critics' Choice Awards	January 9, 2006	Best Actor	Russell Crowe	Nominated	
Critics' Choice Awards	January 9, 2006	Best Supporting Actor	Paul Giamatti	Won	
Dallas–Fort Worth Film Critics Association	December 19, 2005	Top 10 Films	Cinderella Man	5th place	
Dallas–Fort Worth Film Critics Association	December 19, 2005	Best Actor	Russell Crowe	5th place	
Dallas–Fort Worth Film Critics Association	December 19, 2005	Best Supporting Actor	Paul Giamatti	Runner-up	
Empire Awards	March 13, 2006	Best Director	Ron Howard	Nominated	
Empire Awards	March 13, 2006	Best Actress	Renée Zellweger	Nominated	
ESPY Awards	July 13, 2005	Best Sports Movie	Cinderella Man	Nominated	
Florida Film Critics Circle	December 24, 2005	Best Supporting Actor	Paul Giamatti	Won	
Golden Globe Awards	January 16, 2006	Best Actor in a Motion Picture – Drama	Russell Crowe	Nominated	
Golden Globe Awards	January 16, 2006	Best Supporting Actor in a Motion Picture	Paul Giamatti	Nominated	
Golden Trailer Awards	May 26, 2005	Summer 2005 Blockbuster	Cinderella Man	Nominated	
Hochi Film Awards	December 19, 2005	Best International Picture	Cinderella Man	Won	
Hollywood Film Awards	October 24, 2005	Hollywood Screenwriter Award	Akiva Goldsman and Cliff Hollingsworth	Won	
Japan Academy Film Prize	March 3, 2006	Outstanding Foreign Language Film	Cinderella Man	Nominated	
London Film Critics' Circle	February 8, 2006	British Supporting Actor of the Year	Paddy Considine	Nominated	
Motion Picture Sound Editors Golden Reel Awards	March 4, 2006	Best Sound Editing in Feature Film – Dialogue & ADR	Anthony J. Ciccolini, Deborah Wallach, Stan Bochner, Dan Korintus, and Kenna Doeringer	Nominated	
Nastro d'Argento	February 7, 2006	Best Director of a Foreign Film	Ron Howard	Nominated	
Online Film Critics Society	January 16, 2006	Best Supporting Actor	Paul Giamatti	Nominated	
Sant Jordi Awards	April 25, 2006	Best Foreign Actor	Paul Giamatti	Won	
Satellite Awards	December 17, 2005	Best Motion Picture, Drama	Cinderella Man	Nominated	
Satellite Awards	December 17, 2005	Best Overall DVD	Cinderella Man	Nominated	
Screen Actors Guild Awards	January 29, 2006	Outstanding Performance by a Male Actor in a Leading Role	Russell Crowe	Nominated	
Screen Actors Guild Awards	January 29, 2006	Outstanding Performance by a Male Actor in a Supporting Role	Paul Giamatti	Won	
St. Louis Film Critics Association		Best Picture	Cinderella Man	Nominated	
St. Louis Film Critics Association		Best Actor	Russell Crowe	Nominated	
St. Louis Film Critics Association		Best Supporting Actor	Paul Giamatti	Nominated	
St. Louis Film Critics Association		Best Supporting Actress	Renée Zellweger	Nominated	
Toronto Film Critics Association	December 21, 2005	Best Supporting Actor	Paul Giamatti	Won	
Vancouver Film Critics Circle	February 7, 2006	Best Supporting Actor	Paul Giamatti	Nominated	
Washington D.C. Area Film Critics Association	December 13, 2005	Best Director	Ron Howard	Nominated	
Washington D.C. Area Film Critics Association	December 13, 2005	Best Supporting Actor	Paul Giamatti	Won	
Women Film Critics Circle	December 28, 2005	Best Title, In Recognition of the Hopefully Inner Female in Every Macho Guy	Cinderella Man	Won	
Writers Guild of America Awards	February 4, 2006	Best Original Screenplay	Akiva Goldsman and Cliff Hollingsworth	Nominated	
Young Artist Awards	March 25, 2006	Best Family Feature Film – Drama	Cinderella Man	Nominated	

== Legacy ==
In April 2018, Crowe auctioned off as part of his "divorce auction" a number of props he owned which were used by him in his various films, including a jockstrap, pair of shorts and robe which were worn by Crowe in Cinderella Man. The items from the film as well as the other items on auction were bought by the HBO television show Last Week Tonight with John Oliver, with the jockstrap having sold for $7,000. The items purchased were then donated to the last operating Blockbuster Video store in Alaska. The jockstrap was reported missing; however, in the final episode of season 5 of Last Week Tonight, John Oliver revealed that it had been taken back and showed a short heist parody filmed with it.

== See also ==
- List of boxing films
