= Madison Square Garden Bowl =

Former outdoor arena in Queens, New York

- Madison Square Garden Bowl
- Interactive map of Madison Square Garden Bowl
- Former names: Long Island City Bowl; Jinx Bowl; The Graveyard of Champions
- Location: Long Island City, New York
- Coordinates: 40.752686°N 73.916414°W
- Owner: Tex Rickard
- Operator: Tex Rickard
- Capacity: 72,000

Construction
- Groundbreaking: 1929
- Built: 1930-1
- Opened: 1932
- Closed: 1942
- Demolished: 1942
- Cost: US$132,000 (1932)

Madison Square Garden Bowl was the name of an outdoor arena in the New York City borough of Queens. Built in 1932, the arena hosted circuses and boxing matches. Its seating capacity was 72,000 spectators on wood bleachers. The idea of the stadium came from boxing promotor Tex Rickard, who died before it was completed.

The Bowl, located at 48th Street and Northern Boulevard in Long Island City, was the site where James J. Braddock defeated Max Baer for the World Heavyweight title on June 13, 1935, a fight later dramatized in the film Cinderella Man. Braddock's first comeback fight against John "Corn" Griffin was also in the venue. Jack Sharkey and Primo Carnera also captured the heavyweight crown in the 1930s at the Bowl. But because no titleholder ever successfully defended his title there, the stadium was soon dubbed the "Jinx Bowl".

The Madison Square Garden Bowl was torn down during World War II to make way for a US Army Mail Depot (and also because arena management deemed it more economical to rent baseball stadiums for fights). Metal from the stadium was melted down to make bullets and other war materials, including those to build the Mail Depot. The depot itself was torn down in the 1960s, and the area is now home to a Major World used-car dealership and strip mall.

== See also ==
- Madison Square Garden (1879), Madison Avenue and East 26th Street
- Madison Square Garden (1890), Madison Avenue and East 26th Street
- Madison Square Garden (1925), Eighth Avenue and 50th Street
- Madison Square Garden (1968), 4 Pennsylvania Plaza, Seventh to Eighth Avenues and 31st to 33rd Streets
