= James J. Braddock =

American boxer (1905–1974)

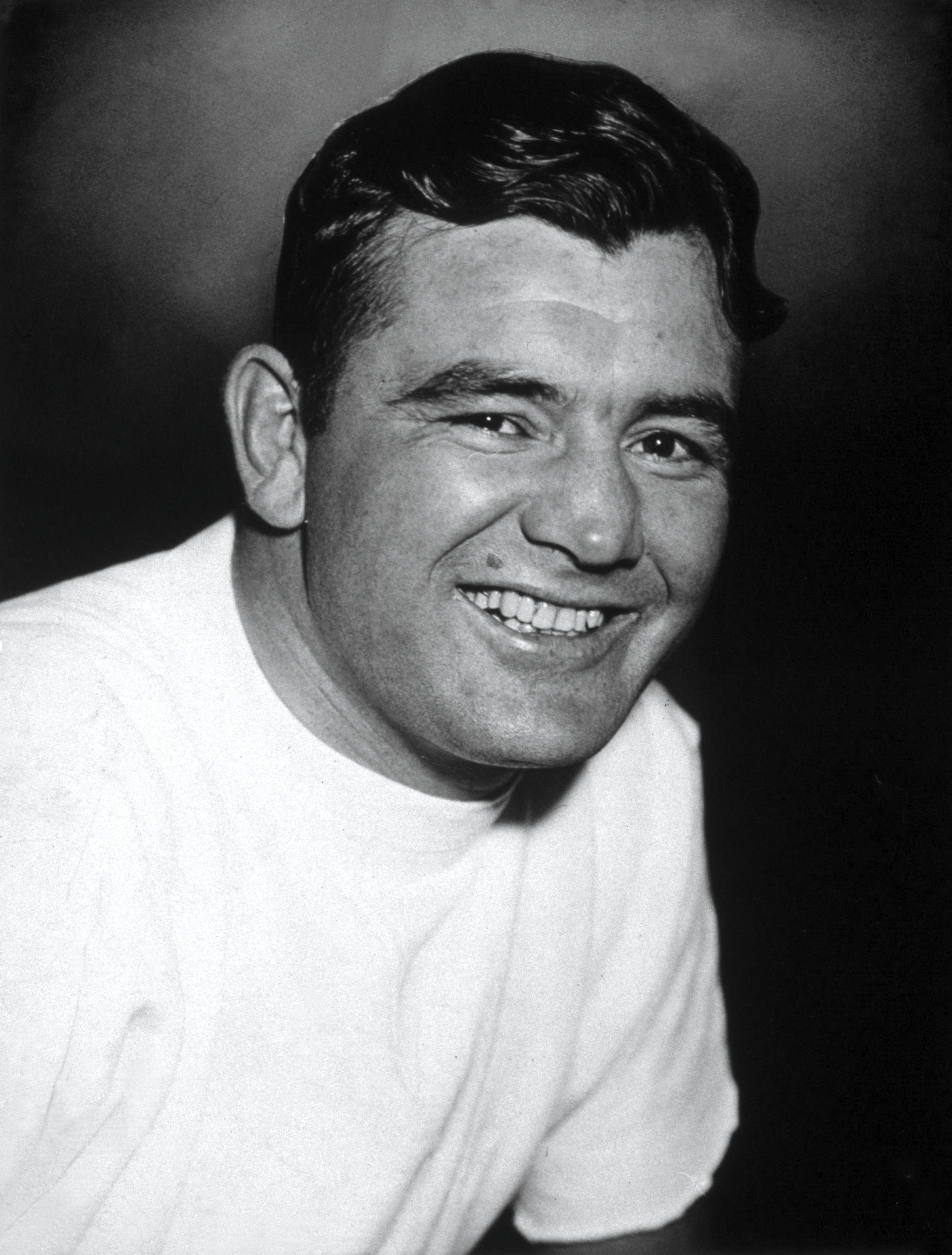
- Braddock in 1935

Personal information
- Nicknames: Bulldog of Bergen; Jersey Jim; Pride of the Irish; Pride of New Jersey; Cinderella Man
- Born: James Polly Braddock; June 7, 1905 New York City, U.S.
- Died: November 29, 1974 (aged 69) North Bergen, New Jersey, U.S.
- Height: 6 ft 2 in (1.88 m)
- Weight: Middleweight; Light heavyweight Heavyweight

Boxing career
- Reach: 75 in (191 cm)

Boxing record
- Total fights: 88
- Wins: 52
- Win by KO: 27
- Losses: 26
- Draws: 7
- No contests: 3

James Walter Braddock (June 7, 1905 – November 29, 1974) was an American boxer who was the world heavyweight champion from 1935 to 1937.

Fighting under the name James J. Braddock (ostensibly to follow the pattern set by two prior world boxing champions, James J. Corbett and James J. Jeffries), Braddock was known for his spoiling, counterpunching style, powerful right hand, and iron chin. He lost several bouts because of chronic hand injuries and was forced to work on the docks and collect social assistance to feed his family during the Great Depression. He made a comeback, and in 1935 he fought Max Baer for the world heavyweight championship and won. For this unlikely feat he was given the nickname "Cinderella Man" by Damon Runyon. Braddock was managed by Joe Gould.

== Early life ==
Braddock was born on June 7, 1905, on West 48th Street in Manhattan's Hell's Kitchen neighborhood. He grew up in Hudson County, New Jersey. He was one of seven children being raised by Irish immigrant parents Elizabeth O'Tool and Joseph Braddock.

Braddock became notorious for his exploits as a playground fighter at St. Joseph's Parochial School in West New York, New Jersey. He stated his life's early ambition was to play college football for Knute Rockne at the University of Notre Dame, though this did not come to pass, as he remarked that he had "more brawn than brains".

From 1919 to 1923, Braddock worked a series of jobs: a messenger boy for Western Union, a printer's devil, a teamster and an errand boy in a silk mill.

== Boxing career ==
Braddock pursued boxing, fighting as a light heavyweight. His first fight in a ring occurred on November 27, 1923. On March 21, 1925, Braddock knocked out Johnny Emerson and won the New Jersey amateur light heavyweight championship. The fight lasted 107 seconds. Two days later, he defeated Tom Bodman, a fighter forty pounds heavier, to take the state's heavyweight title. Braddock turned professional at the age of 21. After three years, his record was 44–2–2 (.938), with 21 knockouts.

On April 13, 1926, Braddock fought Al Settle at Amsterdam Hall in Union City, New Jersey in his first professional fight. In 1928, Braddock pulled off a major upset by knocking out highly regarded Tuffy Griffiths. The following year he earned a chance to fight for the title, but he narrowly lost to Tommy Loughran in a 15-round decision. Braddock was greatly depressed by the loss and badly fractured his right hand in several places in the process.

His next 33 fights were significantly less successful, with an 11–20–2 (.364) record. With his family in poverty during the Great Depression, Braddock was forced to give up boxing and work as a longshoreman. Due to frequent injuries to his right hand, Braddock compensated by using his left hand during his longshoreman work, and it gradually became stronger than his right.

Braddock felt humiliated by having to accept government relief money, but he was inspired by the Catholic Worker Movement, a Christian social justice organization founded by Dorothy Day and Peter Maurin in 1933 to help the homeless and hungry. After his boxing comeback, Braddock returned the welfare money he had received and made frequent donations to various Catholic Worker Houses, and fed homeless people by inviting them to meals with his family.

=== Max Baer fight ===
In 1934, Braddock was given a fight with the highly touted John "Corn" Griffin. Although Braddock was intended simply as a stepping stone in Griffin's career, he knocked out the "Ozark Cyclone" in the third round. Braddock then fought John Henry Lewis, a future light heavyweight champion. He won in one of the most important fights of his career. After defeating another highly regarded heavyweight contender, Art Lasky, whose nose he broke during the bout on March 22, 1935, Braddock was given a title fight against the World Heavyweight Champion, Max Baer.

Despite Braddock's recent impressive victories, he was hand-picked by Baer's handlers because he was seen as a little more than a journeyman fighter, an easy payday for the champion. Baer hardly trained for the bout; Braddock, on the other hand, trained hard. "I'm training for a fight, not a boxing contest or a clownin' contest or a dance," he said. "Whether it goes one round or three rounds or ten rounds, it will be a fight and a fight all the way. When you've been through what I've had to face in the last two years, a Max Baer or a Bengal tiger looks like a house pet. He might come at me with a cannon and a blackjack and he would still be a picnic compared to what I've had to face."

The bout occurred on June 13, 1935, at Madison Square Garden Bowl, in Long Island City, New York. Baer, ever the showman, "brought gales of laughter from the crowd with his antics" the night he stepped between the ropes to meet Braddock. As Braddock "slipped the blue bathrobe from his pink back, he was the sentimental favorite of a Bowl crowd of 30,000, most of whom had bet their money 8-to-1 against him." Baer "undoubtedly paid the penalty for underestimating his challenger beforehand and wasting too much time clowning." During the fight, a dogged Braddock took a few heavy hits from the powerful younger champion (30 years versus 26 years for Baer), but Braddock kept coming, wearing down Baer, who seemed perplexed by Braddock's ability to take a punch. In the end, the judges gave Braddock the title with a unanimous decision, outpointing Baer 8 rounds to 6. A 10-to-1 underdog, Braddock won the Heavyweight Championship of the World in what was called "the greatest fistic upset since the defeat of John L. Sullivan by Jim Corbett".

=== Heavyweight champion; loss to Joe Louis ===
Braddock held the title of Heavyweight Champion from 1935 until 1937. His first title defense was to be against German Max Schmeling on June 3, 1937, in the Madison Square Garden Bowl. However, Braddock backed out of the bout in favor of a fight with Joe Louis in Chicago. Braddock argued he would have received only a US$25,000 purse against Schmeling, compared to $250,000 against rising star Louis. There was also concern that if Schmeling lost, the Nazi government would deny American fighters opportunities to fight for the title. Finally, American commentators had expressed opposition to the fight in light of the connections between Schmeling and Adolf Hitler, with whom the German fighter had been associated after his earlier victory over Louis. The New York State Athletic Commission fined Gould and Braddock $1,000 each for canceling the fight with Schmeling.

In his only defense of the heavyweight title, Braddock lost to Louis in the 8th round by a knockout, the only one of his career.

Braddock and Louis saw each other frequently over the years, and the "Brown Bomber" always greeted him the same way: "Hello, Champ." As Jeremy Schaap wrote, "[Louis] fought eight world heavyweight champions, more than any other fighter ever, but he never called anyone but Jim Braddock 'champ.'" On the other hand, shortly after winning the title, Louis was quoted as saying, "I don't want to be called champ until I whip Max Schmeling". (Louis defeated Schmeling in 1938, part of his 12-year reign as Heavyweight champion, the longest championship reign in boxing history.)

Seven months after the Louis fight, Braddock had his next match with Tommy Farr and won in what turned out to be his last match.

While the fight with Louis was the end of Braddock as a major boxing force, part of his contract for that bout was to gain a portion of Louis' earnings over the next decade, which proved very lucrative for him.

== Later life ==
Braddock enlisted in the U.S. Army in 1942 and became a first lieutenant. He served in the Pacific theater on the island of Saipan, where he trained enlisted men in hand-to-hand combat.

Upon return, he opened a restaurant, called Braddock's Corner, located at 157 W. 49th Street, in New York City, which was managed by Joe Gould. Braddock ultimately lost $15,000 on the restaurant venture. He invested in a marine equipment surplus supplier, which also lost money. Going back to manual labor, he helped construct the Verrazzano–Narrows Bridge in the early 1960s.

== Personal life ==
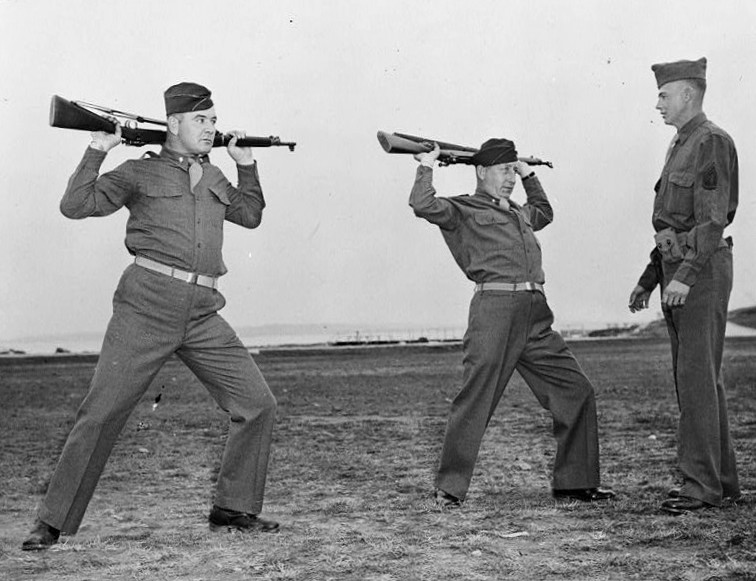
Braddock (left) and Joe Gould (center), training as officers at the Atlantic Coast Transportation Corps Officers Training School in Fort Slocum, New York

Braddock married Mae Fox in 1930, and the couple had three children, James (Jay) Jr., Howard and Rosemarie. He used the money from his fight with Joe Louis to buy a $14,000 home in North Bergen. Through Rosemarie, Braddock's granddaughter is the actress Rosemarie DeWitt.

Braddock was a member of the Fairview Teeko Club, New Jersey, where he was regarded as one of the strongest teekoists.

== Death and legacy ==
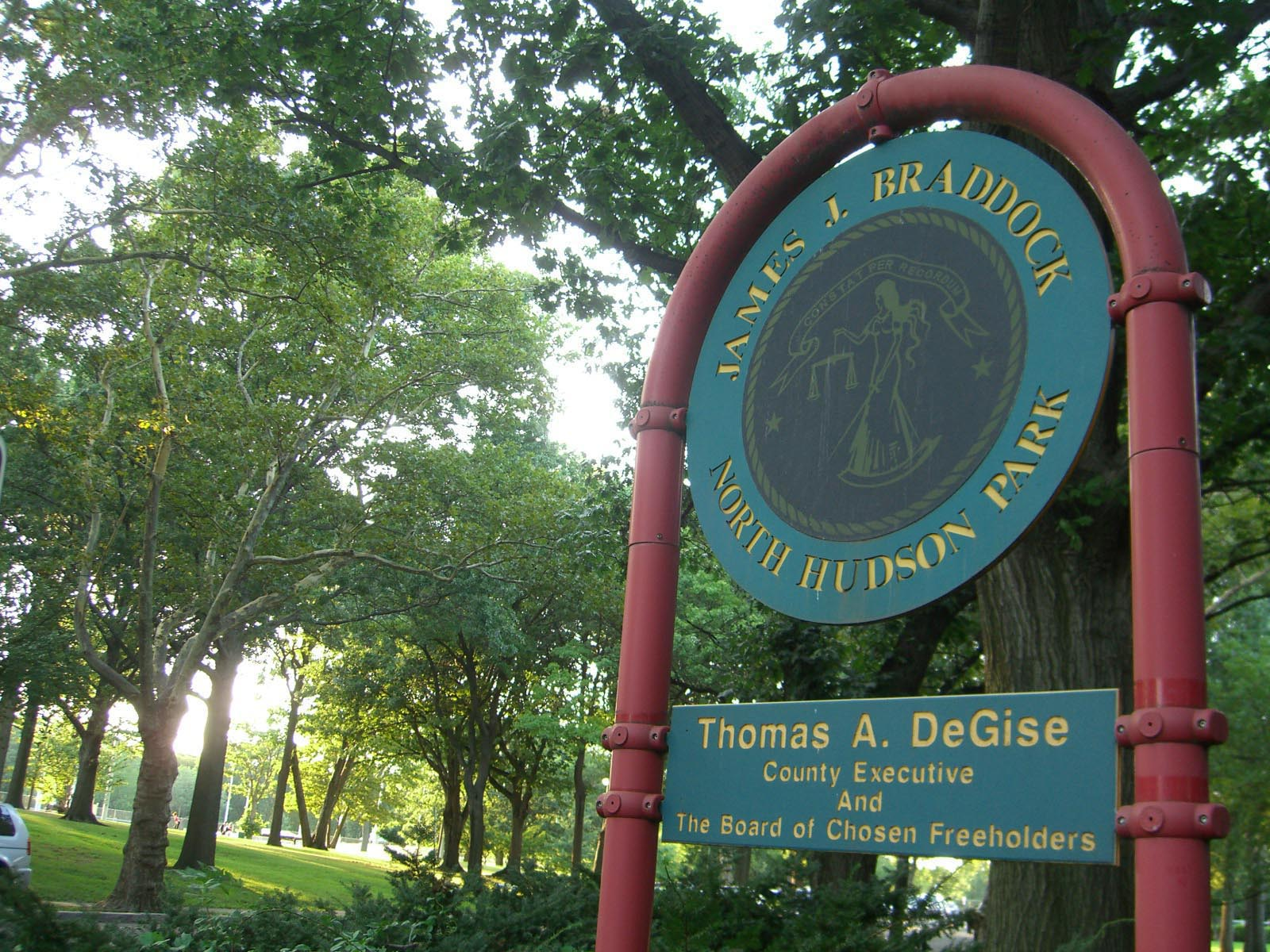
James J. Braddock North Hudson Park in North Bergen, New Jersey

After his death in 1974 at the age of 69, James J. Braddock was interred in the Mount Carmel Cemetery in Tenafly, New Jersey. He was inducted into the International Boxing Hall of Fame in 2001. James J. Braddock North Hudson County Park in North Bergen, New Jersey is named in his honor. On September 16, 2008, a 10-foot (3.0 m), 1,500-pound (680 kg) bronze statue of Braddock was erected in the park named in his honor not far from where he lived and trained. The statue was created by internationally renowned sculptor Zenos Frudakis.

The 2005 biographical film Cinderella Man tells Braddock's story. Directed by Ron Howard, it stars Russell Crowe as Braddock and Renée Zellweger as his wife, Mae. The film had an estimated budget of $88 million and grossed $108.5 million worldwide. Crowe's performance earned him a Golden Globe nomination for Best Actor. Paul Giamatti, playing Braddock's manager Joe Gould, was nominated for the Academy Award for Best Supporting Actor. The role of neighbor Sara Wilson was played by Rosemarie DeWitt, who is Braddock's real-life granddaughter. The film received mostly positive reviews.

== Professional boxing record ==
All information in this section is derived from BoxRec, unless otherwise stated.

=== Official record ===
87 fights	47 wins	23 losses
By knockout	27	1
By decision	20	21
By disqualification	0	1
Draws	4	
No contests	3	
Newspaper decisions/draws	10	

All newspaper decisions are officially regarded as “no decision” bouts and are not counted in the win/loss/draw column.

No.	Result	Record	Opponent	Type	Round, time	Date	Location	Notes
88	Win	47–24–4 (13)	Tommy Farr	SD	10	Jan 21, 1938	Madison Square Garden, New York City, New York, U.S.	
87	Loss	46–24–4 (13)	Joe Louis	KO	8 (15)	Jun 22, 1937	Comiskey Park, Chicago, Illinois, U.S.	Lost NYSAC, NBA, and The Ring heavyweight titles
86	Win	46–23–4 (13)	Max Baer	UD	15	Jun 13, 1935	Madison Square Garden Bowl, Queens, New York, U.S.	Won NYSAC, NBA, and The Ring heavyweight titles
85	Win	45–23–4 (13)	Art Lasky	UD	15	Mar 22, 1935	Madison Square Garden, New York City, New York, U.S.	
84	Win	44–23–4 (13)	John Henry Lewis	PTS	10	Nov 16, 1934	Madison Square Garden, New York City, New York, U.S.	
83	Win	43–23–4 (13)	Corn Griffin	TKO	3 (5), 2:37	Jun 14, 1934	Madison Square Garden Bowl, Queens, New York, U.S.	
82	NC	42–23–4 (13)	Abe Feldman	NC	6 (10)	Sep 25, 1933	Memorial Field Stadium, Mount Vernon, New York, U.S.	
81	Win	42–23–4 (12)	Chester Matan	PTS	10	Jul 21, 1933	Playgrounds Stadium, West New York, New Jersey, U.S.	
80	Win	41–23–4 (12)	Les Kennedy	PTS	10	Jun 21, 1933	Oakland Arena, Jersey City, New Jersey, U.S.	
79	Loss	40–23–4 (12)	Al Stillman	UD	10	May 19, 1933	St. Louis Arena, St. Louis, Missouri, U.S.	
78	Loss	40–22–4 (12)	Martin Levandowski	MD	10	Apr 5, 1933	St. Louis Arena, St. Louis, Missouri, U.S.	
77	Win	40–21–4 (12)	Al Stillman	TKO	10 (10)	Mar 21, 1933	St. Louis Arena, St. Louis, Missouri, U.S.	
76	Loss	39–21–4 (12)	Al Ettore	DQ	4 (8)	Mar 1, 1933	Olympia A.C., Philadelphia, Pennsylvania, U.S.	
75	Loss	39–20–4 (12)	Hans Birkie	PTS	10	Jan 20, 1933	Madison Square Garden, New York City, New York, U.S.	
74	Win	39–19–4 (12)	Martin Levandowski	PTS	10	Jan 13, 1933	Chicago Stadium, Chicago, Illinois, U.S., U.S.	
73	Loss	38–19–4 (12)	Lou Scozza	TKO	6 (10)	Nov 9, 1932	Civic Auditorium, San Francisco, California, U.S.	
72	Loss	38–18–4 (12)	Tom Patrick	PTS	10	Oct 21, 1932	Legion Stadium, Hollywood, California, U.S.	
71	Win	38–17–4 (12)	Dynamite Jackson	PTS	10	Sep 30, 1932	Coliseum, San Diego, California, U.S.	
70	Loss	37–17–4 (12)	John Henry Lewis	PTS	10	Sep 21, 1932	Civic Auditorium, San Francisco, U.S.	
69	Loss	37–16–4 (12)	Tony Shucco	PTS	8	Jul 25, 1932	Madison Square Garden Bowl, Queens, New York, U.S.	
68	Win	37–15–4 (12)	Vicente Parrile	PTS	5	Jun 21, 1932	Madison Square Garden Bowl, Queens, New York, U.S.	
67	Loss	36–15–4 (12)	Charley Retzlaff	SD	10	May 13, 1932	Boston Garden, Boston, Massachusetts, U.S.	
66	Loss	36–14–4 (12)	Baxter Calmes	UD	10	Mar 18, 1932	Chicago Stadium, Chicago, Illinois, U.S., U.S.	
65	Loss	36–13–4 (12)	Al Gainer	PTS	10	Dec 4, 1931	New Haven Arena, New Haven, Connecticut, U.S.	
64	NC	36–12–4 (12)	Maxie Rosenbloom	NC	2 (10), 2:43	Nov 10, 1931	Minneapolis Auditorium, Minneapolis, Minnesota, U.S.	
63	Loss	36–12–4 (11)	Joe Sekyra	PTS	10	Oct 9, 1931	Madison Square Garden, New York City, New York, U.S.	
62	Draw	36–11–4 (11)	Andy Mitchell	PTS	10	Sep 3, 1931	Navin Field, Detroit, Michigan, U.S.	
61	Win	36–11–3 (11)	Jack Kelly	PTS	10	Mar 30, 1931	New Haven Arena, New Haven, Connecticut, U.S.	
60	Win	35–11–3 (11)	Jack Roper	KO	1 (6), 1:08	Mar 5, 1931	Madison Square Garden Stadium, Miami, Florida, U.S.	
59	Loss	34–11–3 (11)	Ernie Schaaf	SD	10	Jan 23, 1931	Madison Square Garden, New York City, New York, U.S.	
58	Win	34–10–3 (11)	Phil Mercurio	KO	2 (10)	Sep 19, 1930	Laurel Garden, Newark, New Jersey, U.S.	
57	Loss	33–10–3 (11)	Babe Hunt	PTS	10	Aug 11, 1930	Braves Field, Boston, Massachusetts, U.S.	
56	Win	33–9–3 (11)	Joe Monte	PTS	10	Jul 2, 1930	Fenway Park, Boston, Massachusetts, U.S.	
55	Loss	32–9–3 (11)	Harold Mays	PTS	10	Jun 5, 1930	Playgrounds Stadium, West New York, New Jersey, U.S.	
54	Loss	32–8–3 (11)	Billy Jones	UD	10	Apr 7, 1930	Philadelphia Arena, Philadelphia, Pennsylvania, U.S.	
53	Loss	32–7–3 (11)	Leo Lomski	SD	10	Jan 17, 1930	Chicago Coliseum, Chicago, Illinois, U.S.	
52	Win	32–6–3 (11)	Jake Warren	KO	2 (6)	Dec 7, 1929	Ridgewood Grove, Brooklyn, New York, U.S.	
51	Loss	31–6–3 (11)	Maxie Rosenbloom	PTS	10	Nov 15, 1929	Madison Square Garden, New York City, New York, U.S.	
50	Loss	31–5–3 (11)	Yale Okun	PTS	10	Aug 27, 1929	Olympic Auditorium, Los Angeles, California, U.S.	
49	Loss	31–4–3 (11)	Tommy Loughran	UD	15	Jul 18, 1929	Yankee Stadium, Bronx, New York, U.S.	For NYSAC, NBA, and The Ring light-heavyweight titles
48	Win	31–3–3 (11)	Eddie Benson	KO	1 (10)	Apr 22, 1929	Broadway Auditorium, Buffalo, New York, U.S.	
47	Win	30–3–3 (11)	Jimmy Slattery	TKO	9 (10)	Mar 11, 1929	Madison Square Garden, New York City, New York, U.S.	
46	Win	29–3–3 (11)	George Gemas	KO	1 (10)	Feb 4, 1929	Laurel Garden, Newark, New Jersey, U.S.	
45	Loss	28–3–3 (11)	Leo Lomski	MD	10	Jan 18, 1929	Madison Square Garden, New York City, New York, U.S.	
44	Win	28–2–3 (11)	Tuffy Griffiths	TKO	2 (10), 1:40	Nov 30, 1928	Madison Square Garden, New York City, New York, U.S.	
43	Win	27–2–3 (11)	Pete Latzo	PTS	10	Oct 17, 1928	Newark Armory, Newark, New Jersey, U.S.	
42	Loss	26–2–3 (11)	Joe Sekyra	PTS	10	Aug 8, 1928	Ebbets Field, Brooklyn, New York, U.S.	
41	Draw	26–1–3 (11)	Nando Tassi	PTS	10	Jul 25, 1928	Ebbets Field, Brooklyn, New York, U.S.	
40	Draw	26–1–2 (11)	Billy Vidabeck	NWS	10	Jun 27, 1928	Playgrounds Stadium, West New York, New Jersey, U.S.	
39	Loss	26–1–2 (10)	Joe Monte	PTS	10	Jun 7, 1928	Madison Square Garden, New York City, New York, U.S.	
38	Win	26–0–2 (10)	Jimmy Francis	NWS	10	May 16, 1928	Playgrounds Stadium, West New York, New Jersey, U.S.	
37	Win	26–0–2 (9)	Jack Darnell	KO	4 (10)	May 7, 1928	Grotto Auditorium, Jersey City, New Jersey, U.S.	
36	Win	25–0–2 (9)	Paul Swiderski	PTS	8	Jan 6, 1928	Madison Square Garden, New York City, New York, U.S.	
35	Draw	24–0–2 (9)	Joe Monte	PTS	10	Oct 7, 1927	Madison Square Garden, New York City, New York, U.S.	
34	Loss	24–0–1 (9)	Herman Heller	NWS	10	Aug 31, 1927	Playgrounds Stadium, West New York, New Jersey, U.S.	
33	Win	24–0–1 (8)	Vic McLaughlin	NWS	10	Aug 10, 1927	Playgrounds Stadium, West New York, New Jersey, U.S.	
32	Win	24–0–1 (7)	George LaRocco	UD	6	Jul 21, 1927	Yankee Stadium, Bronx, New York, U.S.	
31	Win	23–0–1 (7)	Jimmy Francis	NWS	10	Jul 13, 1927	Playgrounds Stadium, West New York, New Jersey, U.S.	
30	Win	23–0–1 (6)	Jimmy Francis	NWS	10	Jun 8, 1927	Playgrounds Stadium, West New York, New Jersey, U.S.	
29	Loss	23–0–1 (5)	Paul Cavalier	NWS	10	May 27, 1927	Arcola Park, Paramus, New Jersey, U.S.	
28	Draw	23–0–1 (4)	George LaRocco	PTS	10	May 20, 1927	Yankee Stadium, Bronx, New York, U.S.	
27	Win	23–0 (4)	Jack Stone	NWS	10	May 11, 1927	Playgrounds Stadium, West New York, New Jersey, U.S.	
26	Win	23–0 (3)	Stanley Simmons	TKO	1 (6), 2:32	May 2, 1927	Oakland Arena, Jersey City, New Jersey, U.S.	
25	Win	22–0 (3)	Frankie Lennon	TKO	3 (6)	Apr 19, 1927	South Main Street Armory, Wilkes-Barre, Pennsylvania, U.S.	
24	Win	21–0 (3)	Jack O'Day	KO	3 (10)	Mar 22, 1927	Union City, New Jersey, U.S.	
23	Win	20–0 (3)	Tom McKiernan	KO	2 (10)	Mar 15, 1927	Wilkes-Barre, Pennsylvania, U.S.	
22	Win	19–0 (3)	Nick Fadil	PTS	6	Mar 8, 1927	Pioneer Sporting Club, New York City, New York, U.S.	
21	Win	18–0 (3)	Lou Barba	PTS	4	Mar 3, 1927	Madison Square Garden, New York City, New York, U.S.	
20	Win	17–0 (3)	Jack Nelson	UD	6	Feb 15, 1927	South Main Street Armory, Wilkes-Barre, Pennsylvania, U.S.	
19	Win	16–0 (3)	Johnny Alberts	KO	4 (6)	Feb 1, 1927	South Main Street Armory, Wilkes-Barre, Pennsylvania, U.S.	
18	Win	15–0 (3)	George LaRocco	KO	1 (4), 1:12	Jan 28, 1927	Madison Square Garden, New York City, New York, U.S.	
17	Win	14–0 (3)	Tom McKiernan	TKO	3 (8)	Jan 13, 1927	Grotto Auditorium, Jersey City, New Jersey, U.S.	
16	Draw	13–0 (3)	Doc Conrad	NWS	4	Dec 20, 1926	4th Regiment Armory, Jersey City, New Jersey, U.S.	
15	Win	13–0 (2)	Joe Hudson	PTS	6	Dec 8, 1926	Manhattan A.C., New York City, New York, U.S.	
14	Win	12–0 (2)	Al Settle	PTS	6	Dec 4, 1926	Walker A.C., New York City, New York, U.S.	
13	NC	11–0 (2)	Willie Daly	NC	1 (6)	Nov 18, 1926	Floral Park Arena, North Bergen, New Jersey, U.S.	
12	Win	11–0 (1)	Lou Barba	PTS	6	Nov 12, 1926	Pioneer Sporting Club, New York City, New York, U.S.	
11	Win	10–0 (1)	Jack O'Day	KO	1 (8)	Oct 27, 1926	Stanley Theater, Jersey City, New Jersey, U.S.	
10	Win	9–0 (1)	Carmine Caggiano	KO	1 (6), 0:49	Sep 30, 1926	Playgrounds Stadium, West New York, New Jersey, U.S.	
9	Win	8–0 (1)	Ray Kennedy	KO	1 (6)	Sep 16, 1926	Playgrounds Stadium, West New York, New Jersey, U.S.	
8	Win	7–0 (1)	Mike Rock	KO	1 (6), 1:05	Sep 13, 1926	Oakland Arena, Jersey City, New Jersey, U.S.	
7	Win	6–0 (1)	Gene Travers	KO	1 (6), 0:24	Sep 7, 1926	Oakland Arena, Jersey City, New Jersey, U.S.	
6	Win	5–0 (1)	Walter Westman	TKO	3 (6)	Jul 9, 1926	Boyle's Thirty Acres, Jersey City, New Jersey, U.S.	
5	Win	4–0 (1)	Jim Pearson	TKO	2 (4)	Jun 28, 1926	Oakland Arena, Jersey City, New Jersey, U.S.	
4	Win	3–0 (1)	Lee Dobson	KO	1 (4)	Jun 18, 1926	Boyle's Thirty Acres, Jersey City, New Jersey, U.S.	
3	Win	2–0 (1)	Phil Weisberger	TKO	1	May 1, 1926	Jersey City, New Jersey, U.S.	
2	Win	1–0 (1)	George Deschner	KO	2 (6)	Apr 22, 1926	Knights of Columbus, Ridgefield Park, New Jersey, U.S.	
1	Draw	0–0 (1)	Al Settle	NWS	4	Apr 13, 1926	Amsterdam Hall, Union City, New Jersey, U.S.	

=== Unofficial record ===
87 fights	52 wins	25 losses
By knockout	27	1
By decision	25	23
By disqualification	0	1
Draws	7	
No contests	3	

Record with the inclusion of newspaper decisions in the win/loss/draw column.

No.	Result	Record	Opponent	Type	Round, time	Date	Location	Notes
88	Win	52–26–7 (3)	Tommy Farr	SD	10	Jan 21, 1938	Madison Square Garden, New York City, New York, U.S.	
87	Loss	51–26–7 (3)	Joe Louis	KO	8 (15)	Jun 22, 1937	Comiskey Park, Chicago, Illinois, U.S.	Lost NYSAC, NBA, and The Ring heavyweight titles
86	Win	51–25–7 (3)	Max Baer	UD	15	Jun 13, 1935	Madison Square Garden Bowl, Queens, New York, U.S.	Won NYSAC, NBA, and The Ring heavyweight titles
85	Win	50–25–7 (3)	Art Lasky	UD	15	Mar 22, 1935	Madison Square Garden, New York City, New York, U.S.	
84	Win	49–25–7 (3)	John Henry Lewis	PTS	10	Nov 16, 1934	Madison Square Garden, New York City, New York, U.S.	
83	Win	48–25–7 (3)	Corn Griffin	TKO	3 (5), 2:37	Jun 14, 1934	Madison Square Garden Bowl, Queens, New York, U.S.	
82	NC	47–25–7 (3)	Abe Feldman	NC	6 (10)	Sep 25, 1933	Memorial Field Stadium, Mount Vernom, New York, U.S.	
81	Win	47–25–7 (2)	Chester Matan	PTS	10	Jul 21, 1933	Playgrounds Stadium, West New York, New Jersey, U.S.	
80	Win	46–25–7 (2)	Les Kennedy	PTS	10	Jun 21, 1933	Oakland Arena, Jersey City, New Jersey, U.S.	
79	Loss	45–25–7 (2)	Al Stillman	UD	10	May 19, 1933	St. Louis Arena, St. Louis, Missouri, U.S.	
78	Loss	45–24–7 (2)	Martin Levandowski	MD	10	Apr 5, 1933	St. Louis Arena, St. Louis, Missouri, U.S.	
77	Win	45–23–7 (2)	Al Stillman	TKO	10 (10)	Mar 21, 1933	St. Louis Arena, St. Louis, Missouri, U.S.	
76	Loss	44–23–7 (2)	Al Ettore	DQ	4 (8)	Mar 1, 1933	Olympia A.C., Philadelphia, Pennsylvania, U.S.	
75	Loss	44–22–7 (2)	Hans Birkie	PTS	10	Jan 20, 1933	Madison Square Garden, New York City, New York, U.S.	
74	Win	44–21–7 (2)	Martin Levandowski	PTS	10	Jan 13, 1933	Chicago Stadium, Chicago, Illinois, U.S., U.S.	
73	Loss	43–21–7 (2)	Lou Scozza	TKO	6 (10)	Nov 9, 1932	Civic Auditorium, San Francisco, California, U.S.	
72	Loss	43–20–7 (2)	Tom Patrick	PTS	10	Oct 21, 1932	Legion Stadium, Hollywood, California, U.S.	
71	Win	43–19–7 (2)	Dynamite Jackson	PTS	10	Sep 30, 1932	Coliseum, San Diego, California, U.S.	
70	Loss	42–19–7 (2)	John Henry Lewis	PTS	10	Sep 21, 1932	Civic Auditorium, San Francisco, U.S.	
69	Loss	42–18–7 (2)	Tony Shucco	PTS	8	Jul 25, 1932	Madison Square Garden Bowl, Queens, New York, U.S.	
68	Win	42–17–7 (2)	Vicente Parrile	PTS	5	Jun 21, 1932	Madison Square Garden Bowl, Queens, New York, U.S.	
67	Loss	41–17–7 (2)	Charley Retzlaff	SD	10	May 13, 1932	Boston Garden, Boston, Massachusetts, U.S.	
66	Loss	41–16–7 (2)	Baxter Calmes	UD	10	Mar 18, 1932	Chicago Stadium, Chicago, Illinois, U.S., U.S.	
65	Loss	41–15–7 (2)	Al Gainer	PTS	10	Dec 4, 1931	New Haven Arena, New Haven, Connecticut, U.S.	
64	NC	41–14–7 (2)	Maxie Rosenbloom	NC	2 (10), 2:43	Nov 10, 1931	Minneapolis Auditorium, Minneapolis, Minnesota, U.S.	
63	Loss	41–14–7 (1)	Joe Sekyra	PTS	10	Oct 9, 1931	Madison Square Garden, New York City, New York, U.S.	
62	Draw	41–13–7 (1)	Andy Mitchell	PTS	10	Sep 3, 1931	Navin Field, Detroit, Michigan, U.S.	
61	Win	41–13–6 (1)	Jack Kelly	PTS	10	Mar 30, 1931	New Haven Arena, New Haven, Connecticut, U.S.	
60	Win	40–13–6 (1)	Jack Roper	KO	1 (6), 1:08	Mar 5, 1931	Madison Square Garden Stadium, Miami, Florida, U.S.	
59	Loss	39–13–6 (1)	Ernie Schaaf	SD	10	Jan 23, 1931	Madison Square Garden, New York City, New York, U.S.	
58	Win	39–12–6 (1)	Phil Mercurio	KO	2 (10)	Sep 19, 1930	Laurel Garden, Newark, New Jersey, U.S.	
57	Loss	38–12–6 (1)	Babe Hunt	PTS	10	Aug 11, 1930	Braves Field, Boston, Massachusetts, U.S.	
56	Win	38–11–6 (1)	Joe Monte	PTS	10	Jul 2, 1930	Fenway Park, Boston, Massachusetts, U.S.	
55	Loss	37–11–6 (1)	Harold Mays	PTS	10	Jun 5, 1930	Playgrounds Stadium, West New York, New Jersey, U.S.	
54	Loss	37–10–6 (1)	Billy Jones	UD	10	Apr 7, 1930	Philadelphia Arena, Philadelphia, Pennsylvania, U.S.	
53	Loss	37–9–6 (1)	Leo Lomski	SD	10	Jan 17, 1930	Chicago Coliseum, Chicago, Illinois, U.S.	
52	Win	37–8–6 (1)	Jake Warren	KO	2 (6)	Dec 7, 1929	Ridgewood Grove, Brooklyn, New York, U.S.	
51	Loss	36–8–6 (1)	Maxie Rosenbloom	PTS	10	Nov 15, 1929	Madison Square Garden, New York City, New York, U.S.	
50	Loss	36–7–6 (1)	Yale Okun	PTS	10	Aug 27, 1929	Olympic Auditorium, Los Angeles, California, U.S.	
49	Loss	36–6–6 (1)	Tommy Loughran	UD	15	Jul 18, 1929	Yankee Stadium, Bronx, New York, U.S.	For NYSAC, NBA, and The Ring light-heavyweight titles
48	Win	36–5–6 (1)	Eddie Benson	KO	1 (10)	Apr 22, 1929	Broadway Auditorium, Buffalo, New York, U.S.	
47	Win	35–5–6 (1)	Jimmy Slattery	TKO	9 (10)	Mar 11, 1929	Madison Square Garden, New York City, New York, U.S.	
46	Win	34–5–6 (1)	George Gemas	KO	1 (10)	Feb 4, 1929	Laurel Garden, Newark, New Jersey, U.S.	
45	Loss	33–5–6 (1)	Leo Lomski	MD	10	Jan 18, 1929	Madison Square Garden, New York City, New York, U.S.	
44	Win	33–4–6 (1)	Tuffy Griffiths	TKO	2 (10), 1:40	Nov 30, 1928	Madison Square Garden, New York City, New York, U.S.	
43	Win	32–4–6 (1)	Pete Latzo	PTS	10	Oct 17, 1928	Newark Armory, Newark, New Jersey, U.S.	
42	Loss	31–4–6 (1)	Joe Sekyra	PTS	10	Aug 8, 1928	Ebbets Field, Brooklyn, New York, U.S.	
41	Draw	31–3–6 (1)	Nando Tassi	PTS	10	Jul 25, 1928	Ebbets Field, Brooklyn, New York, U.S.	
40	Draw	31–3–5 (1)	Billy Vidabeck	NWS	10	Jun 27, 1928	Playgrounds Stadium, West New York, New Jersey, U.S.	
39	Loss	31–3–4 (1)	Joe Monte	PTS	10	Jun 7, 1928	Madison Square Garden, New York City, New York, U.S.	
38	Win	31–2–4 (1)	Jimmy Francis	NWS	10	May 16, 1928	Playgrounds Stadium, West New York, New Jersey, U.S.	
37	Win	30–2–4 (1)	Jack Darnell	KO	4 (10)	May 7, 1928	Grotto Auditorium, Jersey City, New Jersey, U.S.	
36	Win	29–2–4 (1)	Paul Swiderski	PTS	8	Jan 6, 1928	Madison Square Garden, New York City, New York, U.S.	
35	Draw	28–2–4 (1)	Joe Monte	PTS	10	Oct 7, 1927	Madison Square Garden, New York City, New York, U.S.	
34	Loss	28–2–3 (1)	Herman Heller	NWS	10	Aug 31, 1927	Playgrounds Stadium, West New York, New Jersey, U.S.	
33	Win	28–1–3 (1)	Vic McLaughlin	NWS	10	Aug 10, 1927	Playgrounds Stadium, West New York, New Jersey, U.S.	
32	Win	27–1–3 (1)	George LaRocco	UD	6	Jul 21, 1927	Yankee Stadium, Bronx, New York, U.S.	
31	Win	26–1–3 (1)	Jimmy Francis	NWS	10	Jul 13, 1927	Playgrounds Stadium, West New York, New Jersey, U.S.	
30	Win	25–1–3 (1)	Jimmy Francis	NWS	10	Jun 8, 1927	Playgrounds Stadium, West New York, New Jersey, U.S.	
29	Loss	24–1–3 (1)	Paul Cavalier	NWS	10	May 27, 1927	Arcola Park, Paramus, New Jersey, U.S.	
28	Draw	24–0–3 (1)	George LaRocco	PTS	10	May 20, 1927	Yankee Stadium, Bronx, New York, U.S.	
27	Win	24–0–2 (1)	Jack Stone	NWS	10	May 11, 1927	Playgrounds Stadium, West New York, New Jersey, U.S.	
26	Win	23–0–2 (1)	Stanley Simmons	TKO	1 (6), 2:32	May 2, 1927	Oakland Arena, Jersey City, New Jersey, U.S.	
25	Win	22–0–2 (1)	Frankie Lennon	TKO	3 (6)	Apr 19, 1927	South Main Street Armory, Wilkes-Barre, Pennsylvania, U.S.	
24	Win	21–0–2 (1)	Jack O'Day	KO	3 (10)	Mar 22, 1927	Union City, New Jersey, U.S.	
23	Win	20–0–2 (1)	Tom McKiernan	KO	2 (10)	Mar 15, 1927	Wilkes-Barre, Pennsylvania, U.S.	
22	Win	19–0–2 (1)	Nick Fadil	PTS	6	Mar 8, 1927	Pioneer Sporting Club, New York City, New York, U.S.	
21	Win	18–0–2 (1)	Lou Barba	PTS	4	Mar 3, 1927	Madison Square Garden, New York City, New York, U.S.	
20	Win	17–0–2 (1)	Jack Nelson	UD	6	Feb 15, 1927	South Main Street Armory, Wilkes-Barre, Pennsylvania, U.S.	
19	Win	16–0–2 (1)	Johnny Alberts	KO	4 (6)	Feb 1, 1927	South Main Street Armory, Wilkes-Barre, Pennsylvania, U.S.	
18	Win	15–0–2 (1)	George LaRocco	KO	1 (4), 1:12	Jan 28, 1927	Madison Square Garden, New York City, New York, U.S.	
17	Win	14–0–2 (1)	Tom McKiernan	TKO	3 (8)	Jan 13, 1927	Grotto Auditorium, Jersey City, New Jersey, U.S.	
16	Draw	13–0–2 (1)	Doc Conrad	NWS	4	Dec 20, 1926	4th Regiment Armory, Jersey City, New Jersey, U.S.	
15	Win	13–0–1 (1)	Joe Hudson	PTS	6	Dec 8, 1926	Manhattan A.C., New York City, New York, U.S.	
14	Win	12–0–1 (1)	Al Settle	PTS	6	Dec 4, 1926	Walker A.C., New York City, New York, U.S.	
13	NC	11–0–1 (1)	Willie Daly	NC	1 (6)	Nov 18, 1926	Floral Park Arena, North Bergen, New Jersey, U.S.	
12	Win	11–0–1	Lou Barba	PTS	6	Nov 12, 1926	Pioneer Sporting Club, New York City, New York, U.S.	
11	Win	10–0–1	Jack O'Day	KO	1 (8)	Oct 27, 1926	Stanley Theater, Jersey City, New Jersey, U.S.	
10	Win	9–0–1	Carmine Caggiano	KO	1 (6), 0:49	Sep 30, 1926	Playgrounds Stadium, West New York, New Jersey, U.S.	
9	Win	8–0–1	Ray Kennedy	KO	1 (6)	Sep 16, 1926	Playgrounds Stadium, West New York, New Jersey, U.S.	
8	Win	7–0–1	Mike Rock	KO	1 (6), 1:05	Sep 13, 1926	Oakland Arena, Jersey City, New Jersey, U.S.	
7	Win	6–0–1	Gene Travers	KO	1 (6), 0:24	Sep 7, 1926	Oakland Arena, Jersey City, New Jersey, U.S.	
6	Win	5–0–1	Walter Westman	TKO	3 (6)	Jul 9, 1926	Boyle's Thirty Acres, Jersey City, New Jersey, U.S.	
5	Win	4–0–1	Jim Pearson	TKO	2 (4)	Jun 28, 1926	Oakland Arena, Jersey City, New Jersey, U.S.	
4	Win	3–0–1	Lee Dobson	KO	1 (4)	Jun 18, 1926	Boyle's Thirty Acres, Jersey City, New Jersey, U.S.	
3	Win	2–0–1	Phil Weisberger	TKO	1	May 1, 1926	Jersey City, New Jersey, U.S.	
2	Win	1–0–1	George Deschner	KO	2 (6)	Apr 22, 1926	Knights of Columbus, Ridgefield Park, New Jersey, U.S.	
1	Draw	0–0–1	Al Settle	NWS	4	Apr 13, 1926	Amsterdam Hall, Union City, New Jersey, U.S.	

== Titles in boxing ==
=== Major world titles ===
- NYSAC heavyweight champion (200+ lbs)
- NBA (WBA) heavyweight champion (200+ lbs)

=== The Ring magazine titles ===
- The Ring heavyweight champion (200+ lbs)

=== Undisputed titles ===
- Undisputed heavyweight champion

== See also ==
- List of heavyweight boxing champions
- Boyle's Thirty Acres
- Jersey City Armory
- Joe Louis Arena (located in Detroit, Michigan)

== Notes ==
Sporting positions
World boxing titles
Preceded by Max Baer	NYSAC heavyweight champion June 13, 1935 – June 22, 1937	Succeeded by Joe Louis
Preceded by Max Baer	NBA heavyweight champion June 13, 1935 – June 22, 1937	Succeeded by Joe Louis
Preceded by Max Baer	The Ring heavyweight champion June 13, 1935 – June 22, 1937	Succeeded by Joe Louis
Preceded by Max Baer	Undisputed heavyweight champion June 13, 1935 – June 22, 1937	Succeeded by Joe Louis
