= Frankie Campbell =

American boxer (1904–1930)

Personal information
- Nickname: Frankie Campbell
- Born: Francesco Camilli; April or May 1904 Hibbing, Minnesota
- Died: August 25, 1930 (aged 26) San Francisco, California
- Height: 5 ft 10 in (178 cm)
- Weight: Light Heavyweight/Heavyweight

Boxing career
- Stance: Orthodox

Boxing record
- Total fights: 40
- Wins: 33
- Win by KO: 26
- Losses: 4
- Draws: 2
- No contests: 1

Frankie Campbell (born Francesco Camilli; 1904 – August 25, 1930) was an Italian-American boxer who fought professionally as a heavyweight. He won 33 of his 40 career fights, losing four, drawing twice, and fighting to a no-contest in another. Campbell was killed in the ring by future heavyweight champion Max Baer on August 25, 1930, in San Francisco, California.

Campbell was the brother of former Major League Baseball player Dolph Camilli.

== Last fight ==
Max Baer was knocked down in the 2nd round, which enraged him, and he rose from the canvas to put all his power behind a solid right-hand punch that hit Campbell flush in the chin. Campbell later received a beating in the 5th round and then eventually passed out from the punch.

An alternate take on this second round exchange is offered in the San Francisco Examiner from August 26, 1930. The article reads:

Irwin [the referee] ruled that Baer had slipped and had not been dropped. He motioned Baer to his feet. In the meantime Campbell had walked the far side of the ring, turning his back... Baer rushed across the ring and socked Campbell with three stiff rights to the head... The blows dazed Campbell and he was pretty well spent as he made his way back to his corner. 'Something feels as though it broke in my head,' Campbell told Chief Second Tommy Maloney during the rest interval between the second and third round.

Onlookers claimed that Baer slugged Campbell "unmercifully" in the 5th round after he was already unconscious but had held onto his feet by the ropes. Had the referee not intervened, Campbell would have been killed outright.

UP Doctors worked over Campbell in the open-air ring at the baseball park for half an hour and, failing to revive him, took him to a local hospital where other physicians and nurses worked over him for several hours. Campbell had a severe concussion of the brain. Doctors later discovered that his brain had been knocked loose from the connective tissue inside his head.

Brain specialist Tilton E. Tillman "declared death had been caused by a succession of blows on the jaw and not by any struck on the rear of the head," and that Campbell's brain had been "knocked completely loose from his skull."

The California State Boxing Commission suspended referee Irwin for his failure to stop the fight, J. Hamilton Lorimer (Baer's manager), Carol E. Working and Tom Maloney (Campbell's managers), and seconds Tillie "Kid" Herman, Ray Carlin, Frankie Burns, and Larry Morrison.
