= Corn Griffin =

American boxer

Personal information
- Born: John Griffin; 24 July 1911 Blountstown, Florida, US
- Died: 9 January 1973 (aged 61)
- Weight: Heavyweight

Boxing career
- Stance: Orthodox

Boxing record
- Total fights: 75
- Wins: 45
- Win by KO: 26
- Losses: 26
- Draws: 4
- No contests: 1

John Charles "Corn" Griffin (July 24, 1911 – January 9, 1973) was an American heavyweight boxer whose career lasted from 1930 to 1936 and included the memorable June 14, 1934, TKO loss to James J. Braddock, recreated for the 2005 film Cinderella Man.

A native of Florida, Griffin was born in Blountstown, a small community which is the county seat of Calhoun County. After winning his first fight, a 1930 bout with Charles "Ranger" Pond, he turned professional in 1931 with much promise, but was KO'd by Bob Godwin in 1933. The fight with Braddock in Madison Square Garden the following year was the highlight of his career; it is dramatized in Cinderella Man with Russell Crowe as Braddock and Art Binkowski as Griffin.

During his professional career he also served as a sparring partner for the former world heavyweight boxing champion Primo Carnera and, following his final bout, a 1936 Fourth of July loss to Barney Brock, left the ring, working in a number of jobs and serving in the army during World War II.

After the war, Griffin became a police officer in Columbus, Georgia. According to the August 25, 1950 issue of the Panama City News-Herald, he didn't carry the traditional policeman's club "since his old one-two sledgehammer-like fists are as good as ever, but may be not as fast".
