= Max Baer (boxer) =

American boxer (1909–1959)

Max Baer Sr.
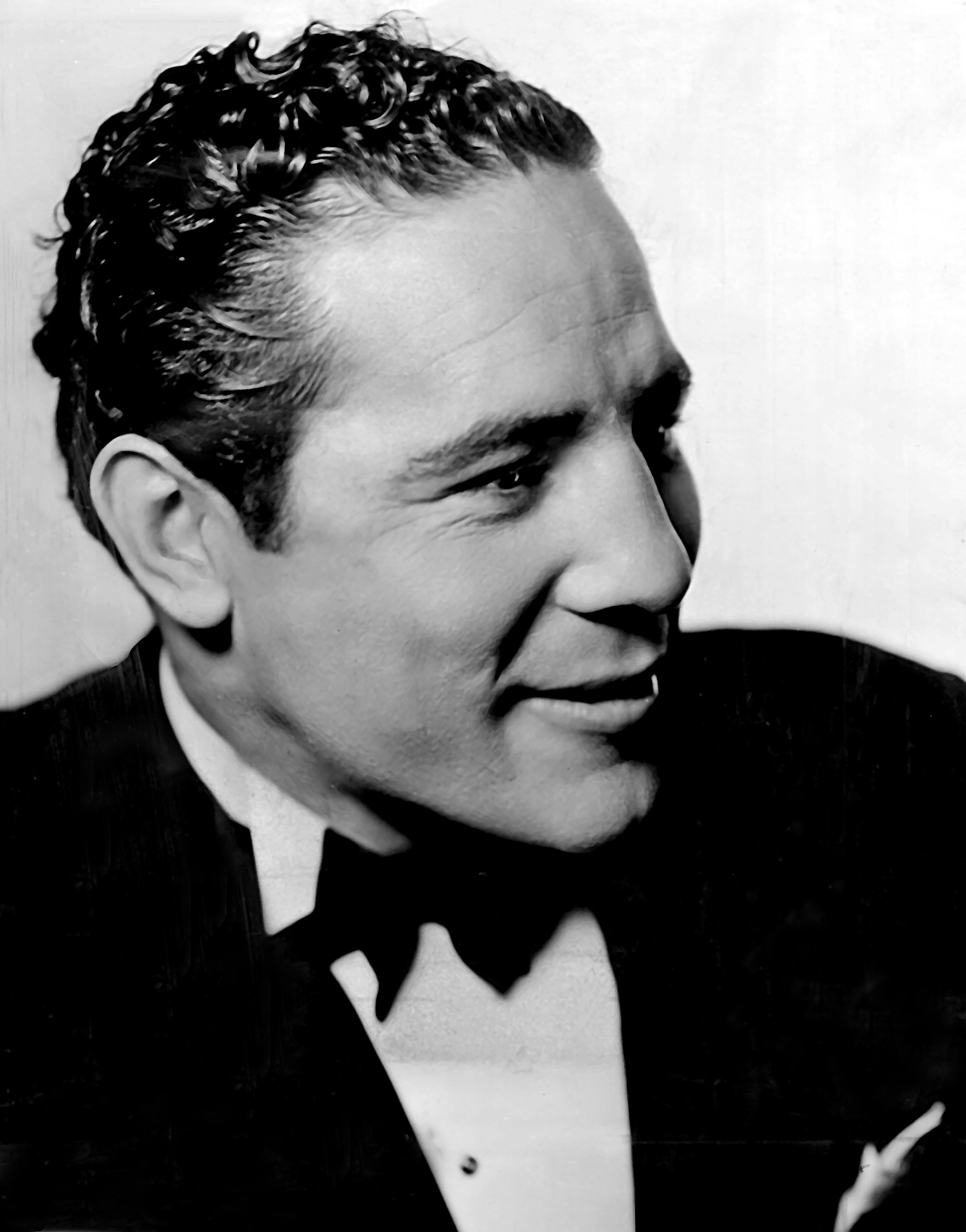
- Baer c. 1935

Personal information
- Nicknames: The Livermore Larupper; Madcap Maxie
- Nationality: American
- Born: Maximilian Adelbert Baer; February 11, 1909 Omaha, Nebraska, U.S.
- Died: November 21, 1959 (aged 50) Hollywood, California, U.S.
- Resting place: St. Mary's Catholic Cemetery, Sacramento, California, U.S. 38.5254°N 121.42700°W
- Height: 6 ft 2 1/2 in (1.89 m)
- Weight: Heavyweight
- Children: 3, including Max Jr.

Boxing career
- Reach: 81 in (206 cm)
- Stance: Orthodox

Boxing record
- Total fights: 81
- Wins: 68
- Win by KO: 51
- Losses: 13

Maximilian Adelbert Baer Sr. (February 11, 1909 – November 21, 1959) was an American professional boxer and the world heavyweight champion from June 14, 1934, to June 13, 1935. He was known in his time as the Livermore Larupper and Madcap Maxie. Two of his fights (a 1933 win over Max Schmeling and a 1935 loss to James J. Braddock) were rated Fight of the Year by The Ring magazine. Baer was also a boxing referee, and had occasional roles in film and television. He was the brother of heavyweight boxing contender Buddy Baer and father of actor Max Baer Jr. Baer is rated #22 on The Ring magazine's list of 100 greatest punchers of all time.

== Early life ==
Baer was born on February 11, 1909, in Omaha, Nebraska, to Jacob Baer (1875–1938) and Dora Bales (1877–1938). His father was the son of Jewish immigrants from Alsace-Lorraine and his mother was of Scottish Protestant descent. His elder sister was Frances May Baer (1905–1991), his younger sister was Bernice Jeanette Baer (1911–1987), his younger brother was boxer-turned-actor Jacob Henry Baer, better known as Buddy Baer (1915–1986), and his adopted brother was August "Augie" Baer.

Baer moved to Livermore, California, with his family as a child. He attended high school only one year, quitting to work in his father's butcher shop. Livermore was ranch and cowboy country, surrounded by tens of thousands of acres of open land on which large cattle herds grazed and provided fresh meat to the local area. In 1928, Jacob leased the Twin Oaks Ranch in Murray Township, where he raised more than 2,000 hogs and worked with daughter Frances' husband, Louis Santucci. Baer often credited his work carrying heavy carcasses of meat, stunning cattle with one blow, and working at a gravel pit for the development of his powerful shoulders (an article in the January 1939 edition of Family Circle magazine reported that Baer also took the Charles Atlas exercise course.) By age eighteen, Baer stood 6 feet tall and weighed 190 pounds.

== Professional boxing career ==
Baer turned professional in 1929, progressing steadily through the Pacific Coast ranks. His career was not without setbacks; in 1930 he lost a decision to seasoned heavyweight Les Kennedy in Los Angeles. Even so, Baer built a strong record and scored victories over several more experienced fighters. His growing popularity stemmed largely from his aggressive fighting style. Although he lacked refined technical skills, he compensated with relentless offense, repeatedly charging his opponents and wearing them down with powerful punches. As a result, many of his matches ended in knockouts.

=== Frankie Campbell ===
Baer fought Frankie Campbell on August 25, 1930, at San Francisco's Recreation Park for the unofficial title of Pacific Coast champion. In the second round, Campbell clipped Baer and Baer slipped to the canvas. Campbell went toward his corner and waved to the crowd, thinking that Baer was getting the count. In response, Baer got up and flew at Campbell, landing a right to Campbell's turned head which sent him to the canvas.

After the round, Campbell said to his trainer "Something feels like it snapped in my head", but he went on to handily win rounds 3 and 4. As Baer rose for the 5th round, Tillie "Kid" Herman, Baer's former friend and trainer, who had switched camps overnight and was now in Campbell's corner, savagely taunted and jeered Baer. In a rage and determined to end the bout with a knockout, Baer soon had Campbell against the ropes. As he hammered him with punch after punch, the ropes were the only thing holding Campbell up. By the time referee Toby Irwin stopped the fight, Campbell collapsed to the canvas. Baer's own seconds reportedly ministered to Campbell, and Baer stayed by his side until an ambulance arrived 30 minutes later. Baer "visited the stricken fighter's bedside", where he offered Frankie's wife Ellie the hand that hit her husband. She took that hand and the two stood speechless for a moment. "It was unfortunate, I'm awfully sorry", said Baer. "It could have been you," she replied. She forgave him.

At noon the next day, with a lit candle laced between his crossed fingers, and his wife and mother beside him, Frankie Campbell was pronounced dead. Upon the surgeon's announcement of Campbell's death, Baer broke down and sobbed inconsolably. Brain specialist Dr. Tilton E. Tillman "declared death had been caused by a succession of blows on the jaw and not by any struck on the rear of the head" and that Campbell's brain had been "knocked completely loose from his skull" by Baer's blows.

In 1930, Baer was charged with manslaughter. He was ultimately cleared of criminal charges, but the California State Athletic Commission suspended him from boxing in the state for one year. Following Campbell's death, Baer stepped away from boxing for several months. Upon returning, he lost four of his next six bouts, in part due to a hesitancy to press the attack. One of those victories came at the hands of future Hall of Famer Tommy Loughran, who observed that Baer was looping and telegraphing his punches. Former heavyweight champion Jack Dempsey later worked with Baer to shorten his punches and remained interested in his development throughout the rest of his career.

=== Ernie Schaaf ===
The Campbell incident earned Baer the reputation as a "killer" in the ring. This publicity was further sensationalized by Baer's return bout with Ernie Schaaf, on August 31, 1932. Schaaf had bested Baer in a decision during Max's Eastern debut bout at Madison Square Garden on September 19, 1930.

An Associated Press article in the September 9, 1932, sports section of the New York Times describes the end of the return bout as follows:

Two seconds before the fight ended Schaaf was knocked flat on his face, completely knocked out. He was dragged to his corner and his seconds worked on him for three minutes before restoring him to his senses... Baer smashed a heavy right to the jaw that shook Schaaf to his heels, to start the last round, then walked into the Boston fighter, throwing both hands to the head and body. Baer drove three hard rights to the jaw that staggered Schaaf. Baer beat Schaaf around the ring and into the ropes with a savage attack to the head and body. Just before the round ended Baer dropped Schaaf to the canvas, but the bell sounded as Schaaf hit the floor.

Schaaf complained frequently of headaches after that bout. Five months after the Baer fight, on February 11, 1933, Schaaf died in the ring after taking a left jab from the Italian fighter Primo Carnera. The majority of sports editors noted, however, that an autopsy later revealed Schaaf had meningitis, a swelling of the brain, and was still recovering from a severe case of influenza when he touched gloves with Carnera. Schaaf's obituary stated that "just before his bout with Carnera, Schaaf went into reclusion in a religious retreat near Boston to recuperate from an attack of influenza" which produced the meningitis. The death of Campbell and accusations over Schaaf's demise profoundly affected Baer, even though he was ostensibly indestructible and remained a devastating force in the ring. According to his son, actor/director Max Baer Jr. (who was born seven years after the incident):

My father cried about what happened to Frankie Campbell. He had nightmares. In reality, my father was one of the kindest and most gentle men you could ever hope to meet. He treated boxing the way today's professional wrestlers do wrestling: part sport, mostly showmanship. He never deliberately hurt anyone.

=== Max Schmeling ===
Boxing has found in Max Baer the kind of fighter who can bring the game back to the old days—the days when big men fought to knock each other out...So I believe that boxing's comeback now rests right on Baer's shoulders. He is only 24 years old, he's the biggest, strongest man fighting today, and he hits with terrible power.

— Jack Dempsey,
former world heavyweight champion

On June 8, 1933, Baer fought and defeated German heavyweight and former world champion Max Schmeling at Yankee Stadium, by technical knockout. Schmeling was favored to win and was Adolf Hitler's favorite boxer. The Nazi tabloid Der Stürmer publicly attacked Schmeling for fighting a non-Aryan, as Baer's father was Jewish, calling it a "racial and cultural disgrace."

Although the Great Depression, then in full force, had lowered the income of most citizens, sixty thousand people attended the boxing match. NBC radio updated millions nationwide as the match progressed. Baer, who was of one-quarter Jewish descent, wore trunks which displayed a large Star of David. He wore this symbol in all his future bouts. During the match, he dominated the rugged Schmeling into the tenth round, when Baer knocked Schmeling down and the referee stopped the match. Columnist Westbrook Pegler wrote about Schmeling's loss, "That wasn't a defeat, that was a disaster", while journalist David Margolick claimed that Baer's victory would come to "symbolize Jewry's struggle against the Nazis." Baer became a hero among Jews and those who despised the Nazis.

Film star Greta Garbo considered Baer's defeat of Schmeling to be a "mini victory" over Nazism, and she invited Baer to visit her while she was filming Queen Christina in Hollywood. However, Baer's presence on the set was considered a "sacrilege" in Hollywood, as even MGM studio's head, Louis B. Mayer, wasn't allowed on Garbo's set, since she demanded total privacy while acting. Their friendship led to a romance, which lasted until he returned to New York to train for his next match against Primo Carnera.

=== World Heavyweight Champion ===
On June 14, 1934, at the outdoor Madison Square Garden Bowl at Long Island City, New York, Baer defeated the huge reigning world champion Primo Carnera of Italy, who weighed in at 267 pounds and was older. Baer knocked down the champion 11 times before the fight was stopped in the eleventh round by referee Arthur Donovan to save Carnera from further punishment. All the knockdowns occurred in rounds one, two, ten and eleven, which Baer thoroughly dominated. The intervening rounds were competitive. There is some dispute about the number of knockdowns scored, as Carnera slipped to the canvas on several occasions and was wrestled to the canvas other times. In this match, Carnera couldn't stand, he couldn't dodge, or throw powerful punches because, since round one, a severe pain in his ankle had left him unsteady. After the fight with Baer, doctors at Columbus Hospital discovered that Carnera had a fractured foot. Despite this dominant performance over Carnera, Baer would hold the world heavyweight title for just 364 days.

==== James J. Braddock ====
On June 13, 1935, one of the greatest upsets in boxing history occurred at the Madison Square Garden Bowl, as Baer fought down-and-out boxer James J. Braddock in the so-called Cinderella Man bout. Baer hardly trained for the bout. Braddock, on the other hand, trained hard. "I'm training for a fight, not a boxing contest or a clownin' contest or a dance," he said. "Whether it goes one round or three rounds or ten rounds, it will be a fight and a fight all the way. When you've been through what I've had to face in the last two years, a Max Baer or a Bengal tiger looks like a house pet. He might come at me with a cannon and a blackjack and he would still be a picnic compared to what I've had to face." Baer, ever the showman, "brought gales of laughter from the crowd with his antics" the night he stepped between the ropes to meet Braddock. As Braddock "slipped the blue bathrobe from his pink back, he was the sentimental favorite of a Bowl crowd of 30,000, most of whom had bet their money 8-to-1 against him."

Baer "undoubtedly paid the penalty for underestimating his challenger beforehand and wasting too much time clowning." Braddock took heavy hits from Baer but kept coming at him until he wore Max down. At the end of 15 rounds Braddock emerged the victor in a unanimous decision, outpointing Baer 8 rounds to 6 in the "most astounding upset since John L. Sullivan went down before the thrusts of Gentleman Jim Corbett back in the nineties."

The fight was featured in the 2005 film Cinderella Man. Baer was portrayed by Craig Bierko and Braddock was portrayed by Russell Crowe.

=== Decline and retirement ===
Baer and his brother Buddy both lost fights to Joe Louis. In the third round of Max's September 1935 match, Louis knocked Baer down twice, the first time he had ever been knocked to the canvas in his career. A sizzling left hook in the fourth round brought Max to his knee again, and the referee called the bout soon after. It was learned weeks later that Baer fought Louis with a broken right hand that never healed from his fight with James J. Braddock. Max was virtually helpless without his big right hand in the Louis fight. In the first televised heavyweight prizefight, Baer lost to Lou Nova on June 1, 1939, on WNBT-TV in New York.

==== White Heavyweight Champ ====
Baer was awarded a belt declaring him the "White Heavyweight Champion of the World" after he scored a first-round TKO over Pat Cominsky in a bout at Roosevelt Stadium in Jersey City, New Jersey, on September 26, 1940, but it was a publicity stunt. The fight was not promoted as being for the white heavyweight championship, and Cominsky would not have won the belt had he beaten Baer.

The belt was a publicity stunt dreamed up by boxing promoters who were trying to pressure promoter Mike Jacobs into giving the ex-world heavyweight champion a rematch with current champ Joe Louis. Jacobs did not give Baer another bout with Louis. Baer retired after his next fight, on April 4, 1941, when he lost to Lou Nova on a TKO in the eighth round of a scheduled 10-rounder at Madison Square Garden. Nova did get a shot at Joe Louis, losing to the champion by TKO in the sixth round of a scheduled fifteen-round bout held at the Polo Grounds in New York.

=== Career statistics ===
Baer boxed in 84 professional fights from 1929 to 1941. In all, his record was 71–13. Fifty-three of those wins were knockouts, making him a member of the exclusive group of boxers to have won 50 or more bouts by knockout. Baer defeated the likes of Ernie Schaaf, Walter Cobb, Kingfish Levinsky, Max Schmeling, Tony Galento, Ben Foord and Tommy Farr. He was Heavyweight Champion of the World from June 14, 1934, to June 13, 1935.

Baer was a 1968 inductee into The Ring magazine's Boxing Hall of Fame (disbanded in 1987) and was inducted to the International Boxing Hall of Fame in 1995. He was inducted to the International Jewish Sports Hall of Fame in 2009. The 1998 Holiday Issue of Ring ranked Baer #20 in "The 50 Greatest Heavyweights of All Time". In Ring Magazine's 100 Greatest Punchers (published in 2003), Baer is ranked number 22.

== Boxing style ==
Baer was known as for his aggressive, charismatic and clowning style. However, it is widely considered that he became less aggressive after he was charged with manslaughter when Frankie Campbell died in a bout with Baer.

He was a slugger with significant knockout power. His right hand is often considered one of the hardest hitting in heavyweight history. Baer is also known for his use of the cross-armed guard, also used by future heavyweight sluggers such as George Foreman.

== Acting ==
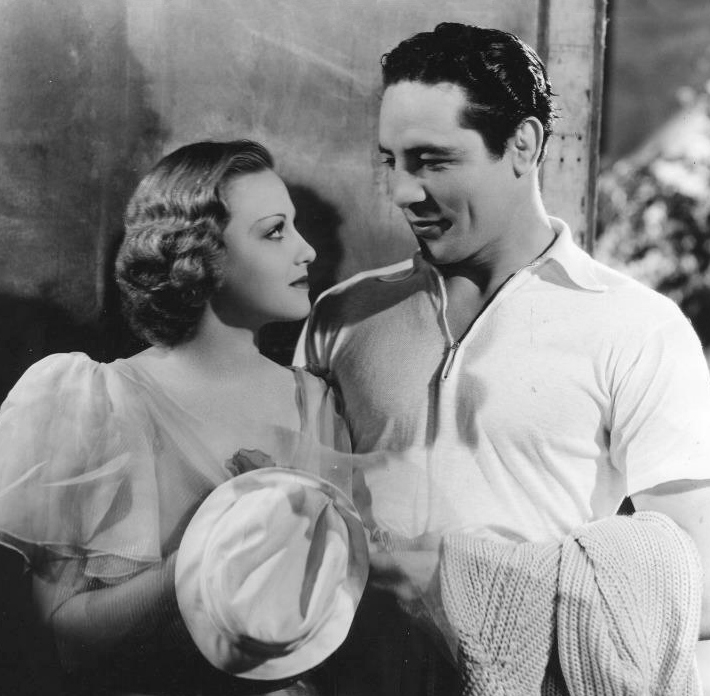
Baer and Jean Howard in The Prizefighter and the Lady

Baer's motion picture debut was in The Prizefighter and the Lady (1933) opposite Myrna Loy and Walter Huston. In this MGM movie he played Steven "Steve" Morgan, a bartender that the Professor, played by Huston, begins training for the ring. Steve wins a fight, then marries Belle Mercer, played by Loy. He starts seriously training, but it turns out he has a huge ego and an eye for women. Featured were Baer's upcoming opponent, Primo Carnera, as himself, whom Steve challenges for the championship, and Jack Dempsey, as himself, former heavyweight champion, acting as the referee.

On March 29, 1934, The Prizefighter and the Lady was officially banned in Germany at the behest of Joseph Goebbels, Adolf Hitler's Minister of Propaganda and Public Entertainment, even though it received favorable reviews in local newspapers as well as in Nazi publications. When contacted for comment at Lake Tahoe, Baer said, "They didn't ban the picture because I have Jewish blood. They banned it because I knocked out Max Schmeling." Baer, along with his brother Buddy, enlisted in the U.S. Army Air Force when World War II began.

Baer acted in almost 20 movies, including Africa Screams (1949) with Abbott and Costello, and made several television guest appearances. A clown in and out of the ring, Baer also appeared in a vaudeville act and on his own TV variety show. Baer appeared in Humphrey Bogart's final movie, The Harder They Fall (1956), opposite Mike Lane as Toro Moreno, a Hollywood version of Primo Carnera, whom Baer defeated for his heavyweight title. Budd Schulberg, who wrote the book on which the movie was based, portrayed the Baer character, "Buddy Brannen", as bloodthirsty, and the unfounded characterization was reprised in the movie Cinderella Man.

In 1950, Baer teamed up with another titleholder, friend and Light Heavyweight champion (1929–34) and boxer-turned actor/comedian, Maxie Rosenbloom. Together, the two starred in four slapstick comedy shorts for Columbia Pictures (produced by the makers of the Three Stooges comedies) and one feature film, Skipalong Rosenbloom (written by Rosenbloom, uncredited). The team embarked on a comedy tour, billed as "The Two Maxie's". Baer would also take the stage at Rosenbloom's comedy club on Wilshire Blvd, Slapsy Maxie's, which was featured in the film Gangster Squad. Baer and Rosenbloom remained friends until Baer's death in 1959.

Baer additionally worked as a disc jockey for a Sacramento radio station, and for a while he was a wrestler. He served as public relations director for a Sacramento automobile dealership and referee for boxing and wrestling matches.

== Family ==
Baer was married twice, first to actress Dorothy Dunbar (married July 8, 1931 – divorced October 3, 1933) and then to Mary Ellen Sullivan (1903–1978) (married June 29, 1935 – his death 1959), the mother of their three children: actor Max Baer Jr. (b. 1937), best known for playing Jethro Bodine on The Beverly Hillbillies, James Manny Baer (1941–2009), and Maudie Marian Baer (b. 1944).

At the time of his death on November 21, 1959, Baer was scheduled to appear in some TV commercials in Los Angeles before returning to his home in Sacramento.

== Death ==
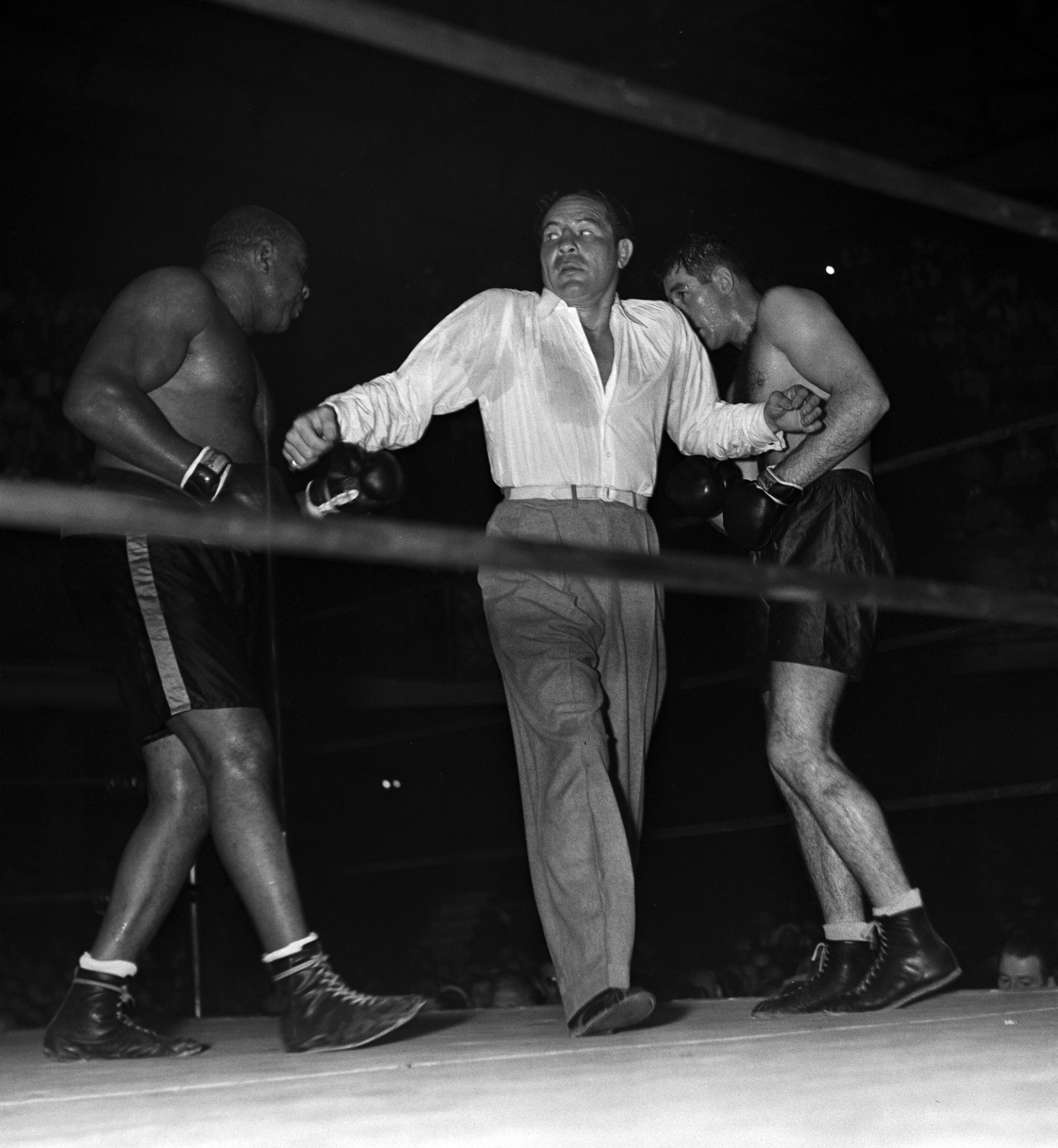
Baer refereeing a match between George Godfrey (left) and Hank Hankinson, 1937

On Wednesday, November 18, 1959, Baer refereed a nationally televised 10-round boxing match in Phoenix. At the end of the match, to the applause of the crowd, Baer grasped the ropes and vaulted out of the ring and joined fight fans in a cocktail bar. The next day, he was scheduled to appear in several television commercials in Hollywood, California. On his way, he stopped in Garden Grove, California, to keep a promise he had made thirteen years earlier to the then five-year-old son of his ex-sparring partner, Curly Owens. Baer presented the then 18-year-old with a foreign sports car on his birthday, as he had said he would.

Baer checked into the Hollywood Roosevelt Hotel upon his arrival on November 19. Hotel employees said he looked fit but complained of a cold. As he was shaving on the morning of November 21, he experienced chest pains. He called the front desk and asked for a doctor. The desk clerk said that "a house doctor would be right up." "A house doctor?" he replied jokingly, "No, dummy, I need a people doctor".

A doctor gave Baer medicine, and a fire department rescue squad administered oxygen. His chest pains subsided and he was showing signs of recovery when he was stricken with a second heart attack. Just a moment before, he was joking with the doctor, declaring he had come through two similar but lighter attacks earlier in Sacramento, California. Then he slumped on his left side, turned blue and died within a matter of minutes. His last words reportedly were, "Oh God, here I go."

Baer's funeral in Sacramento was attended by more than 1,500 mourners. Four former world boxing champions appeared and Joe Louis and Jack Dempsey were among the pallbearers. The cemetery service was concluded by an American Legion honor guard recognizing Baer's service in World War II. Baer's obituary made the front page of The New York Times. He was laid to rest in a garden crypt in St. Mary's Catholic Cemetery in Sacramento.

== Legacy ==
There is a park named for Baer in Livermore, California. There is also a park named for him in Sacramento.

Baer was inducted into The Ring magazine Hall of Fame in 1968, the World Boxing Hall of Fame in 1984, the Bay Area Sports Hall of Fame in 1988, the International Boxing Hall of Fame in 1995, and the International Jewish Sports Hall of Fame in 2010.

Baer was an active member of the Fraternal Order of Eagles. When he died of a heart attack in 1959, the Eagles created a charity fund as a tribute to his memory and as a means of combating the disease that killed him. The Max Baer Heart Fund is primarily to aid in heart research and education. Since the fund started in 1959, millions of dollars have been donated to universities, medical centers and hospitals across the United States and Canada for heart research and education.

== Selected filmography ==
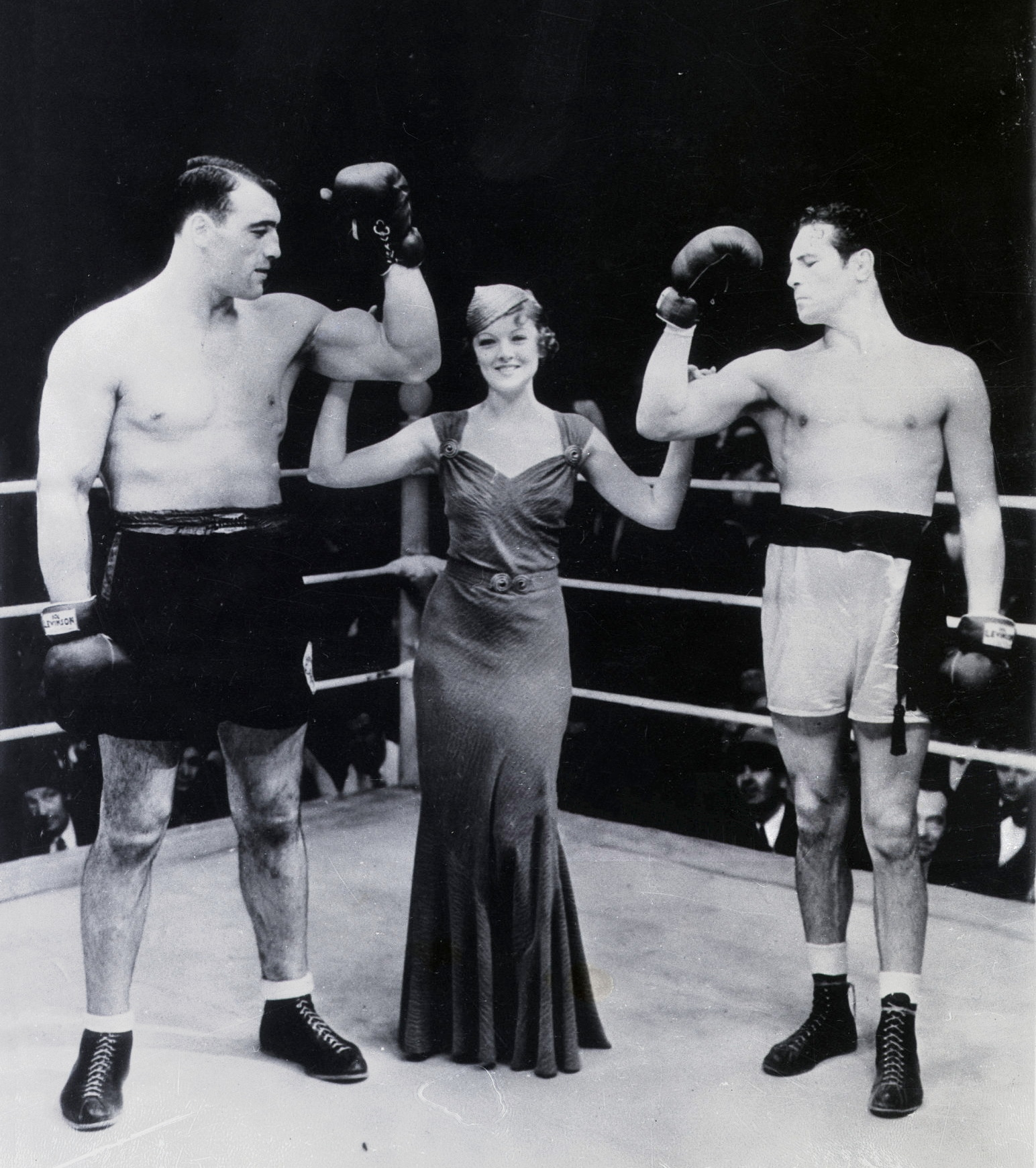
Carnera, Loy and Baer in The Prizefighter and the Lady

- The Prizefighter and the Lady (1933, co-starring Myrna Loy) as Morgan
- Max Baer vs. Max Schmeling (1933) as Himself
- World's Heavyweight Championship: Primo Carnera and Max Baer (1934) as Himself
- Kids on the Cuff (1935)
- Joe Louis vs. Jack Sharkey (1936) as Himself
- Over She Goes (1938, a musical comedy) as Silas Morner
- Fisticuffs (1938, Short, a Pete Smith specialty short for MGM Studios) as Himself
- The Navy Comes Through (1942, starring Pat O'Brien) as Coxswain G. Berringer
- The McGuerins from Brooklyn (1942) as Professor Samson
- Ladies' Day (1943, a baseball comedy starring Lupe Vélez) as Hippo Jones
- Buckskin Frontier (1943, a 19th-century western saga with Richard Dix) as Tiny
- Africa Screams (1949, with his brother, Buddy, a comedy with Abbott and Costello) as Grappler McCoy
- Bride for Sale (1949) as Litka
- Riding High (1950) as Bertie (uncredited)
- Skipalong Rosenbloom (1951) as Butcher Baer
- Rocky Marciano vs. Archie Moore (1955) as Himself - Guest
- The Harder They Fall (1956, starring Humphrey Bogart) as Buddy Brannen
- Utah Blaine (1957, with Rory Calhoun in the title role) as Gus Ortmann
- Once Upon a Horse... (1958) as Ben (final film role)

Portrayed in:

- Cinderella Man (2005) – portrayed by Craig Bierko
- Carnera: The Walking Mountain (2008) by Antonio Cupo

== TV guest appearances ==
- Playhouse 90 (10/11/1956) (Screen Gems TV, CBS) ... Mike ... episode: Requiem for a Heavyweight
- Abbott and Costello Show (12/12/1953) ... Killer ... episode: Killer's Wife
- Make Room For Daddy (2/3/1958) ... Himself ... episode: Rusty The Bully

== Professional boxing record ==
All information in this section is derived from BoxRec, unless otherwise stated.

=== Official record ===
81 fights	66 wins	13 losses
By knockout	51	3
By decision	15	8
By disqualification	0	2
Newspaper decisions/draws	2	

All newspaper decisions are officially regarded as "no decision" bouts and are not counted in the win/loss/draw column.

No.	Result	Record	Opponent	Type	Round, time	Date	Location	Notes
81	Loss	66–13 (2)	Lou Nova	TKO	8 (10), 2:18	April 4, 1941	Madison Square Garden, New York City, New York, U.S.	
80	Win	66–12 (2)	Pat Comiskey	TKO	1 (10), 2:39	September 26, 1940	Roosevelt Stadium, Jersey City, New Jersey, U.S.	
79	Win	65–12 (2)	Tony Galento	RTD	7 (15)	July 2, 1940	Roosevelt Stadium, Jersey City, New Jersey, U.S.	
78	Win	64–12 (2)	Babe Ritchie	KO	2 (10), 1:10	September 18, 1939	Fair Park Stadium, Lubbock, Texas, U.S.	
77	Win	63–12 (2)	Big Ed Murphy	KO	1 (4), 1:40	September 4, 1939	Silver Peak, Nevada, U.S.	
76	Loss	62–12 (2)	Lou Nova	TKO	11 (12), 1:21	June 1, 1939	Yankee Stadium, Bronx, New York, U.S.	
75	Win	62–11 (2)	Hank Hankinson	KO	1 (10), 0:48	October 26, 1938	Civic Auditorium, Honolulu, Hawaii, U.S.	
74	Win	61–11 (2)	Tommy Farr	UD	15	March 11, 1938	Madison Square Garden, New York City, New York, U.S.	
73	Win	60–11 (2)	Ben Foord	TKO	9 (10)	May 27, 1937	Harringay Arena, London, England	
72	Loss	59–11 (2)	Tommy Farr	PTS	12	April 15, 1937	Harringay Arena, London, England	
71	Win	59–10 (2)	Dutch Weimer	KO	2 (10), 1:30	October 19, 1936	Maple Leaf Gardens, Toronto, Ontario, Canada	
70	Loss	58–10 (2)	Willie Davies	PTS	6	October 8, 1936	Platteville, Wisconsin, U.S.	
69	Win	58–9 (2)	Tim Charles	KO	4 (6)	October 6, 1936	Coliseum, Evansville, Illinois, U.S.	
68	Win	57–9 (2)	Andy Miller	NWS	6	September 21, 1936	Sheldon, Iowa, Iowa, U.S.	
67	Win	57–9 (1)	Bearcat Wright	NWS	6	September 14, 1936	Des Moines Coliseum, Des Moines, Iowa, U.S.	
66	Win	57–9	Cowboy Sammy Evans	KO	3 (6)	September 7, 1936	Elks Hall, Casper, Wyoming, U.S.	
65	Win	56–9	Cyclone Lynch	KO	3 (6)	September 4, 1936	Rock Springs, Wyoming, U.S.	
64	Win	55–9	Al Gaynor	KO	1 (6)	September 2, 1936	Lincoln Field, Twin Falls, Idaho, U.S.	
63	Win	54–9	Don Baxter	KO	1 (6)	August 31, 1936	Memorial Ball Park, Coeur d'Alene, Idaho, U.S.	
62	Win	53–9	Al Frankco	KO	2 (6)	August 29, 1936	Recreation Park, Lewiston, Idaho, U.S.	
61	Win	52–9	Cecil Myart	PTS	6	August 25, 1936	Multnomah Stadium, Portland, Oregon, U.S.	
60	Win	51–9	Nails Gorman	TKO	3 (6)	August 24, 1936	Armory, Marshfield, Wisconsin, U.S.	
59	Win	50–9	Bob Williams	KO	1 (6), 3:00	July 24, 1936	Ogden Stadium, Ogden, Utah, U.S.	
58	Win	49–9	Cecil Smith	PTS	4	July 17, 1936	Convention Hall, Ada, Oklahoma, U.S.	
57	Win	48–9	Junior Munsell	KO	5 (6), 0:45	July 16, 1936	Tulsa Coliseum, Tulsa, Oklahoma, U.S.	
56	Win	47–9	James Merriott	KO	2 (6)	July 13, 1936	Avey's Open-Air Arena, Oklahoma City, Oklahoma, U.S.	
55	Win	46–9	Buck Rogers	KO	3 (6)	July 2, 1936	Sportatorium, Dallas, Texas, U.S.	
54	Win	45–9	Wilson Dunn	TKO	3 (6)	June 24, 1936	Tech Field, San Antonio, Texas, U.S.	
53	Win	44–9	George Brown	TKO	4 (6)	June 23, 1936	Tyler, Texas, U.S.	
52	Win	43–9	Harold Murphy	PTS	6	June 19, 1936	Pocatello Armory, Pocatello, Idaho, U.S.	
51	Win	42–9	Bob Fraser	TKO	2 (6)	June 17, 1936	Ada Co. Fairgrounds, Boise, Idaho, U.S.	
50	Win	41–9	Tony Souza	PTS	6	June 15, 1936	McCullough's Arena, Salt Lake City, Utah, U.S.	
49	Loss	40–9	Joe Louis	KO	4 (15), 3:09	September 24, 1935	Yankee Stadium, Bronx, New York, U.S.	
48	Loss	40–8	James J. Braddock	UD	15	June 13, 1935	Madison Square Garden Bowl, Long Island City, New York, U.S.	Lost NYSAC, NBA, and The Ring heavyweight titles
47	Win	40–7	Primo Carnera	TKO	11 (15), 2:16	June 14, 1934	Madison Square Garden Bowl, Long Island City, New York, U.S.	Won NYSAC, NBA, and The Ring heavyweight titles
46	Win	39–7	Max Schmeling	TKO	10 (15), 1:51	June 8, 1933	Yankee Stadium, Bronx, New York, U.S.	
45	Win	38–7	Tuffy Griffiths	TKO	7 (10), 0:58	September 26, 1932	Chicago Stadium, Chicago, Illinois, U.S.	
44	Win	37–7	Ernie Schaaf	MD	10	August 31, 1932	Chicago Stadium, Chicago, Illinois, U.S.	
43	Win	36–7	King Levinsky	PTS	20	July 4, 1932	Dempsey's Bowl, Reno, Nevada, U.S.	
42	Win	35–7	Walter Cobb	TKO	4 (10)	May 11, 1932	Oakland Civic Auditorium, Oakland, California, U.S.	
41	Win	34–7	Paul Swiderski	TKO	6 (10)	April 26, 1932	Olympic Auditorium, Los Angeles, California, U.S.	
40	Win	33–7	Tom Heeney	PTS	10	February 22, 1932	Seals Stadium, San Francisco, California, U.S.	
39	Win	32–7	King Levinsky	UD	10	January 29, 1932	Madison Square Garden, New York City, New York, U.S.	
38	Win	31–7	Arthur De Kuh	PTS	10	December 30, 1931	Oakland Civic Auditorium, Oakland, California, U.S.	
37	Win	30–7	Les Kennedy	KO	3 (10)	November 23, 1931	Oakland Civic Auditorium, Oakland, California, U.S.	
36	Win	29–7	Johnny Risko	PTS	10	November 9, 1931	Seals Stadium, San Francisco, California, U.S.	
35	Win	28–7	Santa Camarão	KO	10 (10)	October 21, 1931	Oakland Civic Auditorium, Oakland, California, U.S.	
34	Win	27–7	Jack Van Noy	TKO	8 (10)	September 23, 1931	Oakland Civic Auditorium, Oakland, California, U.S.	
33	Loss	26–7	Paulino Uzcudun	PTS	20	July 4, 1931	Race Track Arena, Reno, Nevada, U.S.	
32	Loss	26–6	Johnny Risko	UD	10	May 5, 1931	Public Hall, Cleveland, Ohio, U.S.	
31	Win	26–5	Ernie Owens	KO	2 (10)	April 7, 1931	Keller Auditorium, Portland, Oregon, U.S.	
30	Loss	25–5	Tommy Loughran	UD	10	February 6, 1931	Madison Square Garden, New York City, New York, U.S.	
29	Win	25–4	Tom Heeney	KO	3 (10)	January 16, 1931	Madison Square Garden, New York City, New York, U.S.	
28	Loss	24–4	Ernie Schaaf	UD	10	December 19, 1930	Madison Square Garden, New York City, New York, U.S.	
27	Win	24–3	Frankie Campbell	TKO	5 (10)	August 25, 1930	Recreation Park, San Francisco, California, U.S.	Campbell died of injuries sustained from the fight.
26	Win	23–3	KO Christner	KO	2 (10)	August 11, 1930	Oaks Ballpark, Emeryville, California, U.S.	
25	Loss	22–3	Les Kennedy	PTS	10	July 15, 1930	Olympic Auditorium, Los Angeles, California, U.S.	
24	Win	22–2	Ernie Owens	KO	5 (10)	June 25, 1930	Oakland Civic Auditorium, Oakland, California, U.S.	
23	Win	21–2	Buck Weaver	KO	1 (10)	June 11, 1930	Oakland Civic Auditorium, Oakland, California, U.S.	
22	Win	20–2	Jack Linkhorn	KO	1 (10)	May 28, 1930	Oakland Civic Auditorium, Oakland, California, U.S.	
21	Win	19–2	Tom Toner	TKO	6 (10)	May 7, 1930	Oakland Civic Auditorium, Oakland, California, U.S.	
20	Win	18–2	Ernie Owens	PTS	10	April 22, 1930	Olympic Auditorium, Los Angeles, California, U.S.	
19	Win	17–2	Jack Stewart	KO	2 (10)	April 9, 1930	Oakland Civic Auditorium, Oakland, California, U.S.	
18	Win	16–2	Tiny Abbott	KO	6 (10)	January 29, 1930	Auditorium, Oakland, California, U.S.	
17	Loss	15–2	Tiny Abbott	DQ	3 (10)	January 15, 1930	Arcadia Pavilion, Oakland, California, U.S.	
16	Win	15–1	Tony Fuente	KO	1 (10)	December 30, 1929	Arcadia Pavilion, Oakland, California, U.S.	
15	Win	14–1	Chet Shandel	KO	2 (10)	December 4, 1929	Arcadia Pavilion, Oakland, California, U.S.	
14	Win	13–1	Tillie Taverna	KO	2 (10)	November 20, 1929	Arcadia Pavilion, Oakland, California, U.S.	
13	Win	12–1	Natie Brown	PTS	6	November 6, 1929	Arcadia Pavilion, Oakland, California, U.S.	
12	Win	11–1	Alex Rowe	KO	1 (6)	October 30, 1929	Arcadia Pavilion, Oakland, California, U.S.	
11	Win	10–1	Chief Caribou	TKO	1 (6)	October 16, 1929	Arcadia Pavilion, Oakland, California, U.S.	
10	Win	9–1	George Carroll	TKO	1 (6)	October 2, 1929	Arcadia Pavilion, Oakland, California, U.S.	
9	Win	8–1	Frank Rudzenski	KO	3 (6)	September 25, 1929	Arcadia Pavilion, Oakland, California, U.S.	
8	Loss	7–1	Jack McCarthy	DQ	3 (6)	September 4, 1929	Arcadia Pavilion, Oakland, California, U.S.	
7	Win	7–0	Al Red Ledford	KO	2 (6)	August 8, 1929	Arcadia Pavilion, Oakland, California, U.S.	
6	Win	6–0	Benny Hill	PTS	4	July 31, 1929	Arcadia Pavilion, Oakland, California, U.S.	
5	Win	5–0	Benny Hill	PTS	4	July 24, 1929	Arcadia Pavilion, Oakland, California, U.S.	
4	Win	4–0	Al Red Ledford	KO	1 (4), 2:02	July 18, 1929	Oak Park Arena, Stockton, California, U.S.	
3	Win	3–0	Tillie Taverna	KO	1 (4), 2:01	July 4, 1929	Oak Park Arena, Stockton, California, U.S.	
2	Win	2–0	Sailor Leeds	TKO	1 (4), 1:30	June 6, 1929	Oak Park Arena, Stockton, California, U.S.	
1	Win	1–0	Chief Caribou	TKO	2 (4)	May 16, 1929	Oak Park Arena, Stockton, California, U.S.	

=== Unofficial record ===
81 fights	68 wins	13 losses
By knockout	51	3
By decision	17	8
By disqualification	0	2

Record with the inclusion of newspaper decisions in the win/loss/draw column.

No.	Result	Record	Opponent	Type	Round, time	Date	Location	Notes
81	Loss	68–13	Lou Nova	TKO	8 (10), 2:18	Apr 4, 1941	Madison Square Garden, New York City, New York, U.S.	
80	Win	68–12	Pat Comiskey	TKO	1 (10), 2:39	Sep 26, 1940	Roosevelt Stadium, Jersey City, New Jersey, U.S.	
79	Win	67–12	Tony Galento	RTD	7 (15)	Jul 2, 1940	Roosevelt Stadium, Jersey City, New Jersey, U.S.	
78	Win	66–12	Babe Ritchie	KO	2 (10), 1:10	Sep 18, 1939	Fair Park Stadium, Lubbock, Texas, U.S.	
77	Win	65–12	Big Ed Murphy	KO	1 (4), 1:40	Sep 4, 1939	Silver Peak, Nevada, U.S.	
76	Loss	64–12	Lou Nova	TKO	11 (12), 1:21	Jun 1, 1939	Yankee Stadium, Bronx, New York, U.S.	
75	Win	64–11	Hank Hankinson	KO	1 (10), 0:48	Oct 26, 1938	Civic Auditorium, Honolulu, Hawaii, U.S.	
74	Win	63–11	Tommy Farr	UD	15	Mar 11, 1938	Madison Square Garden, New York City, New York, U.S.	
73	Win	62–11	Ben Foord	TKO	9 (10)	May 27, 1937	Harringay Arena, London, England	
72	Loss	61–11	Tommy Farr	PTS	12	Apr 15, 1937	Harringay Arena, London, England	
71	Win	61–10	Dutch Weimer	KO	2 (10), 1:30	Oct 19, 1936	Maple Leaf Gardens, Toronto, Ontario, Canada	
70	Loss	60–10	Willie Davies	PTS	6	Oct 8, 1936	Platteville, Wisconsin, U.S.	
69	Win	60–9	Tim Charles	KO	4 (6)	Oct 6, 1936	Coliseum, Evansville, Illinois, U.S.	
68	Win	59–9	Andy Miller	NWS	6	Sep 21, 1936	Sheldon, Iowa, Iowa, U.S.	
67	Win	58–9	Bearcat Wright	NWS	6	Sep 14, 1936	Des Moines Coliseum, Des Moines, Iowa, U.S.	
66	Win	57–9	Cowboy Sammy Evans	KO	3 (6)	Sep 7, 1936	Elks Hall, Casper, Wyoming, U.S.	
65	Win	56–9	Cyclone Lynch	KO	3 (6)	Sep 4, 1936	Rock Springs, Wyoming, U.S.	
64	Win	55–9	Al Gaynor	KO	1 (6)	Sep 2, 1936	Lincoln Field, Twin Falls, Idaho, U.S.	
63	Win	54–9	Don Baxter	KO	1 (6)	Aug 31, 1936	Memorial Ball Park, Coeur d'Alene, Idaho, U.S.	
62	Win	53–9	Al Frankco	KO	2 (6)	Aug 29, 1936	Recreation Park, Lewiston, Idaho, U.S.	
61	Win	52–9	Cecil Myart	PTS	6	Aug 25, 1936	Multnomah Stadium, Portland, Oregon, U.S.	
60	Win	51–9	Nails Gorman	TKO	3 (6)	Aug 24, 1936	Armory, Marshfield, Wisconsin, U.S.	
59	Win	50–9	Bob Williams	KO	1 (6), 3:00	Jul 24, 1936	Ogden Stadium, Ogden, Utah, U.S.	
58	Win	49–9	Cecil Smith	PTS	4	Jul 17, 1936	Convention Hall, Ada, Oklahoma, U.S.	
57	Win	48–9	Junior Munsell	KO	5 (6), 0:45	Jul 16, 1936	Tulsa Coliseum, Tulsa, Oklahoma, U.S.	
56	Win	47–9	James Merriott	KO	2 (6)	Jul 13, 1936	Avey's Open-Air Arena, Oklahoma City, Oklahoma, U.S.	
55	Win	46–9	Buck Rogers	KO	3 (6)	Jul 2, 1936	Sportatorium, Dallas, Texas, U.S.	
54	Win	45–9	Wilson Dunn	TKO	3 (6)	Jun 24, 1936	Tech Field, San Antonio, Texas, U.S.	
53	Win	44–9	George Brown	TKO	4 (6)	Jun 23, 1936	Tyler, Texas, U.S.	
52	Win	43–9	Harold Murphy	PTS	6	Jun 19, 1936	Pocatello Armory, Pocatello, Idaho, U.S.	
51	Win	42–9	Bob Fraser	TKO	2 (6)	Jun 17, 1936	Ada Co. Fairgrounds, Boise, Idaho, U.S.	
50	Win	41–9	Tony Souza	PTS	6	Jun 15, 1936	McCullough's Arena, Salt Lake City, Utah, U.S.	
49	Loss	40–9	Joe Louis	KO	4 (15), 3:09	Sep 24, 1935	Yankee Stadium, Bronx, New York, U.S.	
48	Loss	40–8	James J. Braddock	UD	15	Jun 13, 1935	Madison Square Garden Bowl, Long Island City, New York, U.S.	Lost NYSAC, NBA, and The Ring heavyweight titles
47	Win	40–7	Primo Carnera	TKO	11 (15), 2:16	Jun 14, 1934	Madison Square Garden Bowl, Long Island City, New York, U.S.	Won NYSAC, NBA, and The Ring heavyweight titles
46	Win	39–7	Max Schmeling	TKO	10 (15), 1:51	Jun 8, 1933	Yankee Stadium, Bronx, New York, U.S.	
45	Win	38–7	Tuffy Griffiths	TKO	7 (10), 0:58	Sep 26, 1932	Chicago Stadium, Chicago, Illinois, U.S.	
44	Win	37–7	Ernie Schaaf	MD	10	Aug 31, 1932	Chicago Stadium, Chicago, Illinois, U.S.	
43	Win	36–7	King Levinsky	PTS	20	Jul 4, 1932	Dempsey's Bowl, Reno, Nevada, U.S.	
42	Win	35–7	Walter Cobb	TKO	4 (10)	May 11, 1932	Oakland Civic Auditorium, Oakland, California, U.S.	
41	Win	34–7	Paul Swiderski	TKO	6 (10)	Apr 26, 1932	Olympic Auditorium, Los Angeles, California, U.S.	
40	Win	33–7	Tom Heeney	PTS	10	Feb 22, 1932	Seals Stadium, San Francisco, California, U.S.	
39	Win	32–7	King Levinsky	UD	10	Jan 29, 1932	Madison Square Garden, New York City, New York, U.S.	
38	Win	31–7	Arthur De Kuh	PTS	10	Dec 30, 1931	Oakland Civic Auditorium, Oakland, California, U.S.	
37	Win	30–7	Les Kennedy	KO	3 (10)	Nov 23, 1931	Oakland Civic Auditorium, Oakland, California, U.S.	
36	Win	29–7	Johnny Risko	PTS	10	Nov 9, 1931	Seals Stadium, San Francisco, California, U.S.	
35	Win	28–7	Santa Camarão	KO	10 (10)	Oct 21, 1931	Oakland Civic Auditorium, Oakland, California, U.S.	
34	Win	27–7	Jack Van Noy	TKO	8 (10)	Sep 23, 1931	Oakland Civic Auditorium, Oakland, California, U.S.	
33	Loss	26–7	Paulino Uzcudun	PTS	20	Jul 4, 1931	Race Track Arena, Reno, Nevada, U.S.	
32	Loss	26–6	Johnny Risko	UD	10	May 5, 1931	Public Hall, Cleveland, Ohio, U.S.	
31	Win	26–5	Ernie Owens	KO	2 (10)	Apr 7, 1931	Keller Auditorium, Portland, Oregon, U.S.	
30	Loss	25–5	Tommy Loughran	UD	10	Feb 6, 1931	Madison Square Garden, New York City, New York, U.S.	
29	Win	25–4	Tom Heeney	KO	3 (10)	Jan 16, 1931	Madison Square Garden, New York City, New York, U.S.	
28	Loss	24–4	Ernie Schaaf	UD	10	Dec 19, 1930	Madison Square Garden, New York City, New York, U.S.	
27	Win	24–3	Frankie Campbell	TKO	5 (10)	Aug 25, 1930	Recreation Park, San Francisco, California, U.S.	Campbell died of injuries sustained from the fight.
26	Win	23–3	KO Christner	KO	2 (10)	Aug 11, 1930	Oaks Ballpark, Emeryville, California, U.S.	
25	Loss	22–3	Les Kennedy	PTS	10	Jul 15, 1930	Olympic Auditorium, Los Angeles, California, U.S.	
24	Win	22–2	Ernie Owens	KO	5 (10)	Jun 25, 1930	Oakland Civic Auditorium, Oakland, California, U.S.	
23	Win	21–2	Buck Weaver	KO	1 (10)	Jun 11, 1930	Oakland Civic Auditorium, Oakland, California, U.S.	
22	Win	20–2	Jack Linkhorn	KO	1 (10)	May 28, 1930	Oakland Civic Auditorium, Oakland, California, U.S.	
21	Win	19–2	Tom Toner	TKO	6 (10)	May 7, 1930	Oakland Civic Auditorium, Oakland, California, U.S.	
20	Win	18–2	Ernie Owens	PTS	10	Apr 22, 1930	Olympic Auditorium, Los Angeles, California, U.S.	
19	Win	17–2	Jack Stewart	KO	2 (10)	Apr 9, 1930	Oakland Civic Auditorium, Oakland, California, U.S.	
18	Win	16–2	Tiny Abbott	KO	6 (10)	Jan 29, 1930	Auditorium, Oakland, California, U.S.	
17	Loss	15–2	Tiny Abbott	DQ	3 (10)	Jan 15, 1930	Arcadia Pavilion, Oakland, California, U.S.	
16	Win	15–1	Tony Fuente	KO	1 (10)	Dec 30, 1929	Arcadia Pavilion, Oakland, California, U.S.	
15	Win	14–1	Chet Shandel	KO	2 (10)	Dec 4, 1929	Arcadia Pavilion, Oakland, California, U.S.	
14	Win	13–1	Tillie Taverna	KO	2 (10)	Nov 20, 1929	Arcadia Pavilion, Oakland, California, U.S.	
13	Win	12–1	Natie Brown	PTS	6	Nov 6, 1929	Arcadia Pavilion, Oakland, California, U.S.	
12	Win	11–1	Alex Rowe	KO	1 (6)	Oct 30, 1929	Arcadia Pavilion, Oakland, California, U.S.	
11	Win	10–1	Chief Caribou	TKO	1 (6)	Oct 16, 1929	Arcadia Pavilion, Oakland, California, U.S.	
10	Win	9–1	George Carroll	TKO	1 (6)	Oct 2, 1929	Arcadia Pavilion, Oakland, California, U.S.	
9	Win	8–1	Frank Rudzenski	KO	3 (6)	Sep 25, 1929	Arcadia Pavilion, Oakland, California, U.S.	
8	Loss	7–1	Jack McCarthy	DQ	3 (6)	Sep 4, 1929	Arcadia Pavilion, Oakland, California, U.S.	
7	Win	7–0	Al Red Ledford	KO	2 (6)	Aug 8, 1929	Arcadia Pavilion, Oakland, California, U.S.	
6	Win	6–0	Benny Hill	PTS	4	Jul 31, 1929	Arcadia Pavilion, Oakland, California, U.S.	
5	Win	5–0	Benny Hill	PTS	4	Jul 24, 1929	Arcadia Pavilion, Oakland, California, U.S.	
4	Win	4–0	Al Red Ledford	KO	1 (4), 2:02	Jul 18, 1929	Oak Park Arena, Stockton, California, U.S.	
3	Win	3–0	Tillie Taverna	KO	1 (4), 2:01	Jul 4, 1929	Oak Park Arena, Stockton, California, U.S.	
2	Win	2–0	Sailor Leeds	TKO	1 (4), 1:30	Jun 6, 1929	Oak Park Arena, Stockton, California, U.S.	
1	Win	1–0	Chief Caribou	TKO	2 (4)	May 16, 1929	Oak Park Arena, Stockton, California, U.S.	

== Titles in boxing ==
=== Major world titles ===
- NYSAC heavyweight champion (200+ lbs)
- NBA (WBA) heavyweight champion (200+ lbs)

=== The Ring magazine titles ===
- The Ring heavyweight champion (200+ lbs)

=== Undisputed titles ===
- Undisputed heavyweight champion

== See also ==
- List of heavyweight boxing champions
- List of select Jewish boxers

== Other sources ==
- Los Angeles Times, March 30, 1934, pg. 12, Germany Bans Film of Baer
- Los Angeles Times Magazine, Mad Max, J.R. Moehringer (Times Staff Writer), January 7, 2007
- Sussman, Jeffrey. 2016. Max Baer and Barney Ross: Jewish Heroes of Boxing. Lanham, MD: Rowman & Littlefield.

Sporting positions
World boxing titles
Preceded by Primo Carnera	NYSAC heavyweight champion June 14, 1934 – June 13, 1935	Succeeded by James J. Braddock
Preceded by Primo Carnera	NBA heavyweight champion June 14, 1934 – June 13, 1935	Succeeded by James J. Braddock
Preceded by Primo Carnera	The Ring heavyweight champion June 14, 1934 – June 13, 1935	Succeeded by James J. Braddock
Preceded by Primo Carnera	Undisputed heavyweight champion June 14, 1934 – June 13, 1935	Succeeded by James J. Braddock
Records
Preceded by Bob Fitzsimmons; Age 54	Youngest world heavyweight champion to have died Age 50; November 21, 1959 – August 31, 1969	Succeeded by Rocky Marciano; 45
