= Stanley Poreda =

American boxer

Personal information
- Nickname: Polish Giant
- Nationality: (United States) American
- Born: Stanley Poreda; January 30, 1909 Jersey City, New Jersey
- Died: November 30, 1983 (aged 74)
- Weight: Heavyweight

Boxing career
- Stance: Orthodox

Boxing record
- Total fights: 46
- Wins: 35
- Win by KO: 16
- Losses: 10
- Draws: 1
- No contests: 0

Stanley Poreda (January 30, 1909 – November 30, 1983) was an American professional heavyweight boxer from Jersey City, New Jersey. A leading heavyweight contender during the early 1930s, he recorded victories over Johnny Risko, Ernie Schaaf, Primo Carnera and Tommy Loughran. In its annual ratings for 1932, The Ring ranked Poreda third among heavyweight contenders, behind Max Schmeling and Max Baer.

Born on January 30, 1909, in Jersey City, New Jersey, Poreda was managed by Bill Reppenhagen, and trained by Joe Jennette. He was known alternately as the Jersey City Pole or the Polish Giant. He fought and sparred with many great heavyweights of the 1930s including Joe Louis, Primo Carnera, Max Baer, Max Schmeling, Tommy Loughran and Ernie Schaaf. He retired from fighting in 1935 and became a Jersey City police officer and is a member of the New Jersey Boxing Hall of Fame.

== Boxing career ==
Poreda began his professional career in 1929. He learned boxing at the Jersey City gym of former heavyweight Joe Jeanette, who helped train him early in his career.

On March 30, 1931, Poreda faced veteran heavyweight Johnny Risko at Madison Square Garden. Poreda won the bout by decision, with two judges scoring the fight for him while referee Kid McPartland favored Risko. Contemporary Associated Press coverage described Risko as Poreda's first major opponent following a long series of victories.

Poreda's standing among the heavyweights increased in 1932. In June, he defeated Ernie Schaaf by decision over ten rounds. On August 16, he won a ten-round decision over Primo Carnera at Dreamland Park in Newark, New Jersey. Two months later, Poreda defeated Tommy Loughran over ten rounds in Philadelphia. Contemporary reports described the decision as decisive and noted that the victory strengthened Poreda's claim to a heavyweight title opportunity. The Ring subsequently placed him third in its year-end heavyweight rankings for 1932.

His fortunes declined in 1933. Schaaf stopped Poreda in their rematch at Madison Square Garden, although Poreda later defeated former heavyweight title challenger Tom Heeney. In November 1934, Poreda was knocked out in the first round by the then-undefeated Joe Louis in Chicago.

BoxRec lists Poreda's professional career as lasting from 1929 to 1935, with 46 bouts: 35 wins, including 16 by knockout, 10 losses and one draw.

== Later life and recognition ==
Poreda was inducted into the New Jersey Boxing Hall of Fame on September 12, 1971. He died on November 30, 1983, at the age of 74.
