= Ernie Schaaf =

American boxer (1908–1933)

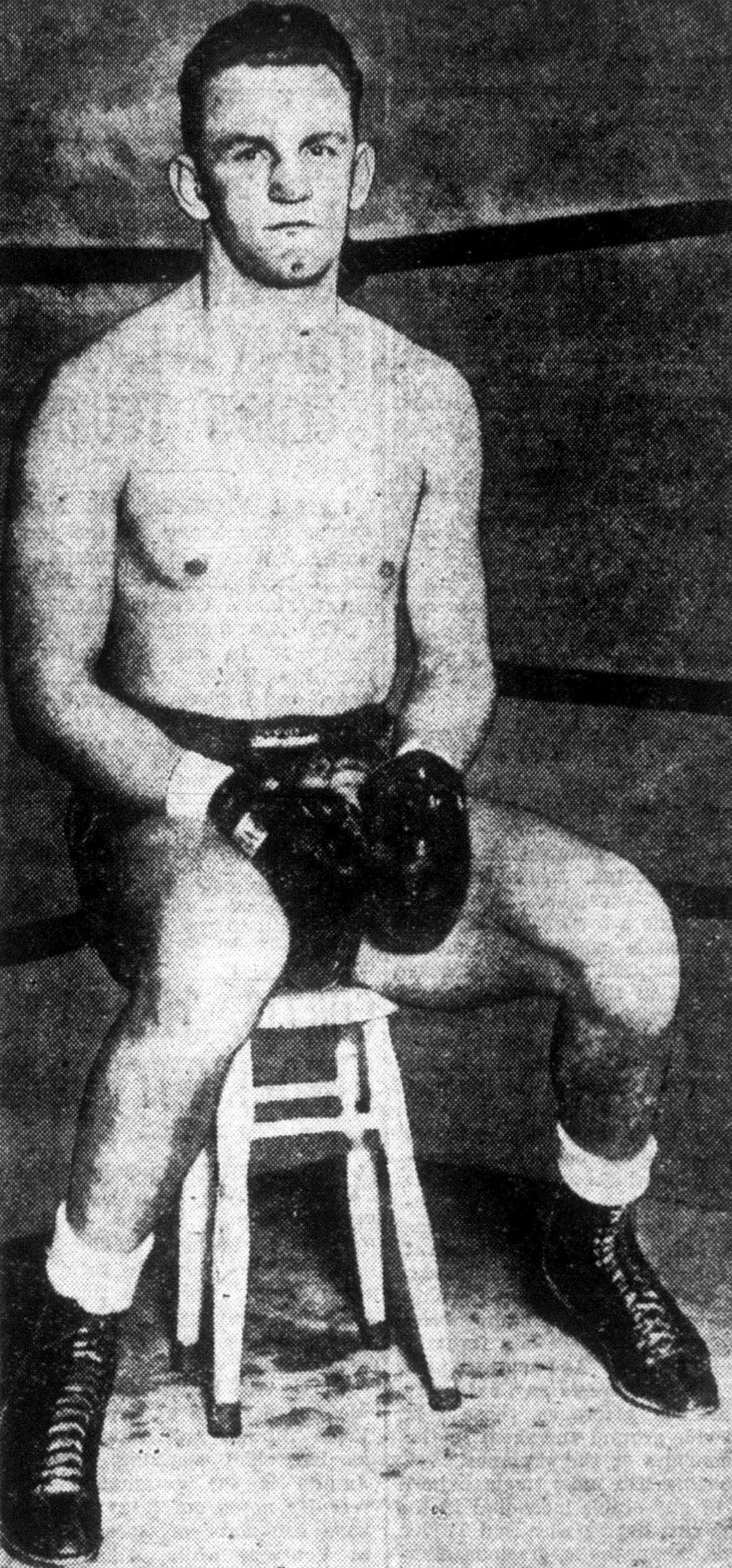
- Schaaf, circa 1933

Personal information
- Nickname: The Tiger of the Sea
- Nationality: (United States) American
- Born: Frederick Ernest Schaaf; September 27, 1908 Elizabeth, New Jersey
- Died: February 14, 1933 (aged 24) New York City
- Weight: Heavyweight

Boxing career
- Stance: Orthodox

Boxing record
- Total fights: 75
- Wins: 58
- Win by KO: 23
- Losses: 14
- Draws: 2
- No contests: 5

Frederick Ernest Schaaf (September 27, 1908 – February 14, 1933) was a professional boxer who was a heavyweight contender in the 1930s but died after a bout.

== Career ==
Schaaf weighed 200–210 pounds (91–95 kg) in his prime which was typical for a heavyweight in that era (175 pounds and up). In the 1930s he went 2 wins, 1 loss with Tommy Loughran, easily outpointed two future heavyweight world champions in Max Baer in their first fight in 1930 and James J. Braddock in 1931. He also outpointed future title challengers Young Stribling and Tony Galento in 1932.

During a second fight with Baer, on 31 August 1932, Schaaf suffered a severe beating and knockout in the final round, hitting the mat two seconds before the final bell, which saved him from an official knockout – Baer won on points. It took several minutes for Schaaf to be revived. Schaaf complained of headaches thereafter, and some observers believe that he suffered brain damage.

Six months later, on 10 February 1933, Schaaf fought Heavyweight contender Primo Carnera, in a bout that would earn Carnera a heavyweight title shot if he won. Schaaf entered as a slight favorite. The bout was held at Madison Square Garden in New York City.

Schaaf lost by KO in round 13. He left the ring unconscious and died four days later. An autopsy revealed that Schaaf had meningitis, a swelling of the brain, and was still recovering from a severe case of influenza which had briefly hospitalized him during his training camp.

== Legacy ==
The cause of Ernie Schaaf's death has been a point of contention for many years. Despite Carnera's knockout of Ernie Schaaf, and Schaaf's documented poor health before the bout, one narrative portrays Schaaf as never having recovered from a knockout by Max Baer six months earlier. A framing echoed in Cinderella Man (2005), “Max Baer's killed two men in the ring.” In The Harder They Fall (1956), Max Baer (essentially playing himself) is upset about not getting credit, and says, "Your joker tapped him. I did the work and he gets the glory. I don't like it."

In The Harder They Fall (1956) a character similar to Schaaf named 'Gus Dundee' is portrayed by boxer Pat Cominskey, who was inducted into the New Jersey Boxing Hall of Fame in 2006.

== Record ==
Schaaf has an official record of 55–13–2 with 1 no contest and 4 no decisions, but the no-decision bouts are due to the scoring practices of the era. Newspaper reports indicate that he won 3 of those, and lost one.

== Professional boxing record ==
All information in this section is derived from BoxRec, unless otherwise stated.

=== Official record ===
75 fights	53 wins	13 losses
By knockout	23	1
By decision	30	10
By disqualification	0	2
Draws	2	
Newspaper decisions/draws	7	

All newspaper decisions are officially regarded as “no decision” bouts and are not counted in the win/loss/draw column.

No.	Result	Record	Opponent	Type	Round, time	Date	Location	Notes
75	Loss	53–13–2 (7)	Primo Carnera	KO	13 (15), 0:51	Feb 10, 1933	Madison Square Garden, New York City, New York, U.S.	Schaaf died from injuries sustained in the fight.
74	Win	53–12–2 (7)	Stanley Poreda	TKO	6 (10), 0:28	Jan 6, 1933	Madison Square Garden, New York City, New York, U.S.	
73	Win	52–12–2 (7)	Edward "Unknown" Winston	KO	6 (12), 2:45	Dec 12, 1932	Arena, Boston, Massachusetts, U.S.	Won vacant New England heavyweight title
72	Loss	51–12–2 (7)	Edward "Unknown" Winston	SD	10	Oct 20, 1932	Arena, Boston, Massachusetts, U.S.	
71	Loss	51–11–2 (7)	Max Baer	MD	10	Aug 31, 1932	Chicago Stadium, Chicago, Illinois, U.S.	
70	Win	51–10–2 (7)	Ted Sandwina	PTS	10	Aug 1, 1932	Coliseum Arena, New Orleans, Louisiana, U.S.	
69	Win	50–10–2 (7)	Paulino Uzcudun	PTS	15	Jul 25, 1932	Madison Square Garden Bowl, Long Island City, New York City, New York, U.S.	
68	Win	49–10–2 (7)	Salvatore Ruggirello	TKO	2 (10), 1:15	Jul 7, 1932	Brooks Field, Scranton, Pennsylvania, U.S.	
67	Loss	48–10–2 (7)	Stanley Poreda	PTS	10	Jun 24, 1932	Stadium, West New York, New Jersey, U.S.	
66	Win	48–9–2 (7)	Tony Galento	PTS	10	Jun 7, 1932	Dreamland Park, Newark, New Jersey, U.S.	
65	Win	47–9–2 (7)	Edward "Unknown" Winston	KO	5 (10)	May 16, 1932	Eastern States Coliseum, West Springfield, Massachusetts, U.S.	
64	Win	46–9–2 (7)	Jack Gross	PTS	10	May 13, 1932	Madison Square Garden, New York City, New York, U.S.	
63	Win	45–9–2 (7)	Ted Sandwina	UD	10	Apr 25, 1932	Valley Arena, Holyoke, Massachusetts, U.S.	
62	Win	44–9–2 (7)	Young Stribling	PTS	10	Feb 26, 1932	Chicago Stadium, Chicago, Illinois, U.S.	
61	Win	43–9–2 (7)	Salvatore Ruggirello	TKO	4 (10), 1:28	Feb 5, 1932	Madison Square Garden, New York City, New York, U.S.	
60	Win	42–9–2 (7)	Giacomo Bergomas	KO	2 (10), 2:43	Dec 16, 1931	Arena, Boston, Massachusetts, U.S.	
59	Win	41–9–2 (7)	Frankie Simms	TKO	3 (10)	Dec 10, 1931	Public Hall, Cleveland, Ohio, U.S.	
58	Win	40–9–2 (7)	Jack Dorval	SD	10	Nov 19, 1931	Boston Garden, Boston, Massachusetts, U.S.	
57	Win	39–9–2 (7)	Tuffy Griffiths	UD	10	Sep 23, 1931	Chicago Stadium, Chicago, Illinois, U.S.	
56	Win	38–9–2 (7)	Roberto Roberti	KO	3 (10)	Sep 10, 1931	Arena, Boston, Massachusetts, U.S.	
55	Win	37–9–2 (7)	Victorio Campolo	KO	7 (12)	Aug 31, 1931	Ebbets Field, New York City, New York, U.S.	
54	Win	36–9–2 (7)	Angus Snyder	TKO	5 (10)	Aug 11, 1931	Boston Garden, Boston, Massachusetts, U.S.	
53	Win	35–9–2 (7)	Jim Maloney	TKO	3 (10)	Jul 10, 1931	Boston Garden, Boston, Massachusetts, U.S.	
52	Win	34–9–2 (7)	Leo Williams	KO	2 (10), 2:40	Jun 29, 1931	American Legion Arena, West Springfield, Massachusetts, U.S.	
51	Win	33–9–2 (7)	Jack Gagnon	KO	1 (10), 0:46	Jun 15, 1931	Ebbets Field, New York City, New York, U.S.	
50	Win	32–9–2 (7)	Jim Maloney	KO	1 (10), 1:10	May 26, 1931	Boston Garden, Boston, Massachusetts, U.S.	Won vacant New England heavyweight title
49	Win	31–9–2 (7)	Paul Pantaleo	NWS	10	Mar 27, 1931	Auditorium, Minneapolis, Minnesota, U.S.	
48	Loss	31–9–2 (6)	Tommy Loughran	UD	10	Mar 13, 1931	Madison Square Garden, New York City, New York, U.S.	
47	Win	31–8–2 (6)	Dynamite Jackson	PTS	10	Feb 24, 1931	Olympic Auditorium, Los Angeles, California, U.S.	
46	Win	30–8–2 (6)	Dick Daniels	KO	1 (10)	Feb 16, 1931	Auditorium, Minneapolis, Minnesota, U.S.	
45	Win	29–8–2 (6)	Dick Daniels	UD	10	Jan 26, 1931	Arena, Boston, Massachusetts, U.S.	
44	Win	28–8–2 (6)	James J. Braddock	SD	10	Jan 23, 1931	Madison Square Garden, New York City, New York, U.S.	
43	Win	27–8–2 (6)	Max Baer	UD	10	Dec 19, 1930	Madison Square Garden, New York City, New York, U.S.	
42	Loss	26–8–2 (6)	Babe Hunt	PTS	10	Sep 2, 1930	Fenway Park, Boston, Massachusetts, U.S.	
41	Win	26–7–2 (6)	Tommy Loughran	UD	10	Jun 11, 1930	Sesquicentennial Stadium, Philadelphia, Pennsylvania, U.S.	
40	Win	25–7–2 (6)	Tommy Loughran	SD	10	Apr 28, 1930	Arena, Philadelphia, Pennsylvania, U.S.	
39	Draw	24–7–2 (6)	Paul Pantaleo	PTS	10	Mar 14, 1930	Chicago Stadium, Chicago, Illinois, U.S.	
38	Win	24–7–1 (6)	Meyer K.O. Christner	PTS	10	Feb 21, 1930	Mechanics Building, Boston, Massachusetts, U.S.	
37	Win	23–7–1 (6)	Al Friedman	PTS	10	Jan 10, 1930	Boston Garden, Boston, Massachusetts, U.S.	
36	Loss	22–7–1 (6)	Johnny Risko	PTS	12	Dec 9, 1929	Public Hall, Cleveland, Ohio, U.S.	
35	Loss	22–6–1 (6)	Meyer K.O. Christner	PTS	10	Oct 18, 1929	Boston Garden, Boston, Massachusetts, U.S.	
34	Win	22–5–1 (6)	Jack Renault	PTS	10	Sep 23, 1929	Ebbets Field, New York City, New York, U.S.	
33	Win	21–5–1 (6)	Jack Gagnon	KO	6 (10)	Jul 15, 1929	Boston Garden, Boston, Massachusetts, U.S.	
32	Win	20–5–1 (6)	Murray Gitlitz	KO	1 (10)	Jul 6, 1929	White City Stadium, West Haven, Connecticut, U.S.	
31	Loss	19–5–1 (6)	Tommy Loughran	PTS	10	May 24, 1929	Boston Garden, Boston, Massachusetts, U.S.	
30	Win	19–4–1 (6)	Al Friedman	PTS	10	Mar 22, 1929	Boston Garden, Boston, Massachusetts, U.S.	
29	Loss	18–4–1 (6)	Young Con O'Kelly	DQ	6 (10)	Feb 15, 1929	Boston Garden, Boston, Massachusetts, U.S.	
28	Win	18–3–1 (6)	Al Friedman	PTS	10	Feb 11, 1929	Arena, Boston, Massachusetts, U.S.	
27	Win	17–3–1 (6)	Johnny Risko	UD	10	Dec 28, 1928	Boston Garden, Boston, Massachusetts, U.S.	
26	Win	16–3–1 (6)	Bud Gorman	PTS	10	Dec 12, 1928	Armory, Newark, New Jersey, U.S.	
25	Win	15–3–1 (6)	James Jay Lawless	TKO	7 (10)	Nov 21, 1928	Armory, Newark, New Jersey, U.S.	
24	Loss	14–3–1 (6)	Tiger Jack Payne	PTS	10	Oct 16, 1928	Braves Field, Boston, Massachusetts, U.S.	
23	Win	14–2–1 (6)	Big Boy Peterson	PTS	10	Sep 4, 1928	Braves Field, Boston, Massachusetts, U.S.	
22	Win	13–2–1 (6)	Harold Mays	PTS	10	Jul 31, 1928	Braves Field, Boston, Massachusetts, U.S.	
21	Win	12–2–1 (6)	Pat McCarthy	PTS	10	Jul 16, 1928	Braves Field, Boston, Massachusetts, U.S.	
20	Loss	11–2–1 (6)	Big Boy Peterson	UD	10	May 25, 1928	Arena, Boston, Massachusetts, U.S.	
19	Loss	11–1–1 (6)	Harold Mays	NWS	10	Apr 30, 1928	113th Regiment Armory, Newark, New Jersey, U.S.	
18	Win	11–1–1 (5)	Benny Touchstone	PTS	10	Apr 2, 1928	Arena, Boston, Massachusetts, U.S.	
17	Win	10–1–1 (5)	Benny Touchstone	PTS	10	Jan 30, 1928	Arena, Boston, Massachusetts, U.S.	
16	Win	9–1–1 (5)	Emilio Solomon	PTS	10	Jan 9, 1928	Arena, Boston, Massachusetts, U.S.	
15	Win	8–1–1 (5)	Yale Okun	NWS	10	Jan 3, 1928	Newark, New Jersey, U.S.	
14	Win	8–1–1 (4)	Murray Gitlitz	NWS	10	Dec 8, 1927	Elizabeth, New Jersey, U.S.	
13	Win	8–1–1 (3)	Yale Okun	PTS	10	Oct 21, 1927	Mechanics Building, Boston, Massachusetts, U.S.	
12	Loss	7–1–1 (3)	Yale Okun	NWS	10	Sep 6, 1927	Halsey Street Arena, Newark, New Jersey, U.S.	
11	Win	7–1–1 (2)	Ray Neuman	NWS	10	Aug 24, 1927	West New York, New Jersey, U.S.	
10	Loss	7–1–1 (1)	Yale Okun	DQ	1 (?)	Aug 16, 1927	Halsey Street Arena, Newark, New Jersey, U.S.	
9	Draw	7–0–1 (1)	Benny Touchstone	PTS	6	Jul 13, 1927	Ebbets Field, New York City, New York, U.S.	
8	Win	7–0 (1)	Dan Lieber	KO	3 (?)	Jul 8, 1927	Elizabeth, New Jersey, U.S.	
7	Win	6–0 (1)	Al Friedman	NWS	10	Jun 18, 1927	Newark, New Jersey, U.S.	
6	Win	6–0	Murray Gitlitz	PTS	6	May 20, 1927	Yankee Stadium, New York City, New York, U.S.	
5	Win	5–0	Sergeant Jack Adams	KO	1 (?), 1:45	Apr 28, 1927	Armory, Elizabeth, New Jersey, U.S.	
4	Win	4–0	Jack Gagnon	KO	2 (10)	Apr 7, 1927	Mechanics Building, Boston, Massachusetts, U.S.	
3	Win	3–0	Ad Stone	KO	4 (10)	Apr 1, 1927	Armory, Elizabeth, New Jersey, U.S.	
2	Win	2–0	Al Friedman	PTS	6	Mar 17, 1927	Mechanics Building, Boston, Massachusetts, U.S.	
1	Win	1–0	Jack Darnell	TKO	2 (10)	Mar 11, 1927	Armory, Elizabeth, New Jersey, U.S.	

=== Unofficial record ===
75 fights	58 wins	15 losses
By knockout	23	1
By decision	35	12
By disqualification	0	2
Draws	2	

Record with the inclusion of newspaper decisions in the win/loss/draw column.

No.	Result	Record	Opponent	Type	Round	Date	Location	Notes
75	Loss	58–15–2	Primo Carnera	KO	13 (15), 0:51	Feb 10, 1933	Madison Square Garden, New York City, New York, U.S.	Schaaf died from injuries sustained in the fight.
74	Win	58–14–2	Stanley Poreda	TKO	6 (10), 0:28	Jan 6, 1933	Madison Square Garden, New York City, New York, U.S.	
73	Win	57–14–2	Edward "Unknown" Winston	KO	6 (12), 2:45	Dec 12, 1932	Arena, Boston, Massachusetts, U.S.	Won vacant New England heavyweight title
72	Loss	56–14–2	Edward "Unknown" Winston	SD	10	Oct 20, 1932	Arena, Boston, Massachusetts, U.S.	
71	Loss	56–13–2	Max Baer	MD	10	Aug 31, 1932	Chicago Stadium, Chicago, Illinois, U.S.	
70	Win	56–12–2	Ted Sandwina	PTS	10	Aug 1, 1932	Coliseum Arena, New Orleans, Louisiana, U.S.	
69	Win	55–12–2	Paulino Uzcudun	PTS	15	Jul 25, 1932	Madison Square Garden Bowl, Long Island City, New York City, New York, U.S.	
68	Win	54–12–2	Salvatore Ruggirello	TKO	2 (10), 1:15	Jul 7, 1932	Brooks Field, Scranton, Pennsylvania, U.S.	
67	Loss	53–12–2	Stanley Poreda	PTS	10	Jun 24, 1932	Stadium, West New York, New Jersey, U.S.	
66	Win	53–11–2	Tony Galento	PTS	10	Jun 7, 1932	Dreamland Park, Newark, New Jersey, U.S.	
65	Win	52–11–2	Edward "Unknown" Winston	KO	5 (10)	May 16, 1932	Eastern States Coliseum, West Springfield, Massachusetts, U.S.	
64	Win	51–11–2	Jack Gross	PTS	10	May 13, 1932	Madison Square Garden, New York City, New York, U.S.	
63	Win	50–11–2	Ted Sandwina	UD	10	Apr 25, 1932	Valley Arena, Holyoke, Massachusetts, U.S.	
62	Win	49–11–2	Young Stribling	PTS	10	Feb 26, 1932	Chicago Stadium, Chicago, Illinois, U.S.	
61	Win	48–11–2	Salvatore Ruggirello	TKO	4 (10), 1:28	Feb 5, 1932	Madison Square Garden, New York City, New York, U.S.	
60	Win	47–11–2	Giacomo Bergomas	KO	2 (10), 2:43	Dec 16, 1931	Arena, Boston, Massachusetts, U.S.	
59	Win	46–11–2	Frankie Simms	TKO	3 (10)	Dec 10, 1931	Public Hall, Cleveland, Ohio, U.S.	
58	Win	45–11–2	Jack Dorval	SD	10	Nov 19, 1931	Boston Garden, Boston, Massachusetts, U.S.	
57	Win	44–11–2	Tuffy Griffiths	UD	10	Sep 23, 1931	Chicago Stadium, Chicago, Illinois, U.S.	
56	Win	43–11–2	Roberto Roberti	KO	3 (10)	Sep 10, 1931	Arena, Boston, Massachusetts, U.S.	
55	Win	42–11–2	Victorio Campolo	KO	7 (12)	Aug 31, 1931	Ebbets Field, New York City, New York, U.S.	
54	Win	41–11–2	Angus Snyder	TKO	5 (10)	Aug 11, 1931	Boston Garden, Boston, Massachusetts, U.S.	
53	Win	40–11–2	Jim Maloney	TKO	3 (10)	Jul 10, 1931	Boston Garden, Boston, Massachusetts, U.S.	
52	Win	39–11–2	Leo Williams	KO	2 (10), 2:40	Jun 29, 1931	American Legion Arena, West Springfield, Massachusetts, U.S.	
51	Win	38–11–2	Jack Gagnon	KO	1 (10), 0:46	Jun 15, 1931	Ebbets Field, New York City, New York, U.S.	
50	Win	37–11–2	Jim Maloney	KO	1 (10), 1:10	May 26, 1931	Boston Garden, Boston, Massachusetts, U.S.	Won vacant New England heavyweight title
49	Win	36–11–2	Paul Pantaleo	NWS	10	Mar 27, 1931	Auditorium, Minneapolis, Minnesota, U.S.	
48	Loss	35–11–2	Tommy Loughran	UD	10	Mar 13, 1931	Madison Square Garden, New York City, New York, U.S.	
47	Win	35–10–2	Dynamite Jackson	PTS	10	Feb 24, 1931	Olympic Auditorium, Los Angeles, California, U.S.	
46	Win	34–10–2	Dick Daniels	KO	1 (10)	Feb 16, 1931	Auditorium, Minneapolis, Minnesota, U.S.	
45	Win	33–10–2	Dick Daniels	UD	10	Jan 26, 1931	Arena, Boston, Massachusetts, U.S.	
44	Win	32–10–2	James J. Braddock	SD	10	Jan 23, 1931	Madison Square Garden, New York City, New York, U.S.	
43	Win	31–10–2	Max Baer	UD	10	Dec 19, 1930	Madison Square Garden, New York City, New York, U.S.	
42	Loss	30–10–2	Babe Hunt	PTS	10	Sep 2, 1930	Fenway Park, Boston, Massachusetts, U.S.	
41	Win	30–9–2	Tommy Loughran	UD	10	Jun 11, 1930	Sesquicentennial Stadium, Philadelphia, Pennsylvania, U.S.	
40	Win	29–9–2	Tommy Loughran	SD	10	Apr 28, 1930	Arena, Philadelphia, Pennsylvania, U.S.	
39	Draw	28–9–2	Paul Pantaleo	PTS	10	Mar 14, 1930	Chicago Stadium, Chicago, Illinois, U.S.	
38	Win	28–9–1	Meyer K.O. Christner	PTS	10	Feb 21, 1930	Mechanics Building, Boston, Massachusetts, U.S.	
37	Win	27–9–1	Al Friedman	PTS	10	Jan 10, 1930	Boston Garden, Boston, Massachusetts, U.S.	
36	Loss	26–9–1	Johnny Risko	PTS	12	Dec 9, 1929	Public Hall, Cleveland, Ohio, U.S.	
35	Loss	26–8–1	Meyer K.O. Christner	PTS	10	Oct 18, 1929	Boston Garden, Boston, Massachusetts, U.S.	
34	Win	26–7–1	Jack Renault	PTS	10	Sep 23, 1929	Ebbets Field, New York City, New York, U.S.	
33	Win	25–7–1	Jack Gagnon	KO	6 (10)	Jul 15, 1929	Boston Garden, Boston, Massachusetts, U.S.	
32	Win	24–7–1	Murray Gitlitz	KO	1 (10)	Jul 6, 1929	White City Stadium, West Haven, Connecticut, U.S.	
31	Loss	23–7–1	Tommy Loughran	PTS	10	May 24, 1929	Boston Garden, Boston, Massachusetts, U.S.	
30	Win	23–6–1	Al Friedman	PTS	10	Mar 22, 1929	Boston Garden, Boston, Massachusetts, U.S.	
29	Loss	22–6–1	Young Con O'Kelly	DQ	6 (10)	Feb 15, 1929	Boston Garden, Boston, Massachusetts, U.S.	
28	Win	22–5–1	Al Friedman	PTS	10	Feb 11, 1929	Arena, Boston, Massachusetts, U.S.	
27	Win	21–5–1	Johnny Risko	UD	10	Dec 28, 1928	Boston Garden, Boston, Massachusetts, U.S.	
26	Win	20–5–1	Bud Gorman	PTS	10	Dec 12, 1928	Armory, Newark, New Jersey, U.S.	
25	Win	19–5–1	James Jay Lawless	TKO	7 (10)	Nov 21, 1928	Armory, Newark, New Jersey, U.S.	
24	Loss	18–5–1	Tiger Jack Payne	PTS	10	Oct 16, 1928	Braves Field, Boston, Massachusetts, U.S.	
23	Win	18–4–1	Big Boy Peterson	PTS	10	Sep 4, 1928	Braves Field, Boston, Massachusetts, U.S.	
22	Win	17–4–1	Harold Mays	PTS	10	Jul 31, 1928	Braves Field, Boston, Massachusetts, U.S.	
21	Win	16–4–1	Pat McCarthy	PTS	10	Jul 16, 1928	Braves Field, Boston, Massachusetts, U.S.	
20	Loss	15–4–1	Big Boy Peterson	UD	10	May 25, 1928	Arena, Boston, Massachusetts, U.S.	
19	Loss	15–3–1	Harold Mays	NWS	10	Apr 30, 1928	113th Regiment Armory, Newark, New Jersey, U.S.	
18	Win	15–2–1	Benny Touchstone	PTS	10	Apr 2, 1928	Arena, Boston, Massachusetts, U.S.	
17	Win	14–2–1	Benny Touchstone	PTS	10	Jan 30, 1928	Arena, Boston, Massachusetts, U.S.	
16	Win	13–2–1	Emilio Solomon	PTS	10	Jan 9, 1928	Arena, Boston, Massachusetts, U.S.	
15	Win	12–2–1	Yale Okun	NWS	10	Jan 3, 1928	Newark, New Jersey, U.S.	
14	Win	11–2–1	Murray Gitlitz	NWS	10	Dec 8, 1927	Elizabeth, New Jersey, U.S.	
13	Win	10–2–1	Yale Okun	PTS	10	Oct 21, 1927	Mechanics Building, Boston, Massachusetts, U.S.	
12	Loss	9–2–1	Yale Okun	NWS	10	Sep 6, 1927	Halsey Street Arena, Newark, New Jersey, U.S.	
11	Win	9–1–1	Ray Neuman	NWS	10	Aug 24, 1927	West New York, New Jersey, U.S.	
10	Loss	8–1–1	Yale Okun	DQ	1 (?)	Aug 16, 1927	Halsey Street Arena, Newark, New Jersey, U.S.	
9	Draw	8–0–1	Benny Touchstone	PTS	6	Jul 13, 1927	Ebbets Field, New York City, New York, U.S.	
8	Win	8–0	Dan Lieber	KO	3 (?)	Jul 8, 1927	Elizabeth, New Jersey, U.S.	
7	Win	7–0	Al Friedman	NWS	10	Jun 18, 1927	Newark, New Jersey, U.S.	
6	Win	6–0	Murray Gitlitz	PTS	6	May 20, 1927	Yankee Stadium, New York City, New York, U.S.	
5	Win	5–0	Sergeant Jack Adams	KO	1 (?), 1:45	Apr 28, 1927	Armory, Elizabeth, New Jersey, U.S.	
4	Win	4–0	Jack Gagnon	KO	2 (10)	Apr 7, 1927	Mechanics Building, Boston, Massachusetts, U.S.	
3	Win	3–0	Ad Stone	KO	4 (10)	Apr 1, 1927	Armory, Elizabeth, New Jersey, U.S.	
2	Win	2–0	Al Friedman	PTS	6	Mar 17, 1927	Mechanics Building, Boston, Massachusetts, U.S.	
1	Win	1–0	Jack Darnell	TKO	2 (10)	Mar 11, 1927	Armory, Elizabeth, New Jersey, U.S.	

== Bibliography ==
- Page, Joseph S. (2010). Primo Carnera: The Life and Career of the Heavyweight Boxing Champion. Jefferson, North Carolina: McFarland & Company. ISBN 978-0-7864-4810-4.
