= Tommy Loughran =

American boxer (1902–1982)

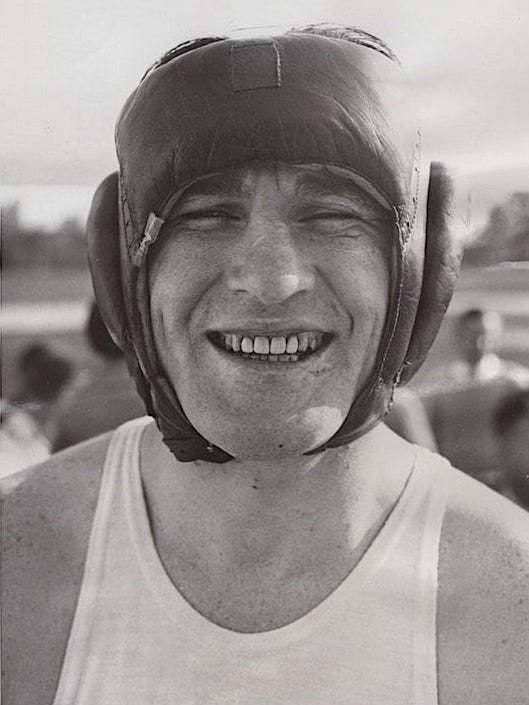
- Loughran in 1934

Personal information
- Nickname: The Philly Phantom
- Nationality: American
- Born: Thomas Loughran; November 29, 1902 Philadelphia, Pennsylvania
- Died: July 7, 1982 (aged 79) Altoona, Pennsylvania
- Height: 5 ft 11 1/2 in (1.82 m)
- Weight: Light heavyweight; Heavyweight

Boxing career
- Reach: 73 in (190 cm)
- Stance: Orthodox

Boxing record
- Total fights: 170
- Wins: 124
- Win by KO: 14
- Losses: 32
- Draws: 13
- No contests: 1

Thomas Patrick Loughran (November 29, 1902 – July 7, 1982) was an American professional boxer and the former World Light Heavyweight Champion. Statistical boxing website BoxRec lists Loughran as the #7 ranked light heavyweight of all time, while The Ring Magazine founder Nat Fleischer placed him at #4. The International Boxing Research Organization rates Loughran as the 6th best light heavyweight ever. Loughran was named the Ring Magazine's Fighter of the Year twice, first in 1929 and again 1931. He was inducted into the Ring Magazine Hall of Fame in 1956 and the International Boxing Hall of Fame in 1991.

== Boxing career ==
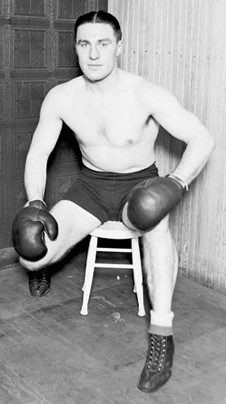
Loughran in 1929

Loughran was one of seven children of an Irish immigrant motorman. His effective use of coordinated foot work, sound defense and swift, accurate counter punching is now regarded as a precursor to the techniques practiced in modern boxing.

Loughran fought many middleweight, light heavyweight, and heavyweight champions in his career, including Gene Tunney, Jack Sharkey, and Georges Carpentier. Loughran even achieved a newspaper decision over fistic phenom Harry Greb, whom he first met at age 19. As a light heavyweight, he defeated two future world heavyweight champions: Max Baer and James J. Braddock. Loughran finally fought Primo Carnera for the heavyweight title but lost a decision.

In an interview late in life, Loughran said his loss to Carnera was a pre-arranged fait accompli: "I had to knock him out to win, I had to agree to that". Footage of the fight is limited and scarce, but Loughran contended he had Carnera in trouble in Rounds 4 and 10, "but then, when I couldn't finish him, I knew the thing was over". The decision a foregone conclusion, Tommy Loughran told Peter Heller in April, 1972, "I beat (Carnera), no question about it".

== Later life ==
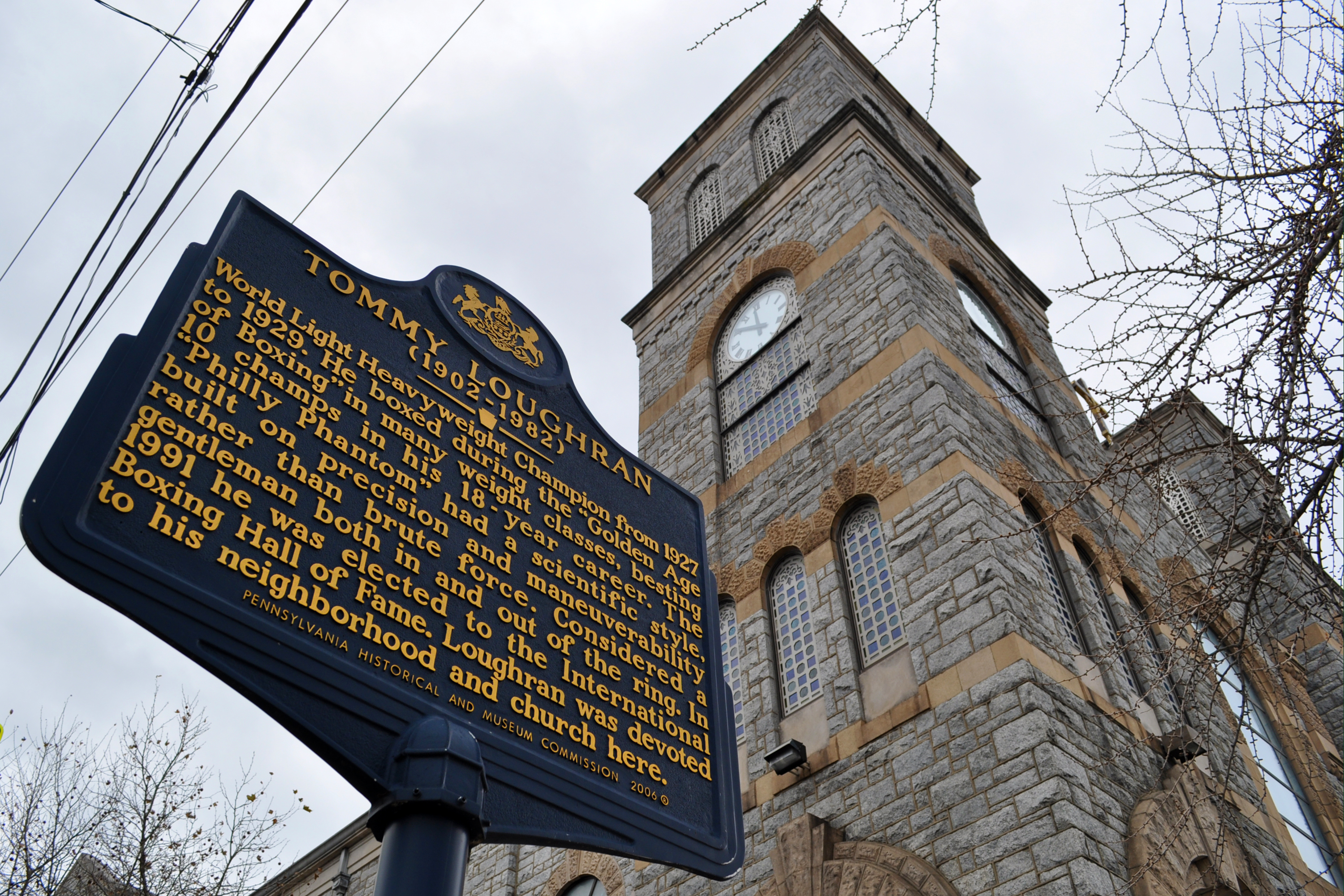
Historical Marker, 2400 S. 17th St. Philadelphia PA

On August 22, 1957, he refereed Floyd Patterson's defense of his heavyweight title vs. 1956 Olympic gold medalist Pete Rademacher, at Sick's Stadium, Seattle. The fight was notable in that Rademacher was the first and only fighter to challenge for the heavyweight crown in his professional debut. There were several knockdowns in the fight; Tommy counted out the challenger at 2:57 of the 6th round.

In the 1960s Loughran retired from having been a long-time, successful broker on Wall Street, where he had dealt in commodities (sugar). He became a keynote speaker, appearing at dinners and banquets, his message an attempt to promote and strengthen the image of boxers and boxing at what for the sport was a troubled time. In addition, Tommy lent color commentary to at least one championship bout, Carlos Ortiz vs. Johnny Bizarro in Pittsburgh, June 20, 1966.

In 2006, the Pennsylvania Historical & Museum Commission raised a historical marker in front of St. Monica's Roman Catholic Church, in his old neighborhood, and reads in part: He boxed during the "Golden Age of Boxing" in many weight classes, beating 10 champs in his 18-year career. The "Philly Phantom" had a scientific style, built on precision and maneuverability rather than brute force. Considered a gentleman both in and out of the ring. Loughran was devoted to his neighborhood and church here.

== Professional boxing record ==
All information in this section is derived from BoxRec, unless otherwise stated.

=== Official record ===
170 fights	90 wins	25 losses
By knockout	14	3
By decision	75	22
By disqualification	1	0
Draws	10	
No contests	1	
Newspaper decisions/draws	44	

All newspaper decisions are officially regarded as “no decision” bouts and are not counted in the win/loss/draw column.

No.	Result	Record	Opponent	Type	Round	Date	Location	Notes
170	Win	90–25–10 (45)	Sonny Boy Walker	UD	10	Jan 18, 1937	Arena, Philadelphia, Pennsylvania, U.S.	
169	Loss	89–25–10 (45)	Sonny Boy Walker	PTS	10	Dec 9, 1936	Civic Auditorium, San Francisco, California, U.S.	
168	Win	89–24–10 (45)	Tom Beaupre	UD	10	Dec 3, 1936	Sportatorium, Dallas, Texas, U.S.	
167	Win	88–24–10 (45)	Alfred Rogers	PTS	10	Nov 13, 1936	Coliseum, San Diego, California, U.S.	
166	Win	87–24–10 (45)	Tony Rossalia	KO	3 (10)	Oct 9, 1936	Chestnut St. Arena, Reno, Nevada, U.S.	
165	Win	86–24–10 (45)	Ray Impelletiere	PTS	10	Sep 16, 1936	Auditorium, Oakland, California, U.S.	
164	Draw	85–24–10 (45)	Al McCoy	PTS	12	Jul 30, 1936	Delormier Stadium, Montreal, Quebec, Canada	
163	Loss	85–24–9 (45)	Al McCoy	PTS	10	Jul 6, 1936	Delormier Stadium, Montreal, Quebec, Canada	Not to be confused with Al McCoy
162	Win	85–23–9 (45)	Jack London	PTS	10	Mar 16, 1936	Colston Hall, Bristol, Avon, England, U.K.	
161	Loss	84–23–9 (45)	Ben Foord	PTS	12	Feb 10, 1936	Granby Halls, Leicester, Leicestershire, England, U.K.	
160	Loss	84–22–9 (45)	Tommy Farr	PTS	10	Jan 15, 1936	Royal Albert Hall, Kensington, London, England, U.K.	
159	Draw	84–21–9 (45)	Andre Lenglet	PTS	10	Dec 9, 1935	Palais des Sports, Paris, Paris, France	
158	Win	84–21–8 (45)	Maurice Strickland	PTS	10	Nov 12, 1935	Wembley Arena, Wembley, London, England, U.K.	
157	Draw	83–21–8 (45)	Al Delaney	MD	6	Aug 22, 1935	Offermann Stadium, Buffalo, New York, U.S.	
156	Win	83–21–7 (45)	Eddie Simms	SD	10	Jul 29, 1935	Maple Leaf Stadium, Toronto, Ontario, Canada	
155	Win	82–21–7 (45)	Ray Impelletiere	UD	10	Jun 20, 1935	Baker Bowl, Philadelphia, Pennsylvania, U.S.	
154	Win	81–21–7 (45)	Al Ettore	MD	10	May 20, 1935	Arena, Philadelphia, Pennsylvania, U.S.	Won vacant Pennsylvania State heavyweight title
153	Win	80–21–7 (45)	Vicente Parrile	TKO	9 (10)	Apr 14, 1935	Plaza de Toros de Acho, Lima, Peru	
152	Loss	79–21–7 (45)	Arturo Godoy	PTS	10	Mar 17, 1935	Campos de Sports de Ñuñoa, Santiago de Chile, Chile	
151	Draw	79–20–7 (45)	Jose Carattoli	MD	12	Feb 2, 1935	Estadio Luna Park, Buenos Aires, Distrito Federal, Argentina	
150	Win	79–20–6 (45)	Arturo Godoy	UD	12	Jan 5, 1935	Estadio Luna Park, Buenos Aires, Distrito Federal, Argentina	
149	Draw	78–20–6 (45)	Arturo Godoy	PTS	12	Oct 20, 1934	Estadio Luna Park, Buenos Aires, Distrito Federal, Argentina	
148	Loss	78–20–5 (45)	Jose Carattoli	UD	12	Oct 6, 1934	Estadio Luna Park, Buenos Aires, Distrito Federal, Argentina	
147	Loss	78–19–5 (45)	Johnny Risko	UD	10	Aug 1, 1934	Municipal Stadium, Freeport, New York, U.S.	
146	Loss	78–18–5 (45)	Walter Neusel	SD	10	May 4, 1934	Madison Square Garden, New York City, New York, U.S.	
145	Loss	78–17–5 (45)	Primo Carnera	UD	15	Mar 1, 1934	Madison Square Garden Stadium, Miami, Florida, U.S.	For NYSAC, NBA, and The Ring heavyweight titles
144	Win	78–16–5 (45)	Ray Impelletiere	PTS	10	Nov 22, 1933	New York Coliseum, New York City, New York, U.S.	
143	Win	77–16–5 (45)	Jack Sharkey	SD	15	Sep 27, 1933	Shibe Park, Philadelphia, Pennsylvania, U.S.	
142	Loss	76–16–5 (45)	Johnny Risko	SD	10	Jul 26, 1933	Mills Stadium, Chicago, Illinois, U.S.	
141	Win	76–15–5 (45)	Steve Hamas	UD	10	Jun 21, 1933	Yankee Stadium, New York City, New York, U.S.	
140	Win	75–15–5 (45)	Isidoro Gastanaga	PTS	10	Apr 21, 1933	Chicago Stadium, Chicago, Illinois, U.S.	
139	Win	74–15–5 (45)	Walter Cobb	UD	10	Feb 13, 1933	Arena, Philadelphia, Pennsylvania, U.S.	
138	Win	73–15–5 (45)	King Levinsky	UD	10	Jan 10, 1933	Convention Hall, Philadelphia, Pennsylvania, U.S.	
137	Loss	72–15–5 (45)	Stanley Poreda	UD	10	Oct 17, 1932	Arena, Philadelphia, Pennsylvania, U.S.	
136	Win	72–14–5 (45)	Steve Hamas	SD	10	Jun 29, 1932	Shibe Park, Philadelphia, Pennsylvania, U.S.	
135	Loss	71–14–5 (45)	Steve Hamas	SD	10	May 11, 1932	Convention Hall, Philadelphia, Pennsylvania, U.S.	
134	Loss	71–13–5 (45)	Steve Hamas	TKO	2 (10)	Jan 15, 1932	Madison Square Garden, New York City, New York, U.S.	
133	Loss	71–12–5 (45)	King Levinsky	UD	10	Dec 18, 1931	Madison Square Garden, New York City, New York, U.S.	
132	Win	71–11–5 (45)	Paulino Uzcudun	SD	10	Nov 13, 1931	Madison Square Garden, New York City, New York, U.S.	
131	Win	70–11–5 (45)	Johnny Risko	PTS	10	Oct 19, 1931	Arena, Philadelphia, Pennsylvania, U.S.	
130	Loss	69–11–5 (45)	Joe Sekyra	MD	10	Sep 22, 1931	Queensboro Stadium, Long Island City, New York City, New York, U.S.	
129	Win	69–10–5 (45)	Jack Gross	UD	10	Sep 9, 1931	Baker Bowl, Philadelphia, Pennsylvania, U.S.	
128	Win	68–10–5 (45)	Victorio Campolo	UD	10	May 15, 1931	Madison Square Garden, New York City, New York, U.S.	
127	Win	67–10–5 (45)	Tuffy Griffiths	MD	10	Mar 27, 1931	Chicago Stadium, Chicago, Illinois, U.S.	
126	Win	66–10–5 (45)	Ernie Schaaf	UD	10	Mar 13, 1931	Madison Square Garden, New York City, New York, U.S.	
125	Win	65–10–5 (45)	Max Baer	UD	10	Feb 6, 1931	Madison Square Garden, New York City, New York, U.S.	
124	Win	64–10–5 (45)	Jack Gross	PTS	10	Jan 26, 1931	Arena, Philadelphia, Pennsylvania, U.S.	
123	Win	63–10–5 (45)	King Levinsky	UD	10	Nov 21, 1930	Chicago Stadium, Chicago, Illinois, U.S.	
122	Win	62–10–5 (45)	Dave Maier	PTS	10	Oct 23, 1930	Auditorium, Milwaukee, Wisconsin, U.S.	
121	Win	61–10–5 (45)	Dick Daniels	NWS	10	Oct 16, 1930	Auditorium, Minneapolis, Minnesota, U.S.	
120	Loss	61–10–5 (44)	Ernie Schaaf	UD	10	Jun 11, 1930	Sesquicentennial Stadium, Philadelphia, Pennsylvania, U.S.	
119	Loss	61–9–5 (44)	Ernie Schaaf	SD	10	Apr 28, 1930	Arena, Philadelphia, Pennsylvania, U.S.	
118	Win	61–8–5 (44)	Jack Renault	UD	10	Mar 17, 1930	Arena, Philadelphia, Pennsylvania, U.S.	
117	Win	60–8–5 (44)	Pierre Charles	PTS	10	Feb 27, 1930	Madison Square Garden Stadium, Miami, Florida, U.S.	
116	Loss	59–8–5 (44)	Jack Sharkey	TKO	3 (15)	Sep 26, 1929	Yankee Stadium, New York City, New York, U.S.	For vacant ABA heavyweight title
115	Win	59–7–5 (44)	James J. Braddock	UD	15	Jul 18, 1929	Yankee Stadium, New York City, New York, U.S.	Retained NYSAC, NBA, and The Ring light-heavyweight titles
114	Win	58–7–5 (44)	Ernie Schaaf	PTS	10	May 24, 1929	Boston Garden, Boston, Massachusetts, U.S.	
113	Win	57–7–5 (44)	Mickey Walker	SD	10	Mar 28, 1929	Chicago Stadium, Chicago, Illinois, U.S.	Retained NYSAC, NBA, and The Ring light-heavyweight titles
112	Win	56–7–5 (44)	Joe Lohman	PTS	10	Feb 20, 1929	Convention Hall, Tulsa, Oklahoma, U.S.	
111	Win	55–7–5 (44)	Armand Emanuel	PTS	10	Feb 5, 1929	Olympic Auditorium, Los Angeles, California, U.S.	
110	Win	54–7–5 (44)	Big Boy Peterson	PTS	10	Dec 17, 1928	Coliseum, Chicago, Illinois, U.S.	
109	Win	53–7–5 (44)	Jack Gross	PTS	10	Oct 1, 1928	Baker Bowl, Philadelphia, Pennsylvania, U.S.	
108	Win	52–7–5 (44)	Pete Latzo	UD	10	Jul 16, 1928	Artillery Park, Wilkes-Barre, Pennsylvania, U.S.	Retained NYSAC, NBA, and The Ring light-heavyweight titles
107	Win	51–7–5 (44)	Armand Emanuel	UD	10	Jun 28, 1928	Madison Square Garden, New York City, New York, U.S.	
106	Win	50–7–5 (44)	Pete Latzo	UD	15	Jun 1, 1928	Ebbets Field, New York City, New York, U.S.	Retained NYSAC, NBA, and The Ring light-heavyweight titles
105	Win	49–7–5 (44)	Joe Sekyra	NWS	10	May 18, 1928	Jefferson County Armory, Louisville, Kentucky, U.S.	
104	Win	49–7–5 (43)	Leo Lomski	UD	15	Jan 6, 1928	Madison Square Garden, New York City, New York, U.S.	Retained NYSAC, NBA, and The Ring light-heavyweight titles
103	Win	48–7–5 (43)	Jimmy Slattery	MD	15	Dec 12, 1927	Madison Square Garden, New York City, New York, U.S.	Retained NYSAC light-heavyweight title; Won NBA and vacant The Ring light-heavyweight titles
102	Win	47–7–5 (43)	Pat McCarthy	PTS	10	Nov 14, 1927	Arena, Philadelphia, Pennsylvania, U.S.	
101	Win	46–7–5 (43)	Mike McTigue	UD	15	Oct 7, 1927	Madison Square Garden, New York City, New York, U.S.	Won NYSAC light-heavyweight title
100	Win	45–7–5 (43)	Benny Ross	MD	12	Aug 8, 1927	Broadway Auditorium, Buffalo, New York, U.S.	
99	Win	44–7–5 (43)	Tony Marullo	PTS	10	Jul 20, 1927	Queensboro Stadium, Long Island City, New York City, New York, U.S.	
98	Win	43–7–5 (43)	Young Stribling	UD	10	May 3, 1927	Ebbets Field, New York City, New York, U.S.	
97	Win	42–7–5 (43)	Tom Kirby	PTS	10	Apr 6, 1927	108th Field Artillery Armory, Philadelphia, Pennsylvania, U.S.	
96	Win	41–7–5 (43)	Joe Lohman	PTS	10	Mar 16, 1927	108th Field Artillery Armory, Philadelphia, Pennsylvania, U.S.	
95	Win	40–7–5 (43)	Johnny Risko	UD	10	Feb 15, 1927	South Main Street Armory, Wilkes-Barre, Pennsylvania, U.S.	
94	Win	39–7–5 (43)	Tony Marullo	UD	10	Jan 10, 1927	Arena, Philadelphia, Pennsylvania, U.S.	
93	Win	38–7–5 (43)	George Manley	NWS	10	Nov 29, 1926	Tomlinson Hall, Indianapolis, Indiana, U.S.	
92	Win	38–7–5 (42)	Chuck Wiggins	DQ	5 (10)	Oct 29, 1926	Providence, Rhode Island, U.S.	
91	Win	37–7–5 (42)	Martin Burke	PTS	10	Oct 18, 1926	Madison Gardens, Chicago, Illinois, U.S.	
90	Win	36–7–5 (42)	Frankie Schramm	KO	2 (10)	Oct 8, 1926	Manhattan Auditorium, Allentown, Pennsylvania, U.S.	
89	Win	35–7–5 (42)	Johnny Risko	PTS	6	Sep 23, 1926	Sesquicentennial Stadium, Philadelphia, Pennsylvania, U.S.	
88	Win	34–7–5 (42)	Johnny Risko	PTS	10	Jul 30, 1926	Mechanics Building, Boston, Massachusetts, U.S.	
87	Win	33–7–5 (42)	George Manley	PTS	10	Jul 2, 1926	League Park, Omaha, Nebraska, U.S.	
86	Win	32–7–5 (42)	Georges Carpentier	UD	10	Jun 17, 1926	Sesquicentennial Stadium, Philadelphia, Pennsylvania, U.S.	
85	Win	31–7–5 (42)	Tom Kirby	PTS	10	Apr 13, 1926	Arena, Boston, Massachusetts, U.S.	
84	Win	30–7–5 (42)	Yale Okun	UD	10	Apr 5, 1926	Arena, Philadelphia, Pennsylvania, U.S.	
83	Win	29–7–5 (42)	Yale Okun	UD	10	Mar 15, 1926	Arena, Philadelphia, Pennsylvania, U.S.	
82	Win	28–7–5 (42)	Chuck Wiggins	NWS	10	Feb 12, 1926	Armory, Grand Rapids, Michigan, U.S.	
81	Win	28–7–5 (41)	Ad Stone	PTS	10	Feb 8, 1926	Arena, Philadelphia, Pennsylvania, U.S.	
80	Win	27–7–5 (41)	Joe Packo	NWS	10	Jan 6, 1926	Armory, Grand Rapids, Michigan, U.S.	
79	Win	27–7–5 (40)	Billy Freas	NWS	10	Jan 1, 1926	Armory, Grand Rapids, Michigan, U.S.	
78	Win	27–7–5 (39)	Emilio Solomon	PTS	10	Dec 25, 1925	Arena, Philadelphia, Pennsylvania, U.S.	
77	Loss	26–7–5 (39)	Ad Stone	PTS	10	Oct 26, 1925	Arena, Philadelphia, Pennsylvania, U.S.	
76	Win	26–6–5 (39)	Benny Ross	PTS	10	Oct 5, 1925	Broadway Auditorium, Buffalo, New York, U.S.	
75	Win	25–6–5 (39)	Jack Burke	TKO	6 (10)	Sep 24, 1925	Shibe Park, Philadelphia, Pennsylvania, U.S.	
74	Win	24–6–5 (39)	Tony Marullo	UD	8	Sep 11, 1925	Yankee Stadium, New York City, New York, U.S.	
73	Draw	23–6–5 (39)	Jack Delaney	PTS	10	Jul 16, 1925	Shibe Park, Philadelphia, Pennsylvania, U.S.	
72	Win	23–6–4 (39)	Martin Burke	PTS	12	Jun 11, 1925	Dexter Park Stadium, Woodhaven, New York City, New York, U.S.	
71	Loss	22–6–4 (39)	Young Stribling	PTS	10	Mar 28, 1925	Recreation Park, San Francisco, California, U.S.	
70	Win	22–5–4 (39)	Jack Reeves	PTS	10	Feb 18, 1925	Auditorium, Oakland, California, U.S.	
69	Win	21–5–4 (39)	Billy Freas	PTS	10	Feb 7, 1925	Culver City Stadium, Culver City, California, U.S.	
68	Draw	20–5–4 (39)	Buck Holley	PTS	6	Feb 4, 1925	Auditorium, Oakland, California, U.S.	
67	Win	20–5–3 (39)	Frankie Maguire	PTS	10	Jan 1, 1925	Armory, Williamsport, Pennsylvania, U.S.	
66	Win	19–5–3 (39)	George Blake	KO	2 (10)	Nov 20, 1924	Armory, Williamsport, Pennsylvania, U.S.	
65	Draw	18–5–3 (39)	Harry Greb	SD	10	Oct 13, 1924	Arena, Philadelphia, Pennsylvania, U.S.	
64	Win	18–5–2 (39)	Joe Lohman	PTS	10	Jul 11, 1924	Erie Arena, Erie, Pennsylvania, U.S.	
63	Loss	17–5–2 (39)	Young Stribling	PTS	6	Jun 26, 1924	Yankee Stadium, New York City, New York, U.S.	
62	Win	17–4–2 (39)	Jack Smith	KO	2 (10)	Jun 16, 1924	Moose Hall, Shamokin, Pennsylvania, U.S.	
61	Draw	16–4–2 (39)	Ad Stone	PTS	10	May 19, 1924	Shetzline Ballpark, Philadelphia, Pennsylvania, U.S.	
60	Win	16–4–1 (39)	Charley Nashert	NWS	10	Apr 28, 1924	Danceland Arena, Detroit, Michigan, U.S.	
59	Loss	16–4–1 (38)	Jack Delaney	PTS	10	Feb 19, 1924	Mechanics Building, Boston, Massachusetts, U.S.	
58	Win	16–3–1 (38)	Johnny Wilson	PTS	10	Feb 12, 1924	Mechanics Building, Boston, Massachusetts, U.S.	
57	Loss	15–3–1 (38)	Harry Greb	PTS	10	Dec 25, 1923	Motor Square Garden, Pittsburgh, Pennsylvania, U.S.	
56	Win	15–2–1 (38)	Roland Todd	PTS	10	Dec 10, 1923	Madison Square Garden, New York City, New York, U.S.	
55	Win	14–2–1 (38)	Ted Moore	PTS	10	Nov 14, 1923	Mechanics Building, Boston, Massachusetts, U.S.	
54	Win	13–2–1 (38)	Harry Greb	PTS	10	Oct 11, 1923	Mechanics Building, Boston, Massachusetts, U.S.	
53	Draw	12–2–1 (38)	Jimmy Delaney	PTS	12	Sep 14, 1923	Coliseum, Oklahoma City, Oklahoma, U.S.	
52	Win	12–2 (38)	Teddy Taylor	KO	2 (10)	Aug 14, 1923	Baseball Park, Minersville, Pennsylvania, U.S.	
51	Loss	11–2 (38)	Mike McTigue	NWS	12	Aug 2, 1923	Playgrounds Stadium, West New York, New Jersey, U.S.	NYSAC and NBA light-heavyweight titles at stake; (via KO only)
50	Win	11–2 (37)	Mike McTigue	NWS	8	Jun 25, 1923	Shetzline Ballpark, Philadelphia, Pennsylvania, U.S.	NYSAC and NBA light-heavyweight titles at stake; (via KO only)
49	Loss	11–2 (36)	Jeff Smith	NWS	8	Jun 18, 1923	Shibe Park, Philadelphia, Pennsylvania, U.S.	
48	Win	11–2 (35)	Jeff Smith	NWS	10	Mar 8, 1923	109th Infantry Armory, Scranton, Pennsylvania, U.S.	
47	Loss	11–2 (34)	Harry Greb	UD	15	Jan 30, 1923	Madison Square Garden, New York City, New York, U.S.	For ABA light-heavyweight title
46	Loss	11–1 (34)	Harry Greb	NWS	10	Jan 15, 1923	Motor Square Garden, Pittsburgh, Pennsylvania, U.S.	
45	Win	11–1 (33)	Pal Reed	NWS	12	Jan 8, 1923	Broad A.C., Newark, New Jersey, U.S.	
44	Loss	11–1 (32)	Lou Bogash	NWS	8	Dec 11, 1922	Arena, Philadelphia, Pennsylvania, U.S.	
43	Win	11–1 (31)	George Shade	NWS	8	Sep 25, 1922	Olympia A.C., Philadelphia, Pennsylvania, U.S.	
42	Loss	11–1 (30)	Gene Tunney	NWS	8	Aug 24, 1922	Shibe Park, Philadelphia, Pennsylvania, U.S.	
41	Loss	11–1 (29)	Harry Greb	NWS	8	Jul 10, 1922	Shibe Park, Philadelphia, Pennsylvania, U.S.	
40	Win	11–1 (28)	Young Fisher	PTS	12	May 12, 1922	Arena, Syracuse, New York, U.S.	
39	Win	10–1 (28)	Jimmy Darcy	UD	12	Apr 28, 1922	Arena, Syracuse, New York, U.S.	
38	Win	9–1 (28)	Frank Carbone	NWS	8	Apr 6, 1922	Ice Palace, Philadelphia, Pennsylvania, U.S.	
37	Win	9–1 (27)	Jackie Clark	NWS	8	Mar 21, 1922	Ice Palace, Philadelphia, Pennsylvania, U.S.	
36	Win	9–1 (26)	Mike McTigue	NWS	10	Mar 16, 1922	Town Hall, Scranton, Pennsylvania, U.S.	
35	Win	9–1 (25)	Bryan Downey	NWS	8	Feb 28, 1922	Ice Palace, Philadelphia, Pennsylvania, U.S.	
34	Win	9–1 (24)	Fay Keiser	NWS	8	Feb 7, 1922	Ice Palace, Philadelphia, Pennsylvania, U.S.	
33	Win	9–1 (23)	Jimmy Darcy	NWS	8	Jan 24, 1922	Ice Palace, Philadelphia, Pennsylvania, U.S.	
32	Win	9–1 (22)	Vincent Lopez	TKO	5 (8)	Dec 20, 1921	Ice Palace, Philadelphia, Pennsylvania, U.S.	
31	Win	8–1 (22)	Len Rowlands	NWS	6	Nov 8, 1921	Ice Palace, Philadelphia, Pennsylvania, U.S.	
30	Win	8–1 (21)	Pat Bradley	NWS	6	Oct 6, 1921	Ice Palace, Philadelphia, Pennsylvania, U.S.	
29	Win	8–1 (20)	Alex Miller	NWS	8	Sep 30, 1921	Cambria A.C., Philadelphia, Pennsylvania, U.S.	
28	Win	8–1 (19)	Roy Hurst	KO	3 (8)	Sep 17, 1921	National A.C., Philadelphia, Pennsylvania, U.S.	
27	Win	7–1 (19)	Frankie Britton	NWS	8	Sep 6, 1921	11th Street Arena, Philadelphia, Pennsylvania, U.S.	
26	Loss	7–1 (18)	Frankie Britton	NWS	6	Aug 15, 1921	11th Street Arena, Philadelphia, Pennsylvania, U.S.	
25	Win	7–1 (17)	Jule Ritchie	NWS	10	May 23, 1921	Maple Grove Park, Lancaster, Pennsylvania, U.S.	
24	Win	7–1 (16)	Alex Costica	NWS	8	May 9, 1921	National A.C., Philadelphia, Pennsylvania, U.S.	
23	Win	7–1 (15)	Jack Fink	TKO	4 (8)	May 3, 1921	Auditorium A.A., Philadelphia, Pennsylvania, U.S.	
22	Win	6–1 (15)	Jack Reck	NWS	8	Apr 15, 1921	Armory, Reading, Pennsylvania, U.S.	
21	Draw	6–1 (14)	Charlie O'Neill	NWS	8	Mar 29, 1921	Auditorium A.A., Philadelphia, Pennsylvania, U.S.	
20	Win	6–1 (13)	Leo Dillon	NWS	6	Mar 12, 1921	National A.C., Philadelphia, Pennsylvania, U.S.	
19	Win	6–1 (12)	Johnny McLaughlin	NWS	8	Mar 1, 1921	Auditorium A.A., Philadelphia, Pennsylvania, U.S.	
18	Win	6–1 (11)	Al Nelson	PTS	10	Feb 21, 1921	Bob Wright's Coliseum, Highlandtown, Maryland, U.S.	
17	Win	5–1 (11)	Johnny Kelly	NWS	8	Feb 8, 1921	Auditorium A.A., Philadelphia, Pennsylvania, U.S.	
16	Win	5–1 (10)	Hugh Blair	KO	2 (6)	Feb 1, 1921	Auditorium A.A., Philadelphia, Pennsylvania, U.S.	
15	Win	4–1 (10)	Jack Renzo	PTS	8	Jan 25, 1921	Ardmore, Maryland, U.S.	
14	Win	3–1 (10)	Kid West	NWS	8	Jan 11, 1921	Auditorium A.A., Philadelphia, Pennsylvania, U.S.	
13	Win	3–1 (9)	Lew Schupp	NWS	8	Jan 1, 1921	Fulton Opera House, Lancaster, Pennsylvania, U.S.	
12	Win	3–1 (8)	Rube Bennett	NWS	8	Nov 15, 1920	Fulton Opera House, Lancaster, Pennsylvania, U.S.	
11	Loss	3–1 (7)	Johnny Viggi	TKO	5 (8)	Jul 19, 1920	Knickerbocker A.C., Philadelphia, Pennsylvania, U.S.	Loughran suffered a broken rib and was unable to continue
10	Win	3–0 (7)	Joe Smith	KO	2 (6)	Jul 6, 1920	Knickerbocker A.C., Philadelphia, Pennsylvania, U.S.	
9	Win	2–0 (7)	Tommy Coyle	KO	4 (6)	Jun 18, 1920	National A.C., Philadelphia, Pennsylvania, U.S.	
8	Win	1–0 (7)	Bernie McLaughlin	NWS	6	Jun 3, 1920	Madison A.C., Philadelphia, Pennsylvania, U.S.	
7	Win	1–0 (6)	Johnny Dougherty	NWS	6	May 7, 1920	Cambria A.C., Philadelphia, Pennsylvania, U.S.	
6	Draw	1–0 (5)	Johnny Dougherty	NWS	6	Apr 9, 1920	Cambria A.C., Philadelphia, Pennsylvania, U.S.	
5	Win	1–0 (4)	Philadelphia Joe Welling	NWS	6	Mar 26, 1920	Cambria A.C., Philadelphia, Pennsylvania, U.S.	
4	Loss	1–0 (3)	Happy Jack McWilliams	NWS	6	Feb 17, 1920	Auditorium A.C., Philadelphia, Pennsylvania, U.S.	
3	Win	1–0 (2)	Jim McBride	NWS	6	Jan 27, 1920	Auditorium A.C., Philadelphia, Pennsylvania, U.S.	
2	NC	1–0 (1)	Kid Emanuel	NC	4 (6)	Jan 1, 1920	Auditorium A.C., Philadelphia, Pennsylvania, U.S.	
1	Win	1–0	Eddie Carter	KO	2 (6)	Dec 9, 1919	Auditorium A.C., Philadelphia, Pennsylvania, U.S.	

=== Unofficial record ===
170 fights	124 wins	33 losses
By knockout	14	3
By decision	109	30
By disqualification	1	0
Draws	12	
No contests	1	

Record with the inclusion of newspaper decisions in the win/loss/draw column.

No.	Result	Record	Opponent	Type	Round	Date	Location	Notes
170	Win	124–33–12 (1)	Sonny Boy Walker	UD	10	Jan 18, 1937	Arena, Philadelphia, Pennsylvania, U.S.	
169	Loss	123–33–12 (1)	Sonny Boy Walker	PTS	10	Dec 9, 1936	Civic Auditorium, San Francisco, California, U.S.	
168	Win	123–32–12 (1)	Tom Beaupre	UD	10	Dec 3, 1936	Sportatorium, Dallas, Texas, U.S.	
167	Win	122–32–12 (1)	Alfred Rogers	PTS	10	Nov 13, 1936	Coliseum, San Diego, California, U.S.	
166	Win	121–32–12 (1)	Tony Rossalia	KO	3 (10)	Oct 9, 1936	Chestnut St. Arena, Reno, Nevada, U.S.	
165	Win	120–32–12 (1)	Ray Impelletiere	PTS	10	Sep 16, 1936	Auditorium, Oakland, California, U.S.	
164	Draw	119–32–12 (1)	Al McCoy	PTS	12	Jul 30, 1936	Delormier Stadium, Montreal, Quebec, Canada	
163	Loss	119–32–11 (1)	Al McCoy	PTS	10	Jul 6, 1936	Delormier Stadium, Montreal, Quebec, Canada	Not to be confused with Al McCoy
162	Win	119–31–11 (1)	Jack London	PTS	10	Mar 16, 1936	Colston Hall, Bristol, Avon, England, U.K.	
161	Loss	118–31–11 (1)	Ben Foord	PTS	12	Feb 10, 1936	Granby Halls, Leicester, Leicestershire, England, U.K.	
160	Loss	118–30–11 (1)	Tommy Farr	PTS	10	Jan 15, 1936	Royal Albert Hall, Kensington, London, England, U.K.	
159	Draw	118–29–11 (1)	Andre Lenglet	PTS	10	Dec 9, 1935	Palais des Sports, Paris, Paris, France	
158	Win	118–29–10 (1)	Maurice Strickland	PTS	10	Nov 12, 1935	Wembley Arena, Wembley, London, England, U.K.	
157	Draw	117–29–10 (1)	Al Delaney	MD	6	Aug 22, 1935	Offermann Stadium, Buffalo, New York, U.S.	
156	Win	117–29–9 (1)	Eddie Simms	SD	10	Jul 29, 1935	Maple Leaf Stadium, Toronto, Ontario, Canada	
155	Win	116–29–9 (1)	Ray Impelletiere	UD	10	Jun 20, 1935	Baker Bowl, Philadelphia, Pennsylvania, U.S.	
154	Win	115–29–9 (1)	Al Ettore	MD	10	May 20, 1935	Arena, Philadelphia, Pennsylvania, U.S.	Won vacant Pennsylvania State heavyweight title
153	Win	114–29–9 (1)	Vicente Parrile	TKO	9 (10)	Apr 14, 1935	Plaza de Toros de Acho, Lima, Peru	
152	Loss	113–29–9 (1)	Arturo Godoy	PTS	10	Mar 17, 1935	Campos de Sports de Ñuñoa, Santiago de Chile, Chile	
151	Draw	113–28–9 (1)	Jose Carattoli	MD	12	Feb 2, 1935	Estadio Luna Park, Buenos Aires, Distrito Federal, Argentina	
150	Win	113–28–8 (1)	Arturo Godoy	UD	12	Jan 5, 1935	Estadio Luna Park, Buenos Aires, Distrito Federal, Argentina	
149	Draw	112–28–8 (1)	Arturo Godoy	PTS	12	Oct 20, 1934	Estadio Luna Park, Buenos Aires, Distrito Federal, Argentina	
148	Loss	112–28–7 (1)	Jose Carattoli	UD	12	Oct 6, 1934	Estadio Luna Park, Buenos Aires, Distrito Federal, Argentina	
147	Loss	112–27–7 (1)	Johnny Risko	UD	10	Aug 1, 1934	Municipal Stadium, Freeport, New York, U.S.	
146	Loss	112–26–7 (1)	Walter Neusel	SD	10	May 4, 1934	Madison Square Garden, New York City, New York, U.S.	
145	Loss	112–25–7 (1)	Primo Carnera	UD	15	Mar 1, 1934	Madison Square Garden Stadium, Miami, Florida, U.S.	For NYSAC, NBA, and The Ring heavyweight titles
144	Win	112–24–7 (1)	Ray Impelletiere	PTS	10	Nov 22, 1933	New York Coliseum, New York City, New York, U.S.	
143	Win	111–24–7 (1)	Jack Sharkey	SD	15	Sep 27, 1933	Shibe Park, Philadelphia, Pennsylvania, U.S.	
142	Loss	110–24–7 (1)	Johnny Risko	SD	10	Jul 26, 1933	Mills Stadium, Chicago, Illinois, U.S.	
141	Win	110–23–7 (1)	Steve Hamas	UD	10	Jun 21, 1933	Yankee Stadium, New York City, New York, U.S.	
140	Win	109–23–7 (1)	Isidoro Gastanaga	PTS	10	Apr 21, 1933	Chicago Stadium, Chicago, Illinois, U.S.	
139	Win	108–23–7 (1)	Walter Cobb	UD	10	Feb 13, 1933	Arena, Philadelphia, Pennsylvania, U.S.	
138	Win	107–23–7 (1)	King Levinsky	UD	10	Jan 10, 1933	Convention Hall, Philadelphia, Pennsylvania, U.S.	
137	Loss	106–23–7 (1)	Stanley Poreda	UD	10	Oct 17, 1932	Arena, Philadelphia, Pennsylvania, U.S.	
136	Win	106–22–7 (1)	Steve Hamas	SD	10	Jun 29, 1932	Shibe Park, Philadelphia, Pennsylvania, U.S.	
135	Loss	105–22–7 (1)	Steve Hamas	SD	10	May 11, 1932	Convention Hall, Philadelphia, Pennsylvania, U.S.	
134	Loss	105–21–7 (1)	Steve Hamas	TKO	2 (10)	Jan 15, 1932	Madison Square Garden, New York City, New York, U.S.	
133	Loss	105–20–7 (1)	King Levinsky	UD	10	Dec 18, 1931	Madison Square Garden, New York City, New York, U.S.	
132	Win	105–19–7 (1)	Paulino Uzcudun	SD	10	Nov 13, 1931	Madison Square Garden, New York City, New York, U.S.	
131	Win	104–19–7 (1)	Johnny Risko	PTS	10	Oct 19, 1931	Arena, Philadelphia, Pennsylvania, U.S.	
130	Loss	103–19–7 (1)	Joe Sekyra	MD	10	Sep 22, 1931	Queensboro Stadium, Long Island City, New York City, New York, U.S.	
129	Win	103–18–7 (1)	Jack Gross	UD	10	Sep 9, 1931	Baker Bowl, Philadelphia, Pennsylvania, U.S.	
128	Win	102–18–7 (1)	Victorio Campolo	UD	10	May 15, 1931	Madison Square Garden, New York City, New York, U.S.	
127	Win	101–18–7 (1)	Tuffy Griffiths	MD	10	Mar 27, 1931	Chicago Stadium, Chicago, Illinois, U.S.	
126	Win	100–18–7 (1)	Ernie Schaaf	UD	10	Mar 13, 1931	Madison Square Garden, New York City, New York, U.S.	
125	Win	99–18–7 (1)	Max Baer	UD	10	Feb 6, 1931	Madison Square Garden, New York City, New York, U.S.	
124	Win	98–18–7 (1)	Jack Gross	PTS	10	Jan 26, 1931	Arena, Philadelphia, Pennsylvania, U.S.	
123	Win	97–18–7 (1)	King Levinsky	UD	10	Nov 21, 1930	Chicago Stadium, Chicago, Illinois, U.S.	
122	Win	96–18–7 (1)	Dave Maier	PTS	10	Oct 23, 1930	Auditorium, Milwaukee, Wisconsin, U.S.	
121	Win	95–18–7 (1)	Dick Daniels	NWS	10	Oct 16, 1930	Auditorium, Minneapolis, Minnesota, U.S.	
120	Loss	94–18–7 (1)	Ernie Schaaf	UD	10	Jun 11, 1930	Sesquicentennial Stadium, Philadelphia, Pennsylvania, U.S.	
119	Loss	94–17–7 (1)	Ernie Schaaf	SD	10	Apr 28, 1930	Arena, Philadelphia, Pennsylvania, U.S.	
118	Win	94–16–7 (1)	Jack Renault	UD	10	Mar 17, 1930	Arena, Philadelphia, Pennsylvania, U.S.	
117	Win	93–16–7 (1)	Pierre Charles	PTS	10	Feb 27, 1930	Madison Square Garden Stadium, Miami, Florida, U.S.	
116	Loss	92–16–7 (1)	Jack Sharkey	TKO	3 (15)	Sep 26, 1929	Yankee Stadium, New York City, New York, U.S.	For vacant ABA heavyweight title
115	Win	92–15–7 (1)	James J. Braddock	UD	15	Jul 18, 1929	Yankee Stadium, New York City, New York, U.S.	Retained NYSAC, NBA, and The Ring light-heavyweight titles
114	Win	91–15–7 (1)	Ernie Schaaf	PTS	10	May 24, 1929	Boston Garden, Boston, Massachusetts, U.S.	
113	Win	90–15–7 (1)	Mickey Walker	SD	10	Mar 28, 1929	Chicago Stadium, Chicago, Illinois, U.S.	Retained NYSAC, NBA, and The Ring light-heavyweight titles
112	Win	89–15–7 (1)	Joe Lohman	PTS	10	Feb 20, 1929	Convention Hall, Tulsa, Oklahoma, U.S.	
111	Win	88–15–7 (1)	Armand Emanuel	PTS	10	Feb 5, 1929	Olympic Auditorium, Los Angeles, California, U.S.	
110	Win	87–15–7 (1)	Big Boy Peterson	PTS	10	Dec 17, 1928	Coliseum, Chicago, Illinois, U.S.	
109	Win	86–15–7 (1)	Jack Gross	PTS	10	Oct 1, 1928	Baker Bowl, Philadelphia, Pennsylvania, U.S.	
108	Win	85–15–7 (1)	Pete Latzo	UD	10	Jul 16, 1928	Artillery Park, Wilkes-Barre, Pennsylvania, U.S.	Retained NYSAC, NBA, and The Ring light-heavyweight titles
107	Win	84–15–7 (1)	Armand Emanuel	UD	10	Jun 28, 1928	Madison Square Garden, New York City, New York, U.S.	
106	Win	83–15–7 (1)	Pete Latzo	UD	15	Jun 1, 1928	Ebbets Field, New York City, New York, U.S.	Retained NYSAC, NBA, and The Ring light-heavyweight titles
105	Win	82–15–7 (1)	Joe Sekyra	NWS	10	May 18, 1928	Jefferson County Armory, Louisville, Kentucky, U.S.	
104	Win	81–15–7 (1)	Leo Lomski	UD	15	Jan 6, 1928	Madison Square Garden, New York City, New York, U.S.	Retained NYSAC, NBA, and The Ring light-heavyweight titles
103	Win	80–15–7 (1)	Jimmy Slattery	MD	15	Dec 12, 1927	Madison Square Garden, New York City, New York, U.S.	Retained NYSAC light-heavyweight title; Won NBA and vacant The Ring light-heavyweight titles
102	Win	79–15–7 (1)	Pat McCarthy	PTS	10	Nov 14, 1927	Arena, Philadelphia, Pennsylvania, U.S.	
101	Win	78–15–7 (1)	Mike McTigue	UD	15	Oct 7, 1927	Madison Square Garden, New York City, New York, U.S.	Won NYSAC light-heavyweight title
100	Win	77–15–7 (1)	Benny Ross	MD	12	Aug 8, 1927	Broadway Auditorium, Buffalo, New York, U.S.	
99	Win	76–15–7 (1)	Tony Marullo	PTS	10	Jul 20, 1927	Queensboro Stadium, Long Island City, New York City, New York, U.S.	
98	Win	75–15–7 (1)	Young Stribling	UD	10	May 3, 1927	Ebbets Field, New York City, New York, U.S.	
97	Win	74–15–7 (1)	Tom Kirby	PTS	10	Apr 6, 1927	108th Field Artillery Armory, Philadelphia, Pennsylvania, U.S.	
96	Win	73–15–7 (1)	Joe Lohman	PTS	10	Mar 16, 1927	108th Field Artillery Armory, Philadelphia, Pennsylvania, U.S.	
95	Win	72–15–7 (1)	Johnny Risko	UD	10	Feb 15, 1927	South Main Street Armory, Wilkes-Barre, Pennsylvania, U.S.	
94	Win	71–15–7 (1)	Tony Marullo	UD	10	Jan 10, 1927	Arena, Philadelphia, Pennsylvania, U.S.	
93	Win	70–15–7 (1)	George Manley	NWS	10	Nov 29, 1926	Tomlinson Hall, Indianapolis, Indiana, U.S.	
92	Win	69–15–7 (1)	Chuck Wiggins	DQ	5 (10)	Oct 29, 1926	Providence, Rhode Island, U.S.	
91	Win	68–15–7 (1)	Martin Burke	PTS	10	Oct 18, 1926	Madison Gardens, Chicago, Illinois, U.S.	
90	Win	67–15–7 (1)	Frankie Schramm	KO	2 (10)	Oct 8, 1926	Manhattan Auditorium, Allentown, Pennsylvania, U.S.	
89	Win	66–15–7 (1)	Johnny Risko	PTS	6	Sep 23, 1926	Sesquicentennial Stadium, Philadelphia, Pennsylvania, U.S.	
88	Win	65–15–7 (1)	Johnny Risko	PTS	10	Jul 30, 1926	Mechanics Building, Boston, Massachusetts, U.S.	
87	Win	64–15–7 (1)	George Manley	PTS	10	Jul 2, 1926	League Park, Omaha, Nebraska, U.S.	
86	Win	63–15–7 (1)	Georges Carpentier	UD	10	Jun 17, 1926	Sesquicentennial Stadium, Philadelphia, Pennsylvania, U.S.	
85	Win	62–15–7 (1)	Tom Kirby	PTS	10	Apr 13, 1926	Arena, Boston, Massachusetts, U.S.	
84	Win	61–15–7 (1)	Yale Okun	UD	10	Apr 5, 1926	Arena, Philadelphia, Pennsylvania, U.S.	
83	Win	60–15–7 (1)	Yale Okun	UD	10	Mar 15, 1926	Arena, Philadelphia, Pennsylvania, U.S.	
82	Win	59–15–7 (1)	Chuck Wiggins	NWS	10	Feb 12, 1926	Armory, Grand Rapids, Michigan, U.S.	
81	Win	58–15–7 (1)	Ad Stone	PTS	10	Feb 8, 1926	Arena, Philadelphia, Pennsylvania, U.S.	
80	Win	57–15–7 (1)	Joe Packo	NWS	10	Jan 6, 1926	Armory, Grand Rapids, Michigan, U.S.	
79	Win	56–15–7 (1)	Billy Freas	NWS	10	Jan 1, 1926	Armory, Grand Rapids, Michigan, U.S.	
78	Win	55–15–7 (1)	Emilio Solomon	PTS	10	Dec 25, 1925	Arena, Philadelphia, Pennsylvania, U.S.	
77	Loss	54–15–7 (1)	Ad Stone	PTS	10	Oct 26, 1925	Arena, Philadelphia, Pennsylvania, U.S.	
76	Win	54–14–7 (1)	Benny Ross	PTS	10	Oct 5, 1925	Broadway Auditorium, Buffalo, New York, U.S.	
75	Win	53–14–7 (1)	Jack Burke	TKO	6 (10)	Sep 24, 1925	Shibe Park, Philadelphia, Pennsylvania, U.S.	
74	Win	52–14–7 (1)	Tony Marullo	UD	8	Sep 11, 1925	Yankee Stadium, New York City, New York, U.S.	
73	Draw	51–14–7 (1)	Jack Delaney	PTS	10	Jul 16, 1925	Shibe Park, Philadelphia, Pennsylvania, U.S.	
72	Win	51–14–6 (1)	Martin Burke	PTS	12	Jun 11, 1925	Dexter Park Stadium, Woodhaven, New York City, New York, U.S.	
71	Loss	50–14–6 (1)	Young Stribling	PTS	10	Mar 28, 1925	Recreation Park, San Francisco, California, U.S.	
70	Win	50–13–6 (1)	Jack Reeves	PTS	10	Feb 18, 1925	Auditorium, Oakland, California, U.S.	
69	Win	49–13–6 (1)	Billy Freas	PTS	10	Feb 7, 1925	Culver City Stadium, Culver City, California, U.S.	
68	Draw	48–13–6 (1)	Buck Holley	PTS	6	Feb 4, 1925	Auditorium, Oakland, California, U.S.	
67	Win	48–13–5 (1)	Frankie Maguire	PTS	10	Jan 1, 1925	Armory, Williamsport, Pennsylvania, U.S.	
66	Win	47–13–5 (1)	George Blake	KO	2 (10)	Nov 20, 1924	Armory, Williamsport, Pennsylvania, U.S.	
65	Draw	46–13–5 (1)	Harry Greb	SD	10	Oct 13, 1924	Arena, Philadelphia, Pennsylvania, U.S.	
64	Win	46–13–4 (1)	Joe Lohman	PTS	10	Jul 11, 1924	Erie Arena, Erie, Pennsylvania, U.S.	
63	Loss	45–13–4 (1)	Young Stribling	PTS	6	Jun 26, 1924	Yankee Stadium, New York City, New York, U.S.	
62	Win	45–12–4 (1)	Jack Smith	KO	2 (10)	Jun 16, 1924	Moose Hall, Shamokin, Pennsylvania, U.S.	
61	Draw	44–12–4 (1)	Ad Stone	PTS	10	May 19, 1924	Shetzline Ballpark, Philadelphia, Pennsylvania, U.S.	
60	Win	44–12–3 (1)	Charley Nashert	NWS	10	Apr 28, 1924	Danceland Arena, Detroit, Michigan, U.S.	
59	Loss	43–12–3 (1)	Jack Delaney	PTS	10	Feb 19, 1924	Mechanics Building, Boston, Massachusetts, U.S.	
58	Win	43–11–3 (1)	Johnny Wilson	PTS	10	Feb 12, 1924	Mechanics Building, Boston, Massachusetts, U.S.	
57	Loss	42–11–3 (1)	Harry Greb	PTS	10	Dec 25, 1923	Motor Square Garden, Pittsburgh, Pennsylvania, U.S.	
56	Win	42–10–3 (1)	Roland Todd	PTS	10	Dec 10, 1923	Madison Square Garden, New York City, New York, U.S.	
55	Win	41–10–3 (1)	Ted Moore	PTS	10	Nov 14, 1923	Mechanics Building, Boston, Massachusetts, U.S.	
54	Win	40–10–3 (1)	Harry Greb	PTS	10	Oct 11, 1923	Mechanics Building, Boston, Massachusetts, U.S.	
53	Draw	39–10–3 (1)	Jimmy Delaney	PTS	12	Sep 14, 1923	Coliseum, Oklahoma City, Oklahoma, U.S.	
52	Win	39–10–2 (1)	Teddy Taylor	KO	2 (10)	Aug 14, 1923	Baseball Park, Minersville, Pennsylvania, U.S.	
51	Loss	38–10–2 (1)	Mike McTigue	NWS	12	Aug 2, 1923	Playgrounds Stadium, West New York, New Jersey, U.S.	NYSAC and NBA light-heavyweight titles at stake; (via KO only)
50	Win	38–9–2 (1)	Mike McTigue	NWS	8	Jun 25, 1923	Shetzline Ballpark, Philadelphia, Pennsylvania, U.S.	NYSAC and NBA light-heavyweight titles at stake; (via KO only)
49	Loss	37–9–2 (1)	Jeff Smith	NWS	8	Jun 18, 1923	Shibe Park, Philadelphia, Pennsylvania, U.S.	
48	Win	37–8–2 (1)	Jeff Smith	NWS	10	Mar 8, 1923	109th Infantry Armory, Scranton, Pennsylvania, U.S.	
47	Loss	36–8–2 (1)	Harry Greb	UD	15	Jan 30, 1923	Madison Square Garden, New York City, New York, U.S.	For ABA light-heavyweight title
46	Loss	36–7–2 (1)	Harry Greb	NWS	10	Jan 15, 1923	Motor Square Garden, Pittsburgh, Pennsylvania, U.S.	
45	Win	36–6–2 (1)	Pal Reed	NWS	12	Jan 8, 1923	Broad A.C., Newark, New Jersey, U.S.	
44	Loss	35–6–2 (1)	Lou Bogash	NWS	8	Dec 11, 1922	Arena, Philadelphia, Pennsylvania, U.S.	
43	Win	35–5–2 (1)	George Shade	NWS	8	Sep 25, 1922	Olympia A.C., Philadelphia, Pennsylvania, U.S.	
42	Loss	34–5–2 (1)	Gene Tunney	NWS	8	Aug 24, 1922	Shibe Park, Philadelphia, Pennsylvania, U.S.	
41	Loss	34–4–2 (1)	Harry Greb	NWS	8	Jul 10, 1922	Shibe Park, Philadelphia, Pennsylvania, U.S.	
40	Win	34–3–2 (1)	Young Fisher	PTS	12	May 12, 1922	Arena, Syracuse, New York, U.S.	
39	Win	33–3–2 (1)	Jimmy Darcy	UD	12	Apr 28, 1922	Arena, Syracuse, New York, U.S.	
38	Win	32–3–2 (1)	Frank Carbone	NWS	8	Apr 6, 1922	Ice Palace, Philadelphia, Pennsylvania, U.S.	
37	Win	31–3–2 (1)	Jackie Clark	NWS	8	Mar 21, 1922	Ice Palace, Philadelphia, Pennsylvania, U.S.	
36	Win	30–3–2 (1)	Mike McTigue	NWS	10	Mar 16, 1922	Town Hall, Scranton, Pennsylvania, U.S.	
35	Win	29–3–2 (1)	Bryan Downey	NWS	8	Feb 28, 1922	Ice Palace, Philadelphia, Pennsylvania, U.S.	
34	Win	28–3–2 (1)	Fay Keiser	NWS	8	Feb 7, 1922	Ice Palace, Philadelphia, Pennsylvania, U.S.	
33	Win	27–3–2 (1)	Jimmy Darcy	NWS	8	Jan 24, 1922	Ice Palace, Philadelphia, Pennsylvania, U.S.	
32	Win	26–3–2 (1)	Vincent Lopez	TKO	5 (8)	Dec 20, 1921	Ice Palace, Philadelphia, Pennsylvania, U.S.	
31	Win	25–3–2 (1)	Len Rowlands	NWS	6	Nov 8, 1921	Ice Palace, Philadelphia, Pennsylvania, U.S.	
30	Win	24–3–2 (1)	Pat Bradley	NWS	6	Oct 6, 1921	Ice Palace, Philadelphia, Pennsylvania, U.S.	
29	Win	23–3–2 (1)	Alex Miller	NWS	8	Sep 30, 1921	Cambria A.C., Philadelphia, Pennsylvania, U.S.	
28	Win	22–3–2 (1)	Roy Hurst	KO	3 (8)	Sep 17, 1921	National A.C., Philadelphia, Pennsylvania, U.S.	
27	Win	21–3–2 (1)	Frankie Britton	NWS	8	Sep 6, 1921	11th Street Arena, Philadelphia, Pennsylvania, U.S.	
26	Loss	20–3–2 (1)	Frankie Britton	NWS	6	Aug 15, 1921	11th Street Arena, Philadelphia, Pennsylvania, U.S.	
25	Win	20–2–2 (1)	Jule Ritchie	NWS	10	May 23, 1921	Maple Grove Park, Lancaster, Pennsylvania, U.S.	
24	Win	19–2–2 (1)	Alex Costica	NWS	8	May 9, 1921	National A.C., Philadelphia, Pennsylvania, U.S.	
23	Win	18–2–2 (1)	Jack Fink	TKO	4 (8)	May 3, 1921	Auditorium A.A., Philadelphia, Pennsylvania, U.S.	
22	Win	17–2–2 (1)	Jack Reck	NWS	8	Apr 15, 1921	Armory, Reading, Pennsylvania, U.S.	
21	Draw	16–2–2 (1)	Charlie O'Neill	NWS	8	Mar 29, 1921	Auditorium A.A., Philadelphia, Pennsylvania, U.S.	
20	Win	16–2–1 (1)	Leo Dillon	NWS	6	Mar 12, 1921	National A.C., Philadelphia, Pennsylvania, U.S.	
19	Win	15–2–1 (1)	Johnny McLaughlin	NWS	8	Mar 1, 1921	Auditorium A.A., Philadelphia, Pennsylvania, U.S.	
18	Win	14–2–1 (1)	Al Nelson	PTS	10	Feb 21, 1921	Bob Wright's Coliseum, Highlandtown, Maryland, U.S.	
17	Win	13–2–1 (1)	Johnny Kelly	NWS	8	Feb 8, 1921	Auditorium A.A., Philadelphia, Pennsylvania, U.S.	
16	Win	12–2–1 (1)	Hugh Blair	KO	2 (6)	Feb 1, 1921	Auditorium A.A., Philadelphia, Pennsylvania, U.S.	
15	Win	11–2–1 (1)	Jack Renzo	PTS	8	Jan 25, 1921	Ardmore, Maryland, U.S.	
14	Win	10–2–1 (1)	Kid West	NWS	8	Jan 11, 1921	Auditorium A.A., Philadelphia, Pennsylvania, U.S.	
13	Win	9–2–1 (1)	Lew Schupp	NWS	8	Jan 1, 1921	Fulton Opera House, Lancaster, Pennsylvania, U.S.	
12	Win	8–2–1 (1)	Rube Bennett	NWS	8	Nov 15, 1920	Fulton Opera House, Lancaster, Pennsylvania, U.S.	
11	Loss	7–2–1 (1)	Johnny Viggi	TKO	5 (8)	Jul 19, 1920	Knickerbocker A.C., Philadelphia, Pennsylvania, U.S.	Loughran suffered a broken rib and was unable to continue
10	Win	7–1–1 (1)	Joe Smith	KO	2 (6)	Jul 6, 1920	Knickerbocker A.C., Philadelphia, Pennsylvania, U.S.	
9	Win	6–1–1 (1)	Tommy Coyle	KO	4 (6)	Jun 18, 1920	National A.C., Philadelphia, Pennsylvania, U.S.	
8	Win	5–1–1 (1)	Bernie McLaughlin	NWS	6	Jun 3, 1920	Madison A.C., Philadelphia, Pennsylvania, U.S.	
7	Win	4–1–1 (1)	Johnny Dougherty	NWS	6	May 7, 1920	Cambria A.C., Philadelphia, Pennsylvania, U.S.	
6	Draw	3–1–1 (1)	Johnny Dougherty	NWS	6	Apr 9, 1920	Cambria A.C., Philadelphia, Pennsylvania, U.S.	
5	Win	3–1 (1)	Philadelphia Joe Welling	NWS	6	Mar 26, 1920	Cambria A.C., Philadelphia, Pennsylvania, U.S.	
4	Loss	2–1 (1)	Happy Jack McWilliams	NWS	6	Feb 17, 1920	Auditorium A.C., Philadelphia, Pennsylvania, U.S.	
3	Win	2–0 (1)	Jim McBride	NWS	6	Jan 27, 1920	Auditorium A.C., Philadelphia, Pennsylvania, U.S.	
2	NC	1–0 (1)	Kid Emanuel	NC	4 (6)	Jan 1, 1920	Auditorium A.C., Philadelphia, Pennsylvania, U.S.	
1	Win	1–0	Eddie Carter	KO	2 (6)	Dec 9, 1919	Auditorium A.C., Philadelphia, Pennsylvania, U.S.	

== Titles in boxing ==
=== Major world titles ===
- NYSAC light heavyweight champion (175 lbs)
- NBA (WBA) light heavyweight champion (175 lbs)

=== The Ring magazine titles ===
- The Ring light heavyweight champion (175 lbs)

=== Regional/International titles ===
- Pennsylvania State heavyweight champion (200+ lbs)

=== Undisputed titles ===
- Undisputed light heavyweight champion

== See also ==
- List of light heavyweight boxing champions

Achievements
Preceded by Mike McTigue	NYSAC World Light Heavyweight Champion; October 7, 1927 – July 18, 1929; Vacated	Vacant Title next held by Jimmy Slattery
Vacant Title last held by Jack Delaney	World Light Heavyweight Champion; October 7, 1927 – July 18, 1929; Vacated	Vacant Title next held by Maxie Rosenbloom
