= Pat Bradley (boxer) =

American boxer (1884–1976)

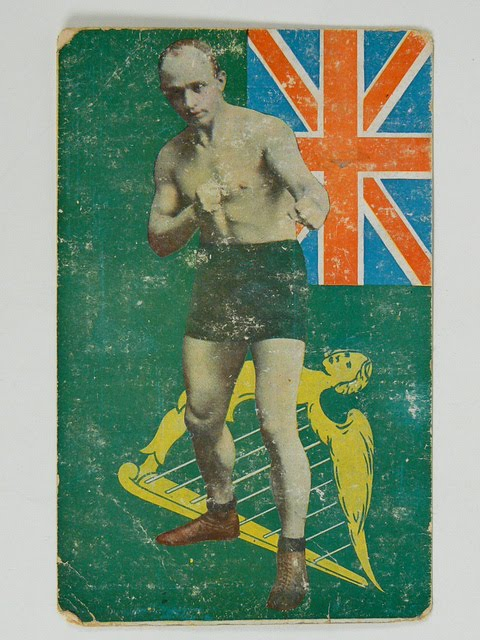

Personal information
- Nationality: British (Note: Every Irish born before 1922 is a British citizen. Ireland was part of the United Kingdom until 1922.); American
- Born: March 3, 1884 Buncrana, County Donegal, Ireland, U.K.
- Died: February 1, 1976 (aged 91) San Francisco, California, U.S.
- Weight: Welterweight

Boxing career
- Stance: Orthodox

Boxing record
- Total fights: 32
- Wins: 15
- Win by KO: 14
- Losses: 12
- Draws: 3
- No contests: 2

Pat Bradley (March 3, 1884 – February 1, 1976) was an Irish boxer who was recognized as the Australian Welterweight World Boxing Champion on March 19, 1913, when he defeated Jack Clarke at Sydney Stadium in New South Wales, Australia. He also contended twice for the Australian Middleweight World Boxing Title in February and April 1914 against Eddie McGoorty, and Jeff Smith.

He won a very impressive fourteen of his fifteen career wins by knockout, and fought mostly on the U. S. West coast at the beginning and near the end of his career.

== Early career ==
Bradley was born on March 3, 1884, in Buncrana, County Donegal, Ireland. He had seven fights in the San Francisco area between 1909 and 1911. In five of his early fights from the spring of 1909 until 1910, he knocked out Willie Carter, Morris Lowenstein, C. F. Clark, and Billy Grupp in the San Francisco area. These were likely short four round bouts as reflected in Bradley's BoxRec record. Longer bouts were less common in California during this period.

Continuing to fight in the San Francisco area, BoxRec had him matched with Buck Crouse, Rufus Williams, Frank Mayfield, and Sailor Bert Bowers. In 1912, he defeated Maurice Flemming, Bill Yank Rudd, and Frenchman Jean Audouy mostly by knockout in Sydney, Australia in full feature bouts scheduled for twenty rounds.

The Sydney Morning Herald wrote of his November 2, 1912, with Audouy, that when Audouy "dropped to his hands and knees" fairly early in the eighth round without receiving a blow, the referee ruled a disqualification, conforming with the articles of the fight. Bradley had landed a blow to Audouy's jaw which staggered him earlier in the round, though he had not fallen. Such incidents probably added to Bradley's reputation as a powerful hitter. One article wrote of Bradley, that "Those swings...were dreadful things to contemplate, and when one landed, there was hardly ever a mistake--the full count followed. And unlike the average fighter, he could not pull a punch: he could not stall." In 1913 he knocked out both Jean Audouy, and Charlie Godfrey in feature fights scheduled for twenty rounds in Sydney Stadium in Sydney.

== Mid career, world welter and middleweight titles ==
On March 19, 1913, he defeated Jack Clarke in a bout which the World Boxing Association later recognized as a World Welterweight Title match at Sydney Stadium in Sydney, Australia in a twelve of twenty round TKO. This championship may have only been recognized in Australia and possibly Great Britain at the time. In September and October 1913, he defeated Jerry Jerome in Sydney, Australia in an eight round knockout, followed by losing to Dave Smith in a twenty round points decision in Sydney Stadium on October 25, 1913. According to Wiki's List of Welterweight Boxing Champions, Bradley lost the Welterweight World Title when he lost to Smith. He had defended it at least twice, first against Sid Stagg on May 10, 1913, and again in his knockout of Jerry Jerome in October.

In February and April 1913, he contended for the World Middleweight title, against the 5' 10" American Wisconsin based boxer, Eddie McGoorty on February 7, 1914, again in Sydney Stadium. He lost the twenty round "Australian version" of the World Middleweight Title, according to the Sydney Morning Herald in a round points decision with both boxers weighing in at just under the 160 pound Middleweight weight limit. The Omaha Daily bee, as likely did many other American papers wrote of Bradley's February 7 loss to McGorty in only brief coverage, and took no note of the bout being a World Middleweight Title bout of any kind. Bradley again fought for the "Australian version" of the World Welterweight title on April 13, 1914, against Jeff Smith, losing more decisively by knockout in the sixteenth round of twenty rounds, also in Sydney Stadium in New South Wales, Australia.

Bradley continued to fight in Australia through February 1916. He returned to the United States, fighting in Reno, Nevada against Anton LeGrave on July 4, 1917. On July 13, 1917, he defeated Frank Barrieau taking the Pacific Coast Middleweight Title in four rounds at the large Dreamland Rink in San Francisco where he had fought earlier in his career before his fights in Sydney, Australia. He continued to fight on the American West Coast through at least August 1920 when he lost to Army Welch on August 18, 1920, in a second round TKO at Liberty Park in Seattle, Washington.

== Boxing achievements ==
Achievements
Unknown	Australian World Welterweight Championship; March 19, 1913 – October 25, 1913	Succeeded by Matt Wells
