= Johnny Risko =

Slovak-born American heavyweight boxer (1902–1953)

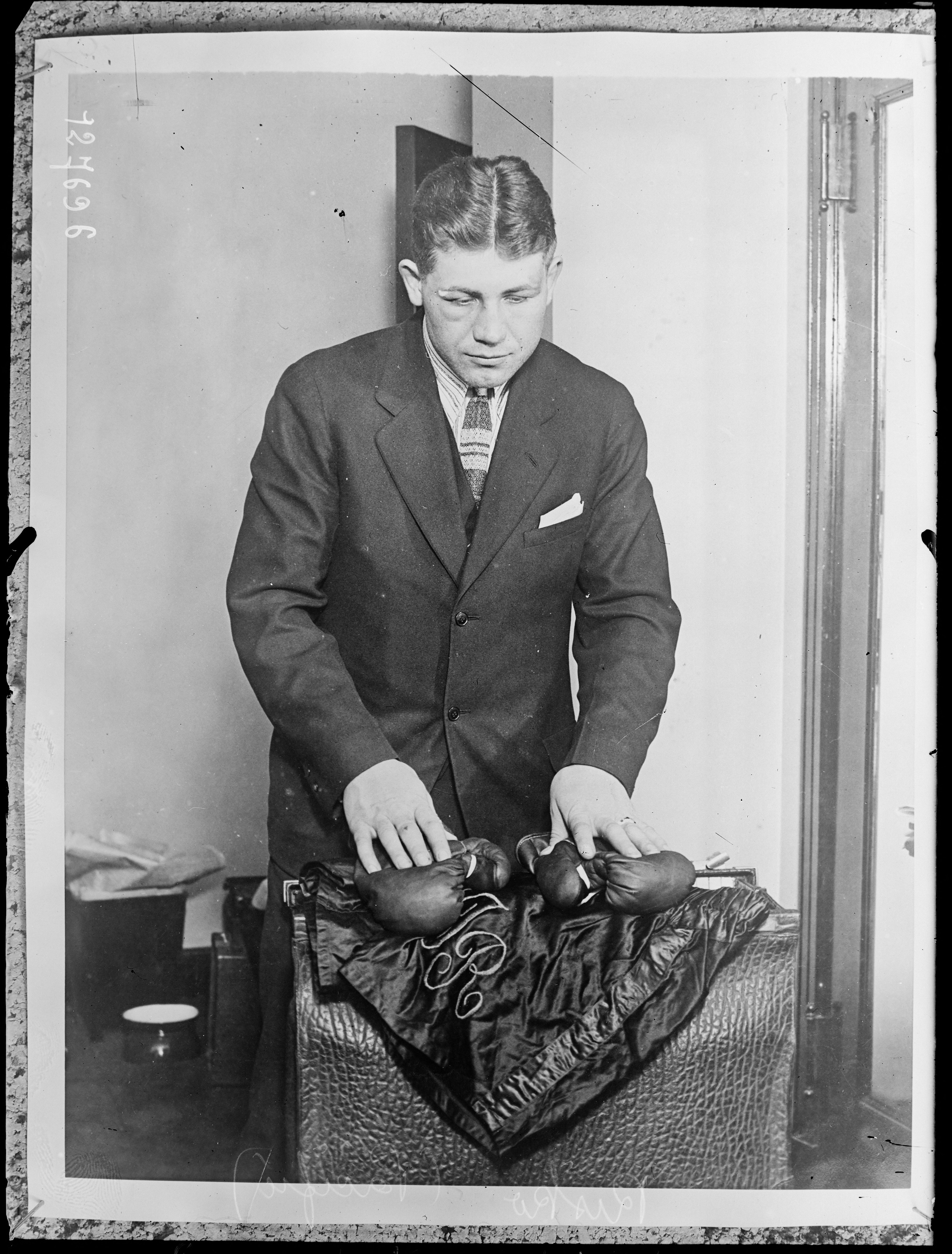
- Risko in 1928

Personal information
- Nickname: Cleveland Rubber Man
- Born: December 18, 1902 Austria-Hungary (present-day Slovakia)
- Died: January 13, 1953 (aged 50) Miami, Florida, U.S.
- Weight: Heavyweight

Boxing career

John "Johnny" Risko (December 18, 1902 – January 13, 1953) was a Slovak-born American professional boxer who competed as a heavyweight. Based in Cleveland, Ohio, Risko became a leading heavyweight contender during the late 1920s and early 1930s and was nicknamed the "Cleveland Rubber Man" for his durability in the ring. Among his notable victories were wins over Jack Sharkey and Max Baer, both of whom later became world heavyweight champions. His 1929 bout with Max Schmeling was named The Ring magazine's Fight of the Year.

== Early life ==
Risko was born in Austria-Hungary, in a region that is now part of Slovakia, to John and Susan Risko. He moved with his family to Cleveland when he was six years old. He left school at the age of eight and began working in a bakery. A friend later introduced him to Cleveland boxing trainer and manager Danny Dunn, under whom Risko began boxing. According to the Encyclopedia of Cleveland History, Risko had 59 amateur bouts, including 39 victories by knockout.

Risko became a naturalized American citizen.

== Boxing career ==
After turning professional, Risko injured his right shoulder during his fourth professional bout. The injury limited his use of the right hand, and his fighting style subsequently relied heavily on aggression and his left hook. His ability to withstand punishment led to the nickname "Cleveland Rubber Man".

On November 18, 1925, Risko fought future world heavyweight champion Gene Tunney in Cleveland. Tunney won the 12-round bout on points, but Risko's performance helped establish his reputation among heavyweight contenders.

Risko's standing rose further on November 25, 1927, when he defeated Spanish heavyweight Paulino Uzcudun in a ten-round bout at Madison Square Garden. The Associated Press described the result as a clear victory and reported that it moved Risko into the front ranks of heavyweight title contenders.

On March 12, 1928, Risko faced Jack Sharkey in a 15-round heavyweight elimination bout at Madison Square Garden. The contest was part of promoter Tex Rickard's effort to determine a challenger for world heavyweight champion Gene Tunney. Risko won the decision after finishing the bout aggressively. In its coverage following the fight, the Associated Press described Risko as one of the foremost challengers for Tunney's championship.

Risko met German contender Max Schmeling at Madison Square Garden on February 1, 1929. Schmeling knocked Risko down several times before the bout was stopped in the ninth round. The victory became an important step in Schmeling's rise toward the world heavyweight championship. Contemporary Associated Press coverage later noted that Risko had previously built a reputation for being exceptionally difficult to stop. Their bout was subsequently selected by The Ring as its 1929 Fight of the Year.

Risko remained among the leading heavyweights after the loss to Schmeling. On June 19, 1930, he again defeated Uzcudun, winning a ten-round decision in Detroit. He later defeated Max Baer, who went on to win the world heavyweight championship in 1934.

On June 24, 1932, Risko defeated former middleweight and welterweight world champion Mickey Walker over 12 rounds in Cleveland. Contemporary reports noted that Risko was awarded the decision after Walker had defeated him in their previous meetings.

Risko continued to compete during the 1930s. Dunn remained his longtime manager, although the two parted ways in 1935 after Dunn advised Risko to retire from boxing.

== Later life and death ==
Risko joined the United States Army in 1942. He had married Margaret E. Yoder in 1930; after their divorce, he married Mildred Weber.

Risko died in Miami, Florida, on January 13, 1953, at the age of 50. He collapsed while attending a meeting at the Miami Elks Club during a winter visit to Florida with his wife. He was buried at Brooklyn Heights Cemetery in Ohio.
