= Jack Sharkey =

Lithuanian-American boxer

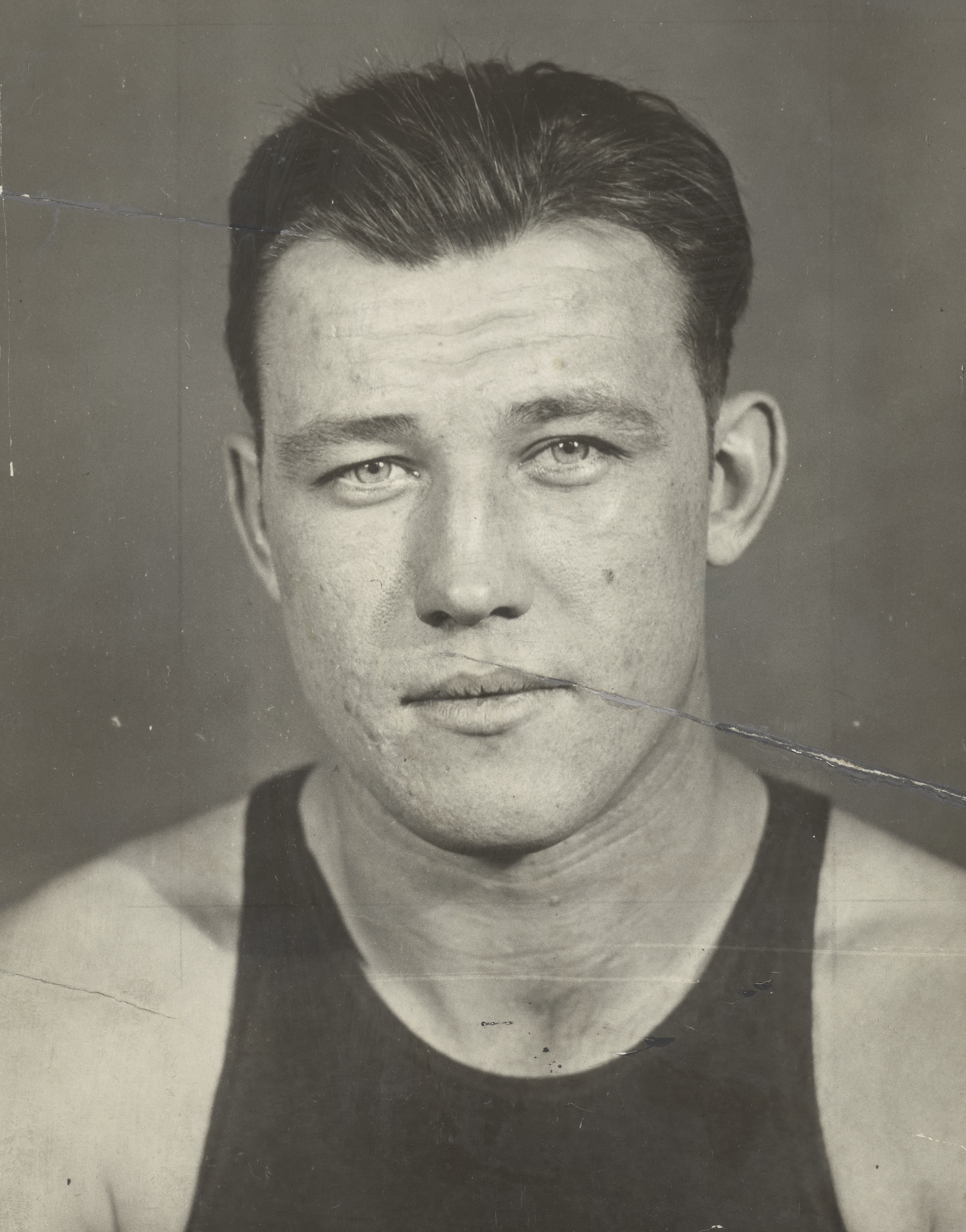
- Sharkey in 1925

Personal information
- Nicknames: Boston Gob, Sharkboy
- Nationality: American
- Born: Joseph Paul Zukauskas; October 26, 1902 Binghamton, New York, U.S.
- Died: August 17, 1994 (aged 91) Beverly, Massachusetts, U.S.
- Height: 5 ft 11.5 in (1.82 m)
- Weight: Heavyweight

Boxing career
- Reach: 72 in (183 cm)
- Stance: Orthodox

Boxing record
- Total fights: 55
- Wins: 38
- Win by KO: 13
- Losses: 14
- Draws: 3

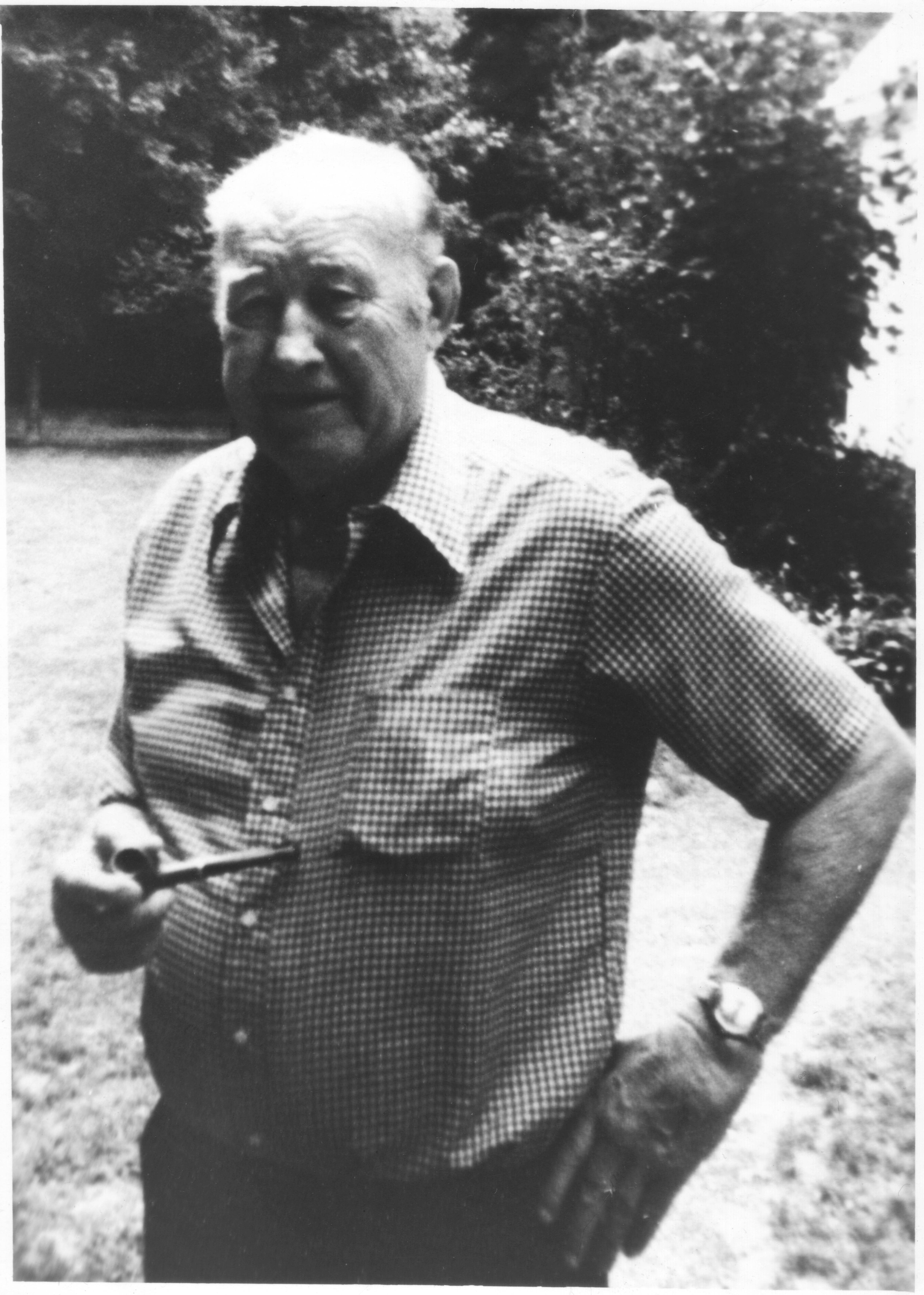
Juozas Žukauskas ("Jack Sharkey") when he was 78 years old.

Jack Sharkey (born Joseph Paul Zukauskas, Lithuanian: Juozas Povilas Žukauskas, October 26, 1902 – August 17, 1994) was a Lithuanian-American boxer who held the NYSAC, NBA, and The Ring heavyweight titles from 1932 to 1933.

== Boxing career ==
The son of Lithuanian immigrants, Sharkey was born in Binghamton, New York in 1902. He took his ring name from his two idols, heavyweight contender Tom Sharkey and heavyweight champion Jack Dempsey, to gain acceptance in the Irish-dominated boxing world of Boston. He won an important fight in 1926 over black heavyweight contender Harry Wills, but his first big year was 1927, when he defeated former light heavyweight champ Mike McTigue in twelve rounds and Boston rival Jim Maloney in five. That put him in the ring on July 21, 1927, with his idol Dempsey, the winner to meet heavyweight champion Gene Tunney for the title. For six rounds Sharkey engaged in fierce infighting with Dempsey who had a slight lead on the scorecards. In the seventh round, Sharkey turned his head to complain to the referee about an alleged low punch and Dempsey landed a classic left hook that knocked Sharkey out.

In 1928, Sharkey fought heavyweight contender Tom Heeney to a draw and defeated former light-heavyweight champion Jack Delaney. Early in 1929, he signed in a Tex Rickard promotion to fight Young Stribling in Miami. However, Sharkey and all involved suffered a scare when Rickard died unexpectedly. All preparations ceased as Rickard was laid to rest in New York. Unhappy with the uncertainty of it all, Jack complained to sportswriter Dan Parker, "That man isn't in his grave yet, and already they're trying to break my contract." In fact Bill Carey, president of Madison Square Garden saved the day by appointing Jack Dempsey himself to the task. Dempsey, a close personal friend of Rickard, had never handled a promotion before, but did so now with what might be called "large and largesse." Between leasing the Carl Fisher mansion on Miami Beach as well as the George Washington Hotel, the latter of which was equipped for the press with a 24-hour bar, the Sharkey-Stribling fight at the old Flamingo Park drew 40,000 fans, including 423 writers, and did $405,000 at the box office, an amount unsurpassed in the South until television receipts for Clay vs. Liston in 1964 managed a richer gate.

A fight held in Yankee Stadium later that year gave Sharkey the United States heavyweight title when he knocked out former light-heavyweight champion Tommy Loughran. This victory earned him the opportunity to fight for the vacant world title against the German contender Max Schmeling on June 12, 1930. Sharkey was disqualified in the fourth round after delivering a punch that landed below Schmeling's belt. This was the first time in boxing history that the heavyweight championship was won on a foul since Joe Goss in 1876.

In October 1931, Sharkey defeated Italian heavyweight, Primo Carnera and was then given another chance to fight for the title. On June 21, 1932, at the Madison Square Garden Bowl in Long Island City, New York, Sharkey defeated Schmeling in a controversial split decision to win the championship. Sharkey lost the title on June 29, 1933, in his second fight with Primo Carnera. This meant that Sharkey was the first heavyweight champion in history to both win and lose the championship against a European fighter. Floyd Patterson repeated this feat when regaining the title against Ingemar Johansson, having lost it to the Swede in their first fight. Oliver McCall then became the third such heavyweight champion when he beat Lennox Lewis for the WBC title in 1994 before losing it to Lewis's countryman Frank Bruno the following year. In recent years, with the proliferation of European-born world heavyweight champions, fighters such as Chris Byrd and Hasim Rahman have also won and lost their championships against European opposition. Sharkey's distinction is noteworthy, however, as Schmeling and Carnera were, respectively, only the second and third Europeans to win the world heavyweight championship.

Later in life, Sharkey would allege that his second fights with both Schmeling and Carnera were fixed. He took a year off, fought four mediocre fights, and then fought Joe Louis on August 18, 1936, losing by knockout in the third round. This made him the only man to fight both Dempsey and Louis.

Sharkey then retired with a record of 38-14-3 with 13 knockouts. As the Cyber Boxing Zone website describes him, "Sharkey had good skills, could hit with power, box well and take punishment when he set his mind to fight; But, he was an erratic, 'up-and-down' boxer who never seemed to put all his skills together consistently; when he was good, he was very good but when he was bad, he was awful."

== Notable bouts refereed ==
Ex-world heavyweight champion Jack Sharkey refereed Archie Moore's world light-heavyweight title defense against Yvon Durelle on December 10, 1958, at The Forum, in Montreal, Quebec, Canada, one of boxing's first championship televised bouts. Moore came off the canvas three times in the first round, and again in the fifth round, to knock out Durelle in the eleventh round. Sharkey also refereed the rematch at The Forum, in which Moore knocked down Durelle four times in the third round before knocking him out on August 12, 1959. Both bouts were broadcast worldwide in black and white from Canada, featuring commentary and post-fight interviews.

== Professional boxing record ==
All information in this section is derived from BoxRec, unless otherwise stated.

=== Official record ===
55 fights	37 wins	13 losses
By knockout	13	4
By decision	20	8
By disqualification	4	1
Draws	3	
Newspaper decisions/draws	2	

All newspaper decisions are officially regarded as “no decision” bouts and are not counted in the win/loss/draw column.

No.	Result	Record	Opponent	Type	Round	Date	Age	Location	Notes
55	Loss	37–13–3 (2)	Joe Louis	KO	3 (10)	Aug 18, 1936	33 years, 297 days	Yankee Stadium, New York City, New York, U.S.	
54	Win	37–12–3 (2)	Phil Brubaker	UD	10	Jun 25, 1936	33 years, 243 days	Fenway Park, Boston, Massachusetts, U.S.	
53	Draw	36–12–3 (2)	Tony Shucco	PTS	10	Apr 14, 1936	33 years, 171 days	Boston Garden, Boston, Massachusetts, U.S.	
52	Loss	36–12–2 (2)	Tony Shucco	UD	10	Feb 7, 1936	33 years, 104 days	Boston Garden, Boston, Massachusetts, U.S.	
51	Win	36–11–2 (2)	Unknown Winston	KO	2 (10)	Nov 22, 1935	33 years, 27 days	Boston Garden, Boston, Massachusetts, U.S.	
50	Loss	35–11–2 (2)	Tommy Loughran	SD	15	Sep 27, 1933	30 years, 336 days	Shibe Park, Philadelphia, Pennsylvania, U.S.	
49	Loss	35–10–2 (2)	King Levinsky	UD	10	Sep 18, 1933	30 years, 327 days	Comiskey Park, Chicago, Illinois, U.S.	
48	Loss	35–9–2 (2)	Primo Carnera	KO	6 (15)	Jun 29, 1933	30 years, 246 days	Madison Square Garden Bowl, Long Island City, New York City, New York, U.S.	Lost NYSAC, NBA, and The Ring heavyweight titles
47	Win	35–8–2 (2)	Max Schmeling	SD	15	Jun 21, 1932	29 years, 239 days	Madison Square Garden Bowl, Long Island City, New York City, New York, U.S.	Won NYSAC, NBA, and The Ring heavyweight titles
46	Win	34–8–2 (2)	Primo Carnera	UD	15	Oct 12, 1931	28 years, 351 days	Ebbets Field, New York City, New York, U.S.	Retained ABA heavyweight title
45	Draw	33–8–2 (2)	Mickey Walker	PTS	15	Jul 22, 1931	28 years, 269 days	Ebbets Field, New York City, New York, U.S.	
44	Loss	33–8–1 (2)	Max Schmeling	DQ	4 (15)	Jun 12, 1930	27 years, 229 days	Yankee Stadium, New York City, New York, U.S.	For vacant NYSAC, NBA, and The Ring heavyweight titles; Schmeling down from a low blow and unable to continue
43	Win	33–7–1 (2)	Phil Scott	TKO	3 (15)	Feb 27, 1930	27 years, 124 days	Madison Square Garden Stadium, Miami, Florida, U.S.	
42	Win	32–7–1 (2)	Tommy Loughran	TKO	3 (15)	Sep 26, 1929	26 years, 335 days	Yankee Stadium, New York City, New York, U.S.	Won vacant ABA heavyweight title
41	Win	31–7–1 (2)	Young Stribling	PTS	10	Feb 27, 1929	26 years, 124 days	Flamingo Park, Miami Beach, Florida, U.S.	
40	Win	30–7–1 (2)	Meyer Christner	MD	10	Jan 25, 1929	26 years, 91 days	Madison Square Garden, New York City, New York, U.S.	
39	Win	29–7–1 (2)	Arthur De Kuh	PTS	10	Dec 10, 1928	26 years, 45 days	Arena, Boston, Massachusetts, U.S.	
38	Win	28–7–1 (2)	Leo Gates	KO	3 (10)	Jun 21, 1928	25 years, 239 days	Battery A Arena, Saint Louis, Missouri, U.S.	
37	Win	27–7–1 (2)	Jack Delaney	KO	1 (15)	Apr 30, 1928	25 years, 187 days	Madison Square Garden, New York City, New York, U.S.	
36	Loss	26–7–1 (2)	Johnny Risko	SD	15	Mar 12, 1928	25 years, 138 days	Madison Square Garden, New York City, New York, U.S.	
35	Draw	26–6–1 (2)	Tom Heeney	SD	12	Jan 13, 1928	25 years, 79 days	Madison Square Garden, New York City, New York, U.S.	
34	Loss	26–6 (2)	Jack Dempsey	KO	7 (15)	Jul 21, 1927	24 years, 268 days	Yankee Stadium, New York City, New York, U.S.	
33	Win	26–5 (2)	Jim Maloney	TKO	5 (15)	May 20, 1927	24 years, 206 days	Yankee Stadium, New York City, New York, U.S.	
32	Win	25–5 (2)	Mike McTigue	TKO	12 (15)	Mar 3, 1927	24 years, 128 days	Madison Square Garden, New York City, New York, U.S.	
31	Win	24–5 (2)	Homer Smith	TKO	7 (10)	Dec 15, 1926	24 years, 50 days	Arena, Syracuse, New York, U.S.	
30	Win	23–5 (2)	Harry Wills	DQ	13 (15)	Oct 12, 1926	23 years, 351 days	Ebbets Field, New York City, New York, U.S.	Wills DQ'd for illegal use of a backhand blow
29	Win	22–5 (2)	George Godfrey	PTS	10	Sep 21, 1926	23 years, 330 days	Mechanics Building, Boston, Massachusetts, U.S.	
28	Win	21–5 (2)	Orlando Reverberi	TKO	3 (10)	Sep 13, 1926	23 years, 322 days	Laurel Garden, Newark, New Jersey, U.S.	
27	Win	20–5 (2)	Bud Gorman	DQ	1 (10)	Jun 25, 1926	23 years, 242 days	Braves Field, Boston, Massachusetts, U.S.	Gorman was DQ'd for a low blow
26	Win	19–5 (2)	Pat McCarthy	PTS	10	Apr 19, 1926	23 years, 175 days	Arena, Boston, Massachusetts, U.S.	
25	Win	18–5 (2)	Emilio Solomon	PTS	10	Apr 1, 1926	23 years, 157 days	Mechanics Building, Boston, Massachusetts, U.S.	
24	Win	17–5 (2)	Eddie Huffman	PTS	10	Feb 12, 1926	23 years, 109 days	Madison Square Garden, New York City, New York, U.S.	
23	Win	16–5 (2)	Mexican Joe Lawson	KO	2 (10)	Jan 18, 1926	23 years, 84 days	Foot Guard Hall, Hartford, Connecticut, U.S.	
22	Win	15–5 (2)	Jim Maloney	PTS	10	Dec 11, 1925	23 years, 46 days	Mechanics Building, Boston, Massachusetts, U.S.	Sharkey's corner claimed a foul when Maloney put him down in the 9th
21	Win	14–5 (2)	Johnny Risko	PTS	10	Sep 17, 1925	22 years, 326 days	Mechanics Building, Boston, Massachusetts, U.S.	
20	Loss	13–5 (2)	Bud Gorman	PTS	10	Aug 17, 1925	22 years, 295 days	Arena, Boston, Massachusetts, U.S.	
19	Win	13–4 (2)	Emilio Solomon	PTS	10	Jul 31, 1925	22 years, 278 days	Braves Field, Boston, Massachusetts, U.S.	
18	Win	12–4 (2)	Jim Maloney	DQ	9 (10)	Jun 5, 1925	22 years, 222 days	Braves Field, Boston, Massachusetts, U.S.	
17	Win	11–4 (2)	George Cook	SD	10	May 25, 1925	22 years, 211 days	Mechanics Building, Boston, Massachusetts, U.S.	
16	Win	10–4 (2)	Jack Renault	PTS	10	Apr 6, 1925	22 years, 162 days	Arena, Boston, Massachusetts, U.S.	
15	Loss	9–4 (2)	Charley Weinert	PTS	10	Feb 10, 1925	22 years, 107 days	Mechanics Building, Boston, Massachusetts, U.S.	
14	Win	9–3 (2)	Sully Montgomery	UD	10	Jan 20, 1925	22 years, 86 days	Mechanics Building, Boston, Massachusetts, U.S.	
13	Win	8–3 (2)	Jack DeMave	PTS	10	Jan 8, 1925	22 years, 74 days	Manhattan Casino, New York City, New York, U.S.	
12	Loss	7–3 (2)	Charley Weinert	NWS	12	Dec 15, 1924	22 years, 50 days	113th Regiment Armory, Newark, New Jersey, U.S.	
11	Loss	7–3 (1)	Jim Maloney	PTS	10	Nov 5, 1924	22 years, 10 days	Mechanics Building, Boston, Massachusetts, U.S.	
10	Loss	7–2 (1)	Quintin Romero Rojas	TKO	9 (10)	Aug 29, 1924	21 years, 308 days	Mechanics Building, Boston, Massachusetts, U.S.	
9	Win	7–1 (1)	Young Jack Johnson	NWS	6	Aug 20, 1924	21 years, 299 days	Fair Grounds Auditorium, Bangor, Maine, U.S.	
8	Win	7–1	Al Roberts	PTS	10	Jul 23, 1924	21 years, 271 days	Kinsley Park, Providence, Rhode Island, U.S.	
7	Win	6–1	Homer Smith	PTS	10	Jul 15, 1924	21 years, 263 days	Braves Field, Boston, Massachusetts, U.S.	
6	Win	5–1	Floyd Johnson	PTS	10	Jun 23, 1924	21 years, 241 days	Mechanics Building, Boston, Massachusetts, U.S.	
5	Win	4–1	Eddie Ricord	KO	7 (10)	Apr 25, 1924	21 years, 182 days	Arena, Boston, Massachusetts, U.S.	
4	Loss	3–1	Eddie Ricord	PTS	10	Mar 18, 1924	21 years, 144 days	Grand Opera House, Boston, Massachusetts, U.S.	
3	Win	3–0	Dan Lucas	KO	2 (8)	Feb 26, 1924	21 years, 123 days	Mechanics Building, Boston, Massachusetts, U.S.	
2	Win	2–0	Pat Hance	DQ	2 (10)	Feb 8, 1924	21 years, 105 days	Mechanics Building, Boston, Massachusetts, U.S.	Hance DQ'd for going down twice without being hit
1	Win	1–0	Billy Muldoon	TKO	1 (8)	Jan 29, 1924	21 years, 95 days	Mechanics Building, Boston, Massachusetts, U.S.	

=== Unofficial record ===
55 fights	38 wins	14 losses
By knockout	13	4
By decision	21	9
By disqualification	4	1
Draws	3	

Record with the inclusion of newspaper decisions in the win/loss/draw column.

No.	Result	Record	Opponent	Type	Round	Date	Age	Location	Notes
55	Loss	38–14–3	Joe Louis	KO	3 (10)	Aug 18, 1936	33 years, 297 days	Yankee Stadium, New York City, New York, U.S.	
54	Win	38–13–3	Phil Brubaker	UD	10	Jun 25, 1936	33 years, 243 days	Fenway Park, Boston, Massachusetts, U.S.	
53	Draw	37–13–3	Tony Shucco	PTS	10	Apr 14, 1936	33 years, 171 days	Boston Garden, Boston, Massachusetts, U.S.	
52	Loss	37–13–2	Tony Shucco	UD	10	Feb 7, 1936	33 years, 104 days	Boston Garden, Boston, Massachusetts, U.S.	
51	Win	37–12–2	Unknown Winston	KO	2 (10)	Nov 22, 1935	33 years, 27 days	Boston Garden, Boston, Massachusetts, U.S.	
50	Loss	36–12–2	Tommy Loughran	SD	15	Sep 27, 1933	30 years, 336 days	Shibe Park, Philadelphia, Pennsylvania, U.S.	
49	Loss	36–11–2	King Levinsky	UD	10	Sep 18, 1933	30 years, 327 days	Comiskey Park, Chicago, Illinois, U.S.	
48	Loss	36–10–2	Primo Carnera	KO	6 (15)	Jun 29, 1933	30 years, 246 days	Madison Square Garden Bowl, Long Island City, New York City, New York, U.S.	Lost NYSAC, NBA, and The Ring heavyweight titles
47	Win	36–9–2	Max Schmeling	SD	15	Jun 21, 1932	29 years, 239 days	Madison Square Garden Bowl, Long Island City, New York City, New York, U.S.	Won NYSAC, NBA, and The Ring heavyweight titles
46	Win	35–9–2	Primo Carnera	UD	15	Oct 12, 1931	28 years, 351 days	Ebbets Field, New York City, New York, U.S.	Retained ABA heavyweight title
45	Draw	34–9–2	Mickey Walker	PTS	15	Jul 22, 1931	28 years, 269 days	Ebbets Field, New York City, New York, U.S.	
44	Loss	34–9–1	Max Schmeling	DQ	4 (15)	Jun 12, 1930	27 years, 229 days	Yankee Stadium, New York City, New York, U.S.	For vacant NYSAC, NBA, and The Ring heavyweight titles; Schmeling down from a low blow and unable to continue
43	Win	34–8–1	Phil Scott	TKO	3 (15)	Feb 27, 1930	27 years, 124 days	Madison Square Garden Stadium, Miami, Florida, U.S.	
42	Win	33–8–1	Tommy Loughran	TKO	3 (15)	Sep 26, 1929	26 years, 335 days	Yankee Stadium, New York City, New York, U.S.	Won vacant ABA heavyweight title
41	Win	32–8–1	Young Stribling	PTS	10	Feb 27, 1929	26 years, 124 days	Flamingo Park, Miami Beach, Florida, U.S.	
40	Win	31–8–1	Meyer Christner	MD	10	Jan 25, 1929	26 years, 91 days	Madison Square Garden, New York City, New York, U.S.	
39	Win	30–8–1	Arthur De Kuh	PTS	10	Dec 10, 1928	26 years, 45 days	Arena, Boston, Massachusetts, U.S.	
38	Win	29–8–1	Leo Gates	KO	3 (10)	Jun 21, 1928	25 years, 239 days	Battery A Arena, Saint Louis, Missouri, U.S.	
37	Win	28–8–1	Jack Delaney	KO	1 (15)	Apr 30, 1928	25 years, 187 days	Madison Square Garden, New York City, New York, U.S.	
36	Loss	27–8–1	Johnny Risko	SD	15	Mar 12, 1928	25 years, 138 days	Madison Square Garden, New York City, New York, U.S.	
35	Draw	27–7–1	Tom Heeney	SD	12	Jan 13, 1928	25 years, 79 days	Madison Square Garden, New York City, New York, U.S.	
34	Loss	27–7	Jack Dempsey	KO	7 (15)	Jul 21, 1927	24 years, 268 days	Yankee Stadium, New York City, New York, U.S.	
33	Win	27–6	Jim Maloney	TKO	5 (15)	May 20, 1927	24 years, 206 days	Yankee Stadium, New York City, New York, U.S.	
32	Win	26–6	Mike McTigue	TKO	12 (15)	Mar 3, 1927	24 years, 128 days	Madison Square Garden, New York City, New York, U.S.	
31	Win	25–6	Homer Smith	TKO	7 (10)	Dec 15, 1926	24 years, 50 days	Arena, Syracuse, New York, U.S.	
30	Win	24–6	Harry Wills	DQ	13 (15)	Oct 12, 1926	23 years, 351 days	Ebbets Field, New York City, New York, U.S.	Wills DQ'd for illegal use of a backhand blow
29	Win	23–6	George Godfrey	PTS	10	Sep 21, 1926	23 years, 330 days	Mechanics Building, Boston, Massachusetts, U.S.	
28	Win	22–6	Orlando Reverberi	TKO	3 (10)	Sep 13, 1926	23 years, 322 days	Laurel Garden, Newark, New Jersey, U.S.	
27	Win	21–6	Bud Gorman	DQ	1 (10)	Jun 25, 1926	23 years, 242 days	Braves Field, Boston, Massachusetts, U.S.	Gorman was DQ'd for a low blow
26	Win	20–6	Pat McCarthy	PTS	10	Apr 19, 1926	23 years, 175 days	Arena, Boston, Massachusetts, U.S.	
25	Win	19–6	Emilio Solomon	PTS	10	Apr 1, 1926	23 years, 157 days	Mechanics Building, Boston, Massachusetts, U.S.	
24	Win	18–6	Eddie Huffman	PTS	10	Feb 12, 1926	23 years, 109 days	Madison Square Garden, New York City, New York, U.S.	
23	Win	17–6	Mexican Joe Lawson	KO	2 (10)	Jan 18, 1926	23 years, 84 days	Foot Guard Hall, Hartford, Connecticut, U.S.	
22	Win	16–6	Jim Maloney	PTS	10	Dec 11, 1925	23 years, 46 days	Mechanics Building, Boston, Massachusetts, U.S.	Sharkey's corner claimed a foul when Maloney put him down in the 9th
21	Win	15–6	Johnny Risko	PTS	10	Sep 17, 1925	22 years, 326 days	Mechanics Building, Boston, Massachusetts, U.S.	
20	Loss	14–6	Bud Gorman	PTS	10	Aug 17, 1925	22 years, 295 days	Arena, Boston, Massachusetts, U.S.	
19	Win	14–5	Emilio Solomon	PTS	10	Jul 31, 1925	22 years, 278 days	Braves Field, Boston, Massachusetts, U.S.	
18	Win	13–5	Jim Maloney	DQ	9 (10)	Jun 5, 1925	22 years, 222 days	Braves Field, Boston, Massachusetts, U.S.	
17	Win	12–5	George Cook	SD	10	May 25, 1925	22 years, 211 days	Mechanics Building, Boston, Massachusetts, U.S.	
16	Win	11–5	Jack Renault	PTS	10	Apr 6, 1925	22 years, 162 days	Arena, Boston, Massachusetts, U.S.	
15	Loss	10–5	Charley Weinert	PTS	10	Feb 10, 1925	22 years, 107 days	Mechanics Building, Boston, Massachusetts, U.S.	
14	Win	10–4	Sully Montgomery	UD	10	Jan 20, 1925	22 years, 86 days	Mechanics Building, Boston, Massachusetts, U.S.	
13	Win	9–4	Jack DeMave	PTS	10	Jan 8, 1925	22 years, 74 days	Manhattan Casino, New York City, New York, U.S.	
12	Loss	8–4	Charley Weinert	NWS	12	Dec 15, 1924	22 years, 50 days	113th Regiment Armory, Newark, New Jersey, U.S.	
11	Loss	8–3	Jim Maloney	PTS	10	Nov 5, 1924	22 years, 10 days	Mechanics Building, Boston, Massachusetts, U.S.	
10	Loss	8–2	Quintin Romero Rojas	TKO	9 (10)	Aug 29, 1924	21 years, 308 days	Mechanics Building, Boston, Massachusetts, U.S.	
9	Win	8–1	Young Jack Johnson	NWS	6	Aug 20, 1924	21 years, 299 days	Fair Grounds Auditorium, Bangor, Maine, U.S.	
8	Win	7–1	Al Roberts	PTS	10	Jul 23, 1924	21 years, 271 days	Kinsley Park, Providence, Rhode Island, U.S.	
7	Win	6–1	Homer Smith	PTS	10	Jul 15, 1924	21 years, 263 days	Braves Field, Boston, Massachusetts, U.S.	
6	Win	5–1	Floyd Johnson	PTS	10	Jun 23, 1924	21 years, 241 days	Mechanics Building, Boston, Massachusetts, U.S.	
5	Win	4–1	Eddie Ricord	KO	7 (10)	Apr 25, 1924	21 years, 182 days	Arena, Boston, Massachusetts, U.S.	
4	Loss	3–1	Eddie Ricord	PTS	10	Mar 18, 1924	21 years, 144 days	Grand Opera House, Boston, Massachusetts, U.S.	
3	Win	3–0	Dan Lucas	KO	2 (8)	Feb 26, 1924	21 years, 123 days	Mechanics Building, Boston, Massachusetts, U.S.	
2	Win	2–0	Pat Hance	DQ	2 (10)	Feb 8, 1924	21 years, 105 days	Mechanics Building, Boston, Massachusetts, U.S.	Hance DQ'd for going down twice without being hit
1	Win	1–0	Billy Muldoon	TKO	1 (8)	Jan 29, 1924	21 years, 95 days	Mechanics Building, Boston, Massachusetts, U.S.	

== Titles in boxing ==
=== Major world titles ===
- NYSAC heavyweight champion (200+ lbs)
- NBA (WBA) heavyweight champion (200+ lbs)

=== The Ring magazine titles ===
- The Ring heavyweight champion (200+ lbs)

=== Regional/International titles ===
- American (ABA) heavyweight champion (200+ lbs)

=== Undisputed titles ===
- Undisputed heavyweight champion

== See also ==
- List of heavyweight boxing champions

Sporting positions
World boxing titles
Preceded by Max Schmeling	NYSAC heavyweight champion June 21, 1932 – June 29, 1933	Succeeded by Primo Carnera
Preceded by Max Schmeling	NBA heavyweight champion June 21, 1932 – June 29, 1933	Succeeded by Primo Carnera
Preceded by Max Schmeling	The Ring heavyweight champion June 21, 1932 – June 29, 1933	Succeeded by Primo Carnera
Preceded by Max Schmeling	Undisputed heavyweight champion June 21, 1932 – June 29, 1933	Succeeded by Primo Carnera
Records
Preceded by Jack Dempsey	Oldest living heavyweight champion May 31, 1983 – August 17, 1994	Succeeded by Max Schmeling
Preceded by Johnny Wilson	Oldest living world champion December 8, 1985 – August 17, 1994	Succeeded by Max Schmeling
