= Max Baer =

Max Baer may refer to:

- Max Baer (boxer) (1909–1959), American boxing world champion
- Max Baer Jr. (born 1937), son of the boxer, American actor on TV's The Beverly Hillbillies
- Max Baer (judge) (1947–2022), American jurist, Pennsylvania Supreme Court Justice
