= Monument to Joe Louis =

Memorial in Detroit, USA

- The Fist
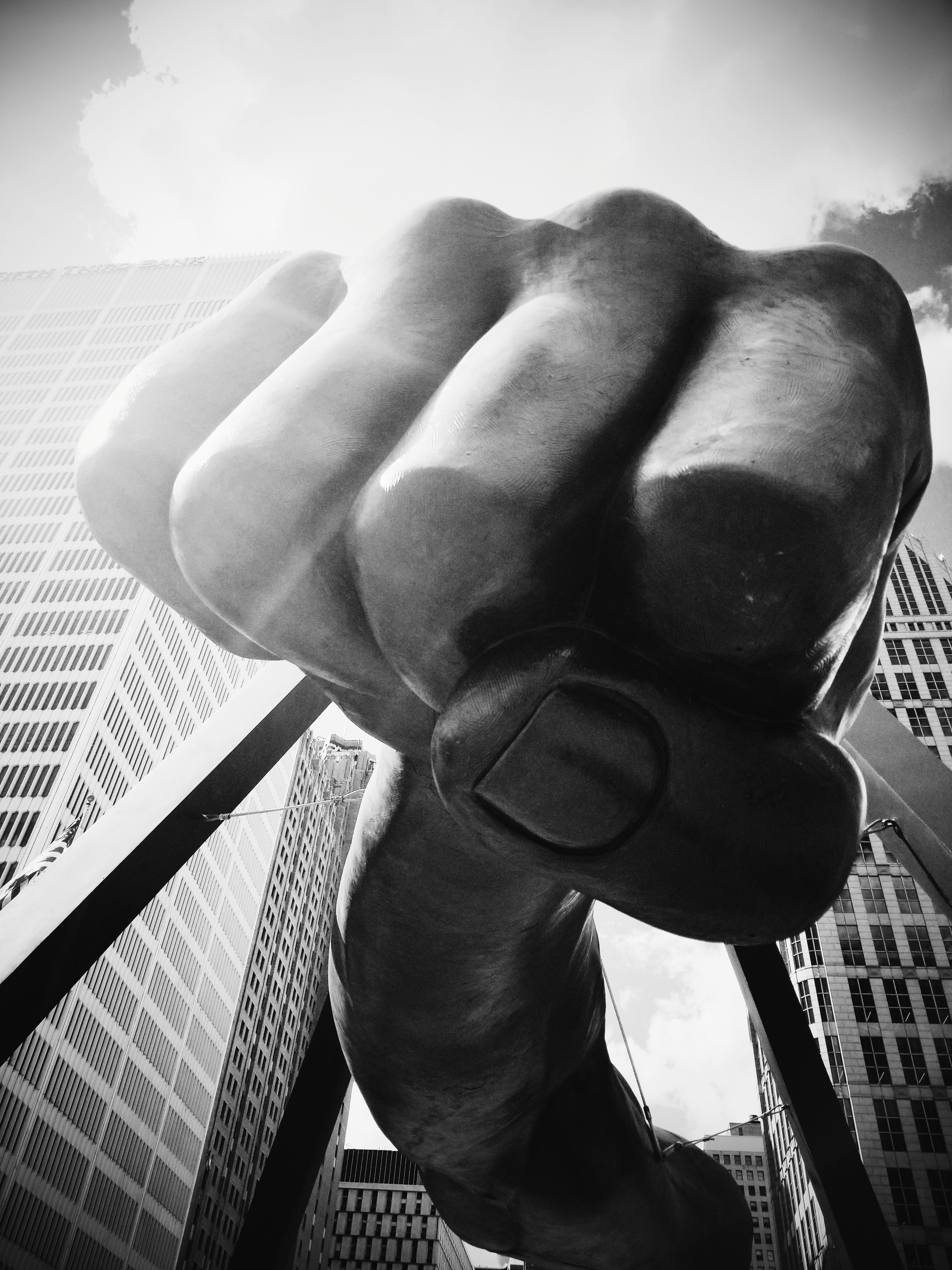
- The sculpture in 2019
- Artist: Robert Graham (sculptor)
- Year: 1986
- Completion date: 1986
- Type: Sculpture
- Medium: Bronze
- Dimensions: 7.3 m × 3.5 m × 7.3 m (24 ft × 11.5 ft × 24 ft)
- Weight: 5000 lbs. fist alone; 8000 lbs. total including framework
- Location: Detroit, Michigan, United States; 42°19′43″N 83°02′40″W
- Owner: Detroit Institute of Arts
- Website: https://www.dia.org/art/collection/object/monument-joe-louis-46291

The Monument to Joe Louis, known also as The Fist, is a memorial dedicated to boxer Joe Louis located at the intersection of Jefferson Avenue and Woodward Avenue in Detroit, near Hart Plaza. The sculpture is one of three monuments in Detroit honoring Joe Louis.

== History ==
Showing title of piece

Dedicated on October 16, 1986, the sculpture, commissioned by Sports Illustrated from the Mexican-American sculptor Robert Graham (1938–2008), and poured by the legendary bronze artist, Rolf Kriken, is a 24-foot-long (7.3 m) arm with a fisted hand suspended by a 24-foot-high (7.3 m) pyramidal framework. The sculpture weighs 5000 pounds and the total weight including the framework is 8000 pounds.

The inscription on the back of the arm reads:

MONUMENT
TO
JOE LOUIS
BY
ROBERT GRAHAM

A GIFT FROM SPORTS ILLUSTRATED
TO THE PEOPLE OF THE CITY OF
DETROIT. THE DETROIT INSTITUTE OF
ARTS AND ITS FOUNDERS SOCIETY
ON THE OCCASION OF THE MUSEUM'S
CENTENNIAL. 1885-1985.

It represents the power of his punch both inside and outside the ring. Because of Louis' efforts to fight Jim Crow laws, the fist was symbolically intended as a statement against racism. Graham referred to the sculpture as a "battering ram". It is claimed to be an historical metaphor, even down to its placement (pointing toward Canada).

The sculpture was vandalized by two white men in 2004, who covered it in white paint and left a sign which read, "Courtesy of Fighting Whities". Graham responded that the piece was "working" if it aroused passion.

The sculpture is one of three monuments in Detroit honoring Joe Louis. There is also a full-size statue of Louis located inside the Huntington Place convention center and one in the Joe Louis Greenway.

== In popular culture ==
- The monument is featured briefly in the 1998 film, Out of Sight.
- In 2013, Detroit-based artist Jerry Vile placed a 4-ft. tall can of Crisco in front of the monument with a statement indicating it was for "helping to ease the pain of Detroit's bankruptcy." Many interpreted the can as a reference to fisting, a sex act in which Crisco is sometimes used as lubricant.
- The statue is featured prominently in the opening sequences of the 2018 video game, Detroit: Become Human.
