= Stephanie and Spy =

- Artist: Robert Graham
- Year: 1980–81
- Type: Cast bronze sculpture
- Dimensions: 181.0 cm × 33.7 cm × 140 cm (71.25 in × 13.25 in × 55 in)
- Location: Los Angeles; 34°4′26.21″N 118°26′31.45″W
- Owner: Hammer Museum

Stephanie and Spy is a sculpture by American artist Robert Graham located in the Rolfe Hall Courtyard on the campus of the University of California, Los Angeles, in Los Angeles, California, United States. The two-part, bronze sculpture was made in 1980-81 and depicts a nude woman standing next to a horse. Each figure stands on its own pedestal positioned about 2 feet from each other.

== Description ==
The sculpture is made in cast bronze and depicts two figures: one is Stephanie, a nude female, and the other is Spy, a horse. Each figure stands on its own pedestal and the pedestals are placed next to each other so the figures stand side by side, about two feet apart. Spy stands to the proper right of Stephanie. Both figures are looking forward. Spy's feet stand straight and parallel to each other, except for the proper left hoof which is placed slightly back from the plane of the proper right foot. Stephanie stands straight with her arms at her sides slightly lifted away from her hips. The front of each of the pedestals are aligned despite the difference in the length of the sculpture and pedestal between the two figures.

The sculpture measurements are as follows: Stephanie (female) 61 1/2 × 7 1/2 × 11 1/2 in. (156.2 × 19.1 × 29.2 cm) and Spy (horse) 71 1/4 × 13 3/4 × 55 in. (181 × 34.9 × 139.7 cm).

=== Acquisition ===
The sculpture was gifted to UCLA by alumni Carol and Roy Doumani.

It is installed towards the center of the Rolfe Hall Courtyard on the UCLA campus, surrounded by 10 other works by Robert Graham:

- Fountain Figure I, 1983
- Fountain Figure III, 1983
- Lori, 1986
- Olympic Torso (Female), 1983
- Olympic Torso (Male), 1983
- Sasha, 1993
- Study for Column I, (Neith), 1988
- Study for Column II, (Lisa Ann), 1988
- Study for Column III, (Debbie), 1988
- Untitled (Lise), 1977

== See also ==
- Robert Graham
- Cathedral of Our Lady of the Angels
