= Joe Louis =

American boxer (1914–1981)

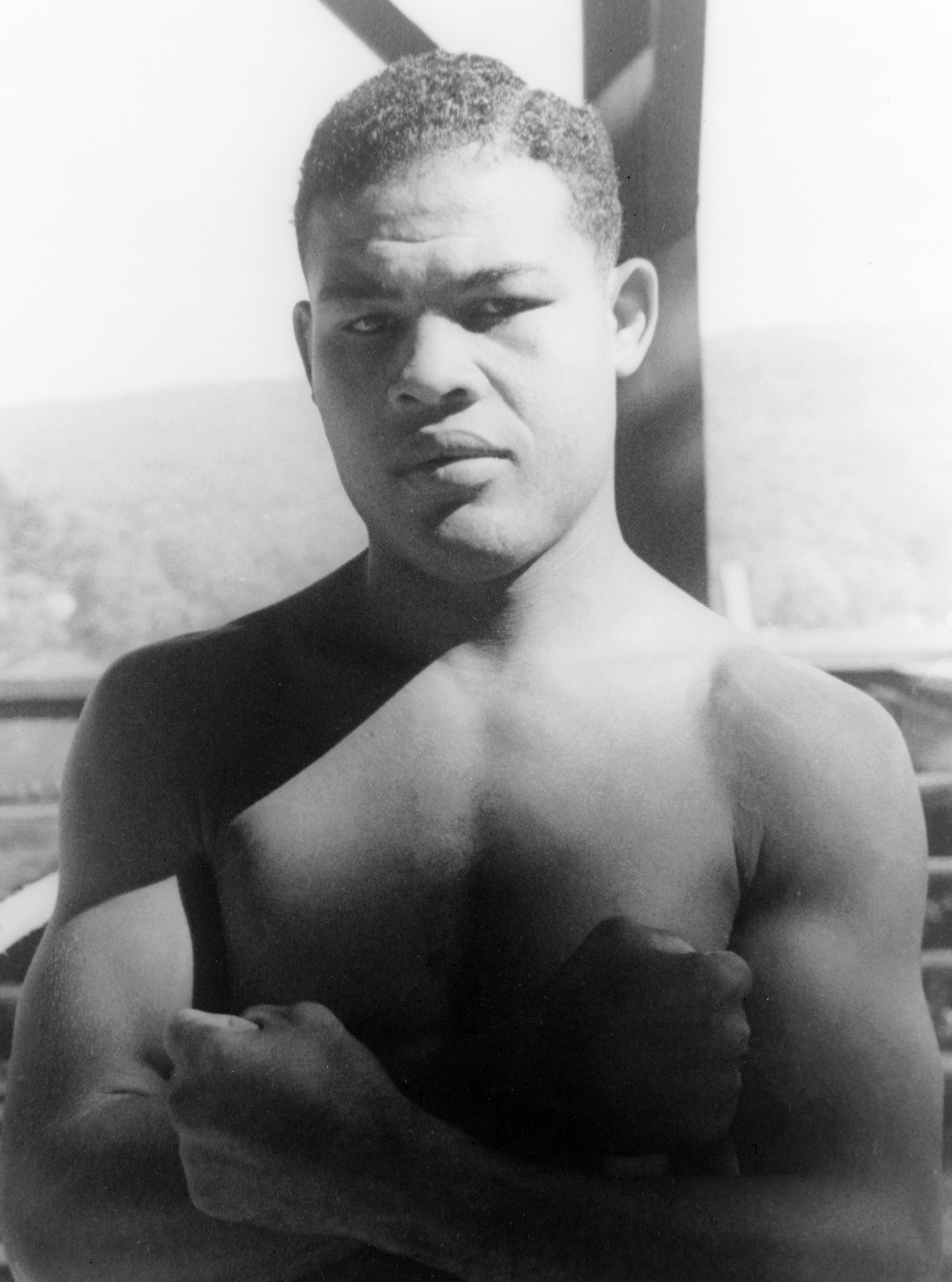
- Louis in 1941

Personal information
- Nickname: "The Brown Bomber"
- Born: Joseph Louis Barrow; May 13, 1914 LaFayette, Alabama, U.S.
- Died: April 12, 1981 (aged 66) Paradise, Nevada, U.S.
- Height: 6 ft 1 1/2 in (1.87 m)
- Weight: Heavyweight

Boxing career
- Reach: 76 in (193 cm)
- Stance: Orthodox

Boxing record
- Total fights: 69
- Wins: 66
- Win by KO: 52
- Losses: 3
Medal record
Men's amateur boxing
Golden Gloves
Gold medal – first place	1934 Chicago	Light-heavyweight
Chicago Golden Gloves
Gold medal – first place	1934 Chicago	Light-heavyweight
US National Championships
Gold medal – first place	1934 St.Louis	Light-heavyweight

Joseph Louis Barrow (May 13, 1914 – April 12, 1981) was an American professional boxer who competed from 1934 to 1951. Nicknamed "the Brown Bomber", Louis is widely regarded as one of the greatest and most influential boxers of all time. He reigned as the world heavyweight champion from 1937 until his temporary retirement in 1949. He was victorious in 25 consecutive title defenses, a record for all weight classes. (Note: According to BoxRec and IBHOF, Louis's fight against Johnny Davis in 1944, viewed by many as an exhibition fight, was for the NYSAC heavyweight title, which would lift Louis's title defenses to 26, overall title fight wins to 27, beaten opponents in title fights to 22, and title fights to 28.) Louis has the longest single reign as champion of any boxer in history.

Louis's cultural impact was felt well outside the ring. He is widely regarded as the first Black American to achieve the status of a nationwide hero within the United States, and was also a focal point of anti-Nazi sentiment leading up to and during World War II because of his historic rematch with German boxer Max Schmeling in 1938.

== Early life ==
Born on May 13, 1914, in rural Chambers County, Alabama—in a ramshackle dwelling on Bell Chapel Road, located about 1 mile (2 kilometres) off State Route 50 and roughly 6 miles (10 kilometres) from LaFayette—Louis was the seventh of eight children of Munroe Barrow and Lillie (Reese) Barrow. He weighed 11 pounds (5 kg) at birth. Both of his parents were children of former slaves, alternating between sharecropping and rental farming.

Louis suffered from a speech impediment and spoke very little until about the age of six. Munroe Barrow was committed to a mental institution in 1916 and, as a result, Joe knew very little of his biological father. Around 1920, Louis' mother married Pat Brooks, a local construction contractor, having received word that Munroe Barrow had died while institutionalized (in reality, Munroe Barrow lived until 1938, unaware of his son's fame).

In 1926, shaken by a gang of white men in the Ku Klux Klan, Louis's family moved to Detroit, Michigan, forming part of the post–World War I Great Migration. Joe's brother worked for Ford Motor Company (where Joe would himself work for a time at the River Rouge Plant) and the family settled into a home at 2700 Catherine (now Madison) Street in Detroit's Black Bottom neighborhood.

Louis attended Bronson Vocational School for a time to learn cabinetmaking.

== Amateur career ==
The Great Depression severely affected the Barrow family, but Joe still made time to work out at a local youth recreation center at 637 Brewster Street in Detroit. His mother attempted to get him interested in playing the violin. He is rumored to have tried to hide his pugilistic ambitions from his mother by carrying his boxing gloves inside his violin case.

Louis made his debut in early 1932 at the age of 17. Legend has it that before the fight, the barely literate Louis wrote his name so large that there was no room for his last name, and thus became known as "Joe Louis" for the remainder of his boxing career (more likely, Louis simply omitted his last name to keep his boxing a secret from his mother). After this debut—a loss to future Olympian Johnny Miler—Louis compiled numerous amateur victories, eventually winning the club championship of his Brewster Street recreation center, the home of many aspiring Golden Gloves fighters.

In 1933, Louis won the Detroit-area Golden Gloves Novice Division championship against Joe Biskey for the light heavyweight classification. He later lost in the Chicago Golden Gloves Tournament of Champions. The next year, competing in the Golden Gloves' Open Division, he won the light heavyweight classification, this time also winning the Chicago Tournament of Champions against Joe Bauer. However, a hand injury forced Louis to miss the New York/Chicago Champions' cross-town bout for the ultimate Golden Gloves championship. In April 1934, he followed up his Chicago performance by winning the light heavyweight United States Amateur Champion National AAU tournament in St. Louis, Missouri.

By the end of his amateur career, Louis's record was 50–4, with 43 knockouts. (Note: BoxRec lists Louis's amateur record as 53 wins in 56 bouts; various sources disagree as to his amateur record.)

== Professional career ==
Joe Louis had only three losses in his 69 professional fights. He tallied 52 knockouts and held the championship from 1937 to 1949, the longest span of any heavyweight titleholder. After returning from retirement, Louis failed to regain the championship in 1950, and his career ended after he was knocked out by Rocky Marciano in 1951.

=== Early years ===
Louis's amateur performances attracted the interest of professional promoters, and he was soon represented by a Black Detroit-area bookmaker named John Roxborough. As Louis explained in his autobiography, Roxborough convinced the young fighter that white managers would have no real interest in seeing a Black boxer work his way up to title contention:

[Roxborough] told me about the fate of most black fighters, ones with white managers, who wound up burned-out and broke before they reached their prime. The white managers were not interested in the men they were handling but in the money they could make from them. They didn't take the proper time to see that their fighters had a proper training, that they lived comfortably, or ate well, or had some pocket change. Mr. Roxborough was talking about Black Power before it became popular.

Roxborough knew a Chicago area boxing promoter named Julian Black who already had a stable of mediocre boxers against which Louis could hone his craft, this time in the heavyweight division. After becoming part of the management team, Black hired fellow Chicago native Jack "Chappy" Blackburn as Louis's trainer. Louis's initial professional fights were all in the Chicago area, his professional debut coming on July 4, 1934, against Jack Kracken in the Bacon Casino on Chicago's south side. Louis earned $59 for knocking out Kracken in the first round. $59 in 1934 is equivalent to $1,148.60 in 2020 dollars. Louis won all 12 of his professional fights that year, 10 by knockout.

In September 1934, while promoting a Detroit-area "coming home" bout for Louis against Canadian Alex Borchuk, Roxborough was pressured by members of the Michigan State Boxing Commission to have Louis sign with white management. Roxborough refused and continued advancing Louis's career with bouts against heavyweight contenders Art Sykes and Stanley Poreda.

While training for a fight against Lee Ramage, Louis noticed a young female secretary for the Black newspaper at the gym. After Ramage was defeated, the secretary, Marva Trotter, was invited to the celebration party at Chicago's Grand Hotel. Trotter later became Louis's first wife in 1935.

During this time, Louis also met Truman Gibson, the man who would become his personal lawyer. As a young associate at a law firm hired by Julian Black, Gibson was charged with personally entertaining Louis during the pendency of business deals.

==== Title contention ====
Although Louis's management was finding him bouts against legitimate heavyweight contenders, no path to the title was forthcoming. While professional boxing was not officially segregated, many white Americans did not like the prospect of a black champion. In 1908, during an era of severe anti-Black repression, Jack Johnson became the first Black heavyweight champion. Johnson's flamboyant lifestyle and marriage to a white woman engendered an enormous backlash that greatly limited opportunities of Black fighters in the heavyweight division. Black boxers were denied championship bouts, and there were few heavyweight black contenders at the time, though there were Black Americans who fought for titles in other weight divisions, and a few notable black champions, such as Tiger Flowers. Louis and his handlers would counter the legacy of Johnson by emphasizing the Brown Bomber's modesty and sportsmanship. Biographer Gerald Astor stated that "Joe Louis' early boxing career was stalked by the specter of Jack Johnson".

If Louis were to rise to national prominence among such cultural attitudes, a change in management would be necessary. In 1935, boxing promoter Mike Jacobs sought out Louis's handlers. After Louis's narrow defeat of Natie Brown on March 29, 1935, Jacobs and the Louis team met at the Frog Club, a Black nightclub, and negotiated a three-year exclusive boxing promotion deal. The contract, however, did not keep Roxborough and Black from attempting to cash in as Louis's managers; when Louis turned 21 on May 13, 1935, Roxborough and Black each signed Louis to an onerous long-term contract that collectively dedicated half of Louis's future income to the pair.

Black and Roxborough continued to carefully and deliberately shape Louis's media image. Mindful of the tremendous public backlash Johnson had suffered for his unapologetic attitude and flamboyant lifestyle, they drafted "Seven Commandments" for Louis's personal conduct. These included:

- Never have his picture taken with a white woman
- Never gloat over a fallen opponent
- Never engage in fixed fights
- Live and fight clean

As a result, Louis was generally portrayed in the white media as a modest, clean-living person, which facilitated his burgeoning celebrity status.

With the backing of a major promotion, Louis fought thirteen times in 1935. The bout that helped put him in the media spotlight occurred on June 25, when Louis knocked out 6'6", 265-pound former world heavyweight champion Primo Carnera in six rounds. Foreshadowing the Louis–Schmeling rivalry to come, the Carnera bout featured a political dimension. Louis's victory over Carnera, who symbolized Benito Mussolini's regime in the popular eye, was seen as a victory for the international community, particularly among Black Americans, who were sympathetic to Ethiopia, which was attempting to maintain its independence by fending off an invasion by fascist Italy. America's white press began promoting Louis's image in the context of the era's racism; nicknames they created included the "Mahogany Mauler", "Chocolate Chopper", "Coffee-Colored KO King", "Safari Sandman", and one that stuck: "The Brown Bomber".

Helping the white press to overcome its reluctance to feature a Black American contender was that in the mid-1930s boxing desperately needed a marketable hero. Since the retirement of Jack Dempsey in 1929, the sport had devolved into a sordid mixture of poor athletes, gambling, fixed fights, thrown matches, and control of the sport by organized crime. New York Times Columnist Edward Van Ness wrote, "Louis ... is a boon to boxing. Just as Dempsey led the sport out of the doldrums ... so is Louis leading the boxing game out of a slump". Likewise, biographer Bill Libby asserted that "The sports world was hungry for a great champion when Louis arrived in New York in 1935".

While the mainstream press was beginning to embrace Louis, many still opposed the prospect of another black heavyweight champion. In September 1935, on the eve of Louis's fight with former titleholder Max Baer, Washington Post sportswriter Shirley Povich wrote about some Americans' hopes for the white contender, "They say Baer will surpass himself in the knowledge that he is the lone white hope for the defense of Nordic superiority in the prize ring". Those expectations were soon disproven.

Although Baer had been knocked down only once before in his professional career (by Frankie Campbell), Louis dominated the former champion, knocking him out in the fourth round. Unknowingly, Baer suffered from a unique disadvantage in the fight: earlier that evening, Louis had married Marva Trotter at a friend's apartment and was eager to end the fight in order to consummate the relationship. Later that year, Louis also knocked out Paulino Uzcudun, who had never been knocked down before.

==== Louis vs. Schmeling ====
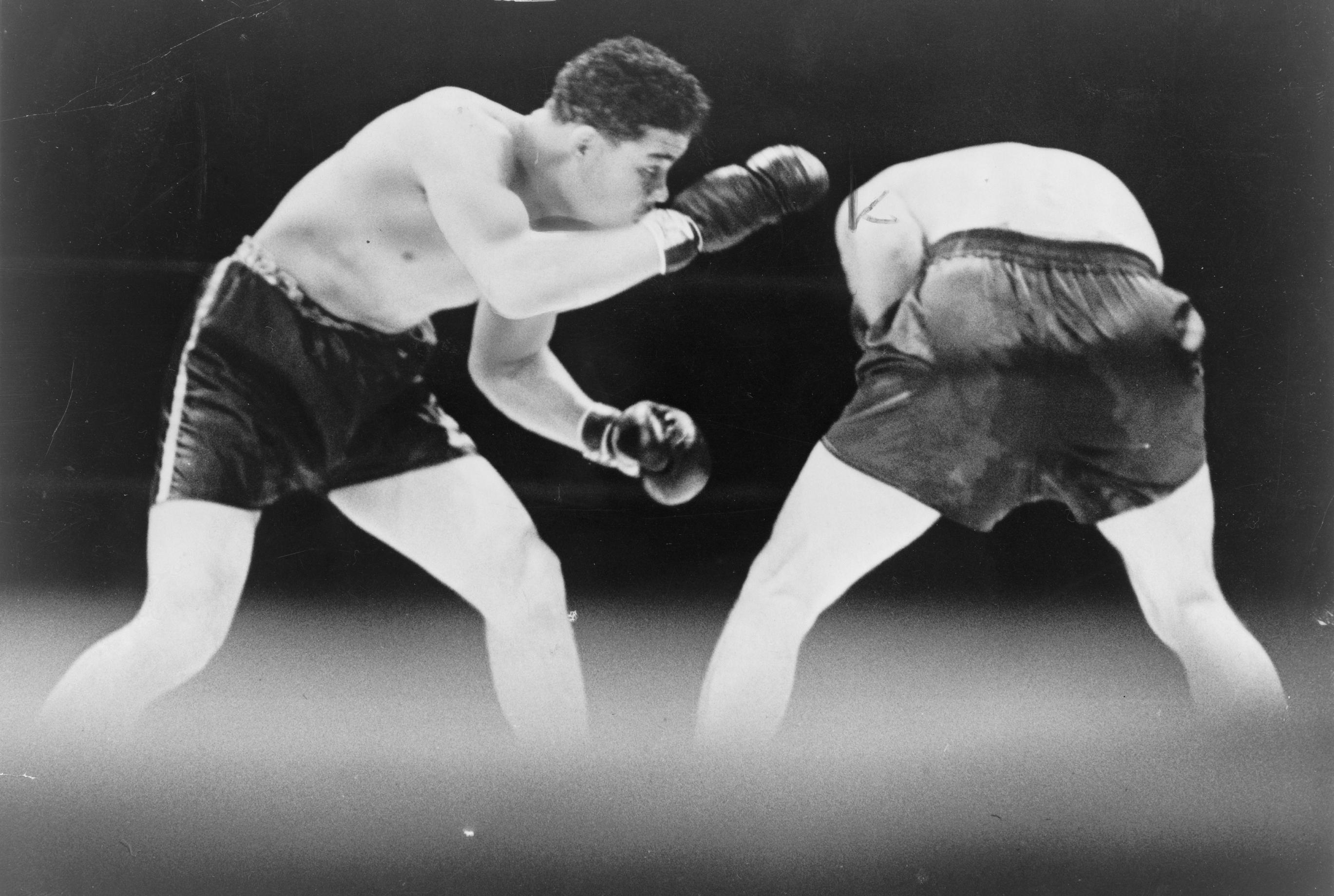
Joe Louis vs. Max Schmeling in 1936

By this time, Louis was ranked as the No. 1 contender in the heavyweight division and had won the Associated Press' "Athlete of the Year" award for 1935. What was considered to be a final tune-up bout before an eventual title shot was scheduled for June 1936 against Max Schmeling. Although a former world heavyweight champion, Schmeling, who had been knocked out by Max Baer - himself handily beaten by Louis the year prior - was not considered a threat to Louis, then with a professional record of 27–0. Schmeling had won his title on a technicality when Jack Sharkey was disqualified after giving Schmeling a low blow in 1930. Schmeling was also 30 years old at the time of the Louis bout and allegedly past his prime. Louis's training retreat was located at Lakewood, New Jersey, where he was first able to practice the game of golf, later to become a lifelong passion. Noted entertainer Ed Sullivan had initially sparked Louis's interest in the sport by giving an instructional book to Joe's wife Marva. Louis spent significant time on the golf course rather than training for the match.

Conversely, Schmeling prepared intently for the bout. He had thoroughly studied Louis's style and believed he had found a weakness. By exploiting Louis's habit of dropping his left hand after a jab, Schmeling handed Louis his first professional loss by knocking him out in round 12 at Yankee Stadium on June 19, 1936. The event would lead to the historic rematch of the two, in one of the world's most famous sporting events.

=== World championship ===
After defeating Louis, Schmeling expected a title shot against James J. Braddock, who had unexpectedly defeated Max Baer for the heavyweight title the previous June. Madison Square Garden (MSG) had a contract with Braddock for the title defense and also sought a Braddock–Schmeling title bout. But Jacobs and Braddock's manager Joe Gould had been planning a Braddock–Louis matchup for months.

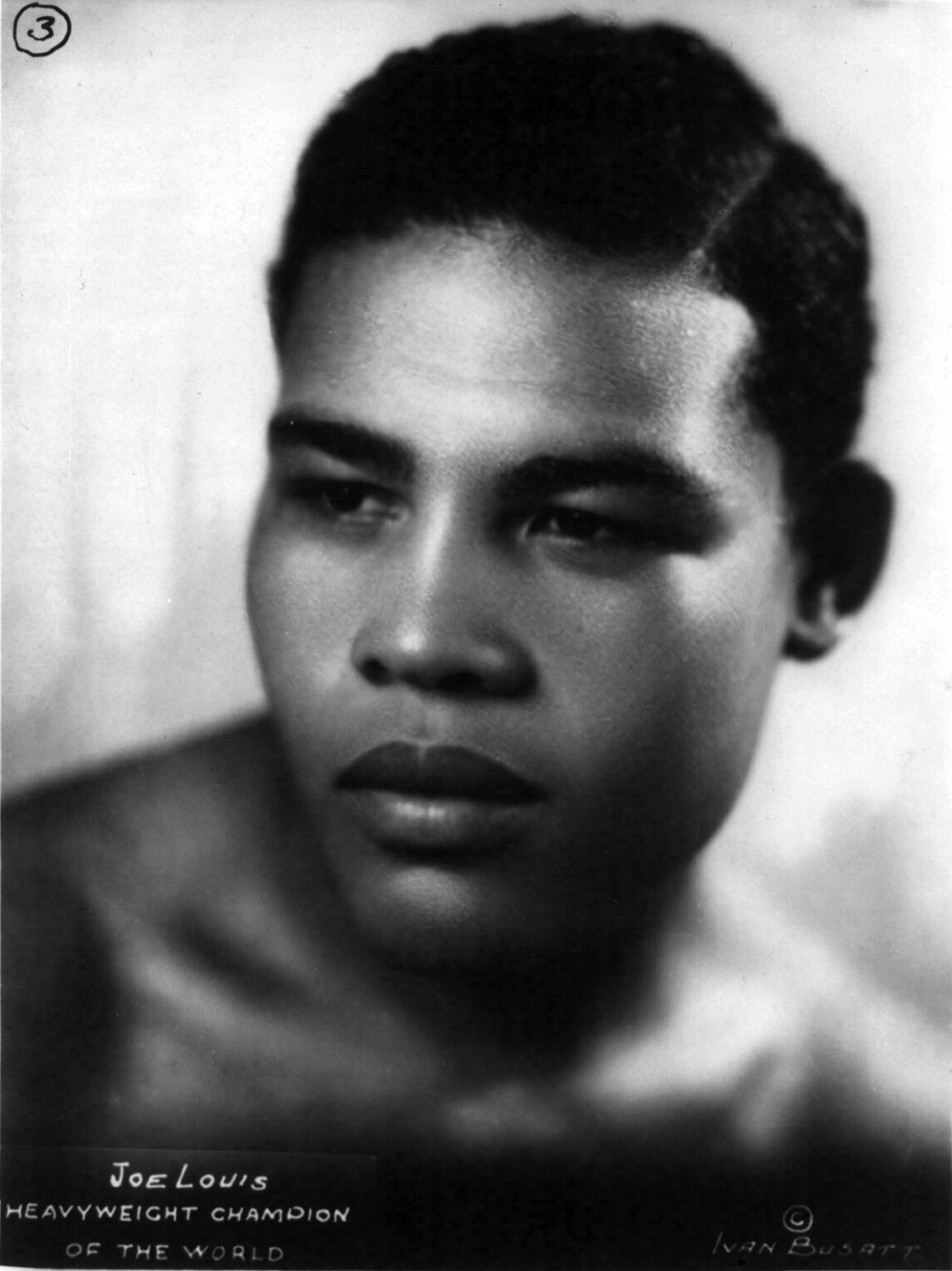
Louis in 1937

Schmeling's victory gave Gould tremendous leverage, however. If he were to offer Schmeling the title chance instead of Louis, there was a very real possibility that Nazi authorities would never allow Louis a shot at the title. Gould's demands were therefore onerous: Jacobs would have to pay 10% of all future boxing promotion profits (including any future profits from Louis's future bouts) for ten years. Braddock and Gould would eventually receive more than $150,000 from this arrangement. Well before the actual fight, Jacobs and Gould publicly announced that their fighters would fight for the heavyweight title on June 22, 1937. Figuring that the New York State Athletic Commission would not sanction the fight in deference to MSG and Schmeling, Jacobs scheduled the fight for Chicago.

Each of the parties involved worked to facilitate the controversial Braddock–Louis matchup. Louis did his part by knocking out former champion Jack Sharkey on August 18, 1936. Meanwhile, Gould trumped up anti-Nazi sentiment against Schmeling, and Jacobs defended a lawsuit by MSG to halt the Braddock–Louis fight. A federal court in Newark, New Jersey, eventually ruled that Braddock's contractual obligation to stage his title defense at MSG was unenforceable for lack of mutual consideration.

The stage was set for Louis's title shot. On the night of the fight, June 22, 1937, Braddock was able to knock Louis down in round one, but afterward could accomplish little. After inflicting constant punishment, Louis defeated Braddock in round eight, knocking him out cold with a strong right hand that busted James' teeth through his gum shield and lip and sent him to the ground for a few minutes. It was the first and only time that Braddock was knocked out (the one other stoppage of Braddock's career was a TKO due to a cut). Louis's ascent to the world heavyweight championship was complete.

Louis's victory was a seminal moment in Black American history. Thousands of Black people stayed up all night across the country in celebration. Noted author and member of the Harlem Renaissance Langston Hughes described Louis's effect in these terms:

Each time Joe Louis won a fight in those depression years, even before he became champion, thousands of black Americans on relief or W.P.A., and poor, would throng out into the streets all across the land to march and cheer and yell and cry because of Joe's one-man triumphs. No one else in the United States has ever had such an effect on Negro emotions—or on mine. I marched and cheered and yelled and cried, too.

==== Initial title defenses ====
Despite his championship, Louis was haunted by the earlier defeat to Schmeling. Shortly after winning the title, he was quoted as saying, "I don't want to be called champ until I whip Max Schmeling". Louis's manager Mike Jacobs attempted to arrange a rematch in 1937, but negotiations broke down when Schmeling demanded 30% of the gate. When Schmeling instead attempted to arrange for a fight against British Empire champion Tommy Farr, known as the "Tonypandy Terror"—ostensibly for a world championship to rival the claims of American boxing authorities—Jacobs outmaneuvered him, offering Farr a guaranteed $60,000 to fight Louis instead. The offer was too lucrative for Farr to turn down.

On August 30, 1937, after a postponement of four days due to rain, Louis and Farr finally touched gloves at New York's Yankee Stadium before a crowd of approximately 32,000. Louis fought one of the hardest battles of his life. The bout was closely contested and went the entire 15 rounds, with Louis being unable to knock Farr down. Referee Arthur Donovan was even seen shaking Farr's hand after the bout, in apparent congratulation. Nevertheless, after the score was announced, Louis had won a controversial unanimous decision. Time described the scene thus: "After collecting the judges' votes, referee Arthur Donovan announced that Louis had won the fight on points. The crowd of 50,000 ... amazed that Farr had not been knocked out or even knocked down, booed the decision".

It seems the crowd believed that referee Arthur Donovan Sr. had raised Farr's glove in victory. Seven years later, in his published account of the fight, Donovan spoke of the "mistake" that may have led to this confusion. He wrote:

As Tommy walked back to his corner after shaking Louis' hand, I followed him and seized his glove. "Tommy, a wonderful perform—" I began ... Then I dropped his hand like a red-hot coal! He had started to raise his arm. He thought I had given him the fight and the world championship! I literally ran away, shaking my head and shouting. "No! No! No!" realising how I had raised his hopes for a few seconds only to dash them to the ground ... That's the last time my emotions will get the better of me in a prize fight! There was much booing at the announced result, but, as I say it, it was all emotional. I gave Tommy two rounds and one even—and both his winning rounds were close.

Speaking over the radio after the fight, Louis admitted that he had been hurt twice.

In preparation for the inevitable rematch with Schmeling, Louis tuned up with bouts against Nathan Mann and Harry Thomas.

==== Louis vs. Schmeling II ====
The rematch between Louis and Schmeling would become one of the most famous boxing matches of all time and is remembered as one of the major sports events of the 20th century. Following his defeat of Louis in 1936, Schmeling had become a national hero in Germany. Schmeling's victory over an African American was touted by Nazi officials as proof of their doctrine of Aryan superiority. When the rematch was scheduled, Louis retreated to his boxing camp in New Jersey and trained incessantly for the fight. A few weeks before the bout, Louis visited the White House, where President Franklin D. Roosevelt told him, "Joe, we need muscles like yours to beat Germany". Louis later admitted: "I knew I had to get Schmeling good. I had my own personal reasons and the whole damned country was depending on me".

When Schmeling arrived in New York City in June 1938 for the rematch, he was accompanied by a Nazi party publicist who issued statements that a black man could not defeat Schmeling and that when Schmeling won, his prize money would be used to build tanks in Germany. Schmeling's hotel was picketed by anti-Nazi protesters in the days before the fight.

On the night of June 22, 1938, Louis and Schmeling met for the second time in the boxing ring. The fight was held in Yankee Stadium before a crowd of 70,043. It was broadcast by radio to millions of listeners throughout the world (including 58% of radio-equipped U.S. households), with radio announcers reporting on the fight in English, German, Spanish, and Portuguese. Before the bout, Schmeling weighed in at 193 pounds; Louis weighed in at 198¾ pounds.

The fight lasted two minutes and four seconds. Louis battered Schmeling with a series of swift attacks, forcing him against the ropes and giving him a paralyzing body blow (Schmeling afterward claimed it was an illegal kidney punch). Schmeling was knocked down three times and only managed to throw two punches in the entire bout. On the third knockdown, Schmeling's trainer threw in the towel and referee Arthur Donovan stopped the fight.

Well-established as one of the most significant boxing matches in history, the fight has been widely regarded as among the most important or historic sports events of all time. It was the first time that many white Americans openly cheered for a black man against a white opponent.

==== "Bum of the Month Club" ====
In the 29 months from January 1939 through May 1941, Louis defended his title thirteen times, a frequency unmatched by any heavyweight champion since the end of the bare-knuckle era. The pace of his title defenses, combined with his convincing wins, earned Louis's opponents from this era the collective nickname "Bum of the Month Club". Notables of this lambasted pantheon include:

- World light heavyweight champion John Henry Lewis who, attempting to move up a weight class, was knocked out in the first round by Louis on January 25, 1939.
- "Two Ton" Tony Galento, who was able to knock Louis to the canvas with a left hook in the third round of their bout on June 28, 1939, before letting his guard down and being knocked out in the fourth.
- Chilean Arturo Godoy, whom Louis fought twice in 1940, on February 9 and June 20. Louis won the first bout by a split-decision, and the rematch by a knockout in the eighth round.
- Al McCoy, putative New England heavyweight champion, whose fight against Louis is probably best known for being the first heavyweight title bout held in Boston, Massachusetts, (at the Boston Garden on December 16, 1940). The popular local challenger dodged his way around Louis before being unable to respond to the sixth-round bell.
- Clarence "Red" Burman, who pressed Louis for nearly five rounds at Madison Square Garden on January 31, 1941, before succumbing to a series of body blows.
- Gus Dorazio, of whom Louis remarked, "At least he tried", after being leveled by a short right hand in the second round at Philadelphia's Convention Hall on February 17.
- Abe Simon, who endured thirteen rounds of punishment before 18,908 at Olympia Stadium in Detroit on March 21 before referee Sam Hennessy declared a TKO.
- Tony Musto, who, at 5'7½" and 198 pounds, was known as "Baby Tank". Despite a unique crouching style, Musto was slowly worn down over eight and a half rounds in St. Louis on April 8, and the fight was called a TKO because of a severe cut over Musto's eye.
- Buddy Baer (brother of former champion Max), who was leading the May 23, 1941, bout in Washington, D.C., until an eventual barrage by Louis, capped by a hit at the sixth round bell. Referee Arthur Donovan disqualified Baer before the beginning of the seventh round as a result of stalling by Baer's manager.

Despite its derogatory nickname, most of the group were top-ten heavyweights. Of the 12 fighters Louis faced during this period, five were rated by The Ring as top-10 heavyweights in the year they fought Louis: Galento (overall #2 heavyweight in 1939), Bob Pastor (#3, 1939), Godoy (#3, 1940), Simon (#6, 1941) and Baer (#8, 1941). Four others (Musto, Dorazio, Burman and Johnny Paychek) were ranked in the top 10 in a different year.

==== Louis vs. Conn ====
Louis's string of lightly regarded competition ended with his bout against Billy Conn, the light heavyweight champion and a highly regarded contender. The fighters met on June 18, 1941, in front of a crowd of 54,487 fans at the Polo Grounds in New York City. The fight turned out to be what is commonly considered one of the greatest heavyweight boxing fights of all time.

Conn would not gain weight for the challenge against Louis, saying instead that he would rely on a "hit and run" strategy.

However, Louis had clearly underestimated Conn's threat. In his autobiography, Joe Louis said:

I made a mistake going into that fight. I knew Conn was kinda small and I didn't want them to say in the papers that I beat up on some little guy so the day before the fight I did a little roadwork to break a sweat and drank as little water as possible so I could weigh in under 200 pounds. Chappie was as mad as hell. But Conn was a clever fighter, he was like a mosquito, he'd sting and move.

Conn had the better of the fight through 12 rounds, although Louis was able to stun Conn with a left hook in the fifth, cutting his eye and nose. By the eighth round, Louis began suffering from dehydration. By the twelfth round, Louis was exhausted, with Conn ahead on two of three boxing scorecards. But against the advice of his corner, Conn continued to closely engage Louis in the later stages of the fight. Louis made the most of the opportunity, knocking Conn out with two seconds left in the thirteenth round.

The contest created an instant rivalry that Louis's career had lacked since the Schmeling era, and a rematch with Conn was planned for late 1942. The rematch had to be abruptly canceled, however, after Conn broke his hand in a much-publicized fight with his father-in-law, Major League ballplayer Jimmy "Greenfield" Smith. By the time Conn was ready for the rematch, the Japanese attack on Pearl Harbor had taken place.

== World War II ==
Louis fought a charity bout for the Navy Relief Society against his former opponent Buddy Baer on January 9, 1942, which raised $47,000 for the fund. The next day, he volunteered to enlist as a private in the United States Army at Camp Upton, Long Island. Newsreel cameras recorded his induction, including a staged scene in which a soldier-clerk asked, "What's your occupation?", to which Louis replied, "Fighting and let us at them Japs".

Another military charity bout on March 27, 1942, (against another former opponent, Abe Simon) netted $36,146. Before the fight, Louis had spoken at a Relief Fund dinner, saying of the war effort, "We'll win, 'cause we're on God's side". The media widely reported the comment, instigating a surge of popularity for Louis. Slowly, the press began to eliminate its stereotypical racial references when covering Louis and instead treated him as a sports hero. Despite the public relations boon, Louis's charitable fights proved financially costly. Although he saw none of the roughly $90,000 raised by these and other charitable fights, the IRS later credited these amounts as taxable income paid to Louis. After the war, the IRS pursued the issue.

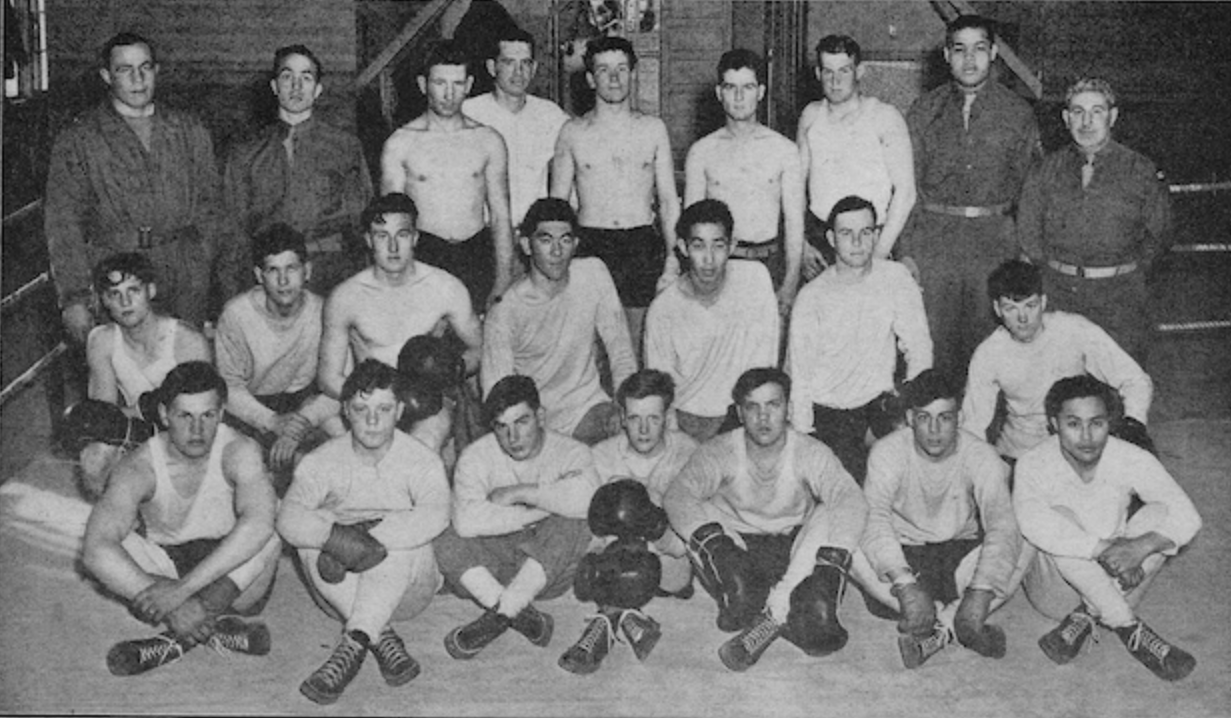
A group of "ring rookies" at Fort Riley, Kansas. Louis O'Jibway (far left) served as the head coach. Sid Marks (far right) was the assistant coach. John Moore (center rear), was a trainer. Joe Louis (second-from-right) served as supervisor.

For basic training, Louis was assigned to a segregated cavalry unit based in Fort Riley, Kansas. The assignment was at the suggestion of his friend and lawyer Truman Gibson, who knew of Louis's love for horsemanship. Gibson had previously become a civilian advisor to the War Department, in charge of investigating claims of harassment against black soldiers. Accordingly, Louis used this personal connection to help the cause of various black soldiers with whom he came into contact. In one noted episode, Louis contacted Gibson in order to facilitate the Officer Candidate School (OCS) applications of a group of black recruits at Fort Riley, which had been inexplicably delayed for several months. Among the OCS applications Louis facilitated was that of young UCLA athletic legend Jackie Robinson, later to break the baseball color barrier. The episode spawned a personal friendship between the two men.

Realizing Louis's potential for raising esprit de corps among the troops, the Army placed him in its Special Services Division rather than sending him into combat. Louis went on a celebrity tour with other notables, including fellow boxer Sugar Ray Robinson. He traveled more than 35,000 km (22,000 mi) and staged 96 boxing exhibitions before two million soldiers. In England during 1944, he was reported to have signed as a player for Liverpool Football Club as a publicity stunt.

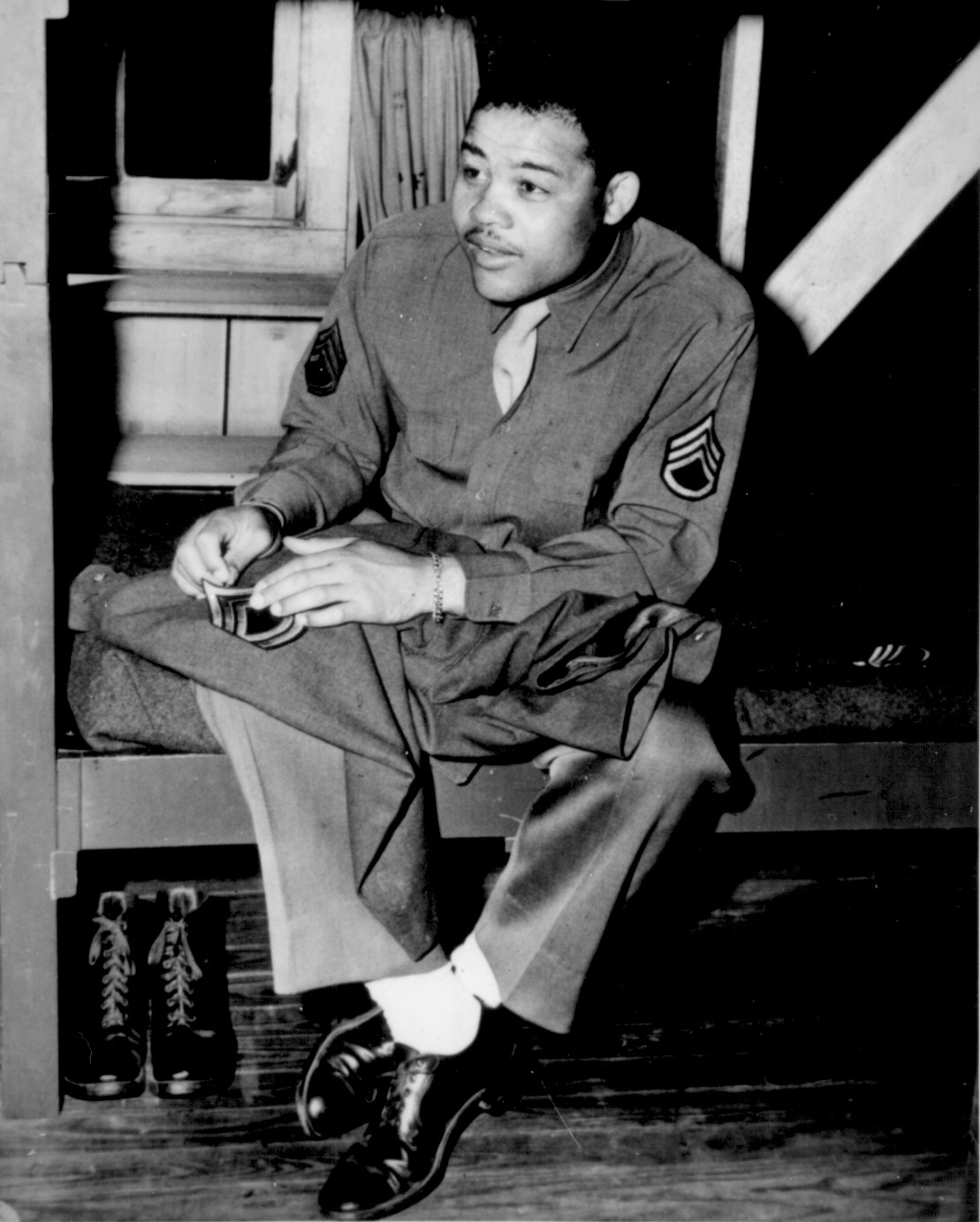
Louis in the Army

In addition to his travels, Louis was the focus of a media recruitment campaign encouraging African-American men to enlist in the Armed Services, despite the military's racial segregation. When he was asked about his decision to enter the racially segregated U.S. Army, he said: "Lots of things wrong with America, but Hitler ain't going to fix them". In 1943, Louis made an appearance in the wartime Hollywood musical This Is the Army, directed by Michael Curtiz. He appeared as himself in a musical number, "The Well-Dressed Man in Harlem", which emphasized the importance of African-American soldiers and promoted their enlistment.

Louis's celebrity power was not directed solely toward African Americans. In a famous wartime recruitment slogan, he echoed his prior comments of 1942: "We'll win, because we're on God's side". The publicity of the campaign made Louis widely popular stateside, even outside the world of sports. Never before had white Americans embraced a black man as their representative to the world.

Although Louis never saw combat, his military service saw challenges of its own. During his travels, he often experienced blatant racism. On one occasion, a military policeman (MP) ordered Louis and Ray Robinson to move to a bench in the rear of an Alabama Army camp bus depot. "We ain't moving", said Louis. The MP tried to arrest them, but Louis forcefully argued the pair out of the situation. In another incident, Louis exerted his influence to persuade a commanding officer to drop charges against now Lt. Jackie Robinson, who had resisted being told to move his seat on a southern bus, and retaliated against a Captain who had called Robinson a "nigger".

Louis was eventually promoted to the rank of technical sergeant on April 9, 1945. On September 23 of the same year, he was awarded the Legion of Merit (a military decoration rarely awarded to enlisted soldiers) for "incalculable contribution to the general morale". Receipt of the honor qualified him for immediate release from military service on October 1, 1945.

== Later career and retirement ==
Louis emerged from his wartime service significantly in debt. In addition to his looming tax bill—which had not been finally determined at the time, but was estimated at greater than $100,000—Jacobs claimed that Louis owed him $250,000.

Despite the financial pressure on Louis to resume boxing, his long-awaited rematch against Billy Conn had to be postponed to the summer of 1946, when weather conditions could accommodate a large outdoor audience.

During the build up Louis was asked "Will you chase him if he runs backwards", this prompted the champion to respond with now the famous line: "He can run, but he can't hide".

On June 19, a disappointing 40,000 saw the rematch at Yankee Stadium, in which Louis was not seriously tested. Conn, whose skills had deteriorated during the long layoff, largely avoided contact until being dispatched by knockout in the eighth round. Although the attendance did not meet expectations, the fight was still the most profitable of Louis's career to date. His share of the purse was $600,000, of which Louis's managers got $140,000, his ex-wife $66,000 and the U.S. state of New York $30,000.

Joe Louis with Jean Anderson, Chicago, 1947

After trouble finding another suitable opponent, on December 5, 1947, Louis met Jersey Joe Walcott, a 33-year-old veteran with a 44–11–2 record. Walcott entered the fight as a 10-to-1 underdog. Nevertheless, Walcott knocked down Louis twice in the first four rounds. Most observers in Madison Square Garden felt Walcott dominated the 15-round fight. When Louis was declared the winner in a split decision, the crowd booed.

Louis was under no illusion about the state of his boxing skills, yet he was too embarrassed to quit after the Walcott fight. Determined to win and retire with his title intact, Louis signed on for a rematch. On June 25, 1948, about 42,000 people came to Yankee Stadium to see the aging champion, who weighed 213.5 pounds (96.8 kg), the heaviest of his career to date. Walcott knocked Louis down in the third round, but Louis survived to knock out Walcott in the eleventh.

Louis would not defend his title again before announcing his retirement from boxing on March 1, 1949. In his bouts with Conn and Walcott, it had become apparent that Louis was no longer the fighter he had once been. As he had done earlier in his career, however, Louis would continue to appear in numerous exhibition matches worldwide. In August 1949 Cab Calloway rendered homage to the "king of the ring" with his song Ol' Joe Louis.

=== Comeback ===
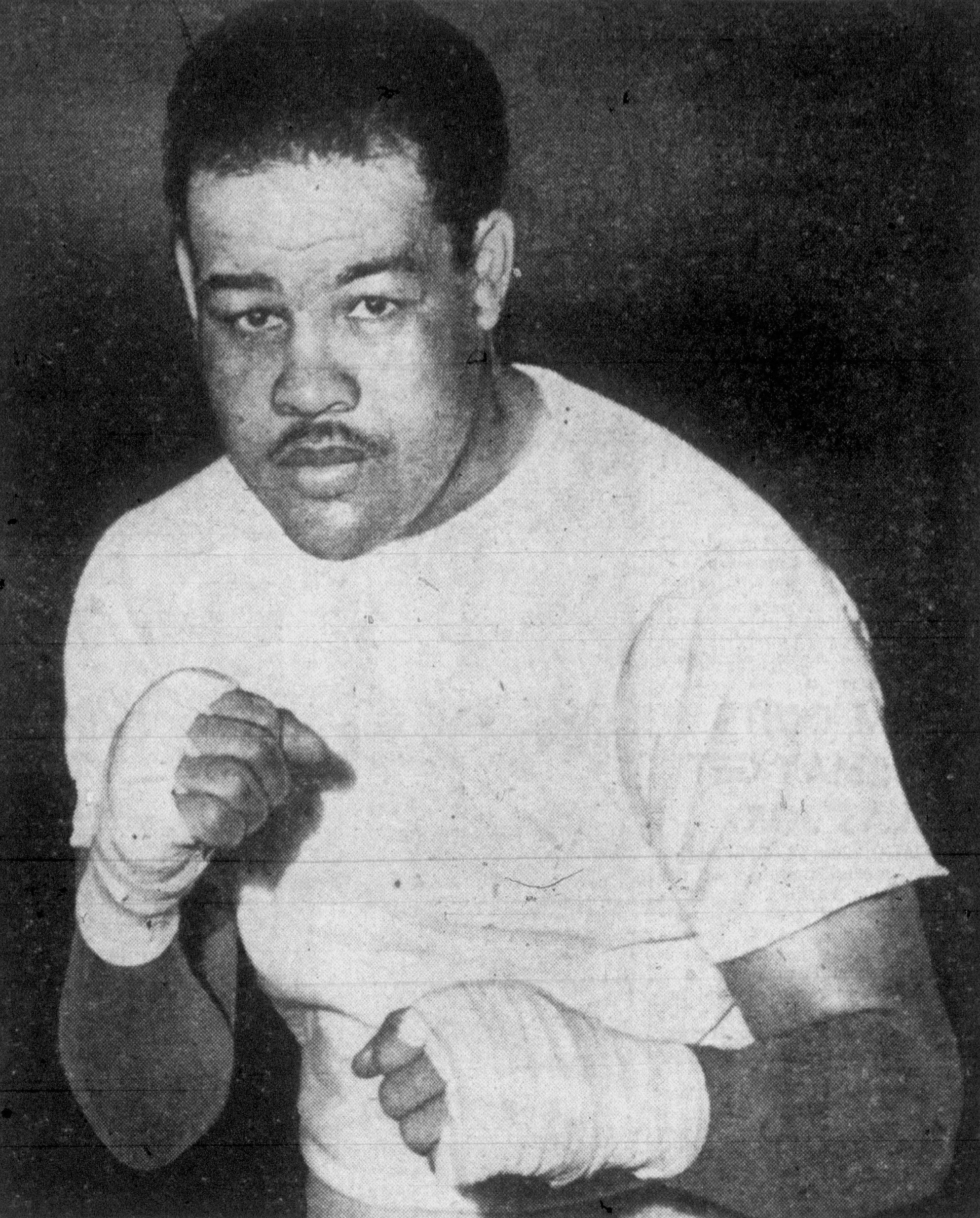
Louis, circa 1950

At the time of Louis's initial retirement, the IRS was still completing its investigation of his prior tax returns, which had always been handled by Mike Jacobs's personal accountant. In May 1950, the IRS finished a full audit of Louis's past returns and announced that, with interest and penalties, he owed the government more than $500,000. Louis had no choice but to return to the ring.

After asking Gibson to take over his personal finances and switching his management from Jacobs and Roxborough to Marshall Miles, the Louis camp negotiated a deal with the IRS under which Louis would come out of retirement, with all Louis's net proceeds going to the IRS. A match with Ezzard Charles—who had acquired the vacant heavyweight title in June 1949 by outpointing Walcott—was set for September 27, 1950. By then, Louis was 36 years old and had been away from competitive boxing for two years. Weighing in at 218 pounds, Louis was still strong, but his reflexes were gone and Charles repeatedly beat him to the punch. By the end of the fight, Louis was cut above both eyes, one of which was shut tight by swelling. He knew he had lost even before Charles was declared the winner. The result was not the only disappointing aspect of the fight for Louis; only 22,357 spectators paid to witness the event at Yankee Stadium, and his share of the purse was a mere $100,458. Louis had to continue fighting.

After facing several club-level opponents and scoring a knockout victory over EBU heavyweight champion Lee Savold, the International Boxing Club guaranteed Louis $300,000 to face undefeated heavyweight contender Rocky Marciano on October 26, 1951. Despite his being a 6-to-5 favorite, few boxing insiders believed Louis had a chance. Marciano himself was reluctant to participate in the bout, but was understanding of Louis's position: "This is the last guy on earth I want to fight". It was feared, particularly among those who had witnessed Marciano's punching power first-hand, that Louis's unwillingness to quit would result in serious injury. Fighting back tears, Ferdie Pacheco said in the SportsCentury documentary about Louis's bout with Marciano, "He [Louis] wasn't just going to lose. He was going to take a vicious, savage beating. Before the eyes of the nation, Joe Louis, an American hero if ever there was one, was going to get beaten up". Louis was dropped in the eighth round by a Marciano left and knocked through the ropes and out of the ring less than thirty seconds later.

In the dressing room after the fight, Louis's Army touring companion, Sugar Ray Robinson, wept. Marciano also attempted to console Louis, saying, "I'm sorry, Joe". "What's the use of crying?" Louis said. "The better man won. I guess everything happens for the best".

After facing Marciano, with the prospect of another significant payday all but gone, Louis retired for good from professional boxing. He would, as before, continue to tour on the exhibition circuit, with his last contest taking place on December 16, 1951, in Taipei, Taiwan, against Corporal Buford J. deCordova.

== Taxes and financial troubles ==
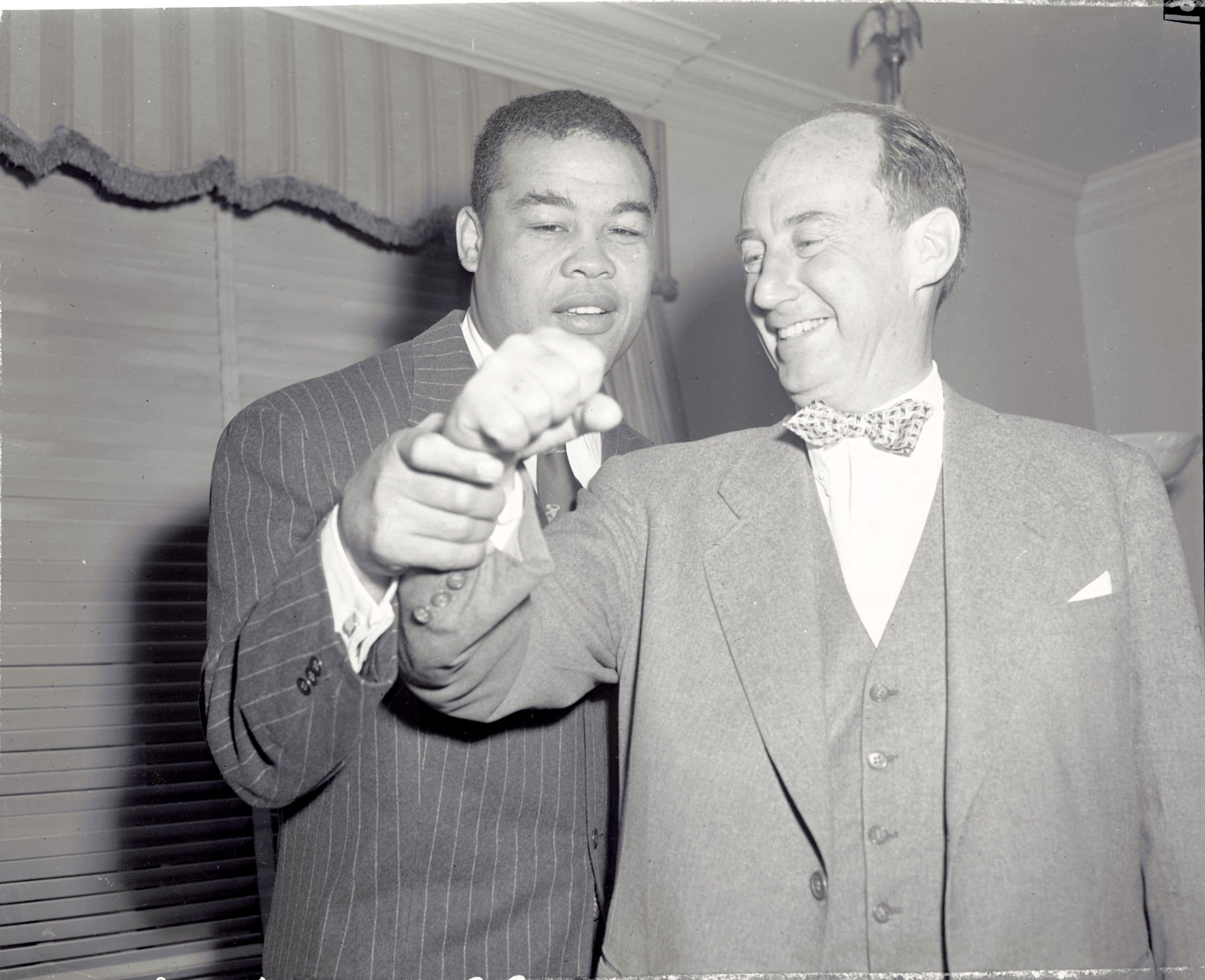
Louis showing Illinois governor and Democratic presidential candidate Adlai Stevenson how to throw a right hook punch, October 22, 1952.

Despite Louis's lucrative purses over the years, most of the proceeds went to his handlers. Of the over $4.6 million earned during his boxing career, Louis himself received only about $800,000. Louis was nevertheless extremely generous to his family, paying for homes, cars and education for his parents and siblings, often with money fronted by Jacobs. He invested in a number of businesses, all of which eventually failed, including the Joe Louis Restaurant, the Joe Louis Insurance Company, a softball team called the Brown Bombers, the Joe Louis Milk Company, Joe Louis pomade (hair product), Joe Louis Punch (a drink), the Louis-Rower P.R. firm, a horse farm and the Rhumboogie Café in Chicago. He gave liberally to the government as well, paying back the city of Detroit for any welfare money his family had received.

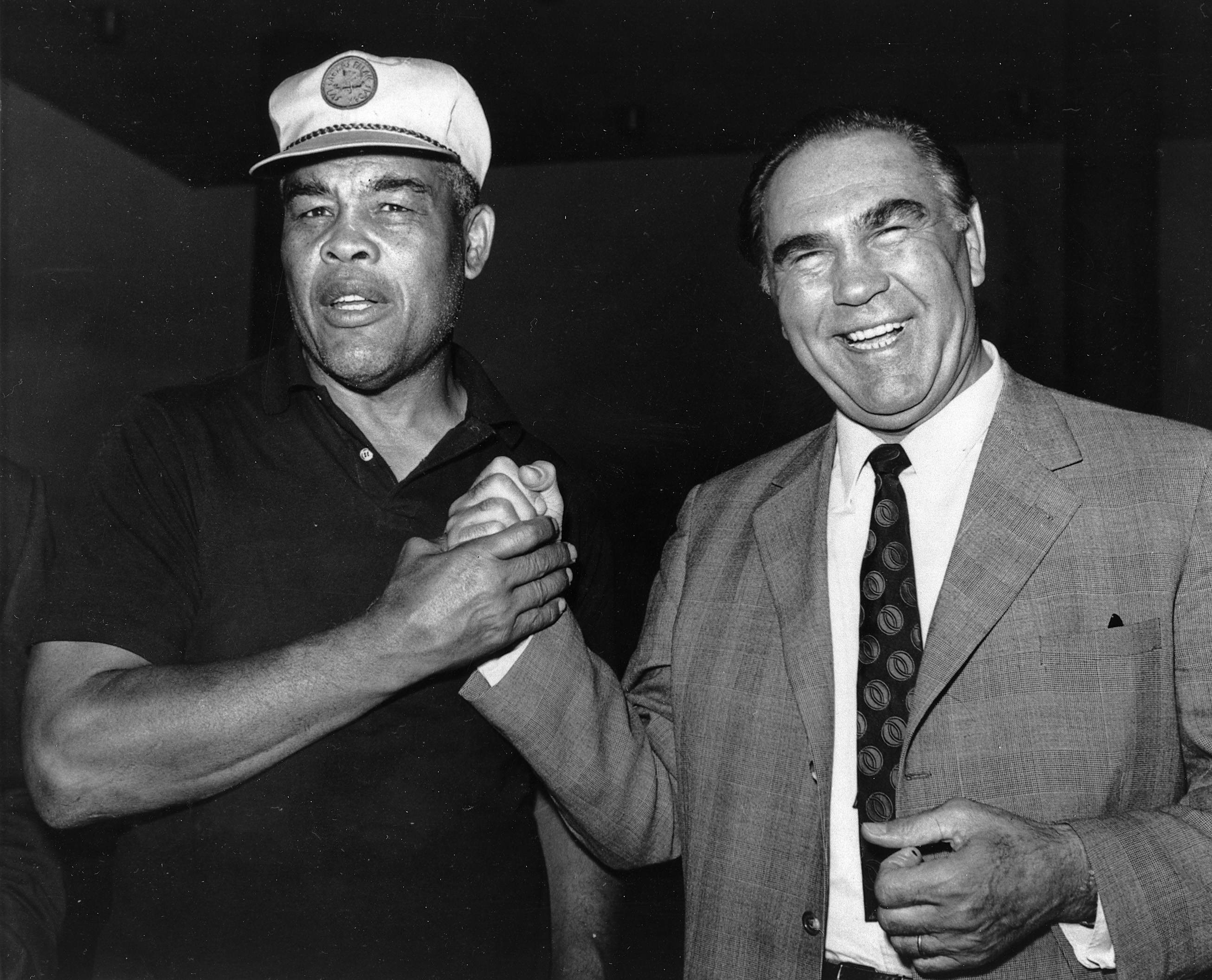
Louis and Max Schmeling, 1971. The former rivals became close friends in later life.

A combination of this largesse and government intervention eventually put Louis in severe financial straits. His entrusting of his finances to former manager Mike Jacobs haunted him. After the $500,000 IRS tax bill was assessed, with interest accumulating every year, the need for cash precipitated Louis's post-retirement comeback. Even though his comeback earned him significant purses, the incremental tax rate in place at the time (90%) meant that these boxing proceeds did not even keep pace with interest on Louis's tax debt. As a result, by the end of the 1950s, he owed over $1 million in taxes and interest. In 1953, when Louis's mother died, the IRS appropriated the $667 she had willed to Louis. To bring in money, Louis engaged in numerous activities outside the ring. He appeared on various quiz shows, and an old Army friend, Ash Resnick, gave Louis a job greeting tourists to the Caesars Palace hotel in Las Vegas, where Resnick was an executive. For income, Louis even became a professional wrestler. He made his professional wrestling debut on March 16, 1956, in Washington, D.C. at the Uline Arena, defeating Cowboy Rocky Lee. After defeating Lee in a few matches, Louis discovered he had a heart ailment and retired from wrestling competition. However, he continued as a wrestling referee until 1972.

Louis remained a popular celebrity in his twilight years. His friends included former rival Max Schmeling, who provided Louis with financial assistance during his retirement—and mobster Frank Lucas, who, disgusted with the government's treatment of Louis, once paid off a $50,000 tax lien held against him. These payments, along with an eventual agreement in the early 1960s by the IRS to limit its collections to an amount based on Louis's current income, allowed Louis to live comfortably toward the end of his life.

After the Louis-Schmeling fight, Jack Dempsey expressed the opinion that he was glad he never had to face Joe Louis in the ring. When Louis fell on hard financial times, Dempsey served as honorary chairman of a fund to assist Louis.

== Professional wrestling career ==
In an effort to improve his financial situation, Joe Louis got involved with professional wrestling in 1954. His first recorded match was on August 6, 1954, in a victory over Bobby Nelson.

In 1956, Louis went on a short-lived wrestling tour arranged by promoter Ray Fabiani. This was cut short after a match against Cowboy Rocky Lee on May 31, 1956, when Louis' ribs were cracked, and he subsequently lost his wrestling license.

Louis returned to the wrestling ring on March 15, 1959, where he lost to Buddy Rogers in Columbus, Ohio. This led to a hiatus until the late 1960s and early 1970s, when he engaged in several wrestling matches. His last match was in 1973 but he continued as a referee.

== Professional golf ==
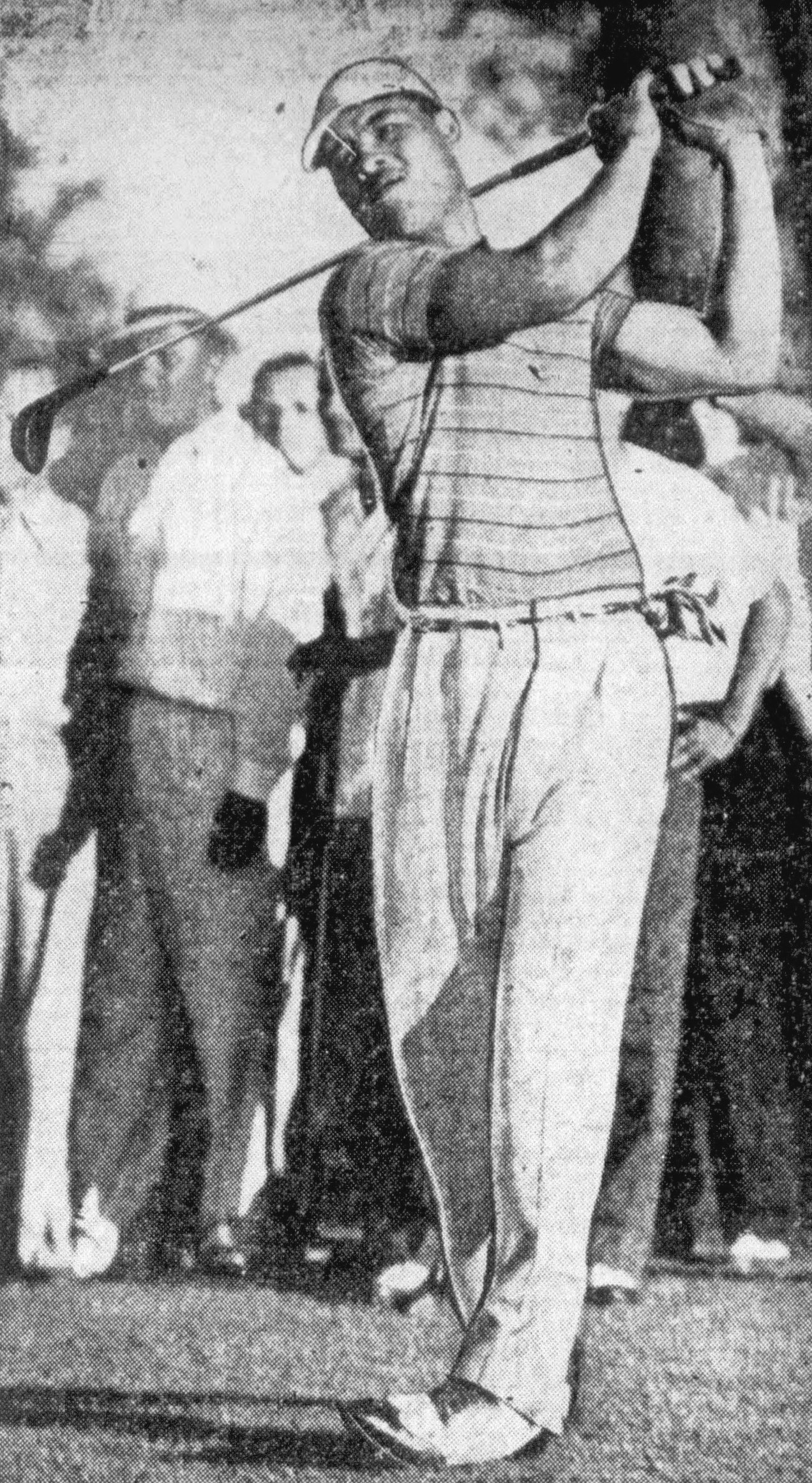
Louis golfing in 1945

One of Louis' other passions was the game of golf, in which he also played a historic role. He was a long-time devotee of the sport since being introduced to the game before the first Schmeling fight in 1936. In 1952, Louis was invited to play as an amateur in the San Diego Open on a sponsor's exemption, which was announced at the time as the first instance of an African-American to play in a PGA Tour event (in fact, professional Howard Wheeler was one of seven African-Americans to compete in the Tam O'Shanter Open in Niles, Illinois in 1942, and Wheeler appeared in subsequent PGA-sanctioned events in Philadelphia in the 1940s, qualifying for the 1950 and 1951 U.S. Open).

Initially, the PGA of America was reluctant to allow Louis to enter the event, having a bylaw at the time limiting PGA membership to white Americans. Louis's celebrity status eventually pushed the PGA toward removing the bylaw, although the "Caucasian only" clause in the PGA of America's constitution was not formally amended until November 1961. The change, however, paved the way for the first generation of African-American professional golfers such as Calvin Peete.

Two weeks after the 1952 San Diego Open, Louis was invited to play in the 1952 Tucson Open. Louis shot a 69 in the opening round and a 72 in the 2nd round. His 2-round total of 141 enabled him to make the cut. Joe Louis is the only champion athlete from another sport ever to make the cut in a PGA event.

Louis himself financially supported the careers of several other early black professional golfers, such as Bill Spiller, Ted Rhodes, Howard Wheeler, James Black, Clyde Martin and Charlie Sifford. His son, Joe Louis Barrow Jr., would become a national spokesman for diversity in golf and retired in 2017 after serving 18 years as CEO of The First Tee.

In 2009, the PGA of America granted posthumous membership to Ted Rhodes, John Shippen and Bill Spiller, who were denied the opportunity to become PGA members during their professional careers. The PGA also has granted posthumous honorary membership to Louis. A public golf course in Riverdale, Illinois, just south of Chicago, is named for him.

== Personal life ==
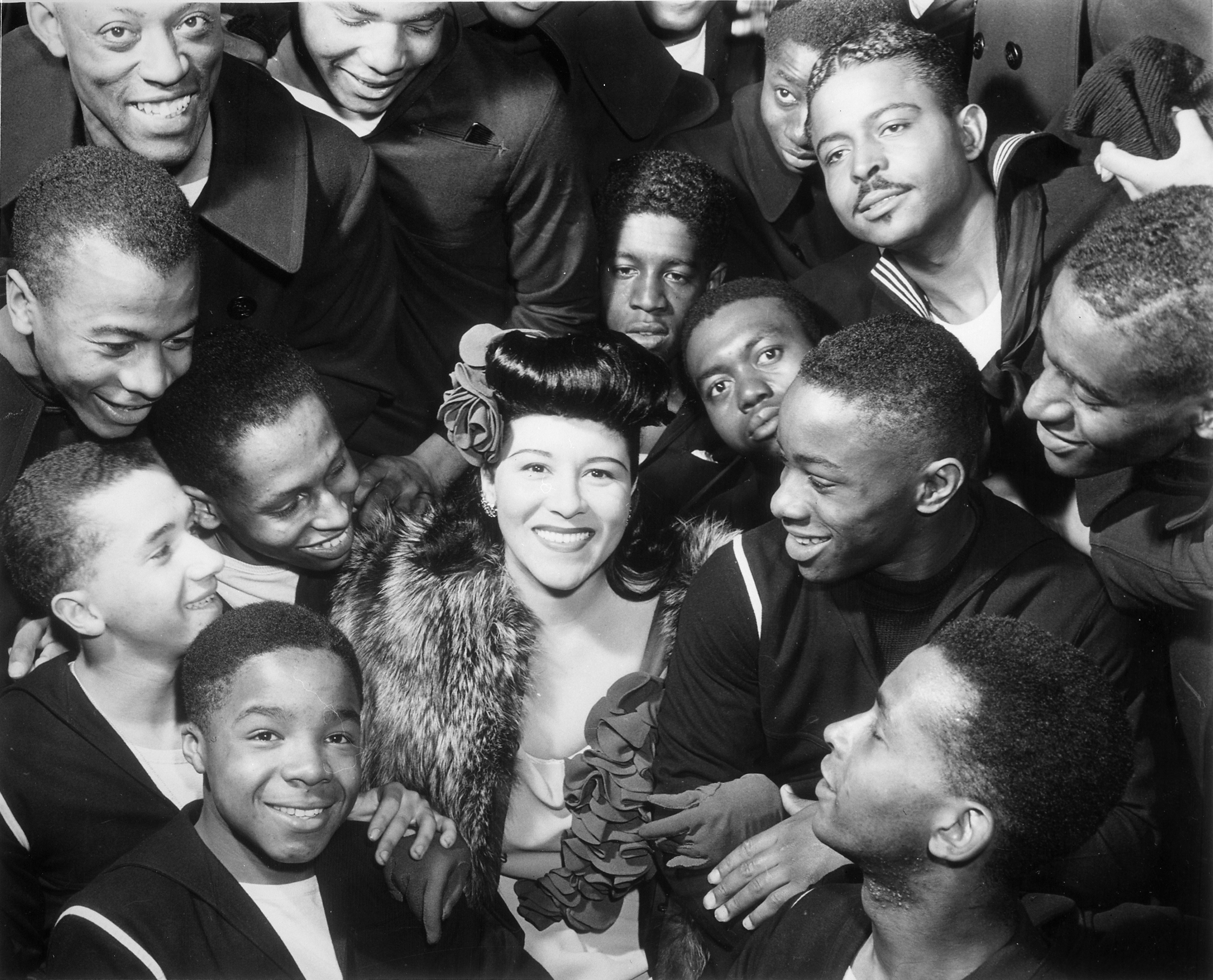
Visiting Naval Station Great Lakes during World War II, Marva Louis was surrounded by some 2,000 recruits who gathered in a regimental drill hall to hear her sing.

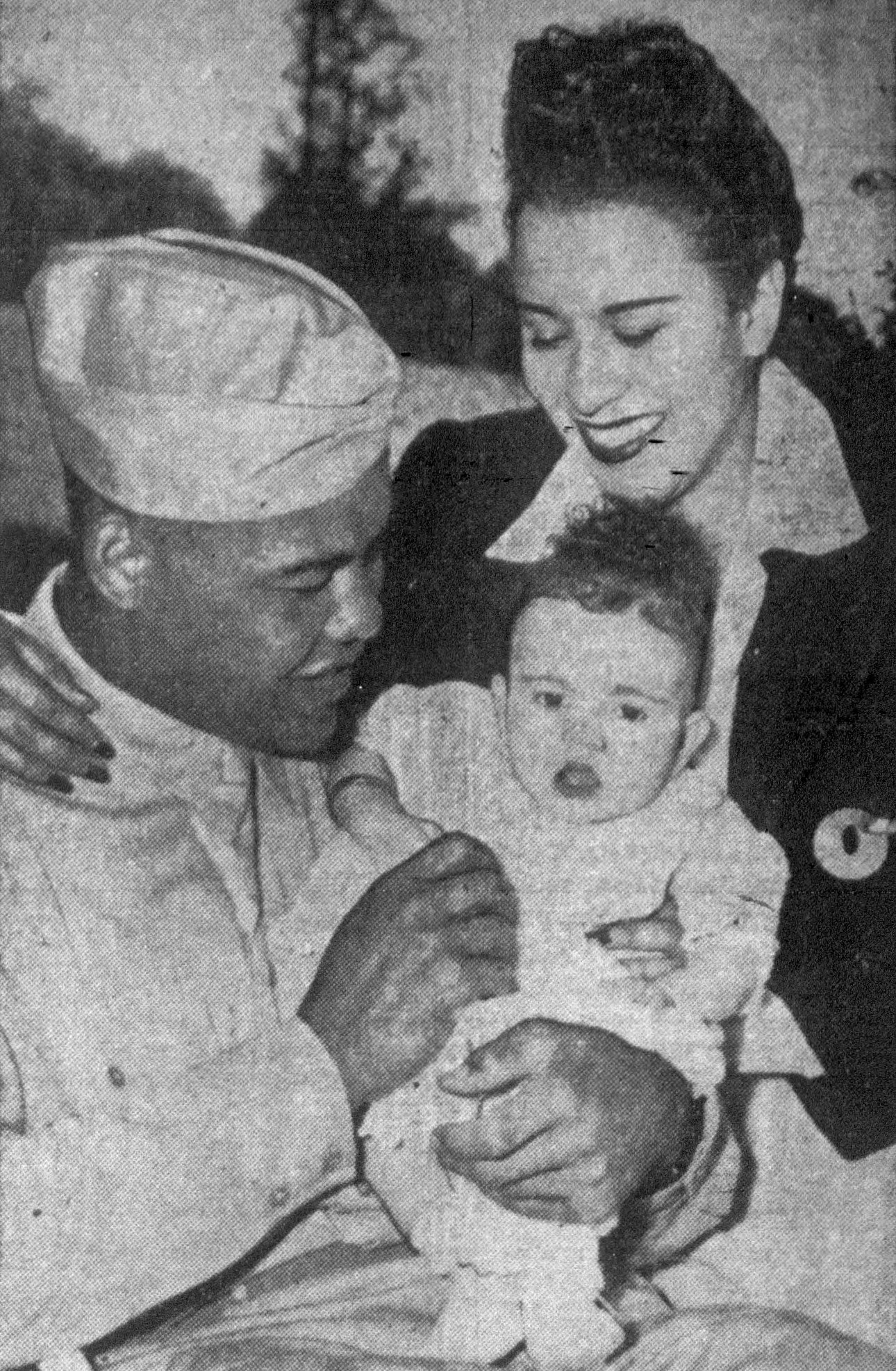
Louis with Marva and daughter Jacqueline in 1943

I did the best I could with what I had.

— Joe Louis (cited by Philip Roth)

Louis had two children with his wife, Marva Trotter Louis: daughter Jacqueline (born 1943) and son Joseph Louis Barrow Jr. (born 1947). They divorced in March 1945 only to remarry a year later, but were again divorced in February 1949. Marva moved on to an acting and modeling career. On Christmas Day 1955, Louis married Rose Morgan, a successful Harlem businesswoman; their marriage was annulled in 1958. Louis's final marriage—to Martha Jefferson, a lawyer from Los Angeles, on St. Patrick's Day 1959—lasted until his death. They had four children: another son named Joseph Louis Barrow Jr, John Louis Barrow, Joyce Louis Barrow, and Janet Louis Barrow. The younger Joe Louis Barrow Jr. lives in New York City and is involved in boxing. Though married four times, Louis discreetly enjoyed the company of other women such as Lena Horne and Edna Mae Harris.

Joe and Marva Louis endorsed and campaigned for liberal, anti-segregation Republican candidate Wendell Willkie in the 1940 United States presidential election. Louis said:

This country has been good to me. It gave me everything I have. I have never come out for any candidate before but I think Wendell L. Willkie will give us a square deal. So I am for Willkie because I think he will help my people, and I figure my people should be for him, too.

In 1957 then Teamsters Vice President Jimmy Hoffa was on trial for bribery. Given that the jury was composed of eight blacks and four whites, Hoffa made overtures to the black jurors. Paul Dorfman and Barney Baker arranged for Louis to walk up and hug Hoffa in view of the jurors. Hoffa was found not guilty. Dorfman approached the International Boxing Club, run by his friend Truman Gibson, to make this arrangement, while Baker paid Louis' travel and hotel expenses.

Drugs took a toll on Louis in his later years. In 1969, he was hospitalized after collapsing on a New York City street. While the incident was at first credited to "physical breakdown", underlying problems would soon surface. In 1970, he spent five months at the Colorado Psychiatric Hospital and the Veterans Administration Hospital in Denver, hospitalized by his wife, Martha, and his son, Joe Louis Barrow Jr., for paranoia. In a 1971 book, Brown Bomber, by Barney Nagler, Louis disclosed the truth about these incidents, stating that his collapse in 1969 had been caused by cocaine, and that his subsequent hospitalization had been prompted by his fear of a plot to destroy him. Strokes and heart ailments caused Louis's condition to deteriorate further later in the decade. He had surgery to correct an aortic aneurysm in 1977 and thereafter used a POV/scooter for a mobility aid.

He was a Christian, a member of the Calvary Baptist Church of Detroit.

== Death ==
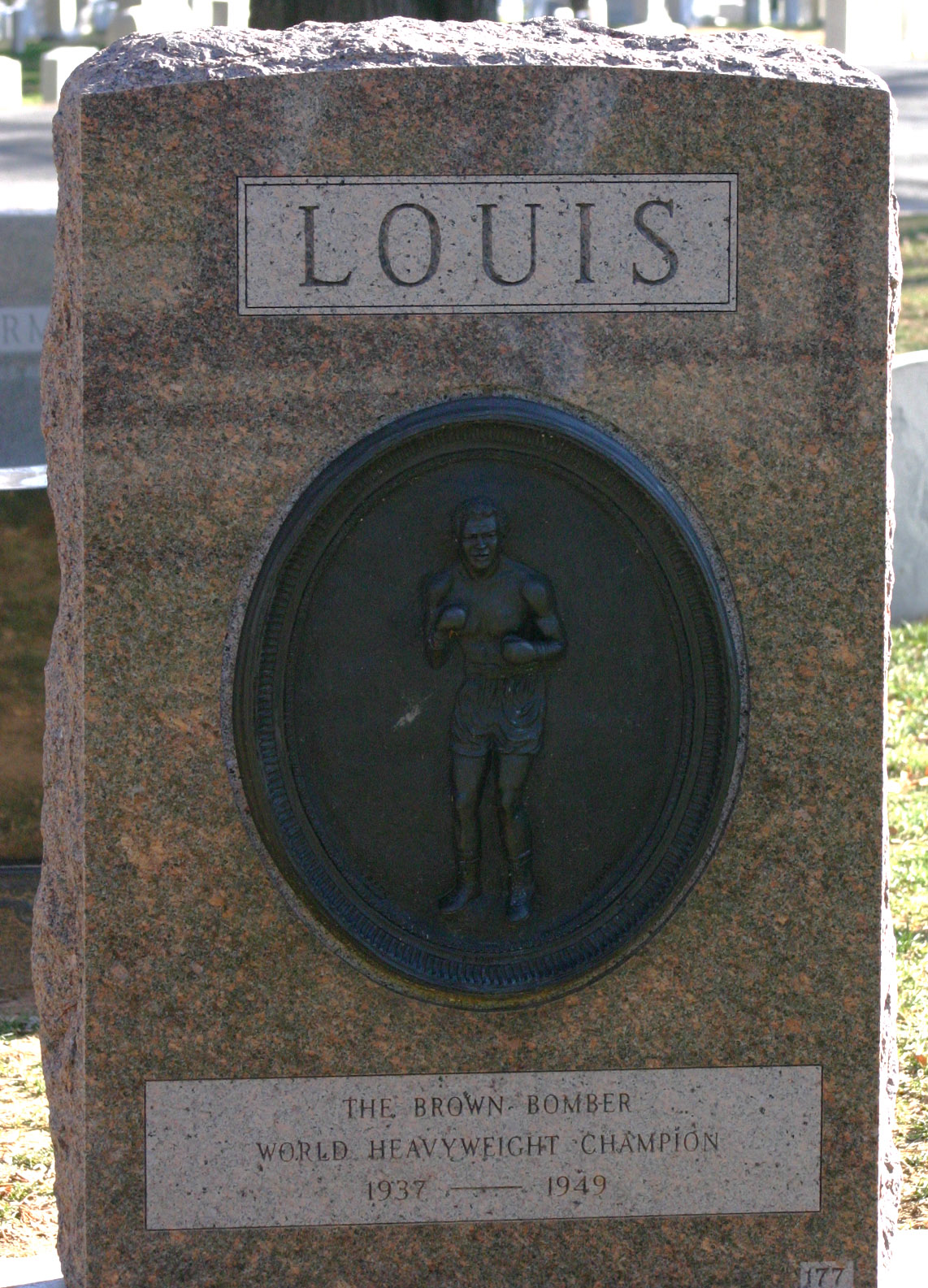
Joe Louis' headstone in Arlington National Cemetery, Virginia

Louis died of cardiac arrest in Desert Springs Hospital near Las Vegas on April 12, 1981, just hours after his last public appearance viewing the Larry Holmes–Trevor Berbick heavyweight championship fight. President Ronald Reagan waived the eligibility rules for burial at Arlington National Cemetery and Louis was buried there with full military honors on April 21, 1981. His funeral was paid for in part by former competitor and friend Max Schmeling, who also acted as a pallbearer.

== Film and television ==
Louis appeared in six full-length films and two short films.

Louis had a starring role in the 1938 race film Spirit of Youth, in which he played a boxer with many similarities to himself.

In 1943, he was featured in the full-length movie This is the Army, which starred Ronald Reagan, with appearances by Kate Smith singing "God Bless America" and Irving Berlin, and which was directed by Michael Curtiz.

In 1946 he played himself in Joe Palooka, Champ, a movie based on the comic strip Joe Palooka created by Ham Fisher.

Louis once again played himself in the short film Johnny At The Fair in 1947. The short film takes place at the Canadian National Exhibition (CNE) where a boy becomes separated from his parents and meets a host of celebrities including former Canadian Prime Minister William Lyon MacKenzie King and champion figure skater Barbara Ann Scott.

In 1948 Louis starred as himself in Joseph Lerner's The Fight Never Ends.

In 1955 Louis was once again cast as himself in a small role in The Square Jungle written by George Zuckerman and starring Tony Curtis.

Louis's last feature-length movie role took place in the 1970 comedy The Phynx in which a rock band goes on tour in Albania in order to save Americans being held hostage.

He was a guest on the television show You Bet Your Life in 1955. In 1977, Louis made a small cameo appearance on the TV series Quincy M.E.

In 1953, Robert Gordon directed a movie about Louis's life, The Joe Louis Story. Filmed in Hollywood, it starred Golden Gloves fighter and Louis lookalike Coley Wallace in the title role. The film suffered from low budget and production values, sluggishly intercutting clips from Louis's actual bouts with indifferent audio sync.

== Legacy ==
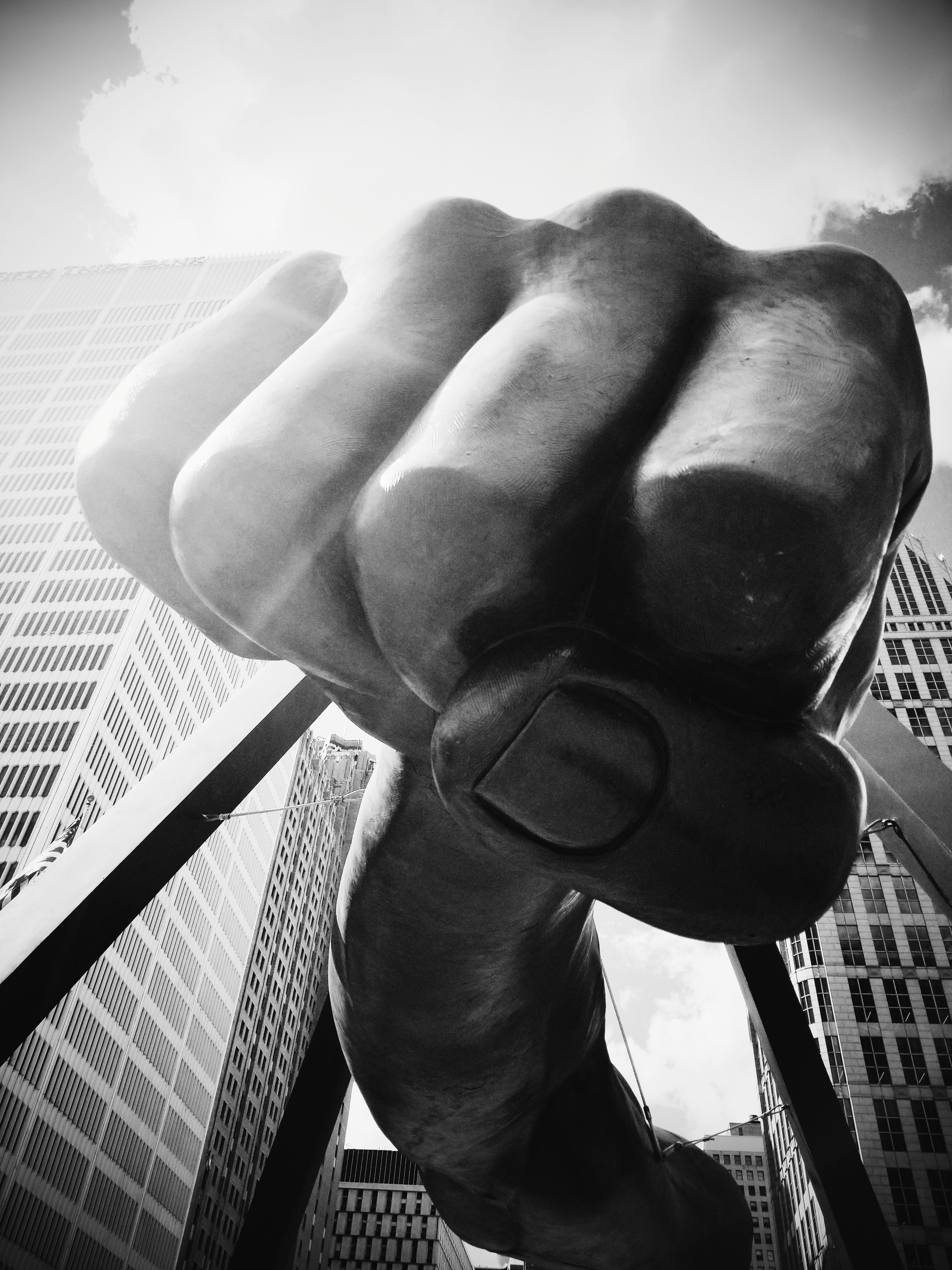
Monument to Joe Louis, erected in October 1986 in Detroit

Louis is widely regarded as one of the greatest boxers of all time. He reigned as the world heavyweight champion from 1937 to 1949, 11 years and 8 months, the record in any division. During his reign, Louis defended the title 25 times, the heavyweight record. Louis has won the most world heavyweight title fights in history, at 26, defeating 21 different fighters. In addition to his accomplishments inside the ring, Louis uttered two of boxing's most famous observations: "He can run, but he can't hide" and "Everyone has a plan until they've been hit".

Louis was named Fighter of the Year by The Ring magazine four times, in 1936, 1938, 1939, and 1941. His bouts against Max Baer, Max Schmeling, Tommy Farr, Bob Pastor and Billy Conn were each named Fight of the Year by the magazine. In 1941, he received the Sugar Ray Robinson Award as Fighter of the Year by the Boxing Writers Association of America (BWAA). In 1967, he was honored with the Barney Nagler Award by the BWAA for long and meritorious service. In a 1978 poll conducted by HBO, members of the Boxing Writers Association of America voted Louis the greatest heavyweight in boxing history. In 2005, the International Boxing Research Organization ranked Louis as the greatest heavyweight of all time, and The Ring placed him first on its list of the "100 greatest punchers of all time." Hank Kaplan, Bert Sugar, Teddy Atlas, George Foreman, Joe Frazier, and Sugar Ray Robinson named Louis as the greatest heavyweight boxer of all time.

Louis is also remembered in sports outside of boxing. A former indoor sports venue was named after him in Detroit, the Joe Louis Arena, where the Detroit Red Wings played their NHL games from 1979 to 2017. In 1936, Vince Leah, then a writer for The Winnipeg Tribune used Joe Louis's nickname to refer to the Winnipeg Football Club after a game. From that point, the team became known popularly as the Winnipeg Blue Bombers.

His recognition also transcends the sporting world. In 2002, scholar Molefi Kete Asante listed Joe Louis on his list of 100 Greatest African Americans. On August 26, 1982, Louis was posthumously approved for the Congressional Gold Medal, the highest award given to civilians by the U.S. legislative branch. Congress stated that he "did so much to bolster the spirit of the American people during one of the most crucial times in American history and which have endured throughout the years as a symbol of strength for the nation". Following Louis's death, President Ronald Reagan said, "Joe Louis was more than a sports legend—his career was an indictment of racial bigotry and a source of pride and inspiration to millions of white and black people around the world".

On October 16, 1986, a memorial to Louis was dedicated at Jefferson Avenue and Woodward in Detroit. The sculpture, commissioned by Time, Inc. and executed by Robert Graham, is a 24-foot-long (7.3 m) arm with a fisted hand suspended by a 24-foot-high (7.3 m) pyramidal framework. It represents the power of his punch both inside and outside the ring.

In an interview with Arsenio Hall in the late 1980s, former heavyweight champion Muhammad Ali stated that his two biggest influences in boxing were Sugar Ray Robinson and Joe Louis. After Joe Louis died, Ali stated, "Whatever I said before, I don't mean it, 'cause Joe Louis was the greatest." Ali then told the Washington Post:

Look at Joe's life. Everybody loved Joe. He would have been marked as evil if he was evil, but everybody loved Joe. From black folks to red-neck Mississippi crackers, they loved him. They're all crying. That shows you. Howard Hughes dies, with all his billions, not a tear. Joe Louis, everybody cried.

On February 27, 2010, an 8-foot (2.4 m) bronze statue of Louis was unveiled in his Alabama hometown. The statue, by sculptor Casey Downing Jr., sits on a base of red granite outside the Chambers County Courthouse.

In 1993, he became the first boxer to be honored on a postage stamp issued by the U.S. Postal Service.

Various other facilities have been named after Joe Louis. In 1984, the four streets surrounding Madison Square Garden were named Joe Louis Plaza in his honor. The former Pipe O' Peace Golf Course in Riverdale, Illinois (a Chicago suburb), was in 1986 renamed "Joe Louis The Champ Golf Course". American Legion Post 375 in Detroit is also named after Joe Louis. Completed in 1979 at a cost of $4 million, Joe Louis Arena, nicknamed The Joe, was a hockey arena located in downtown Detroit. It was the home of the Detroit Red Wings of the National Hockey League from 1979 until 2017. The planned demolition of the Arena prompted the City of Detroit in 2017 to rename the Inner Circle Greenway as the Joe Louis Greenway. The 39-mile (63 km) biking and walking trail passes through the cities of Detroit, Hamtramck, Highland Park, and Dearborn.

In one of the most widely quoted tributes to Louis, New York Post sportswriter Jimmy Cannon, when responding to another person's characterization of Louis as "a credit to his race", stated, "Yes, Joe Louis is a credit to his race—the human race".

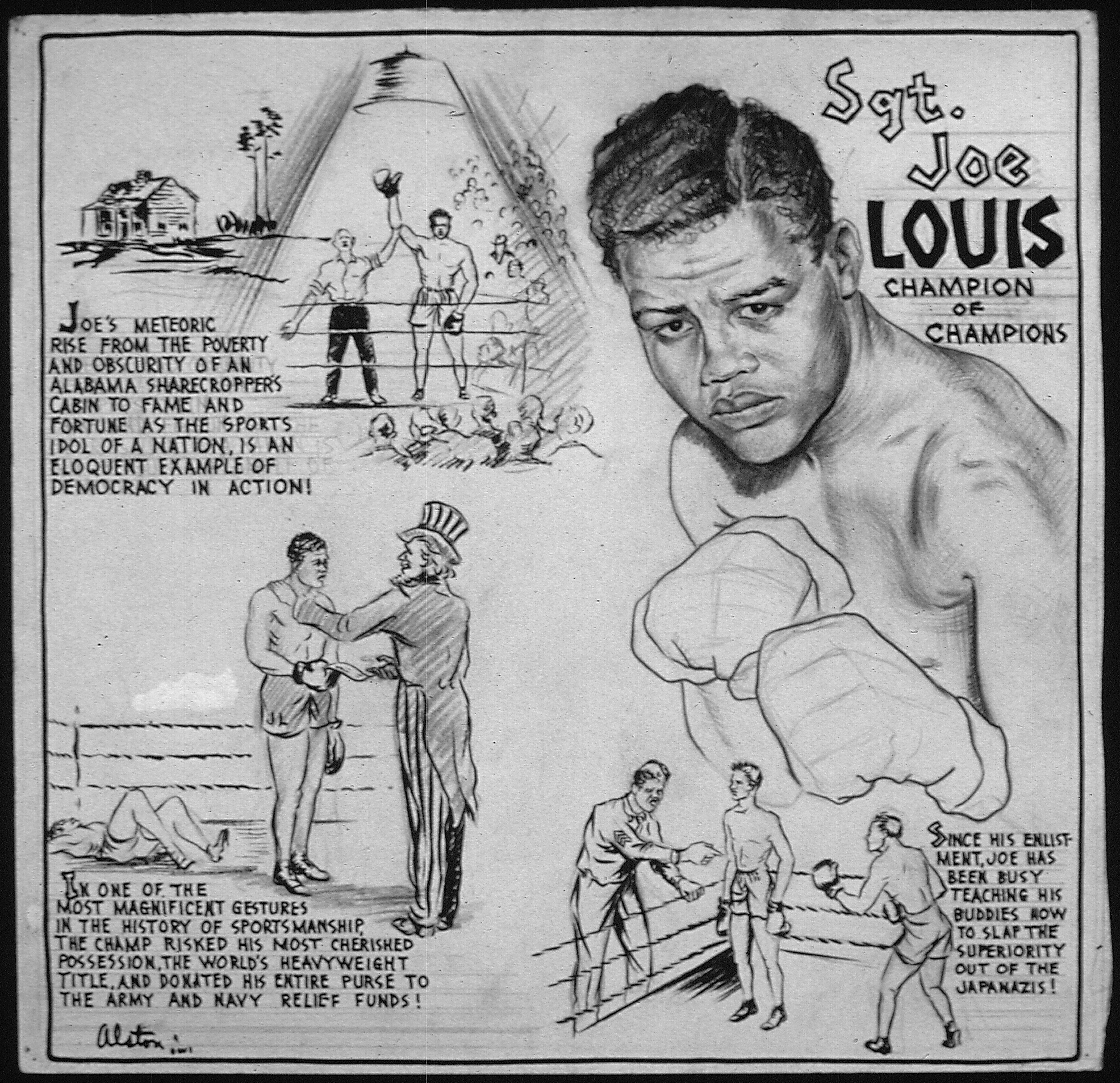
Illustration of Joe Louis by Charles Henry Alston

Joe Louis trained at the site of the Pompton Lakes (NJ) Elks Club. When he won one of his fights, he donated the first ambulance to the Pompton Lakes First Aid Squad.

== Cultural references ==
- In his heyday, Louis was the subject of many musical tributes, including a number of blues songs.
- Kurt Vonnegut's short story "D.P." (originally published in Ladies Home Journal in August 1953) is about a black orphan boy living in post-World War II Germany who is nicknamed "Joe Louis" (after the boxer) by American soldiers stationed in the American Zone of Occupation. "D.P." was included in Vonnegut's short story collection Welcome to the Monkey House (1968) and filmed as "Displaced Person" for television's American Playhouse in 1985.
- Louis was portrayed by actor Bari K. Willerford in the film American Gangster.
- In 2009, the Brooklyn band Yeasayer debuted the single "Ambling Alp" from their forthcoming album Odd Blood, which imagines what advice Joe Louis's father might have given him prior to becoming a prizefighter. The song makes reference to Louis's boxing career and his famous rivalry with Schmeling in the first person, with the lyrics such as "Oh, Max Schmeling was a formidable foe / The Ambling Alp was too, at least that's what I'm told / But if you learn one thing, you've learned it well / In June, you must give fascists hell".
- An opera based on his life, Shadowboxer, premiered on April 17, 2010.
- The aforementioned sculpture of Louis's fist (see Legacy above) was one of several Detroit landmarks depicted in 'Imported from Detroit', a two-minute commercial for the Chrysler 200 featuring Eminem that aired during Super Bowl XLV in 2011.
- Louis is the inspiration behind Jesse Jagz's eponymous song from the album Jagz Nation, Vol. 2: Royal Niger Company (2014).
- The first track from John Squire's 2002 debut LP Time Changes Everything is titled "Joe Louis", and the lyrics include references to his boxing and army career.
- Louis' life is retold in the 1948 old-time radio drama "Little David", a presentation from Destination Freedom.

== Professional boxing record ==
69 fights	66 wins	3 losses
By knockout	52	2
By decision	13	1
By disqualification	1	0

No.	Result	Record	Opponent	Type	Round, time	Date	Age	Location	Notes
69	Loss	66–3	Rocky Marciano	TKO	8 (10)	Oct 26, 1951	37 years, 166 days	Madison Square Garden, New York City, New York, U.S.	
68	Win	66–2	Jimmy Bivins	UD	10	Aug 15, 1951	37 years, 94 days	Memorial Stadium, Baltimore, Maryland, U.S.	
67	Win	65–2	Cesar Brion	UD	10	Aug 1, 1951	37 years, 80 days	Cow Palace, Daly City, California, U.S.	
66	Win	64–2	Lee Savold	KO	6 (15), 2:29	Jun 15, 1951	37 years, 33 days	Madison Square Garden, New York City, New York, U.S.	
65	Win	63–2	Omelio Agramonte	UD	10	May 2, 1951	36 years, 354 days	Olympia, Detroit, Michigan, U.S.	
64	Win	62–2	Andy Walker	TKO	10 (10), 1:49	Feb 23, 1951	36 years, 286 days	Cow Palace, Daly City, California, U.S.	
63	Win	61–2	Omelio Agramonte	UD	10	Feb 7, 1951	36 years, 270 days	Miami Stadium, Miami, Florida, U.S.	
62	Win	60–2	Freddie Beshore	TKO	4 (10), 2:48	Jan 3, 1951	36 years, 235 days	Olympia, Detroit, Michigan, U.S.	
61	Win	59–2	Cesar Brion	UD	10	Nov 29, 1950	36 years, 200 days	Chicago Stadium, Chicago, Illinois, U.S.	
60	Loss	58–2	Ezzard Charles	UD	15	Sep 27, 1950	36 years, 137 days	Yankee Stadium, New York City, New York, U.S.	For NBA, vacant NYSAC, and The Ring heavyweight titles
59	Win	58–1	Jersey Joe Walcott	KO	11 (15)	Jun 25, 1948	34 years, 43 days	Yankee Stadium, New York City, New York, U.S.	Retained NYSAC, NBA, and The Ring heavyweight titles
58	Win	57–1	Jersey Joe Walcott	SD	15	Dec 5, 1947	33 years, 206 days	Madison Square Garden, New York City, New York, U.S.	Retained NYSAC, NBA, and The Ring heavyweight titles
57	Win	56–1	Tami Mauriello	KO	1 (15), 2:09	Sep 18, 1946	32 years, 128 days	Yankee Stadium, New York City, New York, U.S.	Retained NYSAC, NBA, and The Ring heavyweight titles
56	Win	55–1	Billy Conn	KO	8 (15), 2:19	Jun 19, 1946	32 years, 37 days	Yankee Stadium, New York City, New York, U.S.	Retained NYSAC, NBA, and The Ring heavyweight titles
55	Win	54–1	Johnny Davis	TKO	1 (4), 0:53	Nov 14, 1944	30 years, 185 days	Memorial Auditorium, Buffalo, New York, U.S.	Retained NYSAC and The Ring heavyweight titles
54	Win	53–1	Abe Simon	TKO	6 (15), 0:16	Mar 27, 1942	27 years, 318 days	Madison Square Garden, New York City, New York, U.S.	Retained NYSAC, NBA, and The Ring heavyweight titles
53	Win	52–1	Buddy Baer	KO	1 (15), 2:56	Jan 9, 1942	27 years, 241 days	Madison Square Garden, New York City, New York, U.S.	Retained NYSAC, NBA, and The Ring heavyweight titles
52	Win	51–1	Lou Nova	TKO	6 (15), 2:59	Sep 29, 1941	27 years, 139 days	Polo Grounds, New York City, New York, U.S.	Retained NYSAC, NBA, and The Ring heavyweight titles
51	Win	50–1	Billy Conn	KO	13 (15), 2:58	Jun 18, 1941	27 years, 36 days	Polo Grounds, New York City, New York, U.S.	Retained NYSAC, NBA, and The Ring heavyweight titles
50	Win	49–1	Buddy Baer	DQ	7 (15), 3:00	May 23, 1941	27 years, 10 days	Griffith Stadium, Washington, D.C., U.S.	Retained NYSAC, NBA, and The Ring heavyweight titles; Baer disqualified after his manager refused to leave the ring
49	Win	48–1	Tony Musto	TKO	9 (15), 1:36	Apr 8, 1941	26 years, 330 days	St. Louis Arena, St. Louis, Missouri, U.S.	Retained NYSAC, NBA, and The Ring heavyweight titles
48	Win	47–1	Abe Simon	TKO	13 (20), 1:20	Mar 21, 1941	26 years, 312 days	Olympia, Detroit, Michigan, U.S.	Retained NYSAC, NBA, and The Ring heavyweight titles
47	Win	46–1	Gus Dorazio	KO	2 (15), 1:30	Feb 17, 1941	26 years, 280 days	Convention Hall, Philadelphia, Pennsylvania, U.S.	Retained NYSAC, NBA, and The Ring heavyweight titles
46	Win	45–1	Red Burman	KO	5 (15), 2:49	Jan 31, 1941	26 years, 263 days	Madison Square Garden, New York City, New York, U.S.	Retained NYSAC, NBA, and The Ring heavyweight titles
45	Win	44–1	Al McCoy	RTD	5 (15), 3:00	Dec 16, 1940	26 years, 217 days	Boston Garden, Boston, Massachusetts, U.S.	Retained NYSAC, NBA, and The Ring heavyweight titles
44	Win	43–1	Arturo Godoy	TKO	8 (15), 1:24	Jun 20, 1940	26 years, 38 days	Yankee Stadium, New York City, New York, U.S.	Retained NYSAC, NBA, and The Ring heavyweight titles
43	Win	42–1	Johnny Paychek	TKO	2 (15), 0:41	Mar 29, 1940	25 years, 321 days	Madison Square Garden, New York City, New York, U.S.	Retained NYSAC, NBA, and The Ring heavyweight titles
42	Win	41–1	Arturo Godoy	SD	15	Feb 9, 1940	25 years, 272 days	Madison Square Garden, New York City, New York, U.S.	Retained NYSAC, NBA, and The Ring heavyweight titles
41	Win	40–1	Bob Pastor	KO	11 (20), 0:38	Sep 20, 1939	25 years, 130 days	Briggs Stadium, Detroit, Michigan, U.S.	Retained NYSAC, NBA, and The Ring heavyweight titles
40	Win	39–1	Tony Galento	TKO	4 (15), 2:29	Jun 28, 1939	25 years, 46 days	Yankee Stadium, New York City, New York, U.S.	Retained NYSAC, NBA, and The Ring heavyweight titles
39	Win	38–1	Jack Roper	KO	1 (10), 2:20	Apr 17, 1939	24 years, 339 days	Wrigley Field, Los Angeles, California, U.S.	Retained NYSAC, NBA, and The Ring heavyweight titles
38	Win	37–1	John Henry Lewis	KO	1 (15), 2:29	Jan 25, 1939	24 years, 257 days	Madison Square Garden, New York City, New York, U.S.	Retained NYSAC, NBA, and The Ring heavyweight titles
37	Win	36–1	Max Schmeling	TKO	1 (15), 2:04	Jun 22, 1938	24 years, 40 days	Yankee Stadium, New York City, New York, U.S.	Retained NYSAC, NBA, and The Ring heavyweight titles
36	Win	35–1	Harry Thomas	KO	5 (15), 2:50	Apr 4, 1938	23 years, 326 days	Chicago Stadium, Chicago, Illinois, U.S.	Retained NBA and The Ring heavyweight titles
35	Win	34–1	Nathan Mann	KO	3 (15), 1:36	Feb 23, 1938	23 years, 314 days	Madison Square Garden, New York City, New York, U.S.	Retained NYSAC, NBA, and The Ring heavyweight titles
34	Win	33–1	Tommy Farr	UD	15	Aug 30, 1937	23 years, 109 days	Yankee Stadium, New York City, New York, U.S.	Retained NYSAC and The Ring heavyweight titles
33	Win	32–1	James J. Braddock	KO	8 (15)	Jun 22, 1937	23 years, 40 days	Comiskey Park, Chicago, Illinois, U.S.	Won NYSAC, NBA, and The Ring heavyweight titles
32	Win	31–1	Natie Brown	KO	4 (10), 0:52	Feb 17, 1937	22 years, 280 days	Municipal Auditorium, Kansas City, Missouri, U.S.	
31	Win	30–1	Bob Pastor	UD	10	Jan 29, 1937	22 years, 261 days	Madison Square Garden, New York City, New York, U.S.	
30	Win	29–1	Steve Ketchel	KO	2 (4), 0:31	Jan 11, 1937	22 years, 243 days	Broadway Auditorium, Buffalo, New York, U.S.	
29	Win	28–1	Eddie Simms	TKO	1 (10), 0:26	Dec 14, 1936	22 years, 215 days	Public Auditorium, Cleveland, Ohio, U.S.	
28	Win	27–1	Jorge Brescia	KO	3 (10), 2:12	Oct 9, 1936	22 years, 149 days	Hippodrome Theatre, New York City, New York, U.S.	
27	Win	26–1	Al Ettore	KO	5 (15), 1:28	Sep 22, 1936	22 years, 132 days	Municipal Stadium, Philadelphia, Pennsylvania, U.S.	
26	Win	25–1	Jack Sharkey	KO	3 (10), 1:02	Aug 18, 1936	22 years, 97 days	Yankee Stadium, New York City, New York, U.S.	
25	Loss	24–1	Max Schmeling	KO	12 (15), 2:29	Jun 19, 1936	22 years, 37 days	Yankee Stadium, New York City, New York, U.S.	
24	Win	24–0	Charley Retzlaff	KO	1 (15), 1:25	Jan 17, 1936	21 years, 249 days	Chicago Stadium, Chicago, Illinois, U.S.	
23	Win	23–0	Paulino Uzcudun	TKO	4 (15), 2:32	Dec 13, 1935	21 years, 214 days	Madison Square Garden, New York City, New York, U.S.	
22	Win	22–0	Max Baer	KO	4 (15), 3:09	Sep 24, 1935	21 years, 134 days	Yankee Stadium, New York City, New York, U.S.	
21	Win	21–0	King Levinsky	TKO	1 (10), 2:21	Aug 7, 1935	21 years, 86 days	Comiskey Park, Chicago, Illinois, U.S.	
20	Win	20–0	Primo Carnera	TKO	6 (15), 2:32	Jun 25, 1935	21 years, 43 days	Yankee Stadium, New York City, New York, U.S.	
19	Win	19–0	Biff Bennett	KO	1 (6), 1:15	Apr 22, 1935	20 years, 344 days	Memorial Hall, Dayton, Ohio, U.S.	
18	Win	18–0	Roy Lazer	KO	3 (10), 2:28	Apr 12, 1935	20 years, 334 days	Chicago Stadium, Chicago, Illinois, U.S.	
17	Win	17–0	Natie Brown	UD	10	Mar 29, 1935	20 years, 320 days	Olympia, Detroit, Michigan, U.S.	
16	Win	16–0	Don "Red" Barry	TKO	3 (10), 1:30	Mar 8, 1935	20 years, 299 days	New Dreamland Auditorium, San Francisco, California, U.S.	
15	Win	15–0	Lee Ramage	TKO	2 (10), 2:11	Feb 21, 1935	20 years, 284 days	Wrigley Field, Los Angeles, California, U.S.	
14	Win	14–0	Hans Birkie	TKO	10 (10), 1:47	Jan 11, 1935	20 years, 243 days	Duquesne Garden, Pittsburgh, Pennsylvania, U.S.	
13	Win	13–0	Patsy Perroni	PTS	10	Jan 4, 1935	20 years, 236 days	Olympia, Detroit, Michigan, U.S.	
12	Win	12–0	Lee Ramage	TKO	8 (10), 2:51	Dec 14, 1934	20 years, 215 days	Chicago Stadium, Chicago, Illinois, U.S.	
11	Win	11–0	Charley Massera	KO	3 (10), 2:41	Nov 30, 1934	20 years, 201 days	Coliseum, Chicago, Illinois, U.S.	
10	Win	10–0	Stanley Poreda	KO	1 (10), 2:40	Nov 14, 1934	20 years, 185 days	Arcadia Gardens, Chicago, Illinois, U.S.	
9	Win	9–0	Jack O'Dowd	KO	2 (10)	Oct 31, 1934	20 years, 171 days	Arcadia Gardens, Chicago, Illinois, U.S.	
8	Win	8–0	Art Sykes	KO	8 (10)	Oct 24, 1934	20 years, 164 days	Arcadia Gardens, Chicago, Illinois, U.S.	
7	Win	7–0	Adolph Wiater	PTS	10	Sep 26, 1934	20 years, 136 days	Arcadia Gardens, Chicago, Illinois, U.S.	
6	Win	6–0	Al Delaney	TKO	4 (10)	Sep 11, 1934	20 years, 121 days	Naval Armory, Detroit, Michigan, U.S.	
5	Win	5–0	Buck Everett	KO	2 (8)	Aug 27, 1934	20 years, 106 days	Marigold Gardens Outdoor Arena, Chicago, Illinois, U.S.	
4	Win	4–0	Jack Kranz	UD	8	Aug 13, 1934	20 years, 92 days	Marigold Gardens Outdoor Arena, Chicago, Illinois, U.S.	
3	Win	3–0	Larry Udell	TKO	2 (8)	Jul 30, 1934	20 years, 78 days	Marigold Gardens Outdoor Arena, Chicago, Illinois, U.S.	
2	Win	2–0	Willie Davies	TKO	3 (6)	Jul 12, 1934	20 years, 60 days	Bacon's Arena, Chicago, Illinois, U.S.	
1	Win	1–0	Jack Kracken	KO	1 (6)	Jul 4, 1934	20 years, 55 days	Bacon's Arena, Chicago, Illinois, U.S.	

== Titles in boxing ==
=== Major world titles ===
- NYSAC heavyweight champion (200+ lbs)
- NBA (WBA) heavyweight champion (200+ lbs)

=== The Ring magazine titles ===
- The Ring heavyweight champion (200+ lbs)

=== Lineal titles ===
- Lineal heavyweight champion

=== Undisputed titles ===
- Undisputed heavyweight champion

== See also ==
- List of world heavyweight boxing champions
- List of people from Harlem

== Citations ==
Sporting positions
Amateur boxing titles
Preceded by Max Marek	Chicago Golden Gloves Tournament of Champions light heavyweight champion 1934	Succeeded by Joe Bauer
Preceded by Max Marek	National AAU Boxing Championships light heavyweight champion 1934	Succeeded by Joe Bauer
Major world boxing titles
Preceded by James J. Braddock	NYSAC heavyweight champion June 22, 1937 – March 1, 1949; Retired	Vacant Title next held by Ezzard Charles
Preceded by James J. Braddock	NBA heavyweight champion June 22, 1937 – March 1, 1949; Retired	Vacant Title next held by Ezzard Charles
Preceded by James J. Braddock	The Ring heavyweight champion June 22, 1937 – March 1, 1949; Retired	Vacant Title next held by Ezzard Charles
Preceded by James J. Braddock	Undisputed heavyweight champion June 22, 1937 – March 1, 1949; Retired	Vacant Title next held by Ezzard Charles
Records
Preceded by Jack Dempsey	Youngest Heavyweight Champion; June 22, 1937 – November 30, 1956	Succeeded by Floyd Patterson
Preceded by Tommy Burns; 11	Most opponents beaten for the world heavyweight championship 22; 12th opponent beaten on December 16, 1940; 5 December 1947 – 25 April 2015	Succeeded by Wladimir Klitschko
Preceded by Tommy Burns; 13	Most wins in world heavyweight championship fights 27; 14th win on January 31, 1941; June 25, 1948 – present	Succeeded by Incumbent
Preceded by Jack Dempsey; 2 638 days	Longest cumulative world heavyweight championship reign 4 270 days (11 years, 8 months, 8 days); 2 639 days on September 12, 1944; 1 March 1949 – 14 August 2015	Succeeded by Wladimir Klitschko
Preceded by Jack Dempsey; 7 years, 2 months, 19 days	Longest individual world heavyweight championship reign 11 years, 8 months, 8 days 7 years, 2 months, 20 days on September 12, 1944; March 1, 1949 – present	Succeeded by Incumbent
