= Johnny Paychek =

American boxer (1914–1988)

Personal information
- Nickname: Corn Belt's Pride
- Born: John J. Pacek; June 11, 1914 Chicago, Illinois, U.S.
- Died: December 3, 1988 (aged 74) Western Springs, Illinois, U.S.
- Height: 6 ft 0.5 in (184 cm)
- Weight: Heavyweight

Boxing career
- Reach: 75 in (191 cm)
- Stance: Orthodox

Boxing record
- Wins: 38
- Win by KO: 28
- Losses: 6
- Draws: 2

John J. Pacek (June 11, 1914 – December 3, 1988), better known by the ring name Johnny Paychek, was an American boxer. Though considered a journeyman, he did face Joe Louis in 1940 for the lineal heavyweight title. Louis beat him by a second-round knockout, in what turned out to be Paychek's only world championship try as a professional boxer.

After retiring from the ring, Paychek married and had two children. A longtime resident of Lyons, Illinois, Paychek died on December 3, 1988, at La Grange Memorial Hospital in Western Springs,Illinois.

Country singer Johnny Paycheck took his stage name as a tribute or reference to Paychek.
