= Robert Graham (sculptor) =

American sculptor

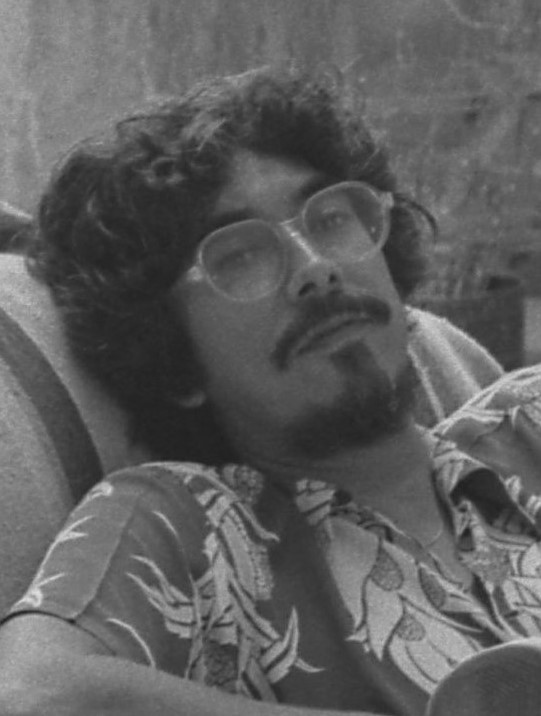
- Graham in 1976
- Born: August 19, 1938; Mexico City, Mexico
- Died: December 27, 2008 (aged 70); Santa Monica, California, U.S.
- Education: San Jose State College; San Francisco Art Institute
- Known for: Sculpture
- Notable work: Olympic Gateway – Memorial Coliseum, Los Angeles, California (1984); Joe Louis Memorial – Detroit, Michigan (1986)
- Spouse(s): Joey Graham (m. 1959; div. 19??); Anne Kresl (m. 19??; div. 19??) Anjelica Huston (m. 1992)
- Children: 1
- Website: www.robertgraham-artist.com

Robert Graham (August 19, 1938 – December 27, 2008) was a Mexican-born American sculptor based in the state of California in the United States. His monumental bronzes commemorate the human figure, and are featured in public places across America.

== Early life and education ==
Graham was born in Mexico City, Mexico, on August 19, 1938, to Roberto Pena and Adelina Graham. Roberto Pena died when his son was six years old, and the boy, his mother Adelina, his grandmother Ana, and his aunt Mercedes left Mexico and moved to San Jose, California.

Robert Graham received his formal art training at San José State University and the San Francisco Art Institute. He continued his studies at the San Francisco Art Institute in California, finishing in 1964.

== Career ==
By the late 1960s, Graham had one-man exhibitions of his sculpture at important contemporary art galleries in Palo Alto, Los Angeles, New York City, London, Cologne, and Essen, Germany. He, along with family members Joey and Steven, lived in London for a period before settling in Los Angeles in the early 1970s. His first solo exhibition in a museum was at the Dallas Museum of Art in 1972. Since then he has had dozens of one-man shows, including several at the Los Angeles County Museum of Art.

Graham used a range of materials and scales in his work. In the 1970s he created very small wax sculptures (circa 4 inches (10 cm)) in miniature dioramas, depicting people interacting in various contemporary environments, such as a living room or a beach scene. Some of these interactions included sexual congress. Graham's 1986 monument to the boxer Joe Louis is a 24-foot (7.3 m) bronze fist and forearm. He has created hundreds of nude figures and groupings in intermediate scales.

Graham's first major monumental commission was the ceremonial gateway for the Los Angeles Memorial Coliseum, for the occasion of the 1984 Olympics. He also designed the commemorative silver dollar for the event. The gateway featured two bronze torsos, male and female, modeled on contestants in the games. The gateway was a major design element of an Olympiad noted for its lack of new construction. To the surprise of many, the nudity of the torsos became an issue in the media.

After 1984, Graham received many other commissions for monumental works, such as The Great Bronze Doors of the Cathedral of Our Lady of the Angels in Los Angeles (2002).

== Personal life ==
Graham married his first wife Joey Graham in 1959. They have one son, Steven, born in 1963.

He married actress Anjelica Huston in 1992, and they resided in an unusual dwelling in Venice, Los Angeles. Huston refused to move to the bohemian area, where he'd been living for years, unless Graham designed a custom home that balanced security with beauty. The result was a remarkable home behind a long, solid cement wall to separate them from the well-traveled sidewalks: it was nicknamed the fortress.

Graham made a cameo appearance in Huston's movie, The Life Aquatic with Steve Zissou, as the Venezuelan general near the beginning of the film standing on the deck of the ship. Wes Anderson mentions in the movie's commentary that Graham has some aspects in common with Steve Zissou.

He was interviewed in Visiting... with Huell Howser Episode 411.

== Honors ==
In 1983, Graham was elected into the National Academy of Design as an Associate member, and became a full Academician in 1994.

California Governor Arnold Schwarzenegger and First Lady Maria Shriver announced on May 28, 2008, that Graham would be inducted into the California Hall of Fame, located at The California Museum for History, Women and the Arts. The induction ceremony took place on December 15, 2008, but he was too ill to attend. His son Steven accepted the award on his behalf as he was inducted alongside 11 other legendary Californians.

== Death ==
After an illness of about six months, Graham died on December 27, 2008, at Santa Monica – UCLA Medical Center, in Los Angeles. His funeral was held at Cathedral of Our Lady of the Angels, which has bronze doors that Graham created for the cathedral. His remains are interred at Woodlawn Cemetery, Mortuary & Mausoleum.

== Works ==
- 1978: Dance Door – Los Angeles Music Center, Los Angeles, California
- 1980–81: Stephanie and Spy – Hammer Museum, University of California, Los Angeles Campus, Los Angeles, California
- 1983: Fountain Figure No. 1, Fountain Figure No. 2, and Fountain Figure No. 3, Museum of Fine Arts, Houston
- 1984: Olympic Gateway – Memorial Coliseum, Los Angeles, California
- 1986: Joe Louis Memorial, Detroit, Michigan
- 1988: Gates of the Honolulu Museum of Art Spalding House (formerly known as The Contemporary Museum, Honolulu)
- 1994: Plumed Serpent, Plaza de César Chávez, San Jose, California
- 1997: First Inaugural and Social Programs, Franklin Delano Roosevelt Memorial, Washington, DC
- 1997: Duke Ellington Monument – Central Park, New York City
- 1999: Charlie "Bird" Parker Memorial, Kansas City, Missouri
- 2001: Prologue – addition to the FDR Memorial, Washington, DC
- 2002: The Great Bronze Doors and Statue of Mary – Cathedral of Our Lady of the Angels, Los Angeles, California
- 2003: Torso – Rodeo Drive Walk of Style, Beverly Hills, California
- 2003: Deus Ex: Invisible War (videogame), the voice of Saman
- 2007: Spirit of California – California Hall of Fame Medal
Fountain Figures No. 1, 2, 3 (1983), Museum of Fine Arts, Houston

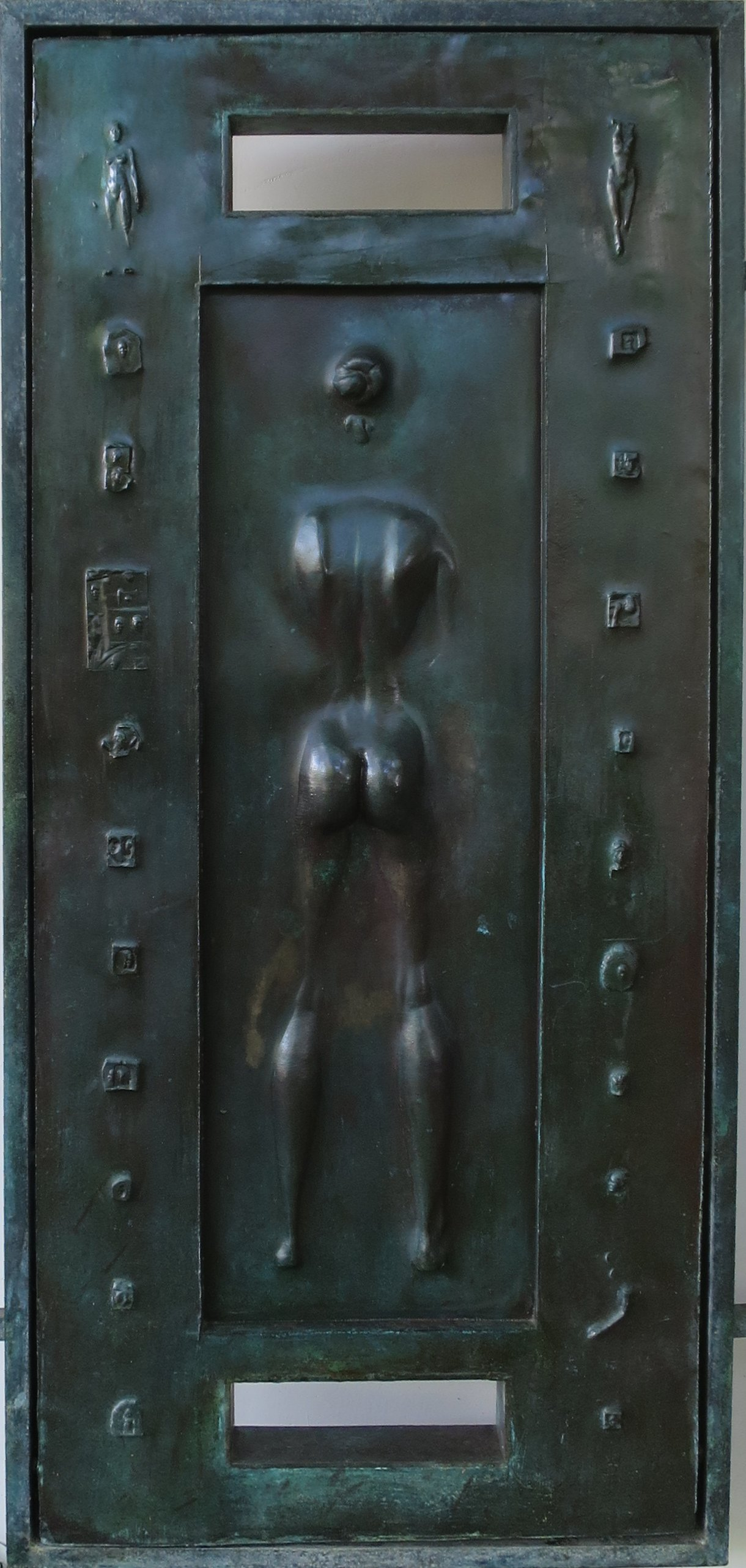
Door of Spalding House, the Honolulu Museum of Art (1988)

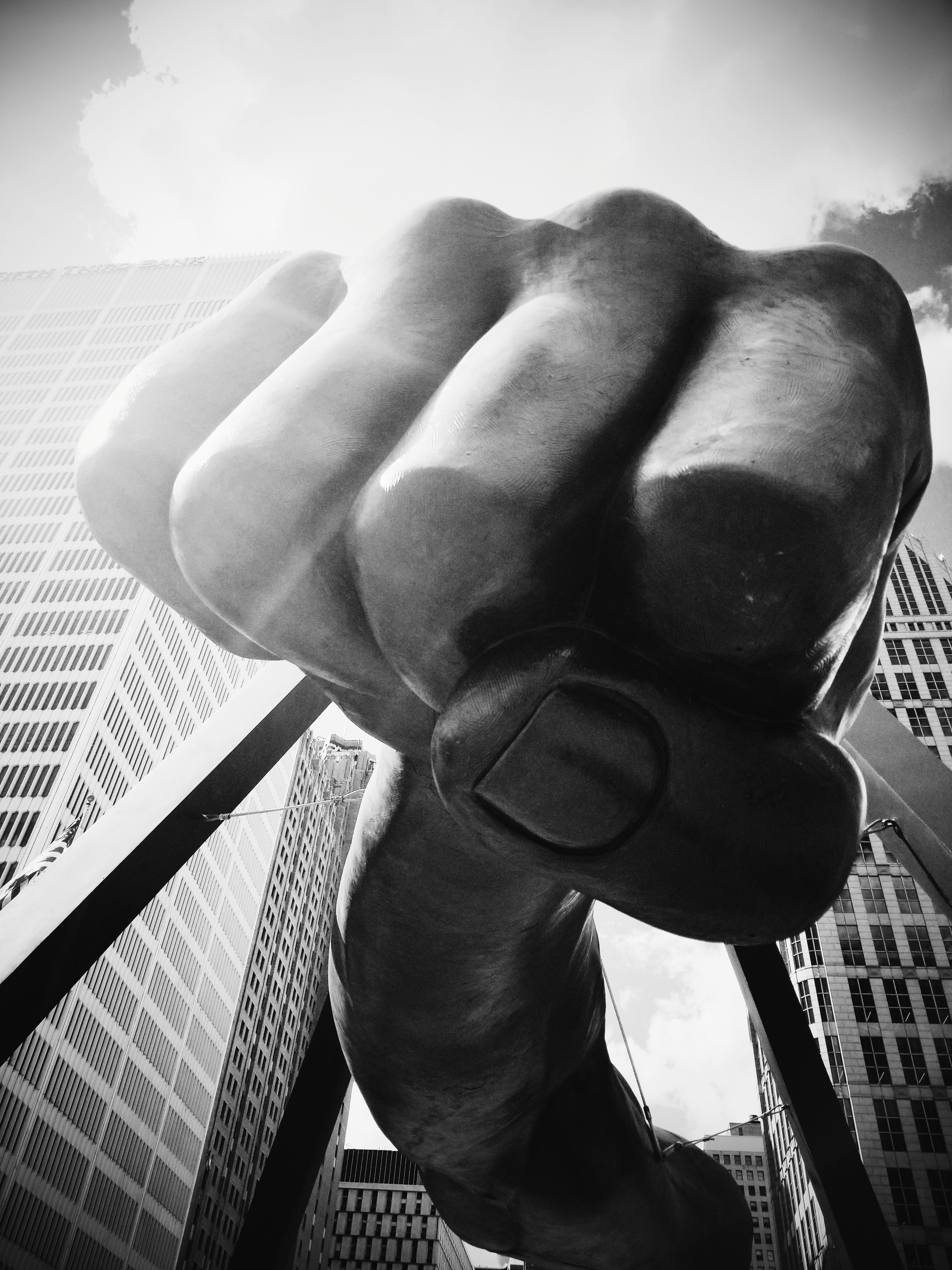
Monument to Joe Louis also known as The Fist (1986)

Nude sculptures at Los Angeles Memorial Coliseum
