= Joe Louis Greenway =

Trail in Michigan

Coordinates: 42°21′31″N 83°08′52″W

The Joe Louis Greenway is a 27.5-mile (44 km) urban greenway in Detroit, Michigan, designed to connect neighborhoods, parks, commercial corridors, and public spaces. Named after heavyweight boxing champion Joe Louis, a Detroit native, the Greenway is intended to support walking, biking, transit use, and other non-motorized forms of transportation while promoting equity, economic development, and environmental sustainability.

== Overview ==
The Joe Louis Greenway is a multi-use path that will link more than 23 Detroit neighborhoods with nearby cities including Hamtramck, Highland Park, and Dearborn. It connects to existing trails like the Dequindre Cut, Detroit Riverwalk, and Southwest Greenway, creating a continuous loop that spans the city.

When completed, the Greenway will provide access to recreational spaces, employment centers, schools, and transit systems, while addressing long-standing disinvestment in parts of Detroit, particularly in historically underserved Black and working-class communities.

== History ==
=== Origins ===
The concept for a citywide greenway began in the early 2000s as part of Detroit’s broader push to revitalize public spaces and non-motorized transportation infrastructure. The idea gained momentum with support from local advocacy groups and urban planners.

=== Naming and Expansion ===
In 2017, the trail was officially renamed the Joe Louis Greenway to honor the iconic boxer and symbolize unity and resilience. Joe Louis, known as the “Brown Bomber,” was a celebrated figure not just in sports but also in the civil rights movement.

The city acquired a key 7.5-mile abandoned Conrail railroad corridor in 2019, paving the way for major construction. The Greenway's design includes stormwater infrastructure, public art, lighting, and safety features.

== Development and construction ==
The project is being developed in phases:

- Phase 1 began construction in 2021, focusing on the northeast segment between McNichols Road and Warren Avenue.
- Phase 2 will extend westward through Highland Park and beyond.
- Full completion is expected by the early 2030s, depending on funding and logistics.

The Greenway is being built using a mix of public funds (local, state, and federal), private donations, and philanthropic support.
