= King Levinsky =

American boxer (1910–1991)

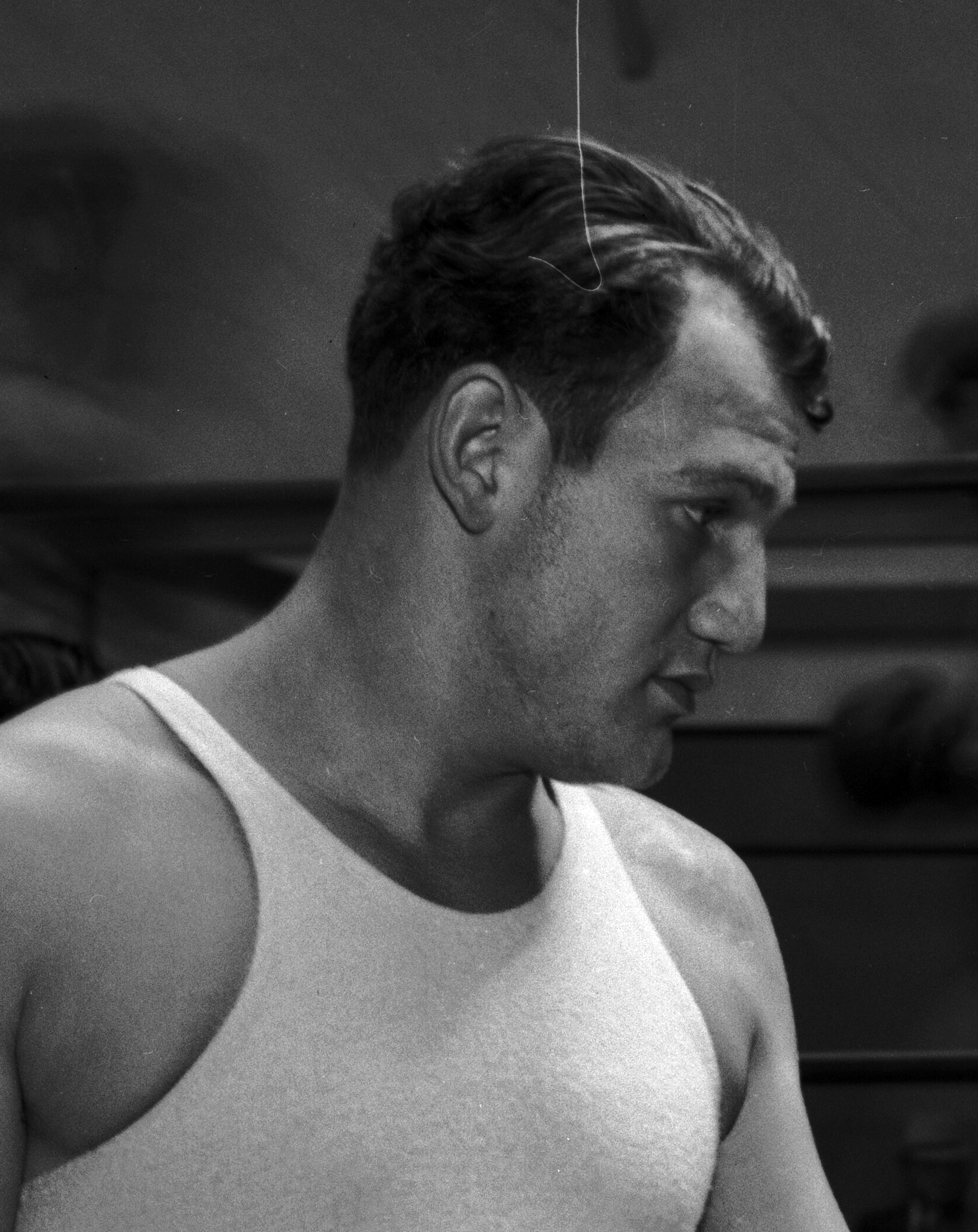
- Levinsky in 1934

Personal information
- Nickname: Kingfish Levinsky
- Born: Harris Krakow; September 10, 1910 Chicago, Illinois, U.S.
- Died: September 30, 1991 (aged 81)
- Height: 5 ft 11 in (180 cm)
- Weight: Heavyweight

Boxing career
- Reach: 74 in (188 cm)
- Stance: Orthodox

Boxing record
- Total fights: 116
- Wins: 74
- Win by KO: 40
- Losses: 35
- Draws: 7

King Levinsky (10 September 1910 – 30 September 1991), also known as Kingfish Levinsky, was an American heavyweight boxer who fought during the 1930s. Ranked in the top 10 heavyweights every year from 1931-1934 by The Ring, peaking at 3rd in 1933. He was born as Harris Kraków and was a member of the Kraków fish-selling family of Maxwell Street, in Chicago's old Jewish ghetto.

== Professional career ==
=== Notable opposition ===
Levinsky was a rated heavyweight whose biggest wins came against ex-heavyweight champion Jack Sharkey on a 10-round decision, and ex-lightheavyweight champion Tommy Loughran, also on a decision. He was defeated twice by Primo Carnera, and also lost to Max Baer. Although he never fought for the title, Levinsky faced all of the top fighters of his era.

Levinsky is best remembered for "freezing" in his fight with Joe Louis, who knocked him out in the first round. On February 18, 1931, Levinsky also fought a 4-round exhibition with Jack Dempsey. Dempsey had embarked on a tour of exhibition bouts and was contemplating a comeback. The Levinsky fight convinced him that he was through as a fighter.

On November 19, 1935 Levinsky lost to professional wrestler Ray Steele in a boxer versus wrestler match in St. Louis, Missouri.

=== Marketability ===
A May 1932 Time Magazine article stated: "If you defined the efficiency of a prize-fighter by his ability in the ring, Harry Krakow ('Kingfish Levinsky') would not rate better than tenth among U. S. heavyweights. Last year he had 15 fights, won only eight. If you defined efficiency as a fighter's ability to earn money at his trade, Kingfish Levinsky might rank as best fighter in the U. S. In the last 15 months, gates at his fights with Slattery, Griffiths, Carnera, Paulino and an exhibition bout against Jack Dempsey have amounted to $254,124.68. He may this year earn more than Schmeling, Sharkey, Dempsey, Carnera or Schaaf. Kingfish Levinsky's earning power is due partly to an engaging slapstick manner in the ring, an engaging entourage.... It is due partly to the fact that most of Levinsky's fights have been in Chicago, where everyone knows that he grew up on the West Side and entered the fish-peddling business with a pushcart on Maxwell Street."

For a portion of his career, Levinsky was managed by his sister Lena (Kraków) Levy. Known as "Leapin Lena", she was a colorful character who swore like a sailor, and rooted loudly for her brother during his bouts. Esquire magazine, in its February 1939 issue, included an article profiling his new career as a professional wrestler.

His ring name was a combination of Battling Levinsky, a fighter he admired, and the "Kingfish" character from Amos 'n' Andy.

=== Life after boxing ===
Levinsky served in the US Army during World War II. In his later years he worked as a tie salesman in Miami Beach, Florida. He was married to fan dancer Roxana Sand for just over a month in 1934. In 1935, Levinsky became a professional wrestler as Kingfish Levinsky working in the States and Canada until retiring in 1946.

== Professional boxing record ==
All information in this section is derived from BoxRec, unless otherwise stated.

=== Official record ===
118 fights	74 wins	35 losses
By knockout	40	5
By decision	34	28
By disqualification	0	2
Draws	7	
Newspaper decisions/draws	2	

All newspaper decisions are officially regarded as “no decision” bouts and are not counted in the win/loss/draw column.

No.	Result	Record	Opponent	Type	Round, time	Date	Location	Notes
118	Loss	74–35–7 (2)	Frankie Edgren	KO	3 (10)	Jul 11, 1939	Hodges Field, Memphis, Tennessee, US	
117	Loss	74–34–7 (2)	Jay D. Turner	PTS	10	Jun 2, 1939	Dallas, Texas, US	
116	Loss	74–33–7 (2)	Babe Ritchie	KO	3 (10), 1:04	May 31, 1939	Softball Park, Lubbock, Texas, US	
115	Loss	74–32–7 (2)	Johnny Paychek	TKO	3 (8)	Jul 11, 1938	Riverview Park, Des Moines, Iowa, US	
114	Win	74–31–7 (2)	Jack Conley	KO	2 (10)	Oct 7, 1937	Dubuque, Iowa, US	
113	Loss	73–31–7 (2)	Jack Doyle	PTS	12	Apr 27, 1937	Empire Pool, Wembley, England	
112	Loss	73–30–7 (2)	Bob Nestell	PTS	10 (10), 2:43	Feb 9, 1937	Olympic Auditorium, Los Angeles, California, US	
111	Loss	73–29–7 (2)	Maxie Rosenbloom	PTS	10	Jan 5, 1937	Olympic Auditorium, Los Angeles, California, US	
110	Win	73–28–7 (2)	Babe Hunt	TKO	6 (10), 0:25	Dec 1, 1936	Olympic Auditorium, Los Angeles, California, US	
109	Draw	72–28–7 (2)	Nash Garrison	PTS	10	Nov 10, 1936	Civic Auditorium, San Jose, California, US	
108	Win	72–28–6 (2)	Leo Lomski	PTS	10	Sep 22, 1936	Auditorium, Portland, Oregon, US	
107	Loss	71–28–6 (2)	Marty Gallagher	UD	10	Sep 1, 1936	Griffith Stadium, Washington, District of Columbia, US	
106	Win	71–27–6 (2)	Big Boy Brackey	PTS	10	Jul 20, 1936	Offermann Stadium, Buffalo, New York, US	
105	Loss	70–27–6 (2)	Lee Ramage	PTS	10	Jul 7, 1936	Olympic Auditorium, Los Angeles, California, US	
104	Win	70–26–6 (2)	Joe Bauer	PTS	10	Jun 26, 1936	Legion Stadium, Hollywood, California, US	
103	Win	69–26–6 (2)	Harold Murphy	PTS	10	Jun 5, 1936	Coliseum, San Diego, California, US	
102	Win	68–26–6 (2)	Pepe Del Rio	TKO	2 (10), 1:38	May 26, 1936	Olympic Auditorium, Los Angeles, California, US	
101	Draw	67–26–6 (2)	Lee Ramage	PTS	10	Apr 7, 1936	Olympic Auditorium, Los Angeles, California, US	
100	Loss	67–26–5 (2)	Phil Brubaker	PTS	10	Feb 14, 1936	Dreamland Auditorium, San Francisco, California, US	
99	Win	67–25–5 (2)	Alfred Rogers	KO	4 (10)	Jan 27, 1936	Auditorium, Oakland, California, US	
98	Win	66–25–5 (2)	Hank Hankinson	PTS	10	Jan 14, 1936	Olympic Auditorium, Los Angeles, California, US	
97	Loss	65–25–5 (2)	Marty Gallagher	PTS	10	Oct 9, 1935	Griffith Stadium, Washington, District of Columbia, US	
96	Loss	65–24–5 (2)	Joe Louis	TKO	1 (10), 2:21	Aug 7, 1935	Comiskey Park, Chicago, Illinois, US	
95	Win	65–23–5 (2)	Tom Jones	PTS	4	Jun 10, 1935	Peoria, Illinois, US	
94	Win	64–23–5 (2)	Jack Slade	KO	2 (10), 0:41	Jun 7, 1935	Municipal Stadium, Davenport, Iowa, US	
93	Win	63–23–5 (2)	Hans Birkie	PTS	10	May 27, 1935	Maple Leaf Gardens, Toronto, Ontario, Canada	
92	Win	62–23–5 (2)	Hans Birkie	KO	4 (?), 2:54	Apr 15, 1935	City Auditorium, Denver, Colorado, US	
91	Win	61–23–5 (2)	Bob Williams	KO	1 (?), 2:54	Apr 4, 1935	Tulsa, Oklahoma, US	
90	Win	60–23–5 (2)	Joe Rice	KO	2 (10)	Apr 1, 1935	Oklahoma City, Oklahoma, US	
89	Win	59–23–5 (2)	Babe Hunt	PTS	10	Mar 27, 1935	Fair Park Live Stock Arena, Dallas, Texas, US	
88	Win	58–23–5 (2)	Salvatore Ruggirello	TKO	2 (10)	Mar 4, 1935	Benjamin Field Arena, Tampa, Florida, US	
87	Win	57–23–5 (2)	Jack Townsend	KO	2 (?)	Feb 21, 1935	Daytona Beach, Florida, US	
86	Win	56–23–5 (2)	Jack Townsend	KO	2 (?)	Feb 19, 1935	Jacksonville, Florida, US	
85	Win	55–23–5 (2)	Ted DeMarino	KO	2 (10)	Feb 14, 1935	Dixie Theatre, West Palm Beach, Florida, US	
84	Win	54–23–5 (2)	Eddie Civil	TKO	2 (10)	Feb 11, 1935	Benjamin Field Arena, Tampa, Florida, US	
83	Win	53–23–5 (2)	Merrill 'Red' Tonn	KO	6 (10)	Feb 4, 1935	Legion Coliseum, Sarasota, Florida, US	
82	Draw	52–23–5 (2)	Art Lasky	PTS	10	Nov 23, 1934	Chicago Stadium, Chicago, Illinois, US	
81	Win	52–23–4 (2)	Salvatore Ruggirello	KO	3 (10)	Sep 28, 1934	Auditorium, Milwaukee, Wisconsin, US	
80	Win	51–23–4 (2)	Art Sykes	PTS	10	Sep 20, 1934	Wrigley Field, Chicago, Illinois, US	
79	Loss	50–23–4 (2)	Art Lasky	UD	10	Jun 12, 1934	Olympic Auditorium, Los Angeles, California, US	
78	Win	50–22–4 (2)	Lee Ramage	PTS	10	Apr 17, 1934	Olympic Auditorium, Los Angeles, California, US	
77	Loss	49–22–4 (2)	Walter Neusel	MD	10	Mar 9, 1934	Madison Square Garden, New York City, New York, US	
76	Win	49–21–4 (2)	Charley Massera	SD	10	Feb 9, 1934	Madison Square Garden, New York City, New York, US	
75	Win	48–21–4 (2)	Don McCorkindale	PTS	10	Dec 29, 1933	Chicago Stadium, Chicago, Illinois, US	
74	Win	47–21–4 (2)	Jack Sharkey	UD	10	Sep 18, 1933	Comiskey Park, Chicago, Illinois, US	
73	Win	46–21–4 (2)	Tuffy Griffiths	UD	10	Jun 2, 1933	Mills Stadium, Chicago, Illinois, US	
72	Win	45–21–4 (2)	Charley Retzlaff	KO	1 (10), 2:15	May 3, 1933	Chicago Stadium, Chicago, Illinois, US	
71	Loss	44–21–4 (2)	Johnny Risko	PTS	10	Feb 24, 1933	Madison Square Garden, New York City, New York, US	
70	Win	44–20–4 (2)	Unknown Winston	PTS	10	Feb 2, 1933	Convention Hall, Philadelphia, Pennsylvania, US	
69	Win	43–20–4 (2)	Meyer K.O. Christner	TKO	5 (?)	Jan 23, 1933	St. Nicholas Arena, New York City, New York, US	
68	Loss	42–20–4 (2)	Tommy Loughran	UD	10	Jan 10, 1933	Convention Hall, Philadelphia, Pennsylvania, US	
67	Loss	42–19–4 (2)	Primo Carnera	SD	10	Dec 9, 1932	Chicago Stadium, Chicago, Illinois, US	
66	Loss	42–18–4 (2)	Joe Sekyra	NWS	10	Oct 13, 1932	Auditorium, Minneapolis, Minnesota, US	
65	Win	42–18–4 (1)	Angus Snyder	TKO	3 (10)	Sep 22, 1932	City Auditorium, Omaha, Nebraska, US	
64	Loss	41–18–4 (1)	Johnny Risko	PTS	12	Sep 1, 1932	Municipal Stadium, Cleveland, Ohio, US	
63	Loss	41–17–4 (1)	Max Baer	PTS	20	Jul 4, 1932	Dempsey's Bowl, Reno, Nevada, US	
62	Loss	41–16–4 (1)	Mickey Walker	SD	10	Apr 29, 1932	Chicago Stadium, Chicago, Illinois, US	
61	Loss	41–15–4 (1)	Max Baer	UD	10	Jan 29, 1932	Madison Square Garden, New York City, New York, US	
60	Win	41–14–4 (1)	Paulino Uzcudun	MD	10	Jan 15, 1932	Chicago Stadium, Chicago, Illinois, US	
59	Win	40–14–4 (1)	Tommy Loughran	UD	10	Dec 18, 1931	Madison Square Garden, New York City, New York, US	
58	Loss	39–14–4 (1)	Primo Carnera	UD	10	Nov 19, 1931	Chicago Stadium, Chicago, Illinois, US	
57	Win	39–13–4 (1)	Jimmy Slattery	PTS	10	Oct 30, 1931	Olympia Stadium, Detroit, Michigan, US	
56	Win	38–13–4 (1)	Joe Sekyra	MD	10	Sep 30, 1931	Coliseum, Chicago, Illinois, US	
55	Draw	37–13–4 (1)	Young Con O'Kelly	SD	10	Sep 9, 1931	White City Arena, Chicago, Illinois, US	
54	Loss	37–13–3 (1)	Ace Hudkins	PTS	10	Jul 1, 1931	Mills Stadium, Chicago, Illinois, US	
53	Win	37–12–3 (1)	Pat McCarthy	TKO	4 (10)	Jun 9, 1931	Kanawha Park, Charleston, West Virginia, US	
52	Win	36–12–3 (1)	Emmett Rocco	PTS	10	May 8, 1931	Chicago Stadium, Chicago, Illinois, US	
51	Loss	35–12–3 (1)	Emmett Rocco	PTS	10	Apr 27, 1931	Motor Square Garden, Pittsburgh, Pennsylvania, US	
50	Loss	35–11–3 (1)	Johnny Risko	PTS	10	Apr 21, 1931	Arena, Boston, Massachusetts, US	
49	Win	35–10–3 (1)	Young Con O'Kelly	UD	10	Mar 31, 1931	Arena, Boston, Massachusetts, US	
48	Loss	34–10–3 (1)	Tuffy Griffiths	PTS	10	Mar 6, 1931	Chicago Stadium, Chicago, Illinois, US	
47	Win	34–9–3 (1)	Jack Gagnon	KO	3 (10)	Feb 6, 1931	Boston Garden, Boston, Massachusetts, US	
46	Win	33–9–3 (1)	Harry Dillon	KO	2 (?)	Jan 30, 1931	Riverview Rink, Milwaukee, Wisconsin, US	
45	Loss	32–9–3 (1)	Jimmy Slattery	PTS	10	Jan 14, 1931	Chicago Stadium, Chicago, Illinois, US	
44	Loss	32–8–3 (1)	Tommy Loughran	UD	10	Nov 21, 1930	Chicago Stadium, Chicago, Illinois, US	
43	Win	32–7–3 (1)	Jimmy Slattery	SD	10	Nov 6, 1930	Chicago Stadium, Chicago, Illinois, US	
42	Win	31–7–3 (1)	Tom Kirby	KO	2 (10)	Oct 14, 1930	Chicago Stadium, Chicago, Illinois, US	
41	Win	30–7–3 (1)	Leo Lomski	KO	5 (10)	Sep 11, 1930	Chicago Stadium, Chicago, Illinois, US	
40	Win	29–7–3 (1)	Jack Kracken	TKO	6 (10)	Aug 29, 1930	Jones & Baumrucker Park, Chicago, Illinois, US	
39	Win	28–7–3 (1)	Len Darcy	PTS	10	Aug 16, 1930	North Shore Arena, South Haven, Michigan, US	
38	Win	27–7–3 (1)	Bud Doran	PTS	10	Aug 1, 1930	Jones & Baumrucker Park, Chicago, Illinois, US	
37	Win	26–7–3 (1)	Jimmy Mahoney	KO	4 (10)	Jul 18, 1930	Jones & Baumrucker Park, Chicago, Illinois, US	
36	Win	25–7–3 (1)	K.O. White	PTS	10	Jul 11, 1930	Jones & Baumrucker Park, Chicago, Illinois, US	
35	Loss	24–7–3 (1)	Paul Pantaleo	PTS	10	Jun 20, 1930	Blue Mound Race Track, Milwaukee, Wisconsin, US	
34	Win	24–6–3 (1)	Mitz Minikel	KO	1 (10)	May 28, 1930	Auditorium, Milwaukee, Wisconsin, US	
33	Win	23–6–3 (1)	Al Keegan	TKO	1 (4)	Apr 30, 1930	Chicago Stadium, Chicago, Illinois, US	
32	Loss	22–6–3 (1)	Mitz Minikel	PTS	10	Apr 21, 1930	Auditorium, Milwaukee, Wisconsin, US	
31	Win	22–5–3 (1)	Dave Maier	TKO	1 (10)	Apr 3, 1930	Auditorium, Milwaukee, Wisconsin, US	
30	Loss	21–5–3 (1)	Paul Swiderski	PTS	8	Mar 24, 1930	White City Arena, Chicago, Illinois, US	
29	Win	21–4–3 (1)	Leon Lucas	KO	6 (?)	Mar 8, 1930	Auditorium, Milwaukee, Wisconsin, US	
28	Loss	20–4–3 (1)	Al Stillman	NWS	5	Feb 11, 1930	Arena, Saint Louis, Missouri, US	
27	Win	20–4–3	Chick Rife	TKO	1 (4)	Feb 7, 1930	Coliseum, Chicago, Illinois, US	
26	Win	19–4–3	Jack Barry	PTS	6	Jan 31, 1930	Chicago Stadium, Chicago, Illinois, US	
25	Win	18–4–3	Johnny Freeman	PTS	8	Jan 23, 1930	Rainbo Fronton, Chicago, Illinois, US	
24	Win	17–4–3	Tom Jones	PTS	8	Dec 26, 1929	Ashland Blvd. Auditorium, Chicago, Illinois, US	
23	Loss	16–4–3	Ted Ross	DQ	6 (10)	Nov 18, 1929	White City Arena, Chicago, Illinois, US	Levinsky DQ'd for butting, thumbing, and elbowing
22	Win	16–3–3	Russell Buelick	KO	4 (6)	Oct 29, 1929	Guyon's Paradise Ballroom, Chicago, Illinois, US	
21	Win	15–3–3	Russell Buelick	KO	1 (6)	Oct 22, 1929	Guyon's Paradise Ballroom, Chicago, Illinois, US	
20	Win	14–3–3	Nick Taft	TKO	3 (5)	Oct 16, 1929	Chicago Stadium, Chicago, Illinois, US	
19	Win	13–3–3	Tommy O'Brien	UD	10	Aug 12, 1929	Logan Square Baseball Park, Chicago, Illinois, US	
18	Win	12–3–3	Johnny Sherrod	PTS	6	Jul 9, 1929	Logan Square Baseball Park, Chicago, Illinois, US	
17	Win	11–3–3	Frankie Ryan	KO	1 (4)	Jul 4, 1929	Mills Stadium, Chicago, Illinois, US	
16	Win	10–3–3	Joe Corrado	KO	4 (6)	Jun 24, 1929	Logan Square Baseball Park, Chicago, Illinois, US	
15	Draw	9–3–3	Joe Corrado	PTS	4	Jun 10, 1929	Chicago Stadium, Chicago, Illinois, US	
14	Win	9–3–2	Mickey Furey	KO	2 (4), 1:04	May 24, 1929	Chicago Stadium, Chicago, Illinois, US	
13	Win	8–3–2	Art Schragel	TKO	1 (5)	Apr 29, 1929	White City Arena, Chicago, Illinois, US	
12	Loss	7–3–2	Johnny Sherrod	PTS	5	Mar 25, 1929	Coliseum, Chicago, Illinois, US	
11	Win	7–2–2	Chuck Benoit	KO	1 (5)	Mar 12, 1929	Coliseum, Chicago, Illinois, US	
10	Win	6–2–2	Billy O'Brien	TKO	3 (6)	Feb 4, 1929	White City Arena, Chicago, Illinois, US	
9	Draw	5–2–2	Johnny DeCoursey	PTS	6	Jan 22, 1929	Hippodrome, Chicago, Illinois, US	
8	Win	5–2–1	Sam Curtis	PTS	4	Jan 8, 1929	Hippodrome, Chicago, Illinois, US	
7	Win	4–2–1	Mickey Furey	PTS	4	Nov 26, 1928	White City Arena, Chicago, Illinois, US	
6	Win	3–2–1	Nick Taft	KO	2 (4)	Oct 29, 1928	White City Arena, Chicago, Illinois, US	
5	Loss	2–2–1	Cecil Hurt	DQ	3 (6)	Oct 9, 1928	Midway Gardens, Chicago, Illinois, US	
4	Draw	2–1–1	Russell Buelick	PTS	4	Sep 27, 1928	Midway Gardens, Chicago, Illinois, US	
3	Win	2–1	Jimmy Gardner	PTS	4	Sep 6, 1928	Mills Stadium, Chicago, Illinois, US	
2	Win	1–1	Joe Greb	PTS	4	Aug 20, 1928	Midway Gardens, Chicago, Illinois, US	
1	Loss	0–1	Nick Taft	PTS	4	Jul 13, 1928	Hippodrome, Chicago, Illinois, US	

=== Unofficial record ===
118 fights	74 wins	37 losses
By knockout	40	5
By decision	34	30
By disqualification	0	2
Draws	7	

Record with the inclusion of newspaper decisions in the win/loss/draw column.

No.	Result	Record	Opponent	Type	Round, time	Date	Location	Notes
118	Loss	74–37–7	Frankie Edgren	KO	3 (10)	Jul 11, 1939	Hodges Field, Memphis, Tennessee, US	
117	Loss	74–36–7	Jay D. Turner	PTS	10	Jun 2, 1939	Dallas, Texas, US	
116	Loss	74–35–7	Babe Ritchie	KO	3 (10), 1:04	May 31, 1939	Softball Park, Lubbock, Texas, US	
115	Loss	74–34–7	Johnny Paychek	TKO	3 (8)	Jul 11, 1938	Riverview Park, Des Moines, Iowa, US	
114	Win	74–33–7	Jack Conley	KO	2 (10)	Oct 7, 1937	Dubuque, Iowa, US	
113	Loss	73–33–7	Jack Doyle	PTS	12	Apr 27, 1937	Empire Pool, Wembley, England	
112	Loss	73–32–7	Bob Nestell	PTS	10 (10), 2:43	Feb 9, 1937	Olympic Auditorium, Los Angeles, California, US	
111	Loss	73–31–7	Maxie Rosenbloom	PTS	10	Jan 5, 1937	Olympic Auditorium, Los Angeles, California, US	
110	Win	73–30–7	Babe Hunt	TKO	6 (10), 0:25	Dec 1, 1936	Olympic Auditorium, Los Angeles, California, US	
109	Draw	72–30–7	Nash Garrison	PTS	10	Nov 10, 1936	Civic Auditorium, San Jose, California, US	
108	Win	72–30–6	Leo Lomski	PTS	10	Sep 22, 1936	Auditorium, Portland, Oregon, US	
107	Loss	71–30–6	Marty Gallagher	UD	10	Sep 1, 1936	Griffith Stadium, Washington, District of Columbia, US	
106	Win	71–29–6	Big Boy Brackey	PTS	10	Jul 20, 1936	Offermann Stadium, Buffalo, New York, US	
105	Loss	70–29–6	Lee Ramage	PTS	10	Jul 7, 1936	Olympic Auditorium, Los Angeles, California, US	
104	Win	70–28–6	Joe Bauer	PTS	10	Jun 26, 1936	Legion Stadium, Hollywood, California, US	
103	Win	69–28–6	Harold Murphy	PTS	10	Jun 5, 1936	Coliseum, San Diego, California, US	
102	Win	68–28–6	Pepe Del Rio	TKO	2 (10), 1:38	May 26, 1936	Olympic Auditorium, Los Angeles, California, US	
101	Draw	67–28–6	Lee Ramage	PTS	10	Apr 7, 1936	Olympic Auditorium, Los Angeles, California, US	
100	Loss	67–28–5	Phil Brubaker	PTS	10	Feb 14, 1936	Dreamland Auditorium, San Francisco, California, US	
99	Win	67–27–5	Alfred Rogers	KO	4 (10)	Jan 27, 1936	Auditorium, Oakland, California, US	
98	Win	66–27–5	Hank Hankinson	PTS	10	Jan 14, 1936	Olympic Auditorium, Los Angeles, California, US	
97	Loss	65–27–5	Marty Gallagher	PTS	10	Oct 9, 1935	Griffith Stadium, Washington, District of Columbia, US	
96	Loss	65–26–5	Joe Louis	TKO	1 (10), 2:21	Aug 7, 1935	Comiskey Park, Chicago, Illinois, US	
95	Win	65–25–5	Tom Jones	PTS	4	Jun 10, 1935	Peoria, Illinois, US	
94	Win	64–25–5	Jack Slade	KO	2 (10), 0:41	Jun 7, 1935	Municipal Stadium, Davenport, Iowa, US	
93	Win	63–25–5	Hans Birkie	PTS	10	May 27, 1935	Maple Leaf Gardens, Toronto, Ontario, Canada	
92	Win	62–25–5	Hans Birkie	KO	4 (?), 2:54	Apr 15, 1935	City Auditorium, Denver, Colorado, US	
91	Win	61–25–5	Bob Williams	KO	1 (?), 2:54	Apr 4, 1935	Tulsa, Oklahoma, US	
90	Win	60–25–5	Joe Rice	KO	2 (10)	Apr 1, 1935	Oklahoma City, Oklahoma, US	
89	Win	59–25–5	Babe Hunt	PTS	10	Mar 27, 1935	Fair Park Live Stock Arena, Dallas, Texas, US	
88	Win	58–25–5	Salvatore Ruggirello	TKO	2 (10)	Mar 4, 1935	Benjamin Field Arena, Tampa, Florida, US	
87	Win	57–25–5	Jack Townsend	KO	2 (?)	Feb 21, 1935	Daytona Beach, Florida, US	
86	Win	56–25–5	Jack Townsend	KO	2 (?)	Feb 19, 1935	Jacksonville, Florida, US	
85	Win	55–25–5	Ted DeMarino	KO	2 (10)	Feb 14, 1935	Dixie Theatre, West Palm Beach, Florida, US	
84	Win	54–25–5	Eddie Civil	TKO	2 (10)	Feb 11, 1935	Benjamin Field Arena, Tampa, Florida, US	
83	Win	53–25–5	Merrill 'Red' Tonn	KO	6 (10)	Feb 4, 1935	Legion Coliseum, Sarasota, Florida, US	
82	Draw	52–25–5	Art Lasky	PTS	10	Nov 23, 1934	Chicago Stadium, Chicago, Illinois, US	
81	Win	52–25–4	Salvatore Ruggirello	KO	3 (10)	Sep 28, 1934	Auditorium, Milwaukee, Wisconsin, US	
80	Win	51–25–4	Art Sykes	PTS	10	Sep 20, 1934	Wrigley Field, Chicago, Illinois, US	
79	Loss	50–25–4	Art Lasky	UD	10	Jun 12, 1934	Olympic Auditorium, Los Angeles, California, US	
78	Win	50–24–4	Lee Ramage	PTS	10	Apr 17, 1934	Olympic Auditorium, Los Angeles, California, US	
77	Loss	49–24–4	Walter Neusel	MD	10	Mar 9, 1934	Madison Square Garden, New York City, New York, US	
76	Win	49–23–4	Charley Massera	SD	10	Feb 9, 1934	Madison Square Garden, New York City, New York, US	
75	Win	48–23–4	Don McCorkindale	PTS	10	Dec 29, 1933	Chicago Stadium, Chicago, Illinois, US	
74	Win	47–23–4	Jack Sharkey	UD	10	Sep 18, 1933	Comiskey Park, Chicago, Illinois, US	
73	Win	46–23–4	Tuffy Griffiths	UD	10	Jun 2, 1933	Mills Stadium, Chicago, Illinois, US	
72	Win	45–23–4	Charley Retzlaff	KO	1 (10), 2:15	May 3, 1933	Chicago Stadium, Chicago, Illinois, US	
71	Loss	44–23–4	Johnny Risko	PTS	10	Feb 24, 1933	Madison Square Garden, New York City, New York, US	
70	Win	44–22–4	Unknown Winston	PTS	10	Feb 2, 1933	Convention Hall, Philadelphia, Pennsylvania, US	
69	Win	43–22–4	Meyer K.O. Christner	TKO	5 (?)	Jan 23, 1933	St. Nicholas Arena, New York City, New York, US	
68	Loss	42–22–4	Tommy Loughran	UD	10	Jan 10, 1933	Convention Hall, Philadelphia, Pennsylvania, US	
67	Loss	42–21–4	Primo Carnera	SD	10	Dec 9, 1932	Chicago Stadium, Chicago, Illinois, US	
66	Loss	42–20–4	Joe Sekyra	NWS	10	Oct 13, 1932	Auditorium, Minneapolis, Minnesota, US	
65	Win	42–19–4	Angus Snyder	TKO	3 (10)	Sep 22, 1932	City Auditorium, Omaha, Nebraska, US	
64	Loss	41–19–4	Johnny Risko	PTS	12	Sep 1, 1932	Municipal Stadium, Cleveland, Ohio, US	
63	Loss	41–18–4	Max Baer	PTS	20	Jul 4, 1932	Dempsey's Bowl, Reno, Nevada, US	
62	Loss	41–17–4	Mickey Walker	SD	10	Apr 29, 1932	Chicago Stadium, Chicago, Illinois, US	
61	Loss	41–16–4	Max Baer	UD	10	Jan 29, 1932	Madison Square Garden, New York City, New York, US	
60	Win	41–15–4	Paulino Uzcudun	MD	10	Jan 15, 1932	Chicago Stadium, Chicago, Illinois, US	
59	Win	40–15–4	Tommy Loughran	UD	10	Dec 18, 1931	Madison Square Garden, New York City, New York, US	
58	Loss	39–15–4	Primo Carnera	UD	10	Nov 19, 1931	Chicago Stadium, Chicago, Illinois, US	
57	Win	39–14–4	Jimmy Slattery	PTS	10	Oct 30, 1931	Olympia Stadium, Detroit, Michigan, US	
56	Win	38–14–4	Joe Sekyra	MD	10	Sep 30, 1931	Coliseum, Chicago, Illinois, US	
55	Draw	37–14–4	Young Con O'Kelly	SD	10	Sep 9, 1931	White City Arena, Chicago, Illinois, US	
54	Loss	37–14–3	Ace Hudkins	PTS	10	Jul 1, 1931	Mills Stadium, Chicago, Illinois, US	
53	Win	37–13–3	Pat McCarthy	TKO	4 (10)	Jun 9, 1931	Kanawha Park, Charleston, West Virginia, US	
52	Win	36–13–3	Emmett Rocco	PTS	10	May 8, 1931	Chicago Stadium, Chicago, Illinois, US	
51	Loss	35–13–3	Emmett Rocco	PTS	10	Apr 27, 1931	Motor Square Garden, Pittsburgh, Pennsylvania, US	
50	Loss	35–12–3	Johnny Risko	PTS	10	Apr 21, 1931	Arena, Boston, Massachusetts, US	
49	Win	35–11–3	Young Con O'Kelly	UD	10	Mar 31, 1931	Arena, Boston, Massachusetts, US	
48	Loss	34–11–3	Tuffy Griffiths	PTS	10	Mar 6, 1931	Chicago Stadium, Chicago, Illinois, US	
47	Win	34–10–3	Jack Gagnon	KO	3 (10)	Feb 6, 1931	Boston Garden, Boston, Massachusetts, US	
46	Win	33–10–3	Harry Dillon	KO	2 (?)	Jan 30, 1931	Riverview Rink, Milwaukee, Wisconsin, US	
45	Loss	32–10–3	Jimmy Slattery	PTS	10	Jan 14, 1931	Chicago Stadium, Chicago, Illinois, US	
44	Loss	32–9–3	Tommy Loughran	UD	10	Nov 21, 1930	Chicago Stadium, Chicago, Illinois, US	
43	Win	32–8–3	Jimmy Slattery	SD	10	Nov 6, 1930	Chicago Stadium, Chicago, Illinois, US	
42	Win	31–8–3	Tom Kirby	KO	2 (10)	Oct 14, 1930	Chicago Stadium, Chicago, Illinois, US	
41	Win	30–8–3	Leo Lomski	KO	5 (10)	Sep 11, 1930	Chicago Stadium, Chicago, Illinois, US	
40	Win	29–8–3	Jack Kracken	TKO	6 (10)	Aug 29, 1930	Jones & Baumrucker Park, Chicago, Illinois, US	
39	Win	28–8–3	Len Darcy	PTS	10	Aug 16, 1930	North Shore Arena, South Haven, Michigan, US	
38	Win	27–8–3	Bud Doran	PTS	10	Aug 1, 1930	Jones & Baumrucker Park, Chicago, Illinois, US	
37	Win	26–8–3	Jimmy Mahoney	KO	4 (10)	Jul 18, 1930	Jones & Baumrucker Park, Chicago, Illinois, US	
36	Win	25–8–3	K.O. White	PTS	10	Jul 11, 1930	Jones & Baumrucker Park, Chicago, Illinois, US	
35	Loss	24–8–3	Paul Pantaleo	PTS	10	Jun 20, 1930	Blue Mound Race Track, Milwaukee, Wisconsin, US	
34	Win	24–7–3	Mitz Minikel	KO	1 (10)	May 28, 1930	Auditorium, Milwaukee, Wisconsin, US	
33	Win	23–7–3	Al Keegan	TKO	1 (4)	Apr 30, 1930	Chicago Stadium, Chicago, Illinois, US	
32	Loss	22–7–3	Mitz Minikel	PTS	10	Apr 21, 1930	Auditorium, Milwaukee, Wisconsin, US	
31	Win	22–6–3	Dave Maier	TKO	1 (10)	Apr 3, 1930	Auditorium, Milwaukee, Wisconsin, US	
30	Loss	21–6–3	Paul Swiderski	PTS	8	Mar 24, 1930	White City Arena, Chicago, Illinois, US	
29	Win	21–5–3	Leon Lucas	KO	6 (?)	Mar 8, 1930	Auditorium, Milwaukee, Wisconsin, US	
28	Loss	20–5–3	Al Stillman	NWS	5	Feb 11, 1930	Arena, Saint Louis, Missouri, US	
27	Win	20–4–3	Chick Rife	TKO	1 (4)	Feb 7, 1930	Coliseum, Chicago, Illinois, US	
26	Win	19–4–3	Jack Barry	PTS	6	Jan 31, 1930	Chicago Stadium, Chicago, Illinois, US	
25	Win	18–4–3	Johnny Freeman	PTS	8	Jan 23, 1930	Rainbo Fronton, Chicago, Illinois, US	
24	Win	17–4–3	Tom Jones	PTS	8	Dec 26, 1929	Ashland Blvd. Auditorium, Chicago, Illinois, US	
23	Loss	16–4–3	Ted Ross	DQ	6 (10)	Nov 18, 1929	White City Arena, Chicago, Illinois, US	Levinsky DQ'd for butting, thumbing, and elbowing
22	Win	16–3–3	Russell Buelick	KO	4 (6)	Oct 29, 1929	Guyon's Paradise Ballroom, Chicago, Illinois, US	
21	Win	15–3–3	Russell Buelick	KO	1 (6)	Oct 22, 1929	Guyon's Paradise Ballroom, Chicago, Illinois, US	
20	Win	14–3–3	Nick Taft	TKO	3 (5)	Oct 16, 1929	Chicago Stadium, Chicago, Illinois, US	
19	Win	13–3–3	Tommy O'Brien	UD	10	Aug 12, 1929	Logan Square Baseball Park, Chicago, Illinois, US	
18	Win	12–3–3	Johnny Sherrod	PTS	6	Jul 9, 1929	Logan Square Baseball Park, Chicago, Illinois, US	
17	Win	11–3–3	Frankie Ryan	KO	1 (4)	Jul 4, 1929	Mills Stadium, Chicago, Illinois, US	
16	Win	10–3–3	Joe Corrado	KO	4 (6)	Jun 24, 1929	Logan Square Baseball Park, Chicago, Illinois, US	
15	Draw	9–3–3	Joe Corrado	PTS	4	Jun 10, 1929	Chicago Stadium, Chicago, Illinois, US	
14	Win	9–3–2	Mickey Furey	KO	2 (4), 1:04	May 24, 1929	Chicago Stadium, Chicago, Illinois, US	
13	Win	8–3–2	Art Schragel	TKO	1 (5)	Apr 29, 1929	White City Arena, Chicago, Illinois, US	
12	Loss	7–3–2	Johnny Sherrod	PTS	5	Mar 25, 1929	Coliseum, Chicago, Illinois, US	
11	Win	7–2–2	Chuck Benoit	KO	1 (5)	Mar 12, 1929	Coliseum, Chicago, Illinois, US	
10	Win	6–2–2	Billy O'Brien	TKO	3 (6)	Feb 4, 1929	White City Arena, Chicago, Illinois, US	
9	Draw	5–2–2	Johnny DeCoursey	PTS	6	Jan 22, 1929	Hippodrome, Chicago, Illinois, US	
8	Win	5–2–1	Sam Curtis	PTS	4	Jan 8, 1929	Hippodrome, Chicago, Illinois, US	
7	Win	4–2–1	Mickey Furey	PTS	4	Nov 26, 1928	White City Arena, Chicago, Illinois, US	
6	Win	3–2–1	Nick Taft	KO	2 (4)	Oct 29, 1928	White City Arena, Chicago, Illinois, US	
5	Loss	2–2–1	Cecil Hurt	DQ	3 (6)	Oct 9, 1928	Midway Gardens, Chicago, Illinois, US	
4	Draw	2–1–1	Russell Buelick	PTS	4	Sep 27, 1928	Midway Gardens, Chicago, Illinois, US	
3	Win	2–1	Jimmy Gardner	PTS	4	Sep 6, 1928	Mills Stadium, Chicago, Illinois, US	
2	Win	1–1	Joe Greb	PTS	4	Aug 20, 1928	Midway Gardens, Chicago, Illinois, US	
1	Loss	0–1	Nick Taft	PTS	4	Jul 13, 1928	Hippodrome, Chicago, Illinois, US	
