= Glickman =

Glickman is a surname. Notable people with the surname include:

- Dan Glickman (born 1944), American politician
- Dov Glickman (born 1949), Israeli actor
- Golda Glickman (c. 1916–?), better known as Roxana Sand or Roxanne Carmine, erotic dancer and fan dancer
- Harry Glickman (1924–2020), founder of the National Basketball Association's Portland Trail Blazers
- Irving Glickman (1914–1972), American periodontist
- Jonathan Glickman (born 1969), American film producer
- Kevon Glickman (born 1960), American music producer and entertainment lawyer
- Lawrence B. Glickman (born 1963), American historian
- Marty Glickman (1917–2001), American track and field athlete and sports announcer
- Mort Glickman (1898–1953), American composer
- Stephen H. Glickman (born 1948), American judge
- Stephen Kramer Glickman (born 1979), American actor
- Susan Glickman (born 1953), Canadian writer and critic
- Sylvia Glickman (1932–2006), American composer
- Todd Glickman (born 1956), American meteorologist
- Will Glickman (1910–1983), American playwright

== See also ==
- Loretta Thompson-Glickman (1945–2001), American politician
- Max Gluckman (1911–1975), South African social anthropologist
