= The Crowd Roars (1938 film) =

1938 film by Richard Thorpe

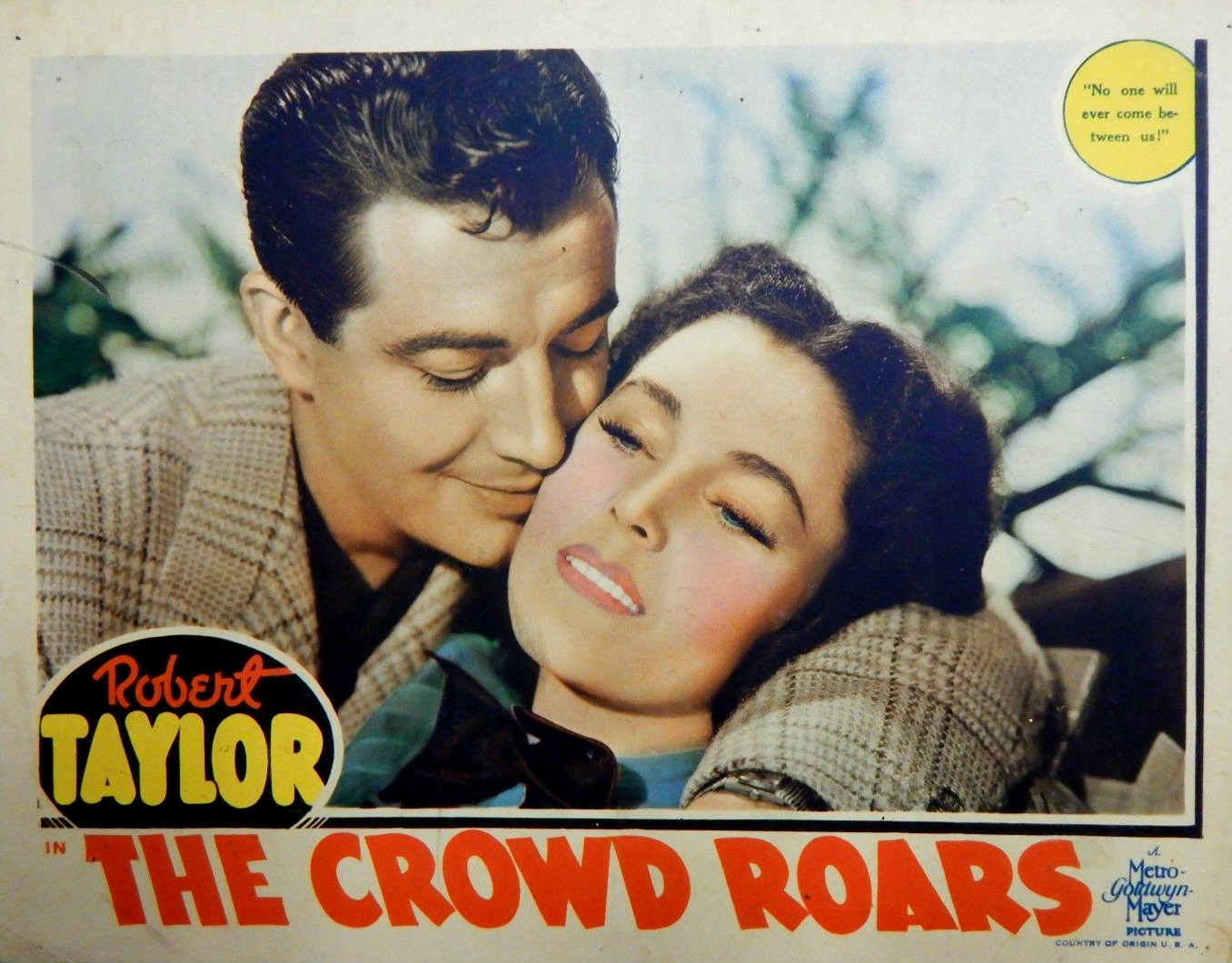
- Lobby card
- Directed by: Richard Thorpe
- Written by: George Bruce (story and screenplay); Thomas Lennon; George Oppenheimer
- Produced by: Sam Zimbalist
- Starring: Robert Taylor; Edward Arnold; Frank Morgan; Maureen O'Sullivan
- Cinematography: John F. Seitz; Oliver T. Marsh (uncredited)
- Edited by: Conrad A. Nervig
- Music by: Edward Ward
- Production company: Metro-Goldwyn-Mayer
- Distributed by: Loew's Inc.
- Release date: August 5, 1938
- Running time: 87-92 minutes
- Country: United States
- Language: English
- Budget: $511,000
- Box office: $2,032,000

The Crowd Roars is a 1938 American sports drama film directed by Richard Thorpe and starring Robert Taylor as a boxer who gets entangled in the seamier side of the sport. It was remade in 1947 as Killer McCoy, featuring Mickey Rooney in the title role. This film was not a remake of the 1932 film of the same name starring James Cagney. The supporting cast for the 1938 version features Edward Arnold, Frank Morgan, Lionel Stander, and Jane Wyman.

== Plot ==
Tommy McCoy becomes a boxer, not for love of the sport but for the money. He has to put up with his alcoholic, gambling father Brian. Just before his first major fight, Tommy learns that his opponent has been injured and has been replaced at the last minute by Tommy's good friend, former world champion Johnny, trying to make a comeback. During the bout, Tommy kills Johnny and is named "Killer McCoy" in the newspapers. He then comes under the control of powerful bookmaker Jim Cain.

While training, Tommy meets and falls in love with Cain's daughter Sheila. Cain has been very careful to keep his daughter from learning about his profession. Cain tries to break up their romance, but without success.

Tommy wins fight after fight, becoming a contender. If he wins his next bout, he will get a shot at the world championship title. However, "Pug" Walsh, a traitorous associate of Cain's, sends Tommy a bouquet of flowers with a message and Sheila's driving license (which erroneously spells her first name) indicating that she and the elder McCoy have been kidnapped. He orders Tommy to lose the fight in the eighth round or else. Tommy has no choice; he endures a merciless pounding for round after round, not even daring to hit his foe for fear a lucky punch could end the match and his loved ones' lives. Brian pretends to collapse, then manages to grab a gangster's gun. He sends Sheila to the fight, while he holds their two former captors at gunpoint. However, while he is distracted by the radio broadcast of the fight, one of the men shoots him; he fires back, and all three are killed. Sheila arrives just before the start of the eighth round. Tommy proceeds to knock out his opponent, then announces he is giving up boxing. Cain also retires. Afterward, Tommy and Sheila get married.

== Cast ==
- Robert Taylor as Tommy "Killer" McCoy
- Edward Arnold as Jim Cain, aka James W. Carson
- Frank Morgan as Brian McCoy
- Maureen O'Sullivan as Sheila Carson
- William Gargan as Johnny Martin
- Lionel Stander as "Happy" Lane
- Jane Wyman as Vivian
- Nat Pendleton as "Pug" Walsh
- Art Lasky uncredited role as the fighter "McAvoy"
- Charles D. Brown as Bill Thorne
- Gene Reynolds as Tommy McCoy as a boy
- Don "Red" Barry as Pete Mariola
- Donald Douglas as Murray
- Isabel Jewell as Mrs. Martin
- J. Farrell MacDonald as Father Patrick Ryan
- Horace McMahon as Rocky Simpson

== Reception ==
According to MGM records the film earned $1,369,000 in the US and Canada and $663,000 elsewhere, resulting in a profit of $761,000.

== See also ==
- List of boxing films
