= Jimmy Slattery =

American boxer

Personal information
- Nickname: Slats
- Nationality: United States
- Born: James Edward Slattery; 1904-08-25 Buffalo, NY
- Died: August 30, 1960 (aged 56)
- Weight: Lightweight; Welterweight; Middleweight; Light heavyweight

Boxing career
- Stance: Orthodox

Boxing record
- Total fights: 129
- Wins: 114
- Win by KO: 49
- Losses: 13
- No contests: 2

James Edward Slattery (August 25, 1904 in Buffalo, New York – August 30, 1960) was an American professional boxer who twice reigned as the NYSAC world light-heavyweight champion, once in 1927 and again in 1930. He was inducted into the Greater Buffalo Sports Hall of Fame in 1992, Buffalo Veteran Boxers Association Ring #44 in 1997 and the International Boxing Hall of Fame in 2006.

== Professional career ==
=== World light heavyweight champion ===
Slattery, son of a Buffalo fire fighter, turned pro in 1921 and came up short in his challenge for the World Light Heavyweight Title against Paul Berlenbach in 1925. His KO loss in 1925 to Dave Shade was named Ring Magazine Upset of the Year. Slattery won the vacant NBA light heavyweight title in August 1927 with a decision over Maxie Rosenbloom, only to lose it to Tommy Loughran in December of that year.

He won the NYSAC World Light Heavyweight Title by beating Lou Scozza on February 10, 1930, in Broadway Auditorium. Slattery lost the title later that year in a bout at Bison Stadium against Maxie Rosenbloom for the NYSAC World Light Heavyweight Title and the Undisputed World Light Heavyweight Title. The verdict was "highly unpopular" with the 15,000 fans at the fight. The United Press score sheet gave Rosenbloom eight rounds and Slattery four, with three even. Referee Patsy Haley, after being almost knocked out by one of Rosenbloom's wild swings, gave his decision to Slattery. He was overruled by two judges, both of whom voted for Rosenbloom.

== Death and legacy ==
Alcoholism almost certainly shortened Slattery's life, career and marriage (he had famously eloped with 19-year-old Elizabeth A. Pendergast). In 1943, his second wife, Mildred, had him committed to the alcoholic ward at Bellevue Hospital. During the Great Depression, Slattery was known to throw money out of the window of his car while driving through the streets in order to help the poor children buy new shoes for school. A play about Slattery's life, Jimmytown, written by Anthony Cardinale, was produced in Buffalo in 1997; Jimmy Slattery Place, in South Buffalo, was named in his honor in 2006. A diagnosis of tuberculosis significantly impacted his health during the last decades of his life. Slattery died of pulmonary tuberculosis on August 30, 1960, in Buffalo, New York. His former wife, Elizabeth Ann Burgess (née Pendergast) died in 1998; they had divorced in 1940.

== Professional boxing record ==
All information in this section is derived from BoxRec, unless otherwise stated.

=== Official record ===
129 fights	111 wins	13 losses
By knockout	49	4
By decision	60	9
By disqualification	2	0
No contests	2	
Newspaper decisions/draws	3	

All newspaper decisions are officially regarded as “no decision” bouts and are not counted in the win/loss/draw column.

No.	Result	Record	Opponent	Type	Round	Date	Location	Note
129	Win	111–13 (5)	Eddie Kaminski	DQ	5 (6)	Jun 19, 1934	Bison Stadium, Buffalo, New York, U.S.	
128	Win	110–13 (5)	Gus Flugel	KO	2 (6)	Jun 1, 1934	Bison Stadium, Buffalo, New York, U.S.	
127	Win	109–13 (5)	Walter Kugel	TKO	5 (6)	May 21, 1934	Broadway Auditorium, Buffalo, New York, U.S.	
126	Loss	108–13 (5)	Charley Belanger	TKO	2 (10)	Aug 22, 1932	Bison Stadium, Buffalo, New York, U.S.	
125	Win	108–12 (5)	Eddie Connors	PTS	4	Jun 7, 1932	Broadway Auditorium, Buffalo, New York, U.S.	
124	Loss	107–12 (5)	King Levinsky	PTS	10	Oct 30, 1931	Olympia Stadium, Detroit, Michigan, U.S.	
123	Loss	107–11 (5)	Maxie Rosenbloom	UD	15	Aug 5, 1931	Ebbets Field, Brooklyn, New York City, New York, U.S.	For NYSAC and The Ring light heavyweight titles
122	Win	107–10 (5)	Tom Heeney	PTS	6	Apr 20, 1931	Buffalo Auditorium, Buffalo, New York, U.S.	
121	Win	106–10 (5)	King Levinsky	PTS	10	Jan 14, 1931	Chicago Stadium, Chicago, Illinois, U.S.	
120	Loss	105–10 (5)	King Levinsky	SD	10	Nov 6, 1930	Chicago Stadium, Chicago, Illinois, U.S.	
119	NC	105–9 (5)	Len Darcy	NC	8 (10)	Sep 30, 1930	State Fair Coliseum, Syracuse, New York, U.S.	The crowd cheered when the referee finally called a halt to the contest
118	Win	105–9 (4)	Otis Gardner	KO	2 (10)	Aug 22, 1930	Arena, Schenectady, New York, U.S.	
117	Loss	104–9 (4)	Maxie Rosenbloom	SD	15	Jun 25, 1930	Bison Stadium, Buffalo, New York, U.S.	Lost NYSAC light heavyweight title; For vacant The Ring light heavyweight title
116	NC	104–8 (4)	Pete Latzo	NC	7 (10)	May 27, 1930	Boston Garden, Boston, Massachusetts, U.S.	After being jeered for seven rounds [both] were thrown out of the ring by referee Johnny Brassil
115	Win	104–8 (3)	Lou Scozza	MD	15	Feb 10, 1930	Broadway Auditorium, Buffalo, New York, U.S.	Won vacant NYSAC light heavyweight title
114	Win	103–8 (3)	Eddie Connors	TKO	2 (4)	Dec 23, 1929	Convention Hall, Rochester, New York, U.S.	
113	Win	102–8 (3)	Maxie Rosenbloom	MD	10	Nov 25, 1929	Broadway Auditorium, Buffalo, New York, U.S.	
112	Win	101–8 (3)	Johnny Haystack	KO	1 (6)	Nov 11, 1929	Broadway Auditorium, Buffalo, New York, U.S.	
111	Loss	100–8 (3)	Maxie Rosenbloom	PTS	10	Oct 14, 1929	Arena, Philadelphia, Pennsylvania, U.S.	
110	Win	100–7 (3)	Len Darcy	PTS	6	Sep 30, 1929	Broadway Auditorium, Buffalo, New York, U.S.	
109	Win	99–7 (3)	Len Darcy	NWS	10	Jul 2, 1929	North End Baseball Park, Steubenville, Ohio, U.S.	
108	Loss	99–7 (2)	James J. Braddock	TKO	9 (10)	Mar 11, 1929	Madison Square Garden, New York City, New York, U.S.	
107	Win	99–6 (2)	Len Darcy	PTS	6	Mar 4, 1929	Broadway Auditorium, Buffalo, New York, U.S.	
106	Win	98–6 (2)	Jimmy Mahoney	KO	3 (10)	Jan 21, 1929	Broadway Auditorium, Buffalo, New York, U.S.	
105	Win	97–6 (2)	Jimmy Mahoney	PTS	10	Dec 10, 1928	Broadway Auditorium, Buffalo, New York, U.S.	
104	Win	96–6 (2)	Vic McLaughlin	TKO	6 (10)	Nov 5, 1928	Cadle Tabernacle, Indianapolis, Indiana, U.S.	
103	Win	95–6 (2)	Otis Gardner	KO	2 (10)	Oct 29, 1928	Tacoma Skating Rink, Dayton, Kentucky, U.S.	
102	Win	94–6 (2)	Sergeant Jack Lynch	KO	2 (10)	Oct 8, 1928	Tacoma Skating Rink, Dayton, Kentucky, U.S.	
101	Win	93–6 (2)	Tony Marullo	PTS	10	Jun 18, 1928	Broadway Auditorium, Buffalo, New York, U.S.	
100	Win	92–6 (2)	Stanley Smith	KO	2 (10)	May 9, 1928	Seneca Junction Pavilion, Seneca Junction, New York, U.S.	
99	Win	91–6 (2)	Tony Marullo	PTS	10	Apr 30, 1928	113th Regiment Armory, Newark, New Jersey, U.S.	
98	Win	90–6 (2)	Billy Vidabeck	UD	10	Apr 23, 1928	Broadway Auditorium, Buffalo, New York, U.S.	
97	Win	89–6 (2)	Frankie Muskie	KO	3 (6)	Mar 19, 1928	Broadway Auditorium, Buffalo, New York, U.S.	
96	Loss	88–6 (2)	Tommy Loughran	MD	15	Dec 12, 1927	Madison Square Garden, New York City, New York, U.S.	Lost NBA light heavyweight title; For NYSAC and vacant The Ring light heavyweight titles
95	Win	88–5 (2)	Joe Lohman	PTS	10	Dec 2, 1927	Akron, Ohio, U.S.	
94	Win	87–5 (2)	Pat McCarthy	PTS	6	Nov 23, 1927	Broadway Auditorium, Buffalo, New York, U.S.	
93	Win	86–5 (2)	Murray Gitlitz	TKO	6 (10)	Nov 2, 1927	Broadway Auditorium, Buffalo, New York, U.S.	
92	Win	85–5 (2)	Maxie Rosenbloom	PTS	10	Aug 30, 1927	Velodrome, Hartford, Connecticut, U.S.	Won vacant NBA light heavyweight title
91	Win	84–5 (2)	Lew Chester	PTS	10	Apr 18, 1927	Broadway Auditorium, Buffalo, New York, U.S.	
90	Win	83–5 (2)	Johnny Risko	DQ	5 (6)	Mar 28, 1927	Broadway Auditorium, Buffalo, New York, U.S.	Risko DQ'ed for repeated low blows
89	Win	82–5 (2)	George Gemas	TKO	3 (6)	Mar 7, 1927	Broadway Auditorium, Buffalo, New York, U.S.	
88	Win	81–5 (2)	Ray Fay	PTS	6	Feb 21, 1927	Broadway Auditorium, Buffalo, New York, U.S.	
87	Win	80–5 (2)	Mike Wallace	PTS	10	Dec 13, 1926	Broadway Auditorium, Buffalo, New York, U.S.	
86	Win	79–5 (2)	Martin O'Grady	KO	2 (?)	Oct 25, 1926	Broadway Auditorium, Buffalo, New York, U.S.	
85	Win	78–5 (2)	Tom Burns	TKO	8 (10)	Oct 4, 1926	Broadway Auditorium, Buffalo, New York, U.S.	
84	Win	77–5 (2)	Jack Schoendorf	TKO	7 (10)	Sep 27, 1926	Coliseum Arena, Jamestown, New York, U.S.	
83	Win	76–5 (2)	Billy Britton	KO	1 (10)	Jul 30, 1926	Chadwick Park, Albany, New York, U.S.	
82	Win	75–5 (2)	Jackie Clark	PTS	10	Jul 8, 1926	Madison Square Garden, New York City, New York, U.S.	
81	Win	74–5 (2)	Jackie Clark	NWS	10	Jul 1, 1926	Playgrounds Stadium, West New York, New Jersey, U.S.	
80	Loss	74–5 (1)	Young Stribling	PTS	10	Mar 25, 1926	Madison Square Garden, New York City, New York, U.S.	
79	Win	74–4 (1)	Tommy Robson	PTS	10	Feb 1, 1926	Broadway Auditorium, Buffalo, New York, U.S.	
78	Win	73–4 (1)	Roland Todd	PTS	10	Jan 16, 1926	Mechanics Building, Boston, Massachusetts, U.S.	
77	Win	72–4 (1)	Tom Burns	NWS	10	Jan 13, 1926	Armory, Grand Rapids, Michigan, U.S.	
76	Win	72–4	Maxie Rosenbloom	PTS	10	Jan 1, 1926	Broadway Auditorium, Buffalo, New York, U.S.	
75	Win	71–4	Joe Burke	KO	3 (10)	Dec 23, 1925	Warren, Pennsylvania, U.S.	
74	Win	70–4	Noel McCormick	PTS	10	Dec 21, 1925	Broadway Auditorium, Buffalo, New York, U.S.	
73	Win	69–4	Patsy Motto	TKO	4 (10)	Dec 11, 1925	Arena, Syracuse, New York, U.S.	
72	Loss	68–4	Paul Berlenbach	TKO	11 (15)	Sep 11, 1925	Yankee Stadium, Bronx, New York City, New York, U.S.	For NBA, NYSAC, and The Ring light heavyweight titles
71	Win	68–3	Frank Carpenter	TKO	4 (10)	Sep 4, 1925	Bison Stadium, Buffalo, New York, U.S.	
70	Win	67–3	Maxie Rosenbloom	UD	6	Aug 22, 1925	Coney Island Stadium, Brooklyn, New York City, New York, U.S.	
69	Loss	66–3	Dave Shade	TKO	3 (10)	Jul 2, 1925	Polo Grounds, New York City, New York, U.S.	
68	Win	66–2	Billy Conley	TKO	6 (10)	Jun 22, 1925	Brassco Park, Waterbury, Connecticut, U.S.	
67	Win	65–2	Johnny Gill	PTS	10	Jun 9, 1925	Mechanics Building, Boston, Massachusetts, U.S.	
66	Win	64–2	Jack Burke	TKO	2 (6)	May 30, 1925	Yankee Stadium, Bronx, New York City, New York, U.S.	
65	Win	63–2	Jack MacDonald	KO	3 (6)	May 4, 1925	Broadway Auditorium, Buffalo, New York, U.S.	
64	Win	62–2	Billy McGowan	KO	2 (6)	Apr 20, 1925	Broadway Auditorium, Buffalo, New York, U.S.	
63	Win	61–2	Johnny Vascher	TKO	5 (6)	Apr 13, 1925	Lyceum Theatre, Ithaca, New York, U.S.	
62	Win	60–2	Augie Ratner	TKO	2 (10)	Mar 30, 1925	Mechanics Building, Boston, Massachusetts, U.S.	
61	Win	59–2	Mike Burke	KO	2 (6)	Mar 2, 1925	South Main Street Armory, Wilkes-Barre, Pennsylvania, U.S.	
60	Win	58–2	Jack Delaney	PTS	6	Feb 13, 1925	Madison Square Garden, New York City, New York, U.S.	
59	Win	57–2	Frankie Schoell	KO	3 (6)	Feb 2, 1925	Broadway Auditorium, Buffalo, New York, U.S.	
58	Win	56–2	Joe Lohman	PTS	6	Jan 21, 1925	Broadway Auditorium, Buffalo, New York, U.S.	
57	Win	55–2	Joe Eagan	KO	1 (6)	Jan 1, 1925	Broadway Auditorium, Buffalo, New York, U.S.	
56	Win	54–2	Jack Schoendorf	TKO	2 (6)	Dec 16, 1924	Broadway Auditorium, Buffalo, New York, U.S.	
55	Win	53–2	Vic McLaughlin	PTS	6	Dec 1, 1924	Broadway Auditorium, Buffalo, New York, U.S.	
54	Win	52–2	Jackie Clark	PTS	6	Nov 24, 1924	Convention Hall, Rochester, New York, U.S.	
53	Win	51–2	Norman Genet	PTS	6	Oct 27, 1924	Broadway Auditorium, Buffalo, New York, U.S.	
52	Win	50–2	Jack Delaney	PTS	6	Oct 3, 1924	Madison Square Garden, New York City, New York, U.S.	
51	Win	49–2	Sergeant Jack Lynch	UD	6	Sep 22, 1924	Bison Stadium, Buffalo, New York, U.S.	
50	Loss	48–2	Harry Greb	PTS	6	Sep 3, 1924	Bison Stadium, Buffalo, New York, U.S.	
49	Win	48–1	Kid Numbers	TKO	2 (10)	Jun 12, 1924	Queensboro Stadium, Long Island City, New York City, New York, U.S.	
48	Win	47–1	Sergeant Jack Lynch	PTS	6	Jun 9, 1924	Queensboro Stadium, Long Island City, New York City, New York, U.S.	
47	Win	46–1	Young Fisher	PTS	6	May 29, 1924	Arena, Syracuse, New York, U.S.	
46	Win	45–1	Jackie Clark	PTS	6	May 26, 1924	Broadway Auditorium, Buffalo, New York, U.S.	
45	Win	44–1	Harry Krohn	PTS	6	Apr 28, 1924	Broadway Auditorium, Buffalo, New York, U.S.	
44	Win	43–1	Pat Walsh	KO	2 (6)	Apr 14, 1924	Broadway Auditorium, Buffalo, New York, U.S.	
43	Win	42–1	Fay Keiser	KO	3 (6)	Mar 31, 1924	Broadway Auditorium, Buffalo, New York, U.S.	
42	Win	41–1	Nick Moon	KO	2 (6)	Mar 21, 1924	Arena, Syracuse, New York, U.S.	
41	Win	40–1	Young Stribling	PTS	6	Feb 25, 1924	Broadway Auditorium, Buffalo, New York, U.S.	
40	Win	39–1	Al Cross	TKO	3 (6)	Jan 18, 1924	Arena, Syracuse, New York, U.S.	
39	Loss	38–1	Joe Eagan	PTS	6	Jan 14, 1924	Broadway Auditorium, Buffalo, New York, U.S.	
38	Win	38–0	Nick Moon	PTS	6	Dec 17, 1923	Broadway Auditorium, Buffalo, New York, U.S.	
37	Win	37–0	Jim Lewis	KO	3 (12)	Nov 2, 1923	Erie, Pennsylvania, U.S.	
36	Win	36–0	Johnny Vascher	KO	2 (6)	Oct 29, 1923	Broadway Auditorium, Buffalo, New York, U.S.	
35	Win	35–0	Jack McFarland	UD	10	Oct 1, 1923	Arena, Toronto, Ontario, Canada	
34	Win	34–0	Johnny Klesch	UD	6	Sep 17, 1923	Broadway Auditorium, Buffalo, New York, U.S.	
33	Win	33–0	Wally Hinckle	KO	3 (6)	Aug 27, 1923	Broadway Auditorium, Buffalo, New York, U.S.	
32	Win	32–0	Jack Perry	UD	6	Jun 18, 1923	Broadway Auditorium, Buffalo, New York, U.S.	
31	Win	31–0	K.O. Willie Loughlin	KO	1 (6)	Jun 4, 1923	Broadway Auditorium, Buffalo, New York, U.S.	
30	Win	30–0	Johnny Griffiths	PTS	6	May 21, 1923	Broadway Auditorium, Buffalo, New York, U.S.	
29	Win	29–0	Jimmy Sullivan	PTS	6	May 7, 1923	Broadway Auditorium, Buffalo, New York, U.S.	
28	Win	28–0	Jakob "Soldier" Bartfield	PTS	6	Apr 23, 1923	Broadway Auditorium, Buffalo, New York, U.S.	
27	Win	27–0	Tony Saraco	UD	6	Apr 9, 1923	Broadway Auditorium, Buffalo, New York, U.S.	
26	Win	26–0	Al Cross	PTS	6	Mar 26, 1923	Broadway Auditorium, Buffalo, New York, U.S.	
25	Win	25–0	Jack Prybella	PTS	6	Mar 5, 1923	Broadway Auditorium, Buffalo, New York, U.S.	
24	Win	24–0	Ray Graham	PTS	6	Feb 19, 1923	Broadway Auditorium, Buffalo, New York, U.S.	
23	Win	23–0	Mixer Mitchell	PTS	6	Feb 5, 1923	Broadway Auditorium, Buffalo, New York, U.S.	
22	Win	22–0	Mixer Mitchell	PTS	6	Jan 22, 1923	Broadway Auditorium, Buffalo, New York, U.S.	
21	Win	21–0	Benny Ross	PTS	6	Jan 8, 1923	Broadway Auditorium, Buffalo, New York, U.S.	
20	Win	20–0	Sailor Max Hoffman	PTS	6	Dec 18, 1922	Broadway Auditorium, Buffalo, New York, U.S.	
19	Win	19–0	Jimmy Bova	TKO	5 (6)	Dec 8, 1922	Arena, Syracuse, New York, U.S.	
18	Win	18–0	Sam Willert	TKO	3 (6)	Nov 30, 1922	Broadway Auditorium, Buffalo, New York, U.S.	
17	Win	17–0	Al Linker	KO	3 (6)	Nov 10, 1922	Broadway Auditorium, Buffalo, New York, U.S.	
16	Win	16–0	K.O. Kelly	KO	2 (6)	Oct 16, 1922	Broadway Auditorium, Buffalo, New York, U.S.	
15	Win	15–0	Jack Prybella	PTS	4	Oct 2, 1922	Broadway Auditorium, Buffalo, New York, U.S.	
14	Win	14–0	Joe Cauvel	PTS	4	Sep 1, 1922	Broadway Auditorium, Buffalo, New York, U.S.	
13	Win	13–0	Buddy Merritt	PTS	4	Jul 24, 1922	Broadway Auditorium, Buffalo, New York, U.S.	
12	Win	12–0	Joey Joynt	PTS	4	Jul 3, 1922	Broadway Auditorium, Buffalo, New York, U.S.	
11	Win	11–0	Lee Bailey	PTS	6	Jun 23, 1922	Broadway Auditorium, Buffalo, New York, U.S.	
10	Win	10–0	Mike Peters	TKO	4 (?)	Jun 2, 1922	Convention Hall, Rochester, New York, U.S.	
9	Win	9–0	Jimmy Morris	KO	3 (4)	May 15, 1922	Convention Hall, Rochester, New York, U.S.	
8	Win	8–0	Tommy Sayers	PTS	4	Apr 24, 1922	Broadway Auditorium, Buffalo, New York, U.S.	
7	Win	7–0	Carl Dietz	TKO	2 (4)	Apr 18, 1922	Broadway Auditorium, Buffalo, New York, U.S.	
6	Win	6–0	Tommy Sayers	PTS	4	Mar 13, 1922	Broadway Auditorium, Buffalo, New York, U.S.	
5	Win	5–0	Tommy Sayers	KO	2 (4)	Feb 13, 1922	Broadway Auditorium, Buffalo, New York, U.S.	
4	Win	4–0	Joe Morey	PTS	4	Jan 2, 1922	Broadway Auditorium, Buffalo, New York, U.S.	
3	Win	3–0	Mike O'Brien	KO	1 (4)	Dec 20, 1921	Broadway Auditorium, Buffalo, New York, U.S.	
2	Win	2–0	Joe Burns	TKO	1 (4)	Dec 7, 1921	Broadway Auditorium, Buffalo, New York, U.S.	
1	Win	1–0	Jack Casey	PTS	4	Nov 28, 1921	Broadway Auditorium, Buffalo, New York, U.S.	

=== Unofficial record ===
129 fights	114 wins	13 losses
By knockout	49	4
By decision	63	9
By disqualification	2	0
No contests	2	

Record with the inclusion of newspaper decisions in the win/loss/draw column.

No.	Result	Record	Opponent	Type	Round	Date	Location	Note
129	Win	114–13 (2)	Eddie Kaminski	DQ	5 (6)	Jun 19, 1934	Bison Stadium, Buffalo, New York, U.S.	
128	Win	113–13 (2)	Gus Flugel	KO	2 (6)	Jun 1, 1934	Bison Stadium, Buffalo, New York, U.S.	
127	Win	112–13 (2)	Walter Kugel	TKO	5 (6)	May 21, 1934	Broadway Auditorium, Buffalo, New York, U.S.	
126	Loss	111–13 (2)	Charley Belanger	TKO	2 (10)	Aug 22, 1932	Bison Stadium, Buffalo, New York, U.S.	
125	Win	111–12 (2)	Eddie Connors	PTS	4	Jun 7, 1932	Broadway Auditorium, Buffalo, New York, U.S.	
124	Loss	110–12 (2)	King Levinsky	PTS	10	Oct 30, 1931	Olympia Stadium, Detroit, Michigan, U.S.	
123	Loss	110–11 (2)	Maxie Rosenbloom	UD	15	Aug 5, 1931	Ebbets Field, Brooklyn, New York City, New York, U.S.	For NYSAC and The Ring light heavyweight titles
122	Win	110–10 (2)	Tom Heeney	PTS	6	Apr 20, 1931	Buffalo Auditorium, Buffalo, New York, U.S.	
121	Win	109–10 (2)	King Levinsky	PTS	10	Jan 14, 1931	Chicago Stadium, Chicago, Illinois, U.S.	
120	Loss	108–10 (2)	King Levinsky	SD	10	Nov 6, 1930	Chicago Stadium, Chicago, Illinois, U.S.	
119	NC	108–9 (2)	Len Darcy	NC	8 (10)	Sep 30, 1930	State Fair Coliseum, Syracuse, New York, U.S.	The crowd cheered when the referee finally called a halt to the contest
118	Win	108–9 (1)	Otis Gardner	KO	2 (10)	Aug 22, 1930	Arena, Schenectady, New York, U.S.	
117	Loss	107–9 (1)	Maxie Rosenbloom	SD	15	Jun 25, 1930	Bison Stadium, Buffalo, New York, U.S.	Lost NYSAC light heavyweight title; For vacant The Ring light heavyweight title
116	NC	107–8 (1)	Pete Latzo	NC	7 (10)	May 27, 1930	Boston Garden, Boston, Massachusetts, U.S.	After being jeered for seven rounds [both] were thrown out of the ring by referee Johnny Brassil
115	Win	107–8	Lou Scozza	MD	15	Feb 10, 1930	Broadway Auditorium, Buffalo, New York, U.S.	Won vacant NYSAC light heavyweight title
114	Win	106–8	Eddie Connors	TKO	2 (4)	Dec 23, 1929	Convention Hall, Rochester, New York, U.S.	
113	Win	105–8	Maxie Rosenbloom	MD	10	Nov 25, 1929	Broadway Auditorium, Buffalo, New York, U.S.	
112	Win	104–8	Johnny Haystack	KO	1 (6)	Nov 11, 1929	Broadway Auditorium, Buffalo, New York, U.S.	
111	Loss	103–8	Maxie Rosenbloom	PTS	10	Oct 14, 1929	Arena, Philadelphia, Pennsylvania, U.S.	
110	Win	103–7	Len Darcy	PTS	6	Sep 30, 1929	Broadway Auditorium, Buffalo, New York, U.S.	
109	Win	102–7	Len Darcy	NWS	10	Jul 2, 1929	North End Baseball Park, Steubenville, Ohio, U.S.	
108	Loss	101–7	James J. Braddock	TKO	9 (10)	Mar 11, 1929	Madison Square Garden, New York City, New York, U.S.	
107	Win	101–6	Len Darcy	PTS	6	Mar 4, 1929	Broadway Auditorium, Buffalo, New York, U.S.	
106	Win	100–6	Jimmy Mahoney	KO	3 (10)	Jan 21, 1929	Broadway Auditorium, Buffalo, New York, U.S.	
105	Win	99–6	Jimmy Mahoney	PTS	10	Dec 10, 1928	Broadway Auditorium, Buffalo, New York, U.S.	
104	Win	98–6	Vic McLaughlin	TKO	6 (10)	Nov 5, 1928	Cadle Tabernacle, Indianapolis, Indiana, U.S.	
103	Win	97–6	Otis Gardner	KO	2 (10)	Oct 29, 1928	Tacoma Skating Rink, Dayton, Kentucky, U.S.	
102	Win	96–6	Sergeant Jack Lynch	KO	2 (10)	Oct 8, 1928	Tacoma Skating Rink, Dayton, Kentucky, U.S.	
101	Win	95–6	Tony Marullo	PTS	10	Jun 18, 1928	Broadway Auditorium, Buffalo, New York, U.S.	
100	Win	94–6	Stanley Smith	KO	2 (10)	May 9, 1928	Seneca Junction Pavilion, Seneca Junction, New York, U.S.	
99	Win	93–6	Tony Marullo	PTS	10	Apr 30, 1928	113th Regiment Armory, Newark, New Jersey, U.S.	
98	Win	92–6	Billy Vidabeck	UD	10	Apr 23, 1928	Broadway Auditorium, Buffalo, New York, U.S.	
97	Win	91–6	Frankie Muskie	KO	3 (6)	Mar 19, 1928	Broadway Auditorium, Buffalo, New York, U.S.	
96	Loss	90–6	Tommy Loughran	MD	15	Dec 12, 1927	Madison Square Garden, New York City, New York, U.S.	Lost NBA light heavyweight title; For NYSAC and vacant The Ring light heavyweight titles
95	Win	90–5	Joe Lohman	PTS	10	Dec 2, 1927	Akron, Ohio, U.S.	
94	Win	89–5	Pat McCarthy	PTS	6	Nov 23, 1927	Broadway Auditorium, Buffalo, New York, U.S.	
93	Win	88–5	Murray Gitlitz	TKO	6 (10)	Nov 2, 1927	Broadway Auditorium, Buffalo, New York, U.S.	
92	Win	87–5	Maxie Rosenbloom	PTS	10	Aug 30, 1927	Velodrome, Hartford, Connecticut, U.S.	Won vacant NBA light heavyweight title
91	Win	86–5	Lew Chester	PTS	10	Apr 18, 1927	Broadway Auditorium, Buffalo, New York, U.S.	
90	Win	85–5	Johnny Risko	DQ	5 (6)	Mar 28, 1927	Broadway Auditorium, Buffalo, New York, U.S.	Risko DQ'ed for repeated low blows
89	Win	84–5	George Gemas	TKO	3 (6)	Mar 7, 1927	Broadway Auditorium, Buffalo, New York, U.S.	
88	Win	83–5	Ray Fay	PTS	6	Feb 21, 1927	Broadway Auditorium, Buffalo, New York, U.S.	
87	Win	82–5	Mike Wallace	PTS	10	Dec 13, 1926	Broadway Auditorium, Buffalo, New York, U.S.	
86	Win	81–5	Martin O'Grady	KO	2 (?)	Oct 25, 1926	Broadway Auditorium, Buffalo, New York, U.S.	
85	Win	80–5	Tom Burns	TKO	8 (10)	Oct 4, 1926	Broadway Auditorium, Buffalo, New York, U.S.	
84	Win	79–5	Jack Schoendorf	TKO	7 (10)	Sep 27, 1926	Coliseum Arena, Jamestown, New York, U.S.	
83	Win	78–5	Billy Britton	KO	1 (10)	Jul 30, 1926	Chadwick Park, Albany, New York, U.S.	
82	Win	77–5	Jackie Clark	PTS	10	Jul 8, 1926	Madison Square Garden, New York City, New York, U.S.	
81	Win	76–5	Jackie Clark	NWS	10	Jul 1, 1926	Playgrounds Stadium, West New York, New Jersey, U.S.	
80	Loss	75–5	Young Stribling	PTS	10	Mar 25, 1926	Madison Square Garden, New York City, New York, U.S.	
79	Win	75–4	Tommy Robson	PTS	10	Feb 1, 1926	Broadway Auditorium, Buffalo, New York, U.S.	
78	Win	74–4	Roland Todd	PTS	10	Jan 16, 1926	Mechanics Building, Boston, Massachusetts, U.S.	
77	Win	73–4	Tom Burns	NWS	10	Jan 13, 1926	Armory, Grand Rapids, Michigan, U.S.	
76	Win	72–4	Maxie Rosenbloom	PTS	10	Jan 1, 1926	Broadway Auditorium, Buffalo, New York, U.S.	
75	Win	71–4	Joe Burke	KO	3 (10)	Dec 23, 1925	Warren, Pennsylvania, U.S.	
74	Win	70–4	Noel McCormick	PTS	10	Dec 21, 1925	Broadway Auditorium, Buffalo, New York, U.S.	
73	Win	69–4	Patsy Motto	TKO	4 (10)	Dec 11, 1925	Arena, Syracuse, New York, U.S.	
72	Loss	68–4	Paul Berlenbach	TKO	11 (15)	Sep 11, 1925	Yankee Stadium, Bronx, New York City, New York, U.S.	For NBA, NYSAC, and The Ring light heavyweight titles
71	Win	68–3	Frank Carpenter	TKO	4 (10)	Sep 4, 1925	Bison Stadium, Buffalo, New York, U.S.	
70	Win	67–3	Maxie Rosenbloom	UD	6	Aug 22, 1925	Coney Island Stadium, Brooklyn, New York City, New York, U.S.	
69	Loss	66–3	Dave Shade	TKO	3 (10)	Jul 2, 1925	Polo Grounds, New York City, New York, U.S.	
68	Win	66–2	Billy Conley	TKO	6 (10)	Jun 22, 1925	Brassco Park, Waterbury, Connecticut, U.S.	
67	Win	65–2	Johnny Gill	PTS	10	Jun 9, 1925	Mechanics Building, Boston, Massachusetts, U.S.	
66	Win	64–2	Jack Burke	TKO	2 (6)	May 30, 1925	Yankee Stadium, Bronx, New York City, New York, U.S.	
65	Win	63–2	Jack MacDonald	KO	3 (6)	May 4, 1925	Broadway Auditorium, Buffalo, New York, U.S.	
64	Win	62–2	Billy McGowan	KO	2 (6)	Apr 20, 1925	Broadway Auditorium, Buffalo, New York, U.S.	
63	Win	61–2	Johnny Vascher	TKO	5 (6)	Apr 13, 1925	Lyceum Theatre, Ithaca, New York, U.S.	
62	Win	60–2	Augie Ratner	TKO	2 (10)	Mar 30, 1925	Mechanics Building, Boston, Massachusetts, U.S.	
61	Win	59–2	Mike Burke	KO	2 (6)	Mar 2, 1925	South Main Street Armory, Wilkes-Barre, Pennsylvania, U.S.	
60	Win	58–2	Jack Delaney	PTS	6	Feb 13, 1925	Madison Square Garden, New York City, New York, U.S.	
59	Win	57–2	Frankie Schoell	KO	3 (6)	Feb 2, 1925	Broadway Auditorium, Buffalo, New York, U.S.	
58	Win	56–2	Joe Lohman	PTS	6	Jan 21, 1925	Broadway Auditorium, Buffalo, New York, U.S.	
57	Win	55–2	Joe Eagan	KO	1 (6)	Jan 1, 1925	Broadway Auditorium, Buffalo, New York, U.S.	
56	Win	54–2	Jack Schoendorf	TKO	2 (6)	Dec 16, 1924	Broadway Auditorium, Buffalo, New York, U.S.	
55	Win	53–2	Vic McLaughlin	PTS	6	Dec 1, 1924	Broadway Auditorium, Buffalo, New York, U.S.	
54	Win	52–2	Jackie Clark	PTS	6	Nov 24, 1924	Convention Hall, Rochester, New York, U.S.	
53	Win	51–2	Norman Genet	PTS	6	Oct 27, 1924	Broadway Auditorium, Buffalo, New York, U.S.	
52	Win	50–2	Jack Delaney	PTS	6	Oct 3, 1924	Madison Square Garden, New York City, New York, U.S.	
51	Win	49–2	Sergeant Jack Lynch	UD	6	Sep 22, 1924	Bison Stadium, Buffalo, New York, U.S.	
50	Loss	48–2	Harry Greb	PTS	6	Sep 3, 1924	Bison Stadium, Buffalo, New York, U.S.	
49	Win	48–1	Kid Numbers	TKO	2 (10)	Jun 12, 1924	Queensboro Stadium, Long Island City, New York City, New York, U.S.	
48	Win	47–1	Sergeant Jack Lynch	PTS	6	Jun 9, 1924	Queensboro Stadium, Long Island City, New York City, New York, U.S.	
47	Win	46–1	Young Fisher	PTS	6	May 29, 1924	Arena, Syracuse, New York, U.S.	
46	Win	45–1	Jackie Clark	PTS	6	May 26, 1924	Broadway Auditorium, Buffalo, New York, U.S.	
45	Win	44–1	Harry Krohn	PTS	6	Apr 28, 1924	Broadway Auditorium, Buffalo, New York, U.S.	
44	Win	43–1	Pat Walsh	KO	2 (6)	Apr 14, 1924	Broadway Auditorium, Buffalo, New York, U.S.	
43	Win	42–1	Fay Keiser	KO	3 (6)	Mar 31, 1924	Broadway Auditorium, Buffalo, New York, U.S.	
42	Win	41–1	Nick Moon	KO	2 (6)	Mar 21, 1924	Arena, Syracuse, New York, U.S.	
41	Win	40–1	Young Stribling	PTS	6	Feb 25, 1924	Broadway Auditorium, Buffalo, New York, U.S.	
40	Win	39–1	Al Cross	TKO	3 (6)	Jan 18, 1924	Arena, Syracuse, New York, U.S.	
39	Loss	38–1	Joe Eagan	PTS	6	Jan 14, 1924	Broadway Auditorium, Buffalo, New York, U.S.	
38	Win	38–0	Nick Moon	PTS	6	Dec 17, 1923	Broadway Auditorium, Buffalo, New York, U.S.	
37	Win	37–0	Jim Lewis	KO	3 (12)	Nov 2, 1923	Erie, Pennsylvania, U.S.	
36	Win	36–0	Johnny Vascher	KO	2 (6)	Oct 29, 1923	Broadway Auditorium, Buffalo, New York, U.S.	
35	Win	35–0	Jack McFarland	UD	10	Oct 1, 1923	Arena, Toronto, Ontario, Canada	
34	Win	34–0	Johnny Klesch	UD	6	Sep 17, 1923	Broadway Auditorium, Buffalo, New York, U.S.	
33	Win	33–0	Wally Hinckle	KO	3 (6)	Aug 27, 1923	Broadway Auditorium, Buffalo, New York, U.S.	
32	Win	32–0	Jack Perry	UD	6	Jun 18, 1923	Broadway Auditorium, Buffalo, New York, U.S.	
31	Win	31–0	K.O. Willie Loughlin	KO	1 (6)	Jun 4, 1923	Broadway Auditorium, Buffalo, New York, U.S.	
30	Win	30–0	Johnny Griffiths	PTS	6	May 21, 1923	Broadway Auditorium, Buffalo, New York, U.S.	
29	Win	29–0	Jimmy Sullivan	PTS	6	May 7, 1923	Broadway Auditorium, Buffalo, New York, U.S.	
28	Win	28–0	Jakob "Soldier" Bartfield	PTS	6	Apr 23, 1923	Broadway Auditorium, Buffalo, New York, U.S.	
27	Win	27–0	Tony Saraco	UD	6	Apr 9, 1923	Broadway Auditorium, Buffalo, New York, U.S.	
26	Win	26–0	Al Cross	PTS	6	Mar 26, 1923	Broadway Auditorium, Buffalo, New York, U.S.	
25	Win	25–0	Jack Prybella	PTS	6	Mar 5, 1923	Broadway Auditorium, Buffalo, New York, U.S.	
24	Win	24–0	Ray Graham	PTS	6	Feb 19, 1923	Broadway Auditorium, Buffalo, New York, U.S.	
23	Win	23–0	Mixer Mitchell	PTS	6	Feb 5, 1923	Broadway Auditorium, Buffalo, New York, U.S.	
22	Win	22–0	Mixer Mitchell	PTS	6	Jan 22, 1923	Broadway Auditorium, Buffalo, New York, U.S.	
21	Win	21–0	Benny Ross	PTS	6	Jan 8, 1923	Broadway Auditorium, Buffalo, New York, U.S.	
20	Win	20–0	Sailor Max Hoffman	PTS	6	Dec 18, 1922	Broadway Auditorium, Buffalo, New York, U.S.	
19	Win	19–0	Jimmy Bova	TKO	5 (6)	Dec 8, 1922	Arena, Syracuse, New York, U.S.	
18	Win	18–0	Sam Willert	TKO	3 (6)	Nov 30, 1922	Broadway Auditorium, Buffalo, New York, U.S.	
17	Win	17–0	Al Linker	KO	3 (6)	Nov 10, 1922	Broadway Auditorium, Buffalo, New York, U.S.	
16	Win	16–0	K.O. Kelly	KO	2 (6)	Oct 16, 1922	Broadway Auditorium, Buffalo, New York, U.S.	
15	Win	15–0	Jack Prybella	PTS	4	Oct 2, 1922	Broadway Auditorium, Buffalo, New York, U.S.	
14	Win	14–0	Joe Cauvel	PTS	4	Sep 1, 1922	Broadway Auditorium, Buffalo, New York, U.S.	
13	Win	13–0	Buddy Merritt	PTS	4	Jul 24, 1922	Broadway Auditorium, Buffalo, New York, U.S.	
12	Win	12–0	Joey Joynt	PTS	4	Jul 3, 1922	Broadway Auditorium, Buffalo, New York, U.S.	
11	Win	11–0	Lee Bailey	PTS	6	Jun 23, 1922	Broadway Auditorium, Buffalo, New York, U.S.	
10	Win	10–0	Mike Peters	TKO	4 (?)	Jun 2, 1922	Convention Hall, Rochester, New York, U.S.	
9	Win	9–0	Jimmy Morris	KO	3 (4)	May 15, 1922	Convention Hall, Rochester, New York, U.S.	
8	Win	8–0	Tommy Sayers	PTS	4	Apr 24, 1922	Broadway Auditorium, Buffalo, New York, U.S.	
7	Win	7–0	Carl Dietz	TKO	2 (4)	Apr 18, 1922	Broadway Auditorium, Buffalo, New York, U.S.	
6	Win	6–0	Tommy Sayers	PTS	4	Mar 13, 1922	Broadway Auditorium, Buffalo, New York, U.S.	
5	Win	5–0	Tommy Sayers	KO	2 (4)	Feb 13, 1922	Broadway Auditorium, Buffalo, New York, U.S.	
4	Win	4–0	Joe Morey	PTS	4	Jan 2, 1922	Broadway Auditorium, Buffalo, New York, U.S.	
3	Win	3–0	Mike O'Brien	KO	1 (4)	Dec 20, 1921	Broadway Auditorium, Buffalo, New York, U.S.	
2	Win	2–0	Joe Burns	TKO	1 (4)	Dec 7, 1921	Broadway Auditorium, Buffalo, New York, U.S.	
1	Win	1–0	Jack Casey	PTS	4	Nov 28, 1921	Broadway Auditorium, Buffalo, New York, U.S.	

== Sources ==
- LIGHT HEAVY
- Blake, Rich. Slats: the Legend and Life of Jimmy Slattery. Buffalo, NY: No Frills Books, 2015.
- Tim Graham, "A good life scotched", Buffalo News 8-22-2006.
- Tim Graham, "Toast of the town", Buffalo News 8-20-2006.
- Tim Graham, "Ceremony to unveil Slattery Place", Buffalo News 8-22-2006.
- Terry Doran, "Fighting trim, 'Jimmytown', the ring of truth", Buffalo News 9-19-1997.
- "James E. Slattery III, worked in finance", Buffalo News 7-22-99, Obit.
- "Elizabeth A. Burgess, eloped with boxing champion", Buffalo News 1-26-98, Obit.

Achievements
Jack Delaney; Vacated	NBA Light Heavyweight Champion; August 30, 1927 – December 12, 1927	Succeeded by Tommy Loughran
Vacant Title last held by Tommy Loughran	NYSAC Light Heavyweight Champion; Feb 10, 1930 – June 25, 1930	Succeeded by Maxie Rosenbloom
