= Jack Kracken =

American boxer

Jack Kracken, born Emil Ecklund, was a Norwegian–American boxer of the 1930s. He was the first person to ever fight Joe Louis as a professional.

== Biography ==
Emil Ecklund was born on August 13, 1899, in Lillehammer in Oppland county, Norway. Ecklund emigrated from Gudbrandsdal to the United States. Emil Ecklund climbed into the ring under his real name and as Jack Kracken in a journeyman's career that lasted 17 professional boxing matches between 1930 and 1934.

In 1930, Ecklund dropped three consecutive matches in Illinois. On April 1, in Springfield, Illinois, he was knocked out in round three by George Kutulis, lost a six-round decision to Fred Caldori on April 25 in Chicago and suffered a technical knockout at the hands of King Levinsky on August 29 in Chicago. The losing streak stretched to four when Ecklund was KO'd by Walter Pickard on March 30, 1931, in Louisville, Kentucky.

From November 30, 1931, to November 2, 1932, Ecklund toured four Washington cities and Vancouver, British Columbia for a pair of wins over Sam Eisman and a victory over Jack Yenter. On December 2, 1932, in Bremerton, Washington, Battling Mix knocked down Ecklund five times. On February 13, 1933, Ecklund defeated Chick McBride in rounds two and three at the Bremerton Athletic Club and subsequently in Silverdale, Washington, on February 23, 1933.

Jack Kracken is best remembered as the first boxer defeated by Joe Louis on July 4, 1934, in the first round of a scheduled six-round bout at Bacon Casino on Chicago's South Side. Kracken was one of Chicago's top heavyweights at the time he fought Louis. It was Kracken's last appearance in the ring. Jack Kracken finished his career with 10 wins (all by knockout) and 7 losses.
