= Art Lasky =

American boxer (1909–1980)

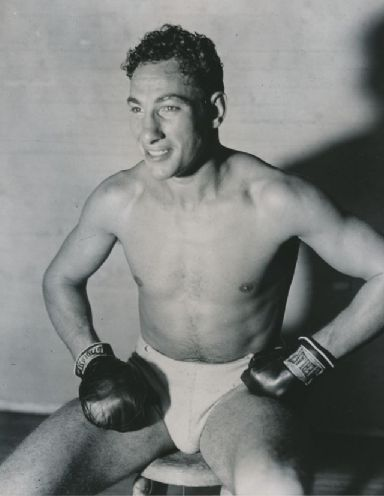
- Lasky in 1934

Personal information
- Nationality: American
- Born: Arthur Lakofsky; November 16, 1908 Evansville, Minnesota, U.S.
- Died: April 2, 1980 (aged 70) San Bernardino, California, U.S.
- Height: 6 ft 4 in (1.93 m)
- Weight: Heavyweight

Boxing career
- Reach: 76 in (193 cm)
- Stance: orthodox

Boxing record
- Total fights: 59
- Wins: 44
- Win by KO: 34
- Losses: 9
- Draws: 6
- No contests: 0

Arthur Lakofsky (November 16, 1909 – April 2, 1980), also known as Art Lasky, was a heavyweight professional boxer from Minneapolis, Minnesota.

== Personal life ==
Lasky was born in 1908 in Saint Paul, Minnesota, and called Minneapolis his home. His parents were Jewish emigrants from Lithuania. Both he and his brother Maurice worked in a scrap metal yard before taking up boxing. His brothers Dave and Eli both had short, but less successful careers as boxers during the depression years of the 1930s. Lasky's brother Maurice acted as his trainer, and trained the boxer Young Harry Greb for a time.

After his boxing career ended, Lasky went on to become a cameraman, stunt coordinator, and even dabbled in acting. Being a bit of a renaissance man, and always interested in new challenges, he had a short career in the Palm Springs police department, and later became a physical therapist with a practice in three California cities; San Bernardino, then Palm Springs, and later at his home in Sky Valley, thirteen miles from Hot Springs. Lasky was also skilled in carpentry, masonry and as a surveyor and did much of the work for a home he built in California around 1964 after his boxing retirement.

His son Aron was born in 1960, and his daughter Lana was born in 1964 from his third marriage to wife Irma.

== Professional career ==
Lasky made his professional debut with a knockout of Percy Cameron in May 1930. He faced his first notable opponent, Jimmy Gibbons of Saint Paul, on January 8, 1931, knocking the 28-0-2 Gibbons unconscious in the second round. Gibbons was down twice in the second from Lasky's left hooks. The round ended when Lasky' blows knocked Gibbons to the mat. He was completely out when the referee reached the count of six, and Gibbons's manager threw in the towel making the victory a technical knockout.

Lasky remained undefeated until his 16th bout, a newspaper decision loss to Dick Daniels, also of Minneapolis. He bounced back, however, and by September 1932 was sporting a 14–1 record when he faced Primo Carnera, one of his first rated opponents, in Saint Paul.

=== Meeting Primo Carnera and Joe Sekyra, 1932 ===
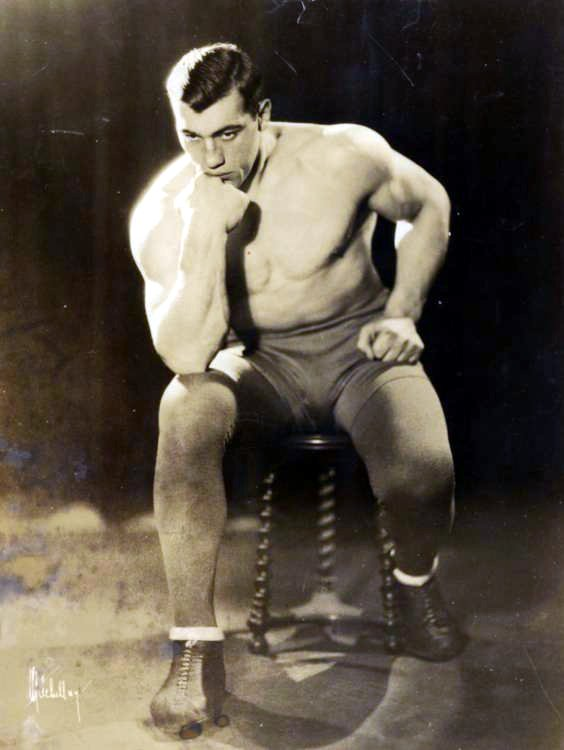
Primo Carnera

Future World Heavyweight Champion Primo Carnera defeated Lasky in a ten-round newspaper decision in St. Paul on September 1, 1932. The loss appeared to do nothing to hamper Lasky's career but it was a brutal battle, as were many of Lasky's fights. In an odd spectacle of a fight, Lasky, at 188, was outweighed 78 pounds by the Italian giant, though Carnera had only a one-inch height advantage at 6' 5". The fight did not feature continuous blows by either boxer until the eighth round, and the decision was a close one according to one reporter. In the final rounds, the Italian giant's strength proved too great for Lasky.

Lasky became the first opponent to knock out Joe Sekyra in a brutal battle at the Auditorium in Minneapolis on November 29, 1932. The knockout, occurring one minute into the seventh round, came after Lasky's strong right to the chin and two powerful hooks to the jaw of his opponent. Earlier in the bout, Seykra reached Lasky with strong blows to the body and chin, but Lasky was able to fight on. The bout featured blows from both boxers landing almost continuously from the opening bell. Jack Blackburn, an exceptional Black lightweight, trained and seconded Lasky for the bout. Lasky started a strong offensive attack in the second round, and in the third, Sekyra retaliated with strong blows to the chin. Lasky took the fourth round with lighting lefts from a distance, and an occasional right to the chin. On the advice of Blackburn, he opened the sixth with a rapid two-handed attack that rocked his opponent who managed to stay on his feet. Showing determination, though exhausted, Seykra attempted a comeback by the end of the round. Pushing his advantage in the seventh, Lasky doubled his efforts and achieved the knock out. The win was one of the most convincing of his career, coming against a recognized heavyweight contender.

Lasky immediately embarked on a six fight winning streak, including a fifth-round knockout of Black heavyweight Tiger Jack Fox, a boxer with a 50–5 record, at Chicago Stadium in Illinois. He achieved the fifth-round knockout with a hard right to the jaw of the black boxer. Fox attempted to rise at the count of nine, but fell to his feet. His win over the well known opponent spotlighted Lasky as a fighter to watch.

On March 31, 1933, in his first appearance at Madison Square Garden, the shrine of East coast boxing, Lasky pounded out an eight-round points decision against Hans Birkle, a competent 6' 1" German-born heavyweight. The bout was a semi-final and drew a sizable crowd of 9,000. Lasky put reach advantage and speed to good use against his opponent.

=== First injury to right eye, 1933 ===
On May 12, 1933, Charley Retzlaff scored a six-round technical knockout against Lasky in their first State Heavyweight Championship bout at the Auditorium in St. Paul. Retzlaff's right cross and jabs landed too frequently against his opponent. A blow by Retzlaff in the second round first opened a cut on Lasky's right eye, greatly hindering his chances in the remaining rounds. A few of Retzlaff's blows again targeted the injured eye in the fifth and sixth rounds. At the end of the sixth, with Lasky staggering and unable to defend himself, the referee called the fight ending the bout. Lasky was hospitalized after the fight for several injuries, but primarily to close a severe cut above his right eye which was affecting his vision. Loss of vision would be the deciding factor in ending his career in 1939.

Lasky moved to California in 1933, and became a regular at two large boxing venues, Olympic Stadium in Los Angeles and Legion Stadium in Hollywood.

On December 1, 1933, Lasky put away Fred Lenhart in the third round of a bout at Legion Stadium, part of a 15-fight unbeaten streak that lasted until the fall of 1934. Lasky led in the first two rounds. After a nine count by a strong left in the third, Lasky delivered a telling right to end the Lenhart fight. Lasky had a six-inch height advantage in the bout which gave him an advantage at long range. Lenhart would fight some of the best heavyweight boxers of the 1930s including Tiger Jack Fox and Hall of Fame light heavyweight champion John Henry Lewis

On February 20, 1934, Lasky scored a "smashing triumph" in a five-round technical knockout against Los Angeles heavyweight Benny Miller at Olympic Auditorium in Los Angeles before a crowd of 10,000. Lasky enjoyed a fourteen-pound weight advantage over his opponent. Miller's handlers threw in the towel after he suffered two knockdowns in the fifth. Miller was down twice in the second round before his seconds threw in the towel. The fight helped Lasky obtain a match with Steve Hamas.

Lasky achieved a top ten rating as a World Heavyweight Contender in 1934. On March 20, 1934, Lasky won a ten-round points decision against Steve Ramage at Madison Square Garden. As Ramage had finished stronger in the ninth and tenth, the partisan crowd of 11,000 booed the decision, but Lasky's strong showing in the early rounds, particularly the seventh, gave him the decision by a shade. The Associated Press scored the battle a draw at five rounds apiece. The win moved Lasky into boxing's top ten ratings.

=== Loss to Steve Hamas, 1934 ===
Lasky's winning ways came to a screeching halt, however, with a close ten round split decision loss to Steve Hamas at Madison Square Garden on October 5, 1934. The bout had great importance for the future of Lasky's career, as it was an elimination match to find an opponent for reigning World Heavyweight Champion Max Baer. A penalty for a backhanded punch in the fourth round may have been the only thing standing in the way of Lasky becoming a top contender for the heavyweight title. In a twist of fate, Lasky's manager appealed the back-hand penalty to the New York Boxing Commission and won, but the decision for Hamas was never reversed.

Lasky had Hamas close to knockout in both the third and ninth rounds, but the bell saved his opponent from a loss. Hamas took a terrible thrashing in the third round but made a comeback to win. In a close decision, no judge gave Hamas more than six rounds, and at least one considered the fight even. Hamas considered himself lucky to have won the bout, though Lasky suffered in the bout as well, as the blows reigned continuously on both sides throughout the fighting and the decision was a close one.

=== James J. Braddock and King Levinsky fights, 1934 ===
On June 12, 1934, Lasky had his first bout with Jewish heavyweight Chicagoan King Levinsky before 9000 roaring fans at Olympic Auditorium in Los Angeles, where Levinsky fell in 10 rounds by a unanimous decision. Levinsky, who was not known for boxing ringcraft, was groggy in the eighth and again in the tenth from the superior speed and technique of Lasky, who won decisively by the tenth round. The referee gave seven rounds to Lasky, with only two to Levinsky. The bout was an important win against a rated heavyweight opponent.

In late 1934, Lasky began a losing streak that included losses to heavyweight contenders Jim Braddock and Charley Retzlaff as well as a draw with fellow Jewish heavyweight contender King Levinsky.

His second bout with Levinsky at Chicago Stadium ended in a ten-round draw on November 23, 1934. One reporter credited the draw to Lasky's strong rally in the tenth, noting that the Minneapolis boxer fought closely in the early rounds. Lasky may have had a better showing against his well known opponent if not for penalties he received in two rounds for low blows. Though his boxing technique was primitive, Levinsky broke the top ten for heavyweight rankings, and was a top money earner as he fought quality competition. The draw showed that Lasky could perform well against top ten contenders. Lasky had beaten Levinsky five months earlier in a ten-round unanimous decision at Olympic Stadium in Los Angeles.

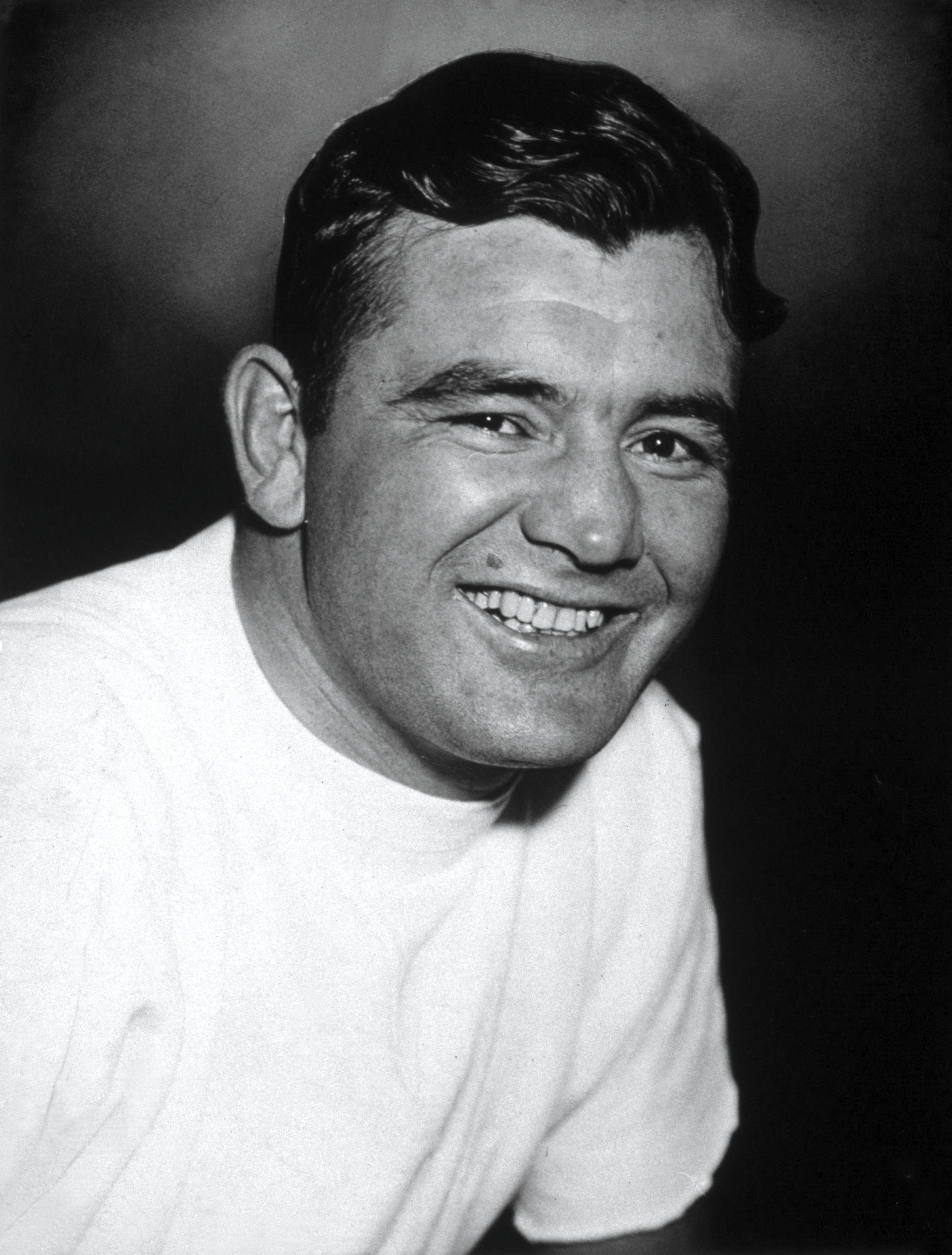
James Braddock, Heavyweight Champion

In a fight that could have put him in line for a Heavyweight Championship bout with Max Baer, Lasky was the early betting favorite at 3-1. His opponent Jim Braddock had just begun his comeback after a nine-month layoff and a period on the depression's relief rolls. The financial boon to Braddock for winning would be $4,100 at the height of the depression. The break from boxing, rather than making him stale, had given Braddock time to strengthen his body, improve his technique, and heal his hands, which had given him trouble before his layoff as a result of repeated breaks in the bones. In contrast, Lasky had fought on a regular basis, averaging monthly bouts for his previous five years of boxing. Lasky's brother trained him while Braddock's trainers included Ray Arcel. The New York Times described Lasky's classic bout with Braddock on March 22, 1935, as "a savage grueling struggle that thrilled a crowd of 11,000 onlookers". Lasky fought a "gallant" and "courageous" fight from the first bell to the last, but Braddock's strong right landed too hard and too often. Both boxers had a reach of 76 inches, making reach of no significance in the fight. Both boxers were within a year of the same age, though Braddock had been boxing professionally around nine years, to Lasky's five. Most telling, Braddock had just won in an upset against the more competitive opponent John Henry Lewis already a World Light Heavyweight Champion, as well as against Martin Levandowski. Another significant factor were previous injuries to Lasky in rough bouts that may have affected his conditioning and speed, particularly his previous loss to Charlie Retzlaff on May 12, 1933, when he was hospitalized for an injury to his right eye, and very likely affected his depth perception in later fights. The incredibly strong heavyweight Primo Carnera whom Lasky had met on September 1, 1932, pounded Lasky's body in the final rounds. In his recent loss to Steve Hamas, only five months earlier, Lasky likely absorbed more punishment than described by the reporters of the day as both men were heavyweights, and the fight was described by one source as "a smashing brawl", implying continuous action throughout the bout. Though Lasky was only two years older than Hamas, those two years had been filled with punishing bouts. Even in many of his wins, Lasky absorbed punishment, taking five rounds to knock out the hard hitting Tiger Jack Fox on May 3, 1933, in Chicago. Losing the fifteen round bout by a unanimous decision of the judges, the Braddock fight spotlighted Lasky as a heavyweight contender who could not quite reach the pinnacle of his weight class. Braddock was credited with eleven of fifteen rounds, and Lasky suffered one of the "worst beatings of his life", according to one source. Lasky was awarded one of his four rounds by the judges from a foul credited to Braddock. The sixth and the eleventh round bells may have prevented him from more serious injury or a knock out. Once again Lasky took a very hard beating in a close bout from a highly ranked competitor. His loss to Braddock effectively ended Lasky's hopes of a World Heavyweight title. Three months later, Braddock became Heavyweight Champion, defeating Max Baer in fifteen rounds.

On June 21, 1935, Lasky lost to Ford Smith in a technical knockout, 2:30 into the sixth round. Once again, a repaired cut above Lasky's eye was torn open by repeated blows from Smith in the third or fourth round, affecting his vision. Most reporters wrote that the cut was above the left eye, and Lasky had already seriously injured his right in his first bout with Charles Retzlaff. Impressively, Lasky may have held a slight lead in points scoring over the first three rounds. The fourth round was even, but in the fifth, Smith mounted a fierce body attack. The eye injury and beating left Lasky weak and unable to score sufficient points against his opponent in the final three rounds. Perhaps indicating vision loss, one reporter wrote, "Harder punches scored by Smith gave him the initial round, while Lasky was unable to find the range and missed regularly." His missed blows may have been from bleeding into the eye, previous vision loss, or both. The loss ultimately removed Lasky's chances of a rematch with Jim Braddock for the World Heavyweight Championship. Lasky was a 3-1 favorite in pre-fight betting.

=== Minnesota state title attempt, 1935 ===
On September 19, 1935, Lasky began a down slide losing to Charley Retzlaff in a ten-round technical knockout at the Auditorium in St. Paul. Lasky came close to a knockout in several rounds from Retzlaff's continuous, powerful right, and was down in the tenth for a count of three. The contest was billed as the Minnesota State Heavyweight Title.

On January 17, 1936, Lasky lost to Jack Roper in a technical knockout 1:32 into the first round at Legion Stadium in Hollywood. Lasky had been down twice from hard left jabs before the final knockout.

On January 28, 1936, Lasky defeated Bob Cook by technical knockout :50 seconds into the second round in San Jose, California. In the second round, Cook was knocked down three times and the referee stopped the bout.

On April 9, 1936, Lasky faced Joe Bauer at Hollywood Stadium, winning in a ten-round points decision. Needing a win to end his losing streak, Lasky was not favored in the pre-game betting. He took six of the ten rounds, with Bauer holding a slight lead in two, and the rest tied. Bauer had only been fighting as a professional for a few years. With a knockdown from a broken nose in the second round, Bauer had little chance of success, and Lasky staggered him with body blows in the fifth and the eighth.

On May 15, 1936, Art Lasky lost a seventh-round technical knockout against Jack Roper in a second meeting at Legion Stadium, 1:47 into the seventh round. Roper was bleeding badly and his right eye was closed. Roper's handlers stopped the fight before the eighth round bell.

== Career ending eye injury, June 1936 ==
Lasky fell from top contender status, but continued to fight frequently. On June 30, 1936, he met Johnny Paycheck at Olympic Stadium in Los Angeles. Though Lasky won the fight 1:40 into the fourth round by technical knockout, he suffered a detached retina which hastened his retirement from boxing and caused blindness in his right eye. Lasky later told his son, he believed Paycheck had thumbed him in the right eye and that he had immediately lost his vision in the bout. He had initially suffered an injury to the right eye in his first bout with Charley Retzlaff in St. Paul on May 12, 1933. After retiring from boxing he underwent surgeries and was able to restore partial sight in the eye.

Lasky sat out all of 1937. He fought twice more in 1938, with both fights ending in draws, and finished his career with a loss to Nathan Mann New Haven, Connecticut, in a third-round technical knockout on January 9, 1939.

== Movie career ==
After retirement from boxing in 1939, Lasky appeared in several movies, often as a boxer or a boxing adviser. His work included "The Duke Comes Back" (1937), "The Contender" (1944), and "The Navy Way" (1944). In "The Duke Comes Back", he acted as a technical adviser for fight scenes and had a credited role as the character Joe Bronski. Based on Lucian Cary's novel The Duke Comes Back, the movie tells the story of an ex-prizefighter who returns to the ring to help his father-in-law who has money problems. In "The Navy Way" (1944), he had a credited role as a fighter. He had several additional uncredited roles in 1937 in "Nothing Sacred" (1937), and in the Western movie, "Western Gold" (1937).

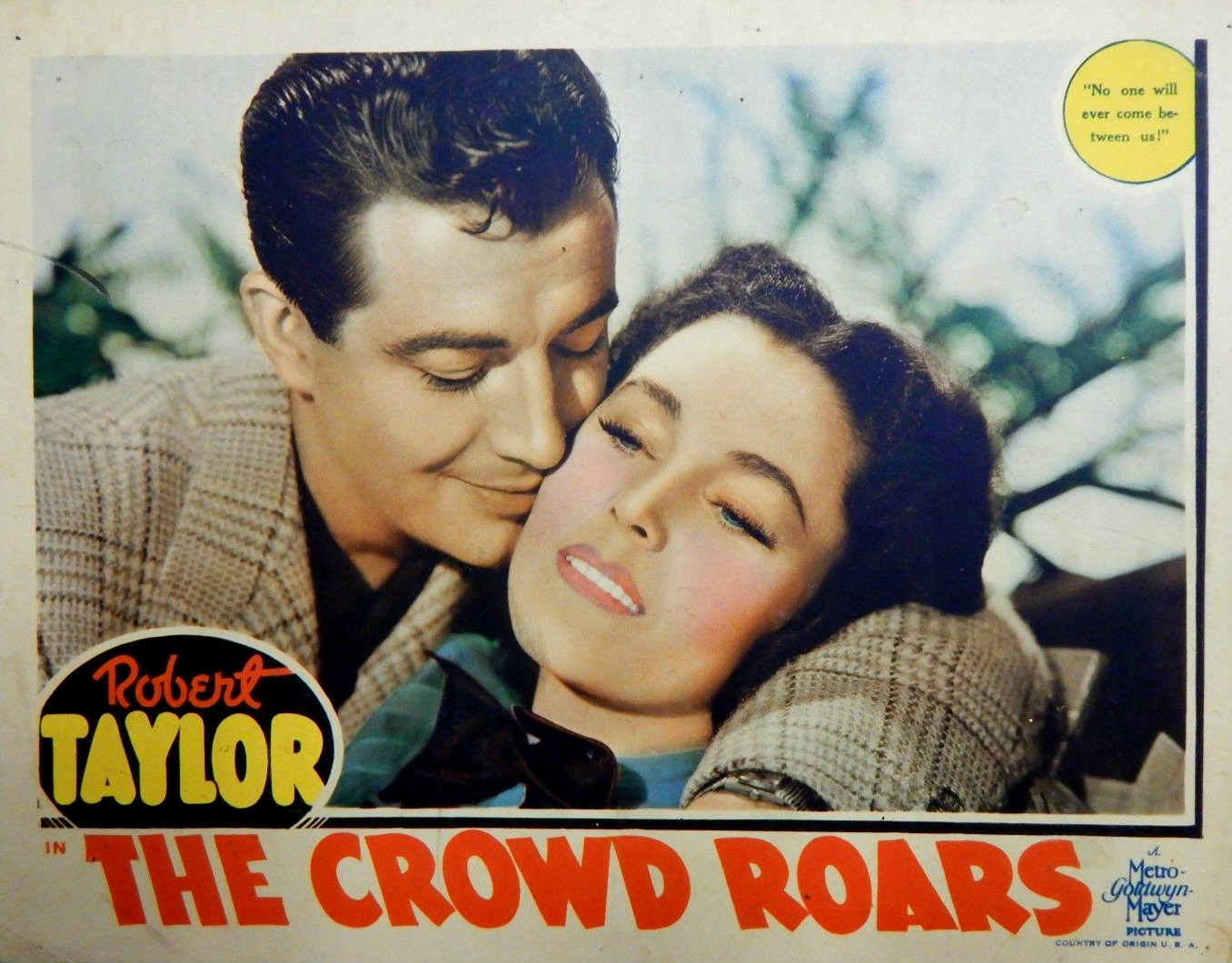
The Crowd Roars, (1938)

In the successful boxing movie, The Crowd Roars(1938), starring Robert Taylor and Maureen O'Sullivan, he appeared in an uncredited role as a second, to the fighter McAvoy. The plot involves Robert Taylor as a boxer who boxes a friend of his and kills him in the ring. The movie featured nearly twenty mostly uncredited boxers, primarily in background scenes with little or no dialogue. Included in the cast were boxer turned actor Maxie Rosenbloom, Panamanian champion Abe Hollandersky with a featured close up, and boxing stand out Jimmy McLarnin. McLarnin was perhaps the greatest boxer of the thirties and a multiple world weight class champion in welter and jr. lightweight divisions.

In one of his later movies, "The Contender" (1944), he worked as a technical adviser for the fight scenes. The plot featured Buster Crabbe as a man who rises from the amateur ranks to become a professional boxer and contends for the world heavyweight championship. He faces challenges from the temptations of a woman played by Rita Langdon who introduces him to the world of nightclubs, late hours and drinking, and turns him from a more virtuous Linda Martin played by Arline Judge, a newspaper reporter who has eyes for him.

According to his son Aron, twenty years after his boxing career ended in 1970, Lasky's mental acuity and control of his personal finances began to unravel. He died in San Bernardino, California, on April 2, 1980, in a nursing home. He was buried in Norwalk, California, fifty miles west of his home in San Bernardino. The movie "Cinderella Man" highlighted the pivotal fight with Jimmy Braddock that secured the title fight for Jimmy with Max Baer. Art was played by Mark Simmons in the movie.

== Selected fights ==
13 Wins, 9 Losses, 1 Draw
| Result | Opponent(s) | Date | Location | Duration | Notes |
| Win | Sam Baker | May 1930 | | 1st Round KO | Boxing Debut |
| Win | Jimmy Gibbons | Jan 8, 1931 | Minneapolis | 2nd Round TKO | Gibbons down from 2 left hooks |
| Loss | Dick Daniels | Jan 18, 1932 | Minneapolis | 10 Round News. Dec. | Loss broke a long winning streak |
| Loss | Primo Carnera | Sep 1, 1932 | St. Paul | 10 Round News. Dec. | Future World heavy champ |
| Loss | Primo Carnera | Sep 1, 1932 | St. Paul | 10 Round News. Dec. | Future World heavy champ |
| Loss | Joe Sekyra | Nov 29, 1932 | Minneapolis | 7th Round KO | Sekyra-Major heavy contender |
| Win | Hans Birkie | Mar 31, 1933 | Mad. Sq. Garden | 8 Rounds | |
| Win | Tiger Jack Fox | May 3, 1933 | Chicago Stadium | 5th Round KO | Fox- 50-5 Record |
| Loss | Charlie Retzlaff | May 12, 1933 | St. Paul | 6th Round TKO | For Minnes. State Heavy title Injury to right eye |
| Win | Fred Lenhart | Dec 1, 1933 | Hollywood | 3rd Round KO | |
| Win | Andy Mitchell | Dec 18, 1933 | Hollywood | 1st Round KO | |
| Win | Jack Van Noy | Dec 29, 1933 | Hollywood | 5th Round KO | |
| Win | Tom Patrick | Jan 12, 1934 | Hollywood | 3rd Round KO | |
| Win | Billy Donohoe | Jan 26, 1934 | Hollywood | 5th Round KO | |
| Win | Benny Miller | Feb 20, 1934 | Los Angeles | 5th Round TKO | |
| Win | Lee Ramage | Mar 20, 1934 | Los Angeles | 10 Round | Helped obtain fight with Hamas |
| Win | King Levinsky | Jun 12, 1934 | Los Angeles | 10 Round UD | |
| Loss | Steve Hamas | Oct 5, 1934 | Mad. Sq. Garden, NY | 10 Round SD | |
| *Draw* | King Levinsky | Nov 23, 1934 | Chicago Stadium | 10 Rounds | |
| Loss | Jim Braddock | Mar 22, 1935 | Mad. Sq. Garden, NY | 15 Round UD | Braddock-Future Heavy champ |
| Loss | Charley Retzlaff | Sep 19, 1935 | St. Paul | 10 Round TKO | For Minnesota St. Heavy title |
| Win | Joe Bauer | Apr 9, 1936 | Hollywood, CA | 10 Round | |
| Loss | Johnny Paycheck | Jun 30, 1936 | Loss Angeles, CA | 5th Round TKO | Suffered detached retina |

== Boxing honors ==
On October 2, 2001, Art Lasky was inducted into the Minnesota Boxing Hall of Fame.
