= Roxana Sand =

American erotic dancer (born c.1916)

Roxana Sand (also known as Roxanne Carmine, née Golda Glickman) (born c.1916) was an erotic dancer and fan dancer whose performance at Minsky's Burlesque, in August 1936, resulted in a crackdown on burlesque shows in New York City. She was one of five dancers who performed strip-tease acts, which led to the conviction of Sam Krauss, manager of the Gotham Theatre, East 125th Street (Manhattan), for giving an indecent performance. The theatre was owned by Abe Minsky. Minsky's was soon closed along with other burlesque venues by protests from citizen's groups and the reform administration of Mayor Fiorello LaGuardia.

She was one of fourteen defense witnesses in the court proceeding in which Krauss was found guilty. Two of her fellow dancers, Muriel Lord and Jewel Southern, gave testimony which attested that each was properly clothed while performing. Sand chased a newspaper photographer up three flights of stairs at the New York City courthouse at the conclusion of the trial, because he had taken her photo. She stopped her pursuit only after someone hurled a used flashbulb at her feet, which exploded with a loud boom.

== Married to boxer ==
Sand was the ex-wife of boxer King Levinsky. In September 1934 she asked for a divorce on grounds of cruelty. She had been married to Levinsky for only five weeks.
