= Cornelis O'Kelly =

British boxer (1907–1968)

Personal information
- Nationality: British
- Born: 11 March 1907; Kingston upon Hull, England
- Died: 8 September 1968 (aged 61); Stockport, England

Sport
- Sport: Boxing

Cornelis O'Kelly (11 March 1907 – 8 September 1968) was a British boxer. He competed in the men's heavyweight event at the 1924 Summer Olympics. He later became a priest.
