= Art Sykes =

American boxer

Arthur S. Sykes, (July 3, 1913 - January 24, 1996), known as Artie, was an American boxer from Elmira, New York. Sykes made his professional debut in 1933. In 1934, he was defeated by a young Joe Louis. Later in his career, he lost to Hall of Famer Jersey Joe Walcott. Sykes retired in 1941. He won 18 career fights, lost 23, and had one draw. In 1938, he also won a bout in Trenton, New Jersey, against Johnny Briggs, decided by a consensus of attending sportswriters.
