= Charley Retzlaff =

American boxer

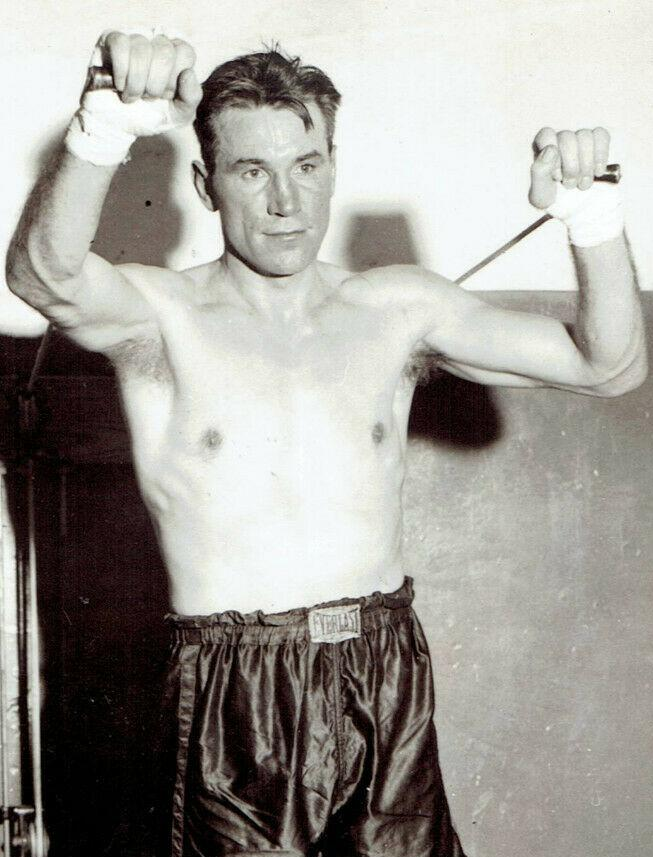
Retzlaff in 1936

Charley Retzlaff, alias The Duluth Dynamiter (October 28, 1904 – June 4, 1970) was an American heavyweight professional boxer from Duluth, Minnesota, United States.

== Personal life ==
Retzlaff was born in Leonard, North Dakota.

== Professional career ==
Retzlaff made his professional debut with a second-round knockout of Herman Raschke in March 1929. Retzlaff remained undefeated through his first 23 bouts, losing for the first time by disqualification against Antonio de la Mata in Chicago in November 1930. Retzlaff would avenge that loss with a first-round knockout in a rematch one month later. 11 more wins followed before Retzlaff suffered his next loss, to 41-23-5 Joe Sekyra in September 1931. More wins would follow, and Retzlaff carried a record of 38-2-1 into a match with fellow Minnesotan Dick Daniels. Retzlaff scored three knockdowns and a first-round knockout en route to winning the vacant Minnesota State Heavyweight Title. This title would be defended in May 1933 and again in September 1935 against Art Lasky.

Of Retzlaff, famed sportswriter Damon Runyon would say "[He is] the best-looking heavyweight prospect that has bobbed up in a long time," and "[Retzlaff is the] best of the new heavyweights. He’s got what it takes. I haven’t seen a fighter in a long time who has impressed me so favorably." At the end of 1935 Retzlaff was ranked by Ring Magazine among the top ten heavyweight boxers in the world.

In January 1936 Retzlaff lost by first-round knockout to a young prospect named Joe Louis. In his final defense of the Minnesota heavyweight title Retzlaff could manage only a draw against 17-9 Arne Andersson.

Retzlaff retired afterwards, having compiled a career record of 64-8-3 with 54 wins by knockout. He returned to the family farm near Leonard, ND in 1940. In 1950 he opened an automobile dealership in Detroit Lakes, MN and died in that town in 1970. He and his wife are buried in Leonard, ND. Charley Retzlaff was inducted into the Minnesota Boxing Hall of Fame in 2015.
