= Maxie Rosenbloom =

American boxer and actor (1907–1976)

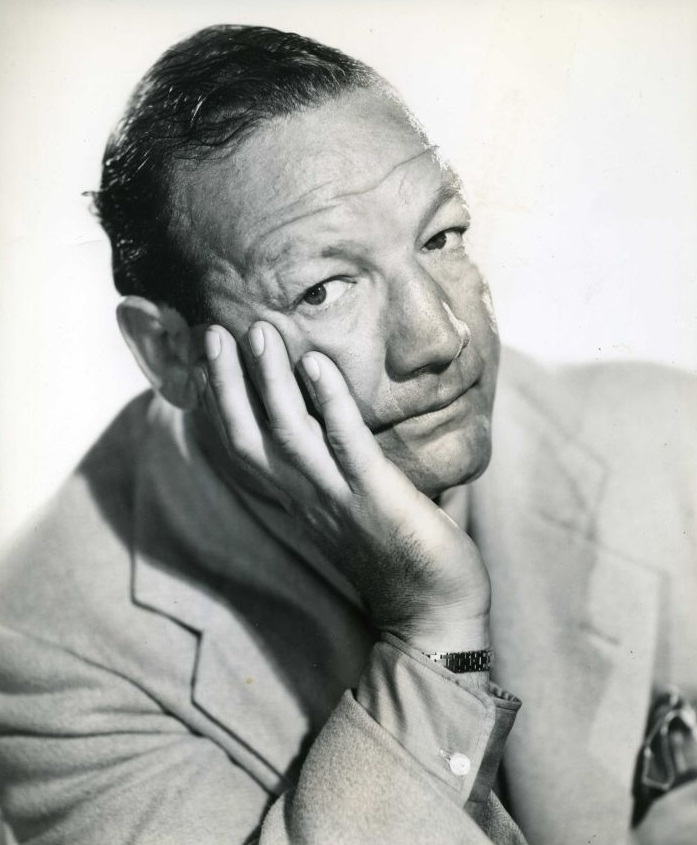
- Rosenbloom in 1941

Personal information
- Nickname: Slapsy Maxie
- Born: Max Everitt Rosenbloom; November 6, 1906 Leonard Bridge, Connecticut, U.S.
- Died: March 6, 1976 (aged 69) South Pasadena, California, U.S.
- Weight: Middleweight; Light heavyweight; Heavyweight

Boxing career
- Stance: Orthodox

Boxing record
- Total fights: 298; with the inclusion of newspaper decisions
- Wins: 223
- Win by KO: 19
- Losses: 44
- Draws: 29
- No contests: 2

Max Everitt Rosenbloom (November 6, 1906 – March 6, 1976) was an American professional boxer, actor, and television personality. Nicknamed "Slapsy Maxie", he was inducted into The Ring's Boxing Hall of Fame in 1972, the International Jewish Sports Hall of Fame in 1984, the World Boxing Hall of Fame in 1985, the International Boxing Hall of Fame in 1993., and the National Jewish Sports Hall of Fame and Museum in 2026. He was sometimes billed as Slapsy Maxie Rosenbloom for film appearances.

== Early life and boxing career ==
Rosenbloom was born in Leonard Bridge, Connecticut. As a professional boxer, Rosenbloom relied on hitting and moving to score points. He was very difficult to hit cleanly with a power punch and his fights often went the distance. His open-gloved style earned him the nickname "Slapsie Maxie". The many punches he received to the head eventually led to the deterioration of his motor functions, giving his nickname a second level of meaning.

Legendary trainer Cus D'Amato later recalled that watching Rosenbloom's ring performances inspired him to attempt to create a perfect fighter, developing a unique boxing technique, later known as the peek-a-boo:

Rosenbloom was probably the cleverest fighter I've ever seen, defensively. You just couldn't hit the man. He developed a sort of a radar, a sense of anticipation of blows, and ability to react to that, and act on it.

== Light Heavyweight Champion ==
On June 25, 1930, Rosenbloom won the NYSAC and vacant Ring Magazine light heavyweight titles when he faced off against Jimmy Slattery at Bison Stadium for the undisputed title. Slattery, being the reigning NYSAC champion and Rosenbloom being listed by some sources as the incumbent NBA light heavyweight champion. Since the fight was between the number one and number two fighters in the division, the vacant The Ring light heavyweight title was also on the line. He reigned as the NYSAC and Ring magazine champion until he was defeated by Bob Olin on November 16, 1934. Throughout his reign, he made 7 defenses of his titles and held the undisputed crown two separate times as he had been stripped by the National Boxing Association, a title which he was awarded outside the ring in September 1930 during the NBA's yearly meeting. On June 6, 1931, Rosenbloom was stripped for failing to defend the title in a timely manner. After being stripped in 1931, he went on to continue defending his NYSAC and Ring titles, eventually defeating Bob Godwin via fourth-round technical knockout in Madison Square Garden on March 24, 1933. His second reign as the undisputed champion was just as short lived. He was subsequently stripped by the National Boxing Association on September 17, 1934, during their annual meeting. "The delegates ruled that Maxie Rosenbloom, generally recognized as champion of the class, had violated every law of boxing by his slapping and flicking tactics in the ring."

== Films, radio, and television ==
In 1937, two years before he announced his permanent retirement from boxing, Rosenbloom accepted a role in a Hollywood film. He became a character actor, usually portraying comical or sympathetic "big guys" in movies such as Each Dawn I Die starring James Cagney and George Raft. He continued acting in films as well as on radio and television, where he again portrayed big, clumsy, often punch-drunk-but-lovable characters. In 1950 producer-director Jules White hired Rosenbloom to team with another veteran champ, Max Baer, for a brief series of slapstick-comedy short subjects. The Baer & Rosenbloom shorts were released by Columbia Pictures through 1952, and reissued to theaters in 1959–60. In 1955 Rosenbloom was featured in Abbott and Costello Meet the Keystone Kops.

Maxie Rosenbloom appeared as himself in a number of radio episodes of The Fred Allen Show, including in a skit with Marlene Dietrich. He was also cast in an important part in television's first 90-minute drama, Requiem for a Heavyweight. Written by Rod Serling and starring Jack Palance, Keenan Wynn and Ed Wynn, that teleplay presents the story of a boxer at the end of his career. Rosenbloom portrays a character whose life revolves around his retelling old boxing stories night after night to other ex-boxers who gather in a down-and-out bar. That life looms as the same fate for "Mountain" McClintock (Palance's character) if he cannot adjust to a new way of life outside the ring.

Slapsy Maxie's, Rosenbloom's nightclub, is prominently featured in a 2013 crime film, Gangster Squad, which is set in 1949. The original club operated in San Francisco. The club moved to 7165 Beverly Blvd in Los Angeles. From 1943 to 1947 it was located at 5665 Wilshire Blvd.

== Death ==
Rosenbloom died of Paget's disease of bone on March 6, 1976, at age 69, at the Braewood Convalescent Hospital in South Pasadena, California. He is interred at the Valhalla Memorial Park Cemetery in North Hollywood, California.

== Accolades ==
- The Ring Boxing Hall of Fame (1972)
- International Jewish Sports Hall of Fame (1984)
- World Boxing Hall of Fame (1985)
- International Boxing Hall of Fame (1993)

== Selected filmography ==
- Mr. Broadway (1933) – 'Slapsy' Maxie
- King for a Night (1933) – Maxie
- Muss 'em Up (1936) – Snake
- Kelly the Second (1936) – Butch Flynn
- Two Wise Maids (1937) – Max Handler, Champ
- Marry the Girl (1937) – Boxer (uncredited)
- Big City (1937) – Himself
- Nothing Sacred (1937) – Max Levinsky
- The Kid Comes Back (1938) – Stan Wilson
- Mr. Moto's Gamble (1938) – Horace Wellington
- Gangs of New York (1938) – Tombstone
- The Amazing Dr. Clitterhouse (1938) – Butch
- The Crowd Roars (1938) – Himself (uncredited)
- Submarine Patrol (1938) – Marine Sentry Sgt. Joe Duffy
- His Exciting Night (1938) – 'Doc' McCoy
- Slapsie Maxie's (1939, short) – Himself
- Women in the Wind (1939) – Stuffy McInnes
- The Kid from Kokomo (1939) – Curley Bender
- Naughty but Nice (1939) – Killer
- Each Dawn I Die (1939) – Fargo Red
- 20,000 Men a Year (1939) – Walt Dorgan
- Private Detective (1939) – Brody
- Grandpa Goes to Town (1940) – Al
- Passport to Alcatraz (1940) – Hank Kircher
- Public Deb No. 1 (1940) – Eric
- The Lady and the Lug (1940, Short) – Himself
- Ringside Maisie (1941) – Chotsie
- The Stork Pays Off (1941) – 'Brains' Moran
- Harvard, Here I Come! (1941) – Maxie
- Louisiana Purchase (1941) – The Shadow aka Wilson
- Slick Chick (1941)
- To the Shores of Tripoli (1942) – Okay Jones
- Smart Alecks (1942) – Butch Brocalli
- The Boogie Man Will Get You (1942) – Maxie – the Powder Puff Salesman
- The Yanks Are Coming (1942) – Butch
- My Son, the Hero (1943) – Kid Slug Rosenthal
- Here Comes Kelly (1943) – Trixie Bell
- Swing Fever (1943) – 'Rags'
- Follow the Boys (1944) – Himself
- Allergic to Love (1944) – Max
- Three of a Kind (1944) – Maxie
- Irish Eyes Are Smiling (1944) – Stanley Ketchel
- Crazy Knights (1944) – Maxie
- Night Club Girl (1945) – Percival J. Percival
- Trouble Chasers (1945) – Maxie
- Penthouse Rhythm (1945) – Health Spa Proprietor
- Men in Her Diary (1945) – Moxie Kildorff
- The Perils of Pauline (1947) – Maxie (uncredited)
- Hazard (1948) – Truck Driver
- Mr. Universe (1951) – Big Ears, the Trainer
- Skipalong Rosenbloom (1951) – Skipalong Rosenbloom
- Abbott and Costello Meet the Keystone Kops (1955) – Hinds
- Requiem for a Heavyweight (1956, TV Series) – Steve
- Hollywood or Bust (1956) – Bookie Benny
- I Married a Monster from Outer Space (1958) – Max Grady – Bartender
- The Beat Generation (1959) – The Wrestling Beatnik
- The Bellboy (1960) – Maxie – Gangster
- Two Guys Abroad (1962) – Nightclub co-owner
- Don't Worry, We'll Think of a Title (1966) – Foreign Agent (scenes deleted)
- The Spy in the Green Hat (1967) – 'Crunch' Battaglia
- Cottonpickin' Chickenpickers (1967) – Maxie the Mailman
- My Side of the Mountain (1969) – Flint Seller (final film role)

== Professional boxing record ==
All information in this section is derived from BoxRec, unless otherwise stated.

=== Official record ===
298 fights	207 wins	39 losses
By knockout	19	2
By decision	183	37
By disqualification	5	0
Draws	26	
No contests	2	
Newspaper decisions/draws	24	

All newspaper decisions are officially regarded as "no decision" bouts and are not counted in the win/loss/draw column.

No.	Result	Record	Opponent	Type	Round	Date	Age	Location	Notes
298	Win	207–39–26 (26)	Al Ettore	KO	3 (10)	Jun 26, 1938	31 years, 232 days	Gilmore Stadium, Los Angeles, California, U.S.	
297	Draw	206–39–26 (26)	Bob Pastor	PTS	10	Aug 5, 1938	31 years, 272 days	Gilmore Stadium, Los Angeles, California, U.S.	
296	Win	206–39–25 (26)	Lou Nova	PTS	10	Jun 3, 1938	31 years, 209 days	Gilmore Stadium, Los Angeles, California, U.S.	Won USA California heavyweight title
295	Win	205–39–25 (26)	Odell Polee	KO	5 (10)	May 28, 1938	31 years, 203 days	Lane Field, San Diego, California, U.S.	
294	Win	204–39–25 (26)	Cowboy Jay	PTS	6	Dec 16, 1937	31 years, 40 days	Hermosa Beach, California, U.S.	
293	Win	203–39–25 (26)	Al Bray	MD	10	Dec 7, 1937	31 years, 31 days	Olympic Auditorium, Los Angeles, California, U.S.	
292	Loss	202–39–25 (26)	Jimmy Adamick	KO	2 (10)	Nov 19, 1937	31 years, 13 days	Olympia Stadium, Detroit, Michigan, U.S.	
291	Win	202–38–25 (26)	Bob Nestell	PTS	10	Oct 12, 1937	30 years, 340 days	Olympic Auditorium, Los Angeles, California, U.S.	
290	Win	201–38–25 (26)	Nash Garrison	PTS	10	Sep 29, 1937	30 years, 327 days	Auditorium, Oakland, California, U.S.	
289	Win	200–38–25 (26)	Jimmy Adamick	PTS	10	Sep 17, 1937	30 years, 315 days	Olympia Stadium, Detroit, Michigan, U.S.	
288	Win	199–38–25 (26)	Johnny Erjavec	PTS	10	Jul 16, 1937	30 years, 252 days	Legion Stadium, Hollywood, California, U.S.	
287	Win	198–38–25 (26)	Lee Ramage	PTS	10	Jun 8, 1937	30 years, 214 days	Olympic Auditorium, Los Angeles, California, U.S.	
286	Loss	197–38–25 (26)	Alberto Santiago Lovell	PTS	10	Apr 27, 1937	30 years, 172 days	Olympic Auditorium, Los Angeles, California, U.S.	
285	Win	197–37–25 (26)	Roscoe Toles	PTS	10	Mar 29, 1937	30 years, 143 days	Olympia Stadium, Detroit, Michigan, U.S.	
284	Win	196–37–25 (26)	Tom Beaupre	PTS	10	Mar 11, 1937	30 years, 125 days	Sportatorium, Dallas, Texas, U.S.	
283	Win	195–37–25 (26)	Jack Kranz	PTS	8	Feb 9, 1937	30 years, 95 days	D.A.V. Arena, Modesto, California, U.S.	
282	Win	194–37–25 (26)	King Levinsky	PTS	10	Jan 5, 1937	30 years, 60 days	Olympic Auditorium, Los Angeles, California, U.S.	
281	Draw	193–37–25 (26)	Deacon Leo Kelly	PTS	15	Aug 15, 1936	29 years, 283 days	West Melbourne Stadium, Melbourne, Victoria, Australia	
280	Win	193–37–24 (26)	Deacon Leo Kelly	PTS	15	Jul 20, 1936	29 years, 257 days	Sydney Stadium, Sydney, New South Wales, Australia	
279	Win	192–37–24 (26)	George Simpson	TKO	3 (15)	Jun 8, 1936	29 years, 215 days	Sydney Stadium, Sydney, New South Wales, Australia	
278	Win	191–37–24 (26)	Johnny Sikes	PTS	10	Feb 12, 1936	29 years, 98 days	Legion Arena, Las Vegas, Nevada, U.S.	
277	Win	190–37–24 (26)	Charley Coates	PTS	10	Jan 28, 1936	29 years, 83 days	Olympic Auditorium, Los Angeles, California, U.S.	
276	Win	189–37–24 (26)	Tuffy Dial	PTS	10	Jan 17, 1936	29 years, 72 days	Madison Square Garden, Phoenix, Arizona, U.S.	
275	Win	188–37–24 (26)	John Henry Lewis	PTS	10	Nov 29, 1935	29 years, 23 days	Dreamland Auditorium, San Francisco, California, U.S.	
274	Draw	187–37–24 (26)	James Green	PTS	6	Nov 15, 1935	29 years, 9 days	Ventura A.C., Ventura, California, U.S.	
273	Win	187–37–23 (26)	Frank Rowsey	PTS	10	Nov 1, 1935	28 years, 360 days	Legion Stadium, Hollywood, California, U.S.	
272	Loss	186–37–23 (26)	Tiger Jack Fox	MD	10	Oct 11, 1935	28 years, 339 days	Armory, Spokane, Washington, U.S.	For inaugural USA Washington State light heavyweight title
271	Draw	186–36–23 (26)	Tiger Jack Fox	PTS	10	Sep 6, 1935	28 years, 304 days	Gonzaga Stadium, Spokane, Washington, U.S.	
270	Win	186–36–22 (26)	George Simpson	PTS	10	Aug 21, 1935	28 years, 288 days	Civic Auditorium, San Francisco, California, U.S.	
269	Win	185–36–22 (26)	Harold Murphy	PTS	8	Aug 16, 1935	28 years, 283 days	Chestnut St. Arena, Reno, Nevada, U.S.	
268	Loss	184–36–22 (26)	Hank Hankinson	PTS	10	Aug 12, 1935	28 years, 279 days	Auditorium, Oakland, California, U.S.	
267	Loss	184–35–22 (26)	Hank Hankinson	PTS	10	Jul 19, 1935	28 years, 255 days	Legion Stadium, Hollywood, California, U.S.	
266	Win	184–34–22 (26)	John Henry Lewis	PTS	10	Jul 17, 1935	28 years, 253 days	Auditorium, Oakland, California, U.S.	
265	Win	183–34–22 (26)	Abe Feldman	PTS	10	Jun 18, 1935	28 years, 224 days	Olympic Auditorium, Los Angeles, California, U.S.	
264	Win	182–34–22 (26)	Harold Murphy	PTS	6	Jun 13, 1935	28 years, 219 days	Ventura A.C., Ventura, California, U.S.	
263	Win	181–34–22 (26)	Ford Smith	PTS	10	Jun 7, 1935	28 years, 213 days	Legion Stadium, Hollywood, California, U.S.	
262	Win	180–34–22 (26)	Harold Murphy	PTS	6	May 22, 1935	28 years, 197 days	Wilmington Bowl, Wilmington, California, U.S.	
261	Win	179–34–22 (26)	Oscar Rankins	PTS	10	May 14, 1935	28 years, 189 days	Olympic Auditorium, Los Angeles, California, U.S.	
260	Win	178–34–22 (26)	Homer Brandeis	PTS	10	May 2, 1935	28 years, 177 days	Auditorium, Oakland, California, U.S.	
259	Win	177–34–22 (26)	Charley Massera	PTS	10	Apr 18, 1935	28 years, 163 days	Legion Stadium, Hollywood, California, U.S.	
258	Win	176–34–22 (26)	Frank Rowsey	PTS	10	Mar 15, 1935	28 years, 129 days	Legion Stadium, Hollywood, California, U.S.	
257	Win	175–34–22 (26)	Terris Hill	KO	3 (10)	Mar 1, 1935	28 years, 115 days	Madison Square Garden, Phoenix, Arizona, U.S.	
256	Win	174–34–22 (26)	Rosy Rosales	TKO	2 (10)	Feb 22, 1935	28 years, 108 days	Madison Square Garden, Phoenix, Arizona, U.S.	
255	Win	173–34–22 (26)	Bob Godwin	PTS	10	Feb 15, 1935	28 years, 101 days	Legion Stadium, Hollywood, California, U.S.	
254	Win	172–34–22 (26)	Johnny Miler	PTS	10	Feb 5, 1935	28 years, 91 days	Olympic Auditorium, Los Angeles, California, U.S.	
253	Win	171–34–22 (26)	Frank Rowsey	PTS	10	Jan 29, 1935	28 years, 84 days	Olympic Auditorium, Los Angeles, California, U.S.	
252	Win	170–34–22 (26)	Johnny Nelson	PTS	10	Jan 14, 1935	28 years, 69 days	Arena, Syracuse, New York, U.S.	
251	Win	169–34–22 (26)	Al Stillman	PTS	10	Jan 7, 1935	28 years, 62 days	Auditorium, Saint Joseph, Missouri, U.S.	
250	Win	168–34–22 (26)	Tony Shucco	UD	10	Dec 21, 1934	28 years, 45 days	Boston Garden, Boston, Massachusetts, U.S.	
249	Win	167–34–22 (26)	Al Gainer	PTS	12	Dec 3, 1934	28 years, 27 days	Arena, New Haven, Connecticut, U.S.	
248	Loss	166–34–22 (26)	Bob Olin	UD	15	Nov 16, 1934	28 years, 10 days	Madison Square Garden, New York, U.S.	Lost NYSAC and The Ring light heavyweight titles
247	Draw	166–33–22 (26)	Johnny Miler	NWS	10	Oct 22, 1934	27 years, 350 days	Coliseum, Des Moines, Iowa, U.S.	
246	Win	166–33–22 (25)	Deacon Leo Kelly	PTS	10	Oct 8, 1934	27 years, 336 days	Civic Auditorium, San Francisco, California, U.S.	
245	Win	165–33–22 (25)	Pietro Georgi	PTS	10	Aug 8, 1934	27 years, 275 days	Auditorium, Oakland, California, U.S.	
244	Loss	164–33–22 (25)	Lee Ramage	PTS	10	Jul 31, 1934	27 years, 267 days	Olympic Auditorium, Los Angeles, California, U.S.	
243	Loss	164–32–22 (25)	Lee Ramage	PTS	10	Jul 10, 1934	27 years, 246 days	Olympic Auditorium, Los Angeles, California, U.S.	
242	Draw	164–31–22 (25)	Lee Ramage	PTS	10	Jun 26, 1934	27 years, 232 days	Olympic Auditorium, Los Angeles, California, U.S.	
241	Win	164–31–21 (25)	Deacon Leo Kelly	PTS	10	Jun 15, 1934	27 years, 221 days	Bakersfield Arena, Bakersfield, California, U.S.	
240	Win	163–31–21 (25)	Maxie Maxwell	TKO	5 (10)	Jun 12, 1934	27 years, 218 days	Broadway Arena, Tucson, Arizona, U.S.	
239	Win	162–31–21 (25)	Young Sam Langford	PTS	10	Jun 8, 1934	27 years, 214 days	Madison Square Garden, Phoenix, Arizona, U.S.	
238	Win	161–31–21 (25)	Dutch Weimer	PTS	10	Jun 1, 1934	27 years, 207 days	Coliseum, San Diego, California, U.S.	
237	Loss	160–31–21 (25)	Mickey Walker	PTS	10	May 8, 1934	27 years, 183 days	Olympic Auditorium, Los Angeles, California, U.S.	
236	Draw	160–30–21 (25)	Al Gainer	PTS	10	Apr 23, 1934	27 years, 168 days	Arena, New Haven, Connecticut, U.S.	
235	Loss	160–30–20 (25)	Clyde Chastain	PTS	10	Apr 16, 1934	27 years, 151 days	City Coliseum, Oklahoma City, Oklahoma, U.S.	
234	Win	160–29–20 (25)	Johnny Miler	SD	10	Apr 9, 1934	27 years, 154 days	Coliseum Arena, New Orleans, Louisiana, U.S.	
233	Win	159–29–20 (25)	Leroy Brown	PTS	10	Mar 22, 1934	27 years, 136 days	Sullivan's Bowl, Charleston, South Carolina, U.S.	
232	Win	158–29–20 (25)	Cyclone Smith	PTS	10	Mar 15, 1934	27 years, 129 days	Municipal Auditorium, Macon, Georgia, U.S.	
231	Win	157–29–20 (25)	Gordon Fortenberry	UD	10	Mar 12, 1934	27 years, 126 days	Auditorium, Orlando, Florida, U.S.	
230	Draw	156–29–20 (25)	Joe Knight	PTS	15	Feb 5, 1934	27 years, 91 days	Madison Square Garden Stadium, Miami, Florida, U.S.	Retained NYSAC, NBA, and The Ring light heavyweight titles
229	Loss	156–29–19 (25)	Bob Godwin	PTS	12	Jan 11, 1934	27 years, 66 days	Dixie Theatre, West Palm Beach, Florida, U.S.	
228	Draw	156–28–19 (25)	Bob Godwin	SD	10	Dec 21, 1933	27 years, 45 days	Dixie Theatre, West Palm Beach, Florida, U.S.	
227	Loss	156–28–18 (25)	Charley Massera	SD	10	Dec 19, 1933	27 years, 43 days	Ridgewood Grove, New York City, New York, U.S.	
226	Win	156–27–18 (25)	Wilson Dunn	PTS	10	Dec 4, 1933	27 years, 28 days	Fort Worth, Texas, U.S.	
225	Draw	155–27–18 (25)	Clyde Chastain	PTS	10	Nov 28, 1933	27 years, 22 days	City Auditorium, Houston, Texas, U.S.	
224	Win	155–27–17 (25)	Mickey Walker	UD	15	Nov 3, 1933	26 years, 362 days	Madison Square Garden, New York City, New York, U.S.	Retained NYSAC, NBA, and The Ring light heavyweight titles
223	Draw	154–27–17 (25)	Clyde Chastain	PTS	10	Oct 16, 1933	26 years, 344 days	Soldiers and Sailors Memorial Auditorium, Chattanooga, Tennessee, U.S.	
222	Win	154–27–16 (25)	Rosy Rosales	PTS	10	Sep 28, 1933	26 years, 326 days	Liberty Hall, El Paso, Texas, U.S.	
221	Loss	153–27–16 (25)	Young Stribling	UD	10	Sep 22, 1933	26 years, 320 days	Sam Houston Hall, Houston, Texas, U.S.	
220	Win	153–26–16 (25)	Chuck Burns	PTS	10	Sep 19, 1933	26 years, 317 days	Fort Sam Houston Stadium, San Antonio, Texas, U.S.	
219	Win	152–26–16 (25)	Joe Rice	PTS	10	Sep 12, 1933	26 years, 310 days	Hotel Texas, Fort Worth, Texas, U.S.	
218	Win	151–26–16 (25)	Leroy Haynes	PTS	10	Aug 30, 1933	26 years, 297 days	Olympic Auditorium, Los Angeles, California, U.S.	
217	Win	150–26–16 (25)	Ernest Bendy	PTS	10	Aug 15, 1933	26 years, 282 days	Olympic Auditorium, Los Angeles, California, U.S.	
216	Win	149–26–16 (25)	Meyer Christner	TKO	6 (10)	Aug 8, 1933	26 years, 275 days	Olympic Auditorium, Los Angeles, California, U.S.	
215	Loss	148–26–16 (25)	John Henry Lewis	PTS	10	Jul 31, 1933	26 years, 267 days	Civic Auditorium, San Francisco, California, U.S.	
214	Draw	148–25–16 (25)	Fred Lenhart	PTS	10	Jul 20, 1933	26 years, 256 days	Greenwich Coliseum, Tacoma, Washington, U.S.	
213	Loss	148–25–15 (25)	John Henry Lewis	PTS	10	Jul 10, 1933	26 years, 246 days	Civic Auditorium, San Francisco, California, U.S.	
212	Win	148–24–15 (25)	Popper Stopper	PTS	10	Jun 20, 1933	26 years, 226 days	Leiperville Arena, Leiperville, Pennsylvania, U.S.	
211	Win	147–24–15 (25)	Buddy McArthur	PTS	10	Jun 2, 1933	26 years, 208 days	Clarksburg, West Virginia, U.S.	
210	Win	146–24–15 (25)	Nick Popicg	PTS	10	May 26, 1933	26 years, 201 days	Armory Arena, Charleston, West Virginia, U.S.	
209	Win	145–24–15 (25)	Charley Belanger	UD	10	May 8, 1933	26 years, 183 days	Dog Track, Jeffersonville, Indiana, U.S.	
208	Win	144–24–15 (25)	Harold Murphy	UD	10	Apr 28, 1933	26 years, 173 days	Shrine Mosque, Springfield, Illinois, U.S.	
207	Draw	143–24–15 (25)	Al Stillman	PTS	10	Apr 25, 1933	26 years, 170 days	Springfield, Illinois, U.S.	
206	Win	143–24–14 (25)	Martin Levandowski	UD	10	Apr 19, 1933	26 years, 164 days	Arena, Saint Louis, Missouri, U.S.	
205	Loss	142–24–14 (25)	Lou Scozza	SD	10	Apr 3, 1933	26 years, 148 days	Broadway Auditorium, Buffalo, New York, U.S.	
204	Win	142–23–14 (25)	Bob Godwin	TKO	4 (15)	Mar 24, 1933	26 years, 138 days	Madison Square Garden, New York City, New York, U.S.	Retained NYSAC and The Ring light heavyweight titles; Won NBA light heavyweight title
203	Win	141–23–14 (25)	Adolf Heuser	UD	15	Mar 10, 1933	26 years, 124 days	Madison Square Garden, New York City, New York, U.S.	Retained NYSAC and The Ring light heavyweight titles
202	Win	140–23–14 (25)	Al Stillman	PTS	15	Feb 22, 1933	26 years, 108 days	Arena, Saint Louis, Missouri, U.S.	
201	Win	139–23–14 (25)	Al Stillman	PTS	12	Jan 24, 1933	26 years, 79 days	Arena, Saint Louis, Missouri, U.S.	
200	Win	138–23–14 (25)	Chuck Burns	PTS	10	Jan 20, 1933	26 years, 75 days	Winston-Salem, North Carolina, U.S.	
199	Win	137–23–14 (25)	Billy Jones	PTS	10	Dec 29, 1932	26 years, 53 days	Chicago Stadium, Chicago, Illinois, U.S.	
198	Win	136–23–14 (25)	Jack Silva	PTS	10	Dec 20, 1932	26 years, 44 days	Armory, Albuquerque, New Mexico, U.S.	
197	Win	135–23–14 (25)	Leroy Haynes	PTS	10	Dec 16, 1932	26 years, 40 days	Dreamland Auditorium, San Francisco, California, U.S.	
196	Win	134–23–14 (25)	Tony Poloni	PTS	10	Dec 6, 1932	26 years, 30 days	Forman's Arena, San Jose, California, U.S.	
195	Win	133–23–14 (25)	Jack Silva	PTS	10	Dec 1, 1932	26 years, 25 days	Stockton, California, U.S.	
194	Win	132–23–14 (25)	Tony Poloni	PTS	10	Nov 23, 1932	26 years, 17 days	L Street Arena, Sacramento, California, U.S.	
193	Win	131–23–14 (25)	John Henry Lewis	PTS	10	Nov 16, 1932	26 years, 10 days	Civic Auditorium, San Francisco, California, U.S.	
192	Win	130–23–14 (25)	Tiger Jack Fox	PTS	10	Oct 17, 1932	25 years, 346 days	Memorial Hall, Dayton, Ohio, U.S.	
191	Win	129–23–14 (25)	Jack Redman	PTS	10	Oct 12, 1932	25 years, 341 days	Ebbets Field, New York City, New York, U.S.	
190	Win	128–23–14 (25)	Lou Scozza	UD	10	Sep 29, 1932	25 years, 328 days	Baseball Stadium, Montreal, Quebec, Canada	
189	Win	127–23–14 (25)	Jimmy Herman	UD	10	Sep 19, 1932	25 years, 318 days	Lakewood Park, Mahanoy City, Pennsylvania, U.S.	
188	Win	126–23–14 (25)	Natie Brown	PTS	10	Sep 14, 1932	25 years, 313 days	Twin City Arena, Laurel, Maryland, U.S.	
187	Draw	125–23–14 (25)	Bob Godwin	PTS	10	Aug 30, 1932	25 years, 298 days	Armory, Charlotte, North Carolina, U.S.	
186	Win	125–23–13 (25)	Bob Godwin	PTS	10	Aug 22, 1932	25 years, 290 days	Twin City Arena, Laurel, Maryland, U.S.	
185	Win	124–23–13 (25)	Joe Barlow	UD	10	Aug 2, 1932	25 years, 270 days	Fenway Park, Boston, Massachusetts, U.S.	
184	Win	123–23–13 (25)	Lou Scozza	MD	15	Jul 14, 1932	25 years, 251 days	Bison Stadium, Buffalo, New York, U.S.	Retained NYSAC and The Ring light heavyweight titles
183	Win	122–23–13 (25)	Martin Levandowski	PTS	10	Jun 30, 1932	25 years, 237 days	Grand Rapids, Michigan, U.S.	
182	Win	121–23–13 (25)	Sam Weiss	PTS	10	Jun 20, 1932	25 years, 227 days	Heywood Arena, West Springfield, Massachusetts, U.S.	
181	Loss	120–23–13 (25)	Tony Shucco	UD	10	Jun 14, 1932	25 years, 221 days	Fair Grounds Arena, Allentown, Pennsylvania, U.S.	
180	Win	120–22–13 (25)	Larry Johnson	PTS	10	Jun 8, 1932	25 years, 215 days	Greenlee Field, Pittsburgh, Pennsylvania, U.S.	
179	Win	119–22–13 (25)	Don "Red" Barry	PTS	10	May 23, 1932	25 years, 199 days	Twin City Arena, Laurel, Maryland, U.S.	
178	Win	118–22–13 (25)	Harry Ebbets	SD	10	May 16, 1932	25 years, 192 days	Eastern States Coliseum, West Springfield, Massachusetts, U.S.	
177	Win	117–22–13 (25)	Harry Fuller	PTS	10	May 11, 1932	25 years, 187 days	Arena, Niagara Falls, Canada	
176	Win	116–22–13 (25)	Lou Scozza	PTS	10	Apr 21, 1932	25 years, 167 days	I.M.A. Auditorium, Flint, Michigan, U.S.	
175	Win	115–22–13 (25)	Stanley Wellise	PTS	10	Apr 15, 1932	25 years, 161 days	Grand Rapids, Michigan, U.S.	
174	Win	114–22–13 (25)	Willie Oster	PTS	12	Mar 21, 1932	25 years, 136 days	Biscayne Arena, Miami, Florida, U.S.	
173	Loss	113–22–13 (25)	Joe Knight	PTS	10	Mar 18, 1932	25 years, 133 days	Daytona Beach, Florida, U.S.	
172	Draw	113–21–13 (25)	Bob Godwin	PTS	10	Feb 17, 1932	25 years, 103 days	National Guard Arena, Daytona Beach, Florida, U.S.	
171	Win	113–21–12 (25)	Gordon Fortenberry	PTS	10	Jan 26, 1932	25 years, 81 days	Legion Arena, West Palm Beach, Florida, U.S.	
170	Win	112–21–12 (25)	Frankie Wine	PTS	10	Jan 15, 1932	25 years, 70 days	Coliseum, Coral Gables, Florida, U.S.	
169	Loss	111–21–12 (25)	Dave Maier	SD	10	Jan 1, 1932	25 years, 56 days	Auditorium, Milwaukee, Wisconsin, U.S.	
168	Win	111–20–12 (25)	Cyclone Smith	PTS	10	Dec 17, 1931	25 years, 41 days	Savannah, Georgia, U.S.	
167	NC	110–20–12 (25)	James J. Braddock	NC	2 (10)	Nov 10, 1931	25 years, 4 days	Auditorium, Minneapolis, Minnesota, U.S.	
166	Win	110–20–12 (24)	Battling Bozo	UD	12	Nov 2, 1931	24 years, 361 days	Convention Hall, Kansas City, Missouri, U.S.	
165	Win	109–20–12 (24)	Russ Rowsey	PTS	10	Oct 26, 1931	24 years, 354 days	Sullivan's Bowl, Charleston, Maryland, U.S.	
164	Win	108–20–12 (24)	Dick Daniels	KO	7 (10)	Oct 20, 1931	24 years, 348 days	Auditorium, Minneapolis, Minnesota, U.S.	
163	Draw	107–20–12 (24)	Battling Bozo	PTS	10	Sep 22, 1931	24 years, 320 days	City Auditorium, Atlanta, Georgia, U.S.	
162	Win	107–20–11 (24)	Owen Phelps	NWS	10	Sep 14, 1931	24 years, 312 days	Coliseum, Des Moines, Iowa, U.S.	
161	Win	107–20–11 (23)	Jimmy Slattery	UD	15	Aug 5, 1931	24 years, 272 days	Ebbets Field, New York City, New York, U.S.	Retained NYSAC and The Ring light heavyweight titles
160	Loss	106–20–11 (23)	George Manley	UD	10	Jul 22, 1931	24 years, 258 days	City Auditorium, Denver, Colorado, U.S.	
159	Win	106–19–11 (23)	Joe Banovic	UD	10	Jul 9, 1931	24 years, 245 days	Watres Armory, Scranton, Pennsylvania, U.S.	
158	Win	105–19–11 (23)	Billy Jones	PTS	10	Jun 29, 1931	24 years, 235 days	Arena Stadium, Philadelphia, Pennsylvania, U.S.	
157	Win	104–19–11 (23)	Charley Belanger	PTS	10	Jun 15, 1931	24 years, 221 days	Arena Gardens, Toronto, Canada	
156	Win	103–19–11 (23)	Fred Lenhart	PTS	10	Jun 2, 1931	24 years, 208 days	Punch Bowl Arena, Alan, Idaho, U.S.	
155	Win	102–19–11 (23)	Don Petrin	PTS	10	May 15, 1931	24 years, 190 days	Legion Stadium, Hollywood, California, U.S.	
154	Win	101–19–11 (23)	Leo Lomski	PTS	10	May 5, 1931	24 years, 180 days	Auditorium, Portland, Oregon, U.S.	
153	Loss	100–19–11 (23)	George Manley	SD	10	Apr 30, 1931	24 years, 175 days	Stockyards Stadium, Denver, Colorado, U.S.	
152	Loss	100–18–11 (23)	Billy Jones	SD	10	Apr 6, 1931	24 years, 151 days	Motor Square Garden, Pittsburgh, Pennsylvania, U.S.	
151	Win	100–17–11 (23)	Joe Banovic	UD	10	Mar 19, 1931	24 years, 133 days	Watres Armory, Scranton, Pennsylvania, U.S.	
150	Win	99–17–11 (23)	Marty Gallagher	PTS	8	Mar 5, 1931	24 years, 119 days	Madison Square Garden Stadium, Miami, Florida, U.S.	
149	Win	98–17–11 (23)	Tony Cancela	NWS	10	Feb 20, 1931	24 years, 106 days	Benjamin Field Arena, Tampa, Florida, U.S.	
148	Draw	98–17–11 (22)	Battling Bozo	NWS	10	Feb 9, 1931	24 years, 95 days	City Auditorium, Birmingham, Alabama, U.S.	
147	Win	98–17–11 (21)	Gene McCue	KO	3 (8)	Jan 27, 1931	24 years, 82 days	Columbus Hall, Stamford, Connecticut, U.S.	
146	Win	97–17–11 (21)	Gene McCue	PTS	8	Jan 16, 1931	24 years, 71 days	Armory, Hackensack, New Jersey, U.S.	
145	NC	96–17–11 (21)	Paul Swiderski	NC	7 (10)	Dec 2, 1930	24 years, 26 days	Arena, Saint Louis, Missouri, U.S.	
144	Win	96–17–11 (20)	Patsy Perroni	NWS	10	Nov 24, 1930	24 years, 18 days	Canton Auditorium, Canton, Ohio, U.S.	
143	Win	96–17–11 (19)	Abie Bain	TKO	11 (15)	Oct 22, 1930	23 years, 350 days	Madison Square Garden, New York City, New York, U.S.	Retained NBA, NYSAC, and The Ring light heavyweight titles
142	Win	95–17–11 (19)	Battling Bozo	NWS	10	Sep 29, 1930	23 years, 327 days	Legion Field, Birmingham, Alabama, U.S.	
141	Draw	95–17–11 (18)	Leo Lomski	PTS	8	Aug 21, 1930	23 years, 288 days	Electric Park, Hoquiam, Washington, U.S.	
140	Win	95–17–10 (18)	Willard Dix	PTS	10	Aug 4, 1930	23 years, 271 days	Auditorium, Oakland, California, U.S.	
139	Win	94–17–10 (18)	Jimmy Slattery	SD	15	Jun 25, 1930	23 years, 231 days	Bison Stadium, Buffalo, New York, U.S.	Won NYSAC and vacant The Ring light heavyweight titles
138	Win	93–17–10 (18)	George Hoffman	UD	10	Jun 3, 1930	23 years, 209 days	Queensboro Stadium, Long Island City, New York City, New York, U.S.	
137	Win	92–17–10 (18)	Larry Johnson	UD	10	Apr 30, 1930	23 years, 175 days	Madison Square Garden, New York City, New York, U.S.	
136	Win	91–17–10 (18)	Harry Fuller	PTS	10	Apr 7, 1930	23 years, 152 days	Broadway Auditorium, Buffalo, New York City, New York, U.S.	
135	Win	90–17–10 (18)	Larry Johnson	DQ	6 (10)	Mar 10, 1930	23 years, 124 days	Madison Square Garden, New York City, New York, U.S.	
134	Win	89–17–10 (18)	Ace Hudkins	UD	10	Feb 14, 1930	23 years, 100 days	Madison Square Garden, New York City, New York, U.S.	
133	Win	88–17–10 (18)	Leo Lomski	UD	10	Jan 3, 1930	23 years, 58 days	Madison Square Garden, New York City, New York, U.S.	
132	Win	87–17–10 (18)	Yale Okun	PTS	12	Dec 9, 1929	23 years, 33 days	Madison Square Garden, New York City, New York, U.S.	
131	Win	86–17–10 (18)	Leo Williams	PTS	10	Nov 30, 1929	23 years, 24 days	Olympia Boxing Club, New York City, New York, U.S.	
130	Loss	85–17–10 (18)	Jimmy Slattery	MD	10	Nov 25, 1929	23 years, 19 days	Broadway Auditorium, Buffalo, New York City, New York, U.S.	
129	Win	85–16–10 (18)	James J. Braddock	PTS	10	Nov 15, 1929	23 years, 9 days	Madison Square Garden, New York City, New York, U.S.	
128	Win	84–16–10 (18)	Joe Sekyra	PTS	10	Oct 21, 1929	22 years, 349 days	Madison Square Garden, New York City, New York, U.S.	
127	Win	83–16–10 (18)	Jimmy Slattery	PTS	10	Oct 14, 1929	22 years, 342 days	Arena, Philadelphia, Pennsylvania, U.S.	
126	Win	82–16–10 (18)	Tiger Jack Payne	PTS	10	Sep 28, 1929	22 years, 326 days	Olympia Boxing Club, New York City, New York, U.S.	
125	Win	81–16–10 (18)	Hale K.O. Brown	PTS	10	Sep 10, 1929	22 years, 308 days	Meyers Bowl, North Braddock, Pennsylvania, U.S.	
124	Win	80–16–10 (18)	Cuban Bobby Brown	PTS	10	Aug 29, 1929	22 years, 296 days	American Legion Arena, Franklin, New Hampshire, U.S.	
123	Win	79–16–10 (18)	Harry Martone	PTS	10	Aug 28, 1929	22 years, 295 days	Bayonne, New Jersey, U.S.	
122	Win	78–16–10 (18)	Tiger Jack Payne	DQ	8 (10)	Aug 24, 1929	22 years, 291 days	Coney Island Stadium, New York City, New York, U.S.	
121	Win	77–16–10 (18)	Leo Williams	TKO	9 (10)	Aug 16, 1929	22 years, 283 days	Playland Stadium, Rockaway Beach, New York City, New York, U.S.	
120	Win	76–16–10 (18)	Harry Dillon	UD	10	Jul 30, 1929	22 years, 266 days	Auditorium, Portland, Oregon, U.S.	
119	Loss	75–16–10 (18)	Fred Lenhart	SD	10	Jul 19, 1929	22 years, 255 days	Punch Bowl Arena, Alan, Idaho, U.S.	
118	Win	75–15–10 (18)	Willie Feldman	PTS	6	Jul 12, 1929	22 years, 248 days	Hoquiam, Washington, U.S.	
117	Win	74–15–10 (18)	Joe Anderson	UD	10	Jul 4, 1929	22 years, 240 days	Vaughn Street Park, Portland, Oregon, U.S.	
116	Win	73–15–10 (18)	Joe Anderson	PTS	10	Jun 18, 1929	22 years, 224 days	Redland Field, Cincinnati, Ohio, U.S.	
115	Win	72–15–10 (18)	Charley Belanger	PTS	10	Apr 26, 1929	22 years, 140 days	Chicago Stadium, Chicago, Illinois, U.S.	
114	Win	71–15–10 (18)	Joe Anderson	UD	10	Apr 3, 1929	22 years, 148 days	Music Hall Arena, Cincinnati, Ohio, U.S.	
113	Win	70–15–10 (18)	Cuban Bobby Brown	PTS	10	Mar 22, 1929	22 years, 136 days	Alhambra, Syracuse, New York, U.S.	
112	Win	69–15–10 (18)	Leo Lomski	UD	10	Mar 18, 1929	22 years, 132 days	Arena, Philadelphia, Pennsylvania, U.S.	
111	Win	68–15–10 (18)	Osk Till	PTS	10	Mar 11, 1929	22 years, 125 days	Madison Square Garden, New York City, New York, U.S.	
110	Win	67–15–10 (18)	Garfield Johnson	PTS	6	Mar 4, 1929	22 years, 118 days	Broadway Auditorium, Buffalo, New York, U.S.	
109	Win	66–15–10 (18)	Garfield Johnson	UD	10	Feb 19, 1929	22 years, 105 days	South Main Street Armory, Wilkes-Barre, Pennsylvania, U.S.	
108	Win	65–15–10 (18)	Jack McVey	PTS	10	Jan 26, 1929	22 years, 81 days	Convention Hall, Rochester, New York, U.S.	
107	Win	64–15–10 (18)	Osk Till	PTS	10	Dec 26, 1928	22 years, 50 days	Broadway Auditorium, Buffalo, New York, U.S.	
106	Win	63–15–10 (18)	Tiger Thomas	PTS	8	Nov 26, 1928	22 years, 20 days	Elks Club, Williamsport, Pennsylvania, U.S.	
105	Win	62–15–10 (18)	Cuban Bobby Brown	PTS	10	Nov 22, 1928	22 years, 16 days	Oakland Arena, Jersey City, New Jersey, U.S.	
104	Win	61–15–10 (18)	Garfield Johnson	PTS	10	Oct 22, 1928	21 years, 351 days	Motor Square Garden, Pittsburgh, Pennsylvania, U.S.	
103	Win	60–15–10 (18)	Tiger Jack Payne	PTS	10	Oct 11, 1928	21 years, 340 days	Madison Square Garden, New York City, New York, U.S.	
102	Win	59–15–10 (18)	Homer Robertson	PTS	10	Sep 10, 1928	21 years, 309 days	American Legion Stadium, West Springfield, Massachusetts, U.S.	
101	Draw	58–15–10 (18)	Leo Lomski	PTS	10	Aug 24, 1928	21 years, 292 days	Ocean View A.A., Long Branch, New Jersey, U.S.	
100	Win	58–15–9 (18)	Harry Martone	PTS	10	Aug 3, 1928	21 years, 271 days	Ocean View A.A., Long Branch, New Jersey, U.S.	
99	Win	57–15–9 (18)	Ted "Kid" Lewis	DQ	6 (15)	Jul 31, 1928	21 years, 268 days	Queensboro Stadium, Long Island City, New York City, New York, U.S.	
98	Loss	56–15–9 (18)	Lou Scozza	MD	10	Jul 27, 1928	21 years, 264 days	Stockyards Stadium, Denver, Colorado, U.S.	
97	Win	56–14–9 (18)	Roland Todd	PTS	15	Jun 17, 1928	21 years, 224 days	Premierland, Whitechapel, London, England	
96	Loss	55–14–9 (18)	Tommy Milligan	KO	9 (15)	Jun 4, 1928	21 years, 211 days	Royal Albert Hall, Kensington, London, England	
95	Draw	55–13–9 (18)	Frankie Schoell	PTS	10	Mar 20, 1928	21 years, 135 days	South Main Street Armory, Wilkes-Barre, Pennsylvania, U.S.	
94	Win	55–13–8 (18)	Cuban Bobby Brown	PTS	10	Mar 5, 1928	21 years, 120 days	Motor Square Garden, Pittsburgh, Pennsylvania, U.S.	
93	Win	54–13–8 (18)	Willie Walker	PTS	4	Feb 23, 1928	21 years, 109 days	Broadway Arena, New York City, New York, U.S.	
92	Win	53–13–8 (18)	Jack McVey	PTS	8	Feb 17, 1928	21 years, 103 days	Madison Square Garden, New York City, New York, U.S.	
91	Loss	52–13–8 (18)	Pete Latzo	PTS	10	Feb 6, 1928	21 years, 92 days	South Main Street Armory, Wilkes-Barre, Pennsylvania, U.S.	
90	Win	52–12–8 (18)	Phil Kaplan	PTS	8	Feb 3, 1928	21 years, 89 days	Madison Square Garden, New York City, New York, U.S.	
89	Win	51–12–8 (18)	Dick Evans	PTS	10	Jan 20, 1928	21 years, 75 days	Convention Hall, Rochester, New York, U.S.	
88	Win	50–12–8 (18)	Garfield Johnson	UD	10	Jan 9, 1928	21 years, 64 days	Motor Square Garden, Pittsburgh, Pennsylvania, U.S.	
87	Win	49–12–8 (18)	Frankie Schoell	NWS	10	Jan 2, 1928	21 years, 57 days	Music Hall Arena, Cincinnati, Ohio, U.S.	
86	Loss	49–12–8 (17)	Joe Anderson	NWS	10	Dec 12, 1927	21 years, 36 days	Music Hall Arena, Cincinnati, Ohio, U.S.	
85	Win	49–12–8 (16)	Pete Latzo	SD	10	Nov 21, 1927	21 years, 15 days	Arena, Philadelphia, Pennsylvania, U.S.	
84	Loss	48–12–8 (16)	Jock Malone	NWS	10	Nov 15, 1927	21 years, 9 days	Auditorium, Saint Paul, Minnesota, U.S.	
83	Draw	48–12–8 (15)	Tiger Flowers	PTS	10	Nov 9, 1927	21 years, 3 days	Olympia Stadium, Detroit, Michigan, U.S.	
82	Win	48–12–7 (15)	Homer Robertson	PTS	10	Oct 17, 1927	20 years, 345 days	Motor Square Garden, Pittsburgh, Pennsylvania, U.S.	
81	Loss	47–12–7 (15)	Jimmy Slattery	PTS	10	Aug 30, 1927	20 years, 297 days	Velodrome, Hartford, Connecticut, U.S.	For vacant NBA light heavyweight title
80	Loss	47–11–7 (15)	Lou Scozza	UD	10	Aug 20, 1927	20 years, 287 days	Bison Stadium, Buffalo, New York, U.S.	
79	Win	47–10–7 (15)	Bob Sage	PTS	10	Aug 4, 1927	20 years, 271 days	Mack Park, Detroit, Michigan, U.S.	
78	Win	46–10–7 (15)	Tony Marullo	PTS	10	Jul 26, 1927	20 years, 262 days	Queensboro Stadium, Long Island City, New York City, New York, U.S.	
77	Draw	45–10–7 (15)	Tiger Flowers	PTS	10	Jul 4, 1927	20 years, 240 days	Comiskey Park, Chicago, Illinois, U.S.	
76	Loss	45–10–6 (15)	Leo Lomski	UD	12	Jun 21, 1927	20 years, 227 days	Queensboro Stadium, Long Island City, New York City, New York, U.S.	
75	Win	45–9–6 (15)	Frankie Schoell	PTS	15	Apr 11, 1927	20 years, 156 days	Broadway Auditorium, Buffalo, U.S.	
74	Win	44–9–6 (15)	Willie Walker	PTS	12	Apr 2, 1927	20 years, 147 days	Walker A.C., New York City, New York, U.S.	
73	Loss	43–9–6 (15)	Young Stribling	PTS	10	Mar 17, 1927	20 years, 131 days	Mechanics Building, Boston, Massachusetts, U.S.	
72	Loss	43–8–6 (15)	Jimmy Delaney	NWS	10	Feb 14, 1927	20 years, 128 days	Music Hall Arena, Cincinnati, Ohio, U.S.	
71	Win	43–8–6 (14)	Benny Ross	PTS	10	Jan 26, 1927	20 years, 81 days	Broadway Auditorium, Buffalo, New York, U.S.	
70	Win	42–8–6 (14)	Phil Kaplan	UD	10	Dec 13, 1926	20 years, 37 days	Madison Square Garden, New York City, New York, U.S.	
69	Win	41–8–6 (14)	Tiger Flowers	DQ	9 (10)	Oct 15, 1926	19 years, 343 days	Mechanics Building, Boston, Massachusetts, U.S.	
68	Win	40–8–6 (14)	Johnny Wilson	UD	10	Oct 4, 1926	19 years, 332 days	Motor Square Garden, Pittsburgh, Pennsylvania, U.S.	
67	Loss	39–8–6 (14)	Frankie Schoell	UD	12	Sep 20, 1926	19 years, 318 days	Broadway Auditorium, Buffalo, New York, U.S.	
66	Win	39–7–6 (14)	Jimmy Francis	PTS	10	Sep 14, 1926	19 years, 312 days	Queensboro Stadium, Long Island City, New York City, New York, U.S.	
65	Win	38–7–6 (14)	Johnny Wilson	PTS	12	Aug 27, 1926	19 years, 294 days	Coney Island Stadium, New York City, New York, U.S.	
64	Win	37–7–6 (14)	Chuck Burns	PTS	10	Aug 19, 1926	19 years, 286 days	Madison Square Garden, New York City, New York, U.S.	
63	Win	36–7–6 (14)	Jamaica Kid	KO	6 (8)	Aug 6, 1926	19 years, 273 days	Ocean Park Casino, Long Branch, New Jersey, U.S.	
62	Win	35–7–6 (14)	Jamaica Kid	NWS	8	Jul 23, 1926	19 years, 259 days	Bacharach Ball Park, Atlantic City, New Jersey, U.S.	
61	Win	35–7–6 (13)	Lou Scozza	PTS	10	Jul 15, 1926	19 years, 251 days	Bison Stadium, Buffalo, New York, U.S.	
60	Win	34–7–6 (13)	Dave Shade	PTS	12	Jun 29, 1926	19 years, 235 days	Queensboro Stadium, Long Island City, New York City, New York, U.S.	
59	Win	33–7–6 (13)	Dave Shade	UD	10	Jun 5, 1926	19 years, 211 days	Queensboro Stadium, Long Island City, New York City, New York, U.S.	
58	Win	32–7–6 (13)	Tommy West	NWS	10	Apr 30, 1926	19 years, 175 days	Convention Hall, Camden, New Jersey, U.S.	
57	Win	32–7–6 (12)	Frankie Schoell	PTS	10	Apr 19, 1926	19 years, 164 days	Broadway Auditorium, Buffalo, New York, U.S.	
56	Loss	31–7–6 (12)	Jack Delaney	PTS	10	Mar 22, 1926	19 years, 136 days	Arena, Philadelphia, Pennsylvania, U.S.	
55	Win	31–6–6 (12)	Willie Walker	PTS	10	Mar 12, 1926	19 years, 126 days	Staten Island Coliseum, New York City, New York, U.S.	
54	Win	30–6–6 (12)	Rocky Smith	NWS	10	Feb 22, 1926	19 years, 108 days	Arena, Trenton, New Jersey, U.S.	
53	Win	30–6–6 (11)	Frank Moody	PTS	12	Feb 2, 1926	19 years, 88 days	Pioneer Sporting Club, New York City, New York, U.S.	
52	Draw	29–6–6 (11)	Frankie Schoell	PTS	10	Jan 25, 1926	19 years, 80 days	Broadway Auditorium, Buffalo, New York, U.S.	
51	Win	29–6–5 (11)	Rocky Smith	PTS	10	Jan 18, 1926	19 years, 73 days	Arena, Philadelphia, Pennsylvania, U.S.	
50	Loss	28–6–5 (11)	Art Weigand	PTS	6	Jan 11, 1926	19 years, 66 days	Broadway Auditorium, Buffalo, New York, U.S.	
49	Loss	28–5–5 (11)	Jimmy Slattery	PTS	10	Jan 1, 1926	19 years, 56 days	Broadway Auditorium, Buffalo, New York, U.S.	
48	Win	28–4–5 (11)	Noel McCormick	TKO	10 (10)	Nov 23, 1925	19 years, 17 days	Uptown Lenox S.C., New York City, New York, U.S.	
47	Win	27–4–5 (11)	Allentown Joe Gans	DQ	6 (10)	Nov 11, 1925	19 years, 5 days	Arena, Syracuse, New York, U.S.	
46	Win	26–4–5 (11)	Joe Silvani	KO	9 (10)	Nov 2, 1925	18 years, 361 days	Lenox A.C., New York City, New York, U.S.	
45	Loss	25–4–5 (11)	Tommy West	NWS	10	Oct 12, 1925	18 years, 340 days	Arena, Trenton, New Jersey, U.S.	
44	Loss	25–4–5 (10)	Jimmy Slattery	UD	6	Aug 22, 1925	18 years, 289 days	Coney Island Stadium, New York City, New York, U.S.	
43	Win	25–3–5 (10)	George Courtney	PTS	6	Aug 4, 1925	18 years, 271 days	Coney Island Stadium, New York City, New York, U.S.	
42	Loss	24–3–5 (10)	Harry Greb	NWS	10	Jul 16, 1925	18 years, 252 days	Taylor Bowl, Newburgh Heights, Ohio, U.S.	
41	Win	24–3–5 (9)	Jack DeMave	NWS	10	Jul 3, 1925	18 years, 239 days	Ocean Park Casino, Long Branch, New Jersey, U.S.	
40	Loss	24–3–5 (8)	Red Uhlan	PTS	4	Jun 17, 1925	18 years, 223 days	Auditorium, Oakland, California, U.S.	
39	Draw	24–2–5 (8)	Young Johnny Burns	PTS	8	May 27, 1925	18 years, 202 days	National Hall, San Francisco, California, U.S.	
38	Win	24–2–4 (8)	Sal Carlo	PTS	4	May 13, 1925	18 years, 188 days	Auditorium, Oakland, California, U.S.	
37	Draw	23–2–4 (8)	Sal Carlo	PTS	4	May 6, 1925	18 years, 181 days	Auditorium, Oakland, California, U.S.	
36	Draw	23–2–3 (8)	Tiger Jack Payne	PTS	4	Apr 22, 1925	18 years, 167 days	Auditorium, Oakland, California, U.S.	
35	Win	23–2–2 (8)	Karl Johnson	PTS	6	Mar 11, 1925	18 years, 125 days	Manhattan Casino, New York City, New York, U.S.	
34	Win	22–2–2 (8)	Hambone Kelly	PTS	6	Mar 3, 1925	18 years, 117 days	Pioneer Sporting Club, New York City, New York, U.S.	
33	Win	21–2–2 (8)	Karl Johnson	PTS	6	Feb 18, 1925	18 years, 104 days	Manhattan Casino, New York City, New York, U.S.	
32	Draw	20–2–2 (8)	Yale Okun	PTS	6	Feb 13, 1925	18 years, 99 days	Madison Square Garden, New York City, New York, U.S.	
31	Win	20–2–1 (8)	Joe Silvani	PTS	6	Jan 27, 1925	18 years, 82 days	Pioneer Sporting Club, New York City, New York, U.S.	
30	Win	19–2–1 (8)	Joe McCartney	KO	4 (12)	Jan 19, 1925	18 years, 74 days	Laurel Garden, Newark, New Jersey, U.S.	
29	Win	18–2–1 (8)	Tommy West	NWS	10	Jan 1, 1925	18 years, 56 days	Arena, Trenton, New Jersey, U.S.	
28	Win	18–2–1 (7)	Johnny Mercedes	PTS	6	Dec 16, 1924	18 years, 40 days	Pioneer Sporting Club, New York City, New York, U.S.	
27	Win	17–2–1 (7)	Rocky Smith	NWS	10	Dec 8, 1924	18 years, 32 days	Arena, Trenton, New Jersey, U.S.	
26	Win	17–2–1 (6)	Jimmy Amato	PTS	6	Nov 18, 1924	18 years, 12 days	Pioneer Sporting Club, New York City, New York, U.S.	
25	Win	16–2–1 (6)	Jimmy Amato	PTS	6	Oct 31, 1924	17 years, 360 days	Pioneer Sporting Club, New York City, New York, U.S.	
24	Win	15–2–1 (6)	Tommy West	NWS	8	Oct 20, 1924	17 years, 349 days	Arena, Trenton, New Jersey, U.S.	
23	Win	15–2–1 (5)	Alex Gibbons	NWS	12	Sep 12, 1924	17 years, 311 days	Recreation Field, Plainfield, New Jersey, U.S.	
22	Win	15–2–1 (4)	Lew Ferry	NWS	10	Sep 5, 1924	17 years, 304 days	Boardwalk Arena, Long Branch, New Jersey, U.S.	
21	Win	15–2–1 (3)	Joe McCartney	NWS	12	Aug 1, 1924	17 years, 269 days	Ocean Park Casino, Long Branch, New Jersey, U.S.	
20	Win	15–2–1 (2)	Joe McCartney	NWS	10	Jul 18, 1924	17 years, 255 days	Ocean Park Casino, Long Branch, New Jersey, U.S.	
19	Win	15–2–1 (1)	Joe Magnante	KO	4 (6)	Jul 4, 1924	17 years, 241 days	Amusement Park, Monticello, New York, U.S.	
18	Win	14–2–1 (1)	Jack Fogarty	PTS	6	Jun 27, 1924	17 years, 234 days	Arena, Rockaway Beach, New York City, New York, U.S.	
17	Win	13–2–1 (1)	Frank Sweeney	TKO	6 (6)	Jun 13, 1924	17 years, 220 days	Arena, Rockaway Beach, New York City, New York, U.S.	
16	Win	12–2–1 (1)	Bruno Frattini	NWS	12	May 20, 1924	17 years, 196 days	Ocean Park Casino, Long Branch, New Jersey, U.S.	
15	Win	12–2–1	Jimmy Amato	PTS	6	May 20, 1924	17 years, 196 days	Pioneer Sporting Club, New York City, New York, U.S.	
14	Win	11–2–1	Jimmy Roberts	PTS	6	Apr 26, 1924	17 years, 172 days	Rink S.C., New York City, New York, U.S.	
13	Win	10–2–1	Jack Ford	PTS	6	Apr 17, 1924	17 years, 163 days	Columbus Hall, Yonkers, New York, U.S.	
12	Draw	9–2–1	Joe Silvani	PTS	6	Apr 7, 1924	17 years, 153 days	Lenox A.C., New York, U.S.	
11	Loss	9–2	Billy Vidabeck	PTS	6	Mar 22, 1924	17 years, 137 days	Ridgewood Grove, New York City, New York, U.S.	
10	Win	9–1	Sergeant Jack Lynch	PTS	6	Mar 11, 1924	17 years, 126 days	Pioneer Sporting Club, New York City, New York, U.S.	
9	Loss	8–1	Guardsman George West	PTS	4	Feb 5, 1924	17 years, 91 days	Pioneer Sporting Club, New York City, New York, U.S.	
8	Win	8–0	Patsy Yodice	PTS	6	Jan 19, 1924	17 years, 74 days	Ridgewood Grove, New York City, New York, U.S.	
7	Win	7–0	Jimmy Roberts	PTS	4	Jan 15, 1924	17 years, 70 days	Pioneer Sporting Club, New York City, New York, U.S.	
6	Win	6–0	Jack Stone	PTS	6	Dec 8, 1923	17 years, 32 days	Ridgewood Grove, New York City, New York, U.S.	
5	Win	5–0	Nick Scanlon	PTS	6	Nov 14, 1923	17 years, 8 days	Lenox A.C., New York, U.S.	
4	Win	4–0	Frankie Bartels	PTS	6	Nov 12, 1923	17 years, 6 days	Broadway Arena, New York City, New York, U.S.	
3	Win	3–0	Jack Rivers	KO	3 (4)	Nov 1, 1923	16 years, 360 days	Commonwealth Sporting Club, New York City, New York, U.S.	
2	Win	2–0	Joe Scogni	PTS	6	Oct 22, 1923	16 years, 350 days	Lenox A.C., New York, U.S.	
1	Win	1–0	Nick Scanlon	PTS	6	Oct 8, 1923	16 years, 336 days	Lenox A.C., New York, U.S.	

=== Unofficial record ===
298 fights	224 wins	44 losses
By knockout	19	2
By decision	200	42
By disqualification	5	0
Draws	28	
No contests	2	

Record with the inclusion of newspaper decisions in the win/loss/draw column.

No.	Result	Record	Opponent	Type	Round	Date	Age	Location	Notes
298	Win	224–44–28 (2)	Al Ettore	KO	3 (10)	Jun 26, 1938	31 years, 232 days	Gilmore Stadium, Los Angeles, California, U.S.	
297	Draw	223–44–28 (2)	Bob Pastor	PTS	10	Aug 5, 1938	31 years, 272 days	Gilmore Stadium, Los Angeles, California, U.S.	
296	Win	223–44–27 (2)	Lou Nova	PTS	10	Jun 3, 1938	31 years, 209 days	Gilmore Stadium, Los Angeles, California, U.S.	Won USA California heavyweight title
295	Win	222–44–27 (2)	Odell Polee	KO	5 (10)	May 28, 1938	31 years, 203 days	Lane Field, San Diego, California, U.S.	
294	Win	221–44–27 (2)	Cowboy Jay	PTS	6	Dec 16, 1937	31 years, 40 days	Hermosa Beach, California, U.S.	
293	Win	220–44–27 (2)	Al Bray	MD	10	Dec 7, 1937	31 years, 31 days	Olympic Auditorium, Los Angeles, California, U.S.	
292	Loss	219–44–27 (2)	Jimmy Adamick	KO	2 (10)	Nov 19, 1937	31 years, 13 days	Olympia Stadium, Detroit, Michigan, U.S.	
291	Win	219–43–27 (2)	Bob Nestell	PTS	10	Oct 12, 1937	30 years, 340 days	Olympic Auditorium, Los Angeles, California, U.S.	
290	Win	218–43–27 (2)	Nash Garrison	PTS	10	Sep 29, 1937	30 years, 327 days	Auditorium, Oakland, California, U.S.	
289	Win	217–43–27 (2)	Jimmy Adamick	PTS	10	Sep 17, 1937	30 years, 315 days	Olympia Stadium, Detroit, Michigan, U.S.	
288	Win	216–43–27 (2)	Johnny Erjavec	PTS	10	Jul 16, 1937	30 years, 252 days	Legion Stadium, Hollywood, California, U.S.	
287	Win	215–43–27 (2)	Lee Ramage	PTS	10	Jun 8, 1937	30 years, 214 days	Olympic Auditorium, Los Angeles, California, U.S.	
286	Loss	214–43–27 (2)	Alberto Santiago Lovell	PTS	10	Apr 27, 1937	30 years, 172 days	Olympic Auditorium, Los Angeles, California, U.S.	
285	Win	214–42–27 (2)	Roscoe Toles	PTS	10	Mar 29, 1937	30 years, 143 days	Olympia Stadium, Detroit, Michigan, U.S.	
284	Win	213–42–27 (2)	Tom Beaupre	PTS	10	Mar 11, 1937	30 years, 125 days	Sportatorium, Dallas, Texas, U.S.	
283	Win	212–42–27 (2)	Jack Kranz	PTS	8	Feb 9, 1937	30 years, 95 days	D.A.V. Arena, Modesto, California, U.S.	
282	Win	211–42–27 (2)	King Levinsky	PTS	10	Jan 5, 1937	30 years, 60 days	Olympic Auditorium, Los Angeles, California, U.S.	
281	Draw	210–42–27 (2)	Deacon Leo Kelly	PTS	15	Aug 15, 1936	29 years, 283 days	West Melbourne Stadium, Melbourne, Victoria, Australia	
280	Win	210–42–26 (2)	Deacon Leo Kelly	PTS	15	Jul 20, 1936	29 years, 257 days	Sydney Stadium, Sydney, New South Wales, Australia	
279	Win	209–42–26 (2)	George Simpson	TKO	3 (15)	Jun 8, 1936	29 years, 215 days	Sydney Stadium, Sydney, New South Wales, Australia	
278	Win	208–42–26 (2)	Johnny Sikes	PTS	10	Feb 12, 1936	29 years, 98 days	Legion Arena, Las Vegas, Nevada, U.S.	
277	Win	207–42–26 (2)	Charley Coates	PTS	10	Jan 28, 1936	29 years, 83 days	Olympic Auditorium, Los Angeles, California, U.S.	
276	Win	206–42–26 (2)	Tuffy Dial	PTS	10	Jan 17, 1936	29 years, 72 days	Madison Square Garden, Phoenix, Arizona, U.S.	
275	Win	205–42–26 (2)	John Henry Lewis	PTS	10	Nov 29, 1935	29 years, 23 days	Dreamland Auditorium, San Francisco, California, U.S.	
274	Draw	204–42–26 (2)	James Green	PTS	6	Nov 15, 1935	29 years, 9 days	Ventura A.C., Ventura, California, U.S.	
273	Win	204–42–25 (2)	Frank Rowsey	PTS	10	Nov 1, 1935	28 years, 360 days	Legion Stadium, Hollywood, California, U.S.	
272	Loss	203–42–25 (2)	Tiger Jack Fox	MD	10	Oct 11, 1935	28 years, 339 days	Armory, Spokane, Washington, U.S.	For inaugural USA Washington State light heavyweight title
271	Draw	203–41–25 (2)	Tiger Jack Fox	PTS	10	Sep 6, 1935	28 years, 304 days	Gonzaga Stadium, Spokane, Washington, U.S.	
270	Win	203–41–24 (2)	George Simpson	PTS	10	Aug 21, 1935	28 years, 288 days	Civic Auditorium, San Francisco, California, U.S.	
269	Win	202–41–24 (2)	Harold Murphy	PTS	8	Aug 16, 1935	28 years, 283 days	Chestnut St. Arena, Reno, Nevada, U.S.	
268	Loss	201–41–24 (2)	Hank Hankinson	PTS	10	Aug 12, 1935	28 years, 279 days	Auditorium, Oakland, California, U.S.	
267	Loss	201–40–24 (2)	Hank Hankinson	PTS	10	Jul 19, 1935	28 years, 255 days	Legion Stadium, Hollywood, California, U.S.	
266	Win	201–39–24 (2)	John Henry Lewis	PTS	10	Jul 17, 1935	28 years, 253 days	Auditorium, Oakland, California, U.S.	
265	Win	200–39–24 (2)	Abe Feldman	PTS	10	Jun 18, 1935	28 years, 224 days	Olympic Auditorium, Los Angeles, California, U.S.	
264	Win	199–39–24 (2)	Harold Murphy	PTS	6	Jun 13, 1935	28 years, 219 days	Ventura A.C., Ventura, California, U.S.	
263	Win	198–39–24 (2)	Ford Smith	PTS	10	Jun 7, 1935	28 years, 213 days	Legion Stadium, Hollywood, California, U.S.	
262	Win	197–39–24 (2)	Harold Murphy	PTS	6	May 22, 1935	28 years, 197 days	Wilmington Bowl, Wilmington, California, U.S.	
261	Win	196–39–24 (2)	Oscar Rankins	PTS	10	May 14, 1935	28 years, 189 days	Olympic Auditorium, Los Angeles, California, U.S.	
260	Win	195–39–24 (2)	Homer Brandeis	PTS	10	May 2, 1935	28 years, 177 days	Auditorium, Oakland, California, U.S.	
259	Win	194–39–24 (2)	Charley Massera	PTS	10	Apr 18, 1935	28 years, 163 days	Legion Stadium, Hollywood, California, U.S.	
258	Win	193–39–24 (2)	Frank Rowsey	PTS	10	Mar 15, 1935	28 years, 129 days	Legion Stadium, Hollywood, California, U.S.	
257	Win	192–39–24 (2)	Terris Hill	KO	3 (10)	Mar 1, 1935	28 years, 115 days	Madison Square Garden, Phoenix, Arizona, U.S.	
256	Win	191–39–24 (2)	Rosy Rosales	TKO	2 (10)	Feb 22, 1935	28 years, 108 days	Madison Square Garden, Phoenix, Arizona, U.S.	
255	Win	190–39–24 (2)	Bob Godwin	PTS	10	Feb 15, 1935	28 years, 101 days	Legion Stadium, Hollywood, California, U.S.	
254	Win	189–39–24 (2)	Johnny Miler	PTS	10	Feb 5, 1935	28 years, 91 days	Olympic Auditorium, Los Angeles, California, U.S.	
253	Win	188–39–24 (2)	Frank Rowsey	PTS	10	Jan 29, 1935	28 years, 84 days	Olympic Auditorium, Los Angeles, California, U.S.	
252	Win	187–39–24 (2)	Johnny Nelson	PTS	10	Jan 14, 1935	28 years, 69 days	Arena, Syracuse, New York, U.S.	
251	Win	186–39–24 (2)	Al Stillman	PTS	10	Jan 7, 1935	28 years, 62 days	Auditorium, Saint Joseph, Missouri, U.S.	
250	Win	185–39–24 (2)	Tony Shucco	UD	10	Dec 21, 1934	28 years, 45 days	Boston Garden, Boston, Massachusetts, U.S.	
249	Win	184–39–24 (2)	Al Gainer	PTS	12	Dec 3, 1934	28 years, 27 days	Arena, New Haven, Connecticut, U.S.	
248	Loss	183–39–24 (2)	Bob Olin	UD	15	Nov 16, 1934	28 years, 10 days	Madison Square Garden, New York, U.S.	Lost NYSAC and The Ring light heavyweight titles
247	Draw	183–38–24 (2)	Johnny Miler	NWS	10	Oct 22, 1934	27 years, 350 days	Coliseum, Des Moines, Iowa, U.S.	
246	Win	183–38–23 (2)	Deacon Leo Kelly	PTS	10	Oct 8, 1934	27 years, 336 days	Civic Auditorium, San Francisco, California, U.S.	
245	Win	182–38–23 (2)	Pietro Georgi	PTS	10	Aug 8, 1934	27 years, 275 days	Auditorium, Oakland, California, U.S.	
244	Loss	181–38–23 (2)	Lee Ramage	PTS	10	Jul 31, 1934	27 years, 267 days	Olympic Auditorium, Los Angeles, California, U.S.	
243	Loss	181–37–23 (2)	Lee Ramage	PTS	10	Jul 10, 1934	27 years, 246 days	Olympic Auditorium, Los Angeles, California, U.S.	
242	Draw	181–36–23 (2)	Lee Ramage	PTS	10	Jun 26, 1934	27 years, 232 days	Olympic Auditorium, Los Angeles, California, U.S.	
241	Win	181–36–22 (2)	Deacon Leo Kelly	PTS	10	Jun 15, 1934	27 years, 221 days	Bakersfield Arena, Bakersfield, California, U.S.	
240	Win	180–36–22 (2)	Maxie Maxwell	TKO	5 (10)	Jun 12, 1934	27 years, 218 days	Broadway Arena, Tucson, Arizona, U.S.	
239	Win	179–36–22 (2)	Young Sam Langford	PTS	10	Jun 8, 1934	27 years, 214 days	Madison Square Garden, Phoenix, Arizona, U.S.	
238	Win	178–36–22 (2)	Dutch Weimer	PTS	10	Jun 1, 1934	27 years, 207 days	Coliseum, San Diego, California, U.S.	
237	Loss	177–36–22 (2)	Mickey Walker	PTS	10	May 8, 1934	27 years, 183 days	Olympic Auditorium, Los Angeles, California, U.S.	
236	Draw	177–35–22 (2)	Al Gainer	PTS	10	Apr 23, 1934	27 years, 168 days	Arena, New Haven, Connecticut, U.S.	
235	Loss	177–35–21 (2)	Clyde Chastain	PTS	10	Apr 16, 1934	27 years, 151 days	City Coliseum, Oklahoma City, Oklahoma, U.S.	
234	Win	177–34–21 (2)	Johnny Miler	SD	10	Apr 9, 1934	27 years, 154 days	Coliseum Arena, New Orleans, Louisiana, U.S.	
233	Win	176–34–21 (2)	Leroy Brown	PTS	10	Mar 22, 1934	27 years, 136 days	Sullivan's Bowl, Charleston, South Carolina, U.S.	
232	Win	175–34–21 (2)	Cyclone Smith	PTS	10	Mar 15, 1934	27 years, 129 days	Municipal Auditorium, Macon, Georgia, U.S.	
231	Win	174–34–21 (2)	Gordon Fortenberry	UD	10	Mar 12, 1934	27 years, 126 days	Auditorium, Orlando, Florida, U.S.	
230	Draw	173–34–21 (2)	Joe Knight	PTS	15	Feb 5, 1934	27 years, 91 days	Madison Square Garden Stadium, Miami, Florida, U.S.	Retained NYSAC, NBA, and The Ring light heavyweight titles
229	Loss	173–34–20 (2)	Bob Godwin	PTS	12	Jan 11, 1934	27 years, 66 days	Dixie Theatre, West Palm Beach, Florida, U.S.	
228	Draw	173–33–20 (2)	Bob Godwin	SD	10	Dec 21, 1933	27 years, 45 days	Dixie Theatre, West Palm Beach, Florida, U.S.	
227	Loss	173–33–19 (2)	Charley Massera	SD	10	Dec 19, 1933	27 years, 43 days	Ridgewood Grove, New York City, New York, U.S.	
226	Win	173–32–19 (2)	Wilson Dunn	PTS	10	Dec 4, 1933	27 years, 28 days	Fort Worth, Texas, U.S.	
225	Draw	172–32–19 (2)	Clyde Chastain	PTS	10	Nov 28, 1933	27 years, 22 days	City Auditorium, Houston, Texas, U.S.	
224	Win	172–32–18 (2)	Mickey Walker	UD	15	Nov 3, 1933	26 years, 362 days	Madison Square Garden, New York City, New York, U.S.	Retained NYSAC, NBA, and The Ring light heavyweight titles
223	Draw	171–32–18 (2)	Clyde Chastain	PTS	10	Oct 16, 1933	26 years, 344 days	Soldiers and Sailors Memorial Auditorium, Chattanooga, Tennessee, U.S.	
222	Win	171–32–17 (2)	Rosy Rosales	PTS	10	Sep 28, 1933	26 years, 326 days	Liberty Hall, El Paso, Texas, U.S.	
221	Loss	170–32–17 (2)	Young Stribling	UD	10	Sep 22, 1933	26 years, 320 days	Sam Houston Hall, Houston, Texas, U.S.	
220	Win	170–31–17 (2)	Chuck Burns	PTS	10	Sep 19, 1933	26 years, 317 days	Fort Sam Houston Stadium, San Antonio, Texas, U.S.	
219	Win	169–31–17 (2)	Joe Rice	PTS	10	Sep 12, 1933	26 years, 310 days	Hotel Texas, Fort Worth, Texas, U.S.	
218	Win	168–31–17 (2)	Leroy Haynes	PTS	10	Aug 30, 1933	26 years, 297 days	Olympic Auditorium, Los Angeles, California, U.S.	
217	Win	167–31–17 (2)	Ernest Bendy	PTS	10	Aug 15, 1933	26 years, 282 days	Olympic Auditorium, Los Angeles, California, U.S.	
216	Win	166–31–17 (2)	Meyer Christner	TKO	6 (10)	Aug 8, 1933	26 years, 275 days	Olympic Auditorium, Los Angeles, California, U.S.	
215	Loss	165–31–17 (2)	John Henry Lewis	PTS	10	Jul 31, 1933	26 years, 267 days	Civic Auditorium, San Francisco, California, U.S.	
214	Draw	165–30–17 (2)	Fred Lenhart	PTS	10	Jul 20, 1933	26 years, 256 days	Greenwich Coliseum, Tacoma, Washington, U.S.	
213	Loss	165–30–16 (2)	John Henry Lewis	PTS	10	Jul 10, 1933	26 years, 246 days	Civic Auditorium, San Francisco, California, U.S.	
212	Win	165–29–16 (2)	Popper Stopper	PTS	10	Jun 20, 1933	26 years, 226 days	Leiperville Arena, Leiperville, Pennsylvania, U.S.	
211	Win	164–29–16 (2)	Buddy McArthur	PTS	10	Jun 2, 1933	26 years, 208 days	Clarksburg, West Virginia, U.S.	
210	Win	163–29–16 (2)	Nick Popicg	PTS	10	May 26, 1933	26 years, 201 days	Armory Arena, Charleston, West Virginia, U.S.	
209	Win	162–29–16 (2)	Charley Belanger	UD	10	May 8, 1933	26 years, 183 days	Dog Track, Jeffersonville, Indiana, U.S.	
208	Win	161–29–16 (2)	Harold Murphy	UD	10	Apr 28, 1933	26 years, 173 days	Shrine Mosque, Springfield, Illinois, U.S.	
207	Draw	160–29–16 (2)	Al Stillman	PTS	10	Apr 25, 1933	26 years, 170 days	Springfield, Illinois, U.S.	
206	Win	160–29–15 (2)	Martin Levandowski	UD	10	Apr 19, 1933	26 years, 164 days	Arena, Saint Louis, Missouri, U.S.	
205	Loss	159–29–15 (2)	Lou Scozza	SD	10	Apr 3, 1933	26 years, 148 days	Broadway Auditorium, Buffalo, New York, U.S.	
204	Win	159–28–15 (2)	Bob Godwin	TKO	4 (15)	Mar 24, 1933	26 years, 138 days	Madison Square Garden, New York City, New York, U.S.	Retained NYSAC and The Ring light heavyweight titles; Won NBA light heavyweight title
203	Win	158–28–15 (2)	Adolf Heuser	UD	15	Mar 10, 1933	26 years, 124 days	Madison Square Garden, New York City, New York, U.S.	Retained NYSAC and The Ring light heavyweight titles
202	Win	157–28–15 (2)	Al Stillman	PTS	15	Feb 22, 1933	26 years, 108 days	Arena, Saint Louis, Missouri, U.S.	
201	Win	156–28–15 (2)	Al Stillman	PTS	12	Jan 24, 1933	26 years, 79 days	Arena, Saint Louis, Missouri, U.S.	
200	Win	155–28–15 (2)	Chuck Burns	PTS	10	Jan 20, 1933	26 years, 75 days	Winston-Salem, North Carolina, U.S.	
199	Win	154–28–15 (2)	Billy Jones	PTS	10	Dec 29, 1932	26 years, 53 days	Chicago Stadium, Chicago, Illinois, U.S.	
198	Win	153–28–15 (2)	Jack Silva	PTS	10	Dec 20, 1932	26 years, 44 days	Armory, Albuquerque, New Mexico, U.S.	
197	Win	152–28–15 (2)	Leroy Haynes	PTS	10	Dec 16, 1932	26 years, 40 days	Dreamland Auditorium, San Francisco, California, U.S.	
196	Win	151–28–15 (2)	Tony Poloni	PTS	10	Dec 6, 1932	26 years, 30 days	Forman's Arena, San Jose, California, U.S.	
195	Win	150–28–15 (2)	Jack Silva	PTS	10	Dec 1, 1932	26 years, 25 days	Stockton, California, U.S.	
194	Win	149–28–15 (2)	Tony Poloni	PTS	10	Nov 23, 1932	26 years, 17 days	L Street Arena, Sacramento, California, U.S.	
193	Win	148–28–15 (2)	John Henry Lewis	PTS	10	Nov 16, 1932	26 years, 10 days	Civic Auditorium, San Francisco, California, U.S.	
192	Win	147–28–15 (2)	Tiger Jack Fox	PTS	10	Oct 17, 1932	25 years, 346 days	Memorial Hall, Dayton, Ohio, U.S.	
191	Win	146–28–15 (2)	Jack Redman	PTS	10	Oct 12, 1932	25 years, 341 days	Ebbets Field, New York City, New York, U.S.	
190	Win	145–28–15 (2)	Lou Scozza	UD	10	Sep 29, 1932	25 years, 328 days	Baseball Stadium, Montreal, Quebec, Canada	
189	Win	144–28–15 (2)	Jimmy Herman	UD	10	Sep 19, 1932	25 years, 318 days	Lakewood Park, Mahanoy City, Pennsylvania, U.S.	
188	Win	143–28–15 (2)	Natie Brown	PTS	10	Sep 14, 1932	25 years, 313 days	Twin City Arena, Laurel, Maryland, U.S.	
187	Draw	142–28–15 (2)	Bob Godwin	PTS	10	Aug 30, 1932	25 years, 298 days	Armory, Charlotte, North Carolina, U.S.	
186	Win	142–28–14 (2)	Bob Godwin	PTS	10	Aug 22, 1932	25 years, 290 days	Twin City Arena, Laurel, Maryland, U.S.	
185	Win	141–28–14 (2)	Joe Barlow	UD	10	Aug 2, 1932	25 years, 270 days	Fenway Park, Boston, Massachusetts, U.S.	
184	Win	140–28–14 (2)	Lou Scozza	MD	15	Jul 14, 1932	25 years, 251 days	Bison Stadium, Buffalo, New York, U.S.	Retained NYSAC and The Ring light heavyweight titles
183	Win	139–28–14 (2)	Martin Levandowski	PTS	10	Jun 30, 1932	25 years, 237 days	Grand Rapids, Michigan, U.S.	
182	Win	138–28–14 (2)	Sam Weiss	PTS	10	Jun 20, 1932	25 years, 227 days	Heywood Arena, West Springfield, Massachusetts, U.S.	
181	Loss	137–28–14 (2)	Tony Shucco	UD	10	Jun 14, 1932	25 years, 221 days	Fair Grounds Arena, Allentown, Pennsylvania, U.S.	
180	Win	137–27–14 (2)	Larry Johnson	PTS	10	Jun 8, 1932	25 years, 215 days	Greenlee Field, Pittsburgh, Pennsylvania, U.S.	
179	Win	136–27–14 (2)	Don "Red" Barry	PTS	10	May 23, 1932	25 years, 199 days	Twin City Arena, Laurel, Maryland, U.S.	
178	Win	135–27–14 (2)	Harry Ebbets	SD	10	May 16, 1932	25 years, 192 days	Eastern States Coliseum, West Springfield, Massachusetts, U.S.	
177	Win	134–27–14 (2)	Harry Fuller	PTS	10	May 11, 1932	25 years, 187 days	Arena, Niagara Falls, Canada	
176	Win	133–27–14 (2)	Lou Scozza	PTS	10	Apr 21, 1932	25 years, 167 days	I.M.A. Auditorium, Flint, Michigan, U.S.	
175	Win	132–27–14 (2)	Stanley Wellise	PTS	10	Apr 15, 1932	25 years, 161 days	Grand Rapids, Michigan, U.S.	
174	Win	131–27–14 (2)	Willie Oster	PTS	12	Mar 21, 1932	25 years, 136 days	Biscayne Arena, Miami, Florida, U.S.	
173	Loss	130–27–14 (2)	Joe Knight	PTS	10	Mar 18, 1932	25 years, 133 days	Daytona Beach, Florida, U.S.	
172	Draw	130–26–14 (2)	Bob Godwin	PTS	10	Feb 17, 1932	25 years, 103 days	National Guard Arena, Daytona Beach, Florida, U.S.	
171	Win	130–26–13 (2)	Gordon Fortenberry	PTS	10	Jan 26, 1932	25 years, 81 days	Legion Arena, West Palm Beach, Florida, U.S.	
170	Win	129–26–13 (2)	Frankie Wine	PTS	10	Jan 15, 1932	25 years, 70 days	Coliseum, Coral Gables, Florida, U.S.	
169	Loss	128–26–13 (2)	Dave Maier	SD	10	Jan 1, 1932	25 years, 56 days	Auditorium, Milwaukee, Wisconsin, U.S.	
168	Win	128–25–13 (2)	Cyclone Smith	PTS	10	Dec 17, 1931	25 years, 41 days	Savannah, Georgia, U.S.	
167	NC	127–25–13 (2)	James J. Braddock	NC	2 (10)	Nov 10, 1931	25 years, 4 days	Auditorium, Minneapolis, Minnesota, U.S.	
166	Win	127–25–13 (1)	Battling Bozo	UD	12	Nov 2, 1931	24 years, 361 days	Convention Hall, Kansas City, Missouri, U.S.	
165	Win	126–25–13 (1)	Russ Rowsey	PTS	10	Oct 26, 1931	24 years, 354 days	Sullivan's Bowl, Charleston, Maryland, U.S.	
164	Win	125–25–13 (1)	Dick Daniels	KO	7 (10)	Oct 20, 1931	24 years, 348 days	Auditorium, Minneapolis, Minnesota, U.S.	
163	Draw	124–25–13 (1)	Battling Bozo	PTS	10	Sep 22, 1931	24 years, 320 days	City Auditorium, Atlanta, Georgia, U.S.	
162	Win	124–25–12 (1)	Owen Phelps	NWS	10	Sep 14, 1931	24 years, 312 days	Coliseum, Des Moines, Iowa, U.S.	
161	Win	123–25–12 (1)	Jimmy Slattery	UD	15	Aug 5, 1931	24 years, 272 days	Ebbets Field, New York City, New York, U.S.	Retained NYSAC and The Ring light heavyweight titles
160	Loss	122–25–12 (1)	George Manley	UD	10	Jul 22, 1931	24 years, 258 days	City Auditorium, Denver, Colorado, U.S.	
159	Win	122–24–12 (1)	Joe Banovic	UD	10	Jul 9, 1931	24 years, 245 days	Watres Armory, Scranton, Pennsylvania, U.S.	
158	Win	121–24–12 (1)	Billy Jones	PTS	10	Jun 29, 1931	24 years, 235 days	Arena Stadium, Philadelphia, Pennsylvania, U.S.	
157	Win	120–24–12 (1)	Charley Belanger	PTS	10	Jun 15, 1931	24 years, 221 days	Arena Gardens, Toronto, Canada	
156	Win	119–24–12 (1)	Fred Lenhart	PTS	10	Jun 2, 1931	24 years, 208 days	Punch Bowl Arena, Alan, Idaho, U.S.	
155	Win	118–24–12 (1)	Don Petrin	PTS	10	May 15, 1931	24 years, 190 days	Legion Stadium, Hollywood, California, U.S.	
154	Win	117–24–12 (1)	Leo Lomski	PTS	10	May 5, 1931	24 years, 180 days	Auditorium, Portland, Oregon, U.S.	
153	Loss	116–24–12 (1)	George Manley	SD	10	Apr 30, 1931	24 years, 175 days	Stockyards Stadium, Denver, Colorado, U.S.	
152	Loss	116–23–12 (1)	Billy Jones	SD	10	Apr 6, 1931	24 years, 151 days	Motor Square Garden, Pittsburgh, Pennsylvania, U.S.	
151	Win	116–22–12 (1)	Joe Banovic	UD	10	Mar 19, 1931	24 years, 133 days	Watres Armory, Scranton, Pennsylvania, U.S.	
150	Win	115–22–12 (1)	Marty Gallagher	PTS	8	Mar 5, 1931	24 years, 119 days	Madison Square Garden Stadium, Miami, Florida, U.S.	
149	Win	114–22–12 (1)	Tony Cancela	NWS	10	Feb 20, 1931	24 years, 106 days	Benjamin Field Arena, Tampa, Florida, U.S.	
148	Draw	113–22–12 (1)	Battling Bozo	NWS	10	Feb 9, 1931	24 years, 95 days	City Auditorium, Birmingham, Alabama, U.S.	
147	Win	113–22–11 (1)	Gene McCue	KO	3 (8)	Jan 27, 1931	24 years, 82 days	Columbus Hall, Stamford, Connecticut, U.S.	
146	Win	112–22–11 (1)	Gene McCue	PTS	8	Jan 16, 1931	24 years, 71 days	Armory, Hackensack, New Jersey, U.S.	
145	NC	111–22–11 (1)	Paul Swiderski	NC	7 (10)	Dec 2, 1930	24 years, 26 days	Arena, Saint Louis, Missouri, U.S.	
144	Win	111–22–11	Patsy Perroni	NWS	10	Nov 24, 1930	24 years, 18 days	Canton Auditorium, Canton, Ohio, U.S.	
143	Win	110–22–11	Abie Bain	TKO	11 (15)	Oct 22, 1930	23 years, 350 days	Madison Square Garden, New York City, New York, U.S.	Retained NBA, NYSAC, and The Ring light heavyweight titles
142	Win	109–22–11	Battling Bozo	NWS	10	Sep 29, 1930	23 years, 327 days	Legion Field, Birmingham, Alabama, U.S.	
141	Draw	108–22–11	Leo Lomski	PTS	8	Aug 21, 1930	23 years, 288 days	Electric Park, Hoquiam, Washington, U.S.	
140	Win	108–22–10	Willard Dix	PTS	10	Aug 4, 1930	23 years, 271 days	Auditorium, Oakland, California, U.S.	
139	Win	107–22–10	Jimmy Slattery	SD	15	Jun 25, 1930	23 years, 231 days	Bison Stadium, Buffalo, New York, U.S.	Won NYSAC and vacant The Ring light heavyweight titles
138	Win	106–22–10	George Hoffman	UD	10	Jun 3, 1930	23 years, 209 days	Queensboro Stadium, Long Island City, New York City, New York, U.S.	
137	Win	105–22–10	Larry Johnson	UD	10	Apr 30, 1930	23 years, 175 days	Madison Square Garden, New York City, New York, U.S.	
136	Win	104–22–10	Harry Fuller	PTS	10	Apr 7, 1930	23 years, 152 days	Broadway Auditorium, Buffalo, New York City, New York, U.S.	
135	Win	103–22–10	Larry Johnson	DQ	6 (10)	Mar 10, 1930	23 years, 124 days	Madison Square Garden, New York City, New York, U.S.	
134	Win	102–22–10	Ace Hudkins	UD	10	Feb 14, 1930	23 years, 100 days	Madison Square Garden, New York City, New York, U.S.	
133	Win	101–22–10	Leo Lomski	UD	10	Jan 3, 1930	23 years, 58 days	Madison Square Garden, New York City, New York, U.S.	
132	Win	100–22–10	Yale Okun	PTS	12	Dec 9, 1929	23 years, 33 days	Madison Square Garden, New York City, New York, U.S.	
131	Win	99–22–10	Leo Williams	PTS	10	Nov 30, 1929	23 years, 24 days	Olympia Boxing Club, New York City, New York, U.S.	
130	Loss	98–22–10	Jimmy Slattery	MD	10	Nov 25, 1929	23 years, 19 days	Broadway Auditorium, Buffalo, New York City, New York, U.S.	
129	Win	98–21–10	James J. Braddock	PTS	10	Nov 15, 1929	23 years, 9 days	Madison Square Garden, New York City, New York, U.S.	
128	Win	97–21–10	Joe Sekyra	PTS	10	Oct 21, 1929	22 years, 349 days	Madison Square Garden, New York City, New York, U.S.	
127	Win	96–21–10	Jimmy Slattery	PTS	10	Oct 14, 1929	22 years, 342 days	Arena, Philadelphia, Pennsylvania, U.S.	
126	Win	95–21–10	Tiger Jack Payne	PTS	10	Sep 28, 1929	22 years, 326 days	Olympia Boxing Club, New York City, New York, U.S.	
125	Win	94–21–10	Hale K.O. Brown	PTS	10	Sep 10, 1929	22 years, 308 days	Meyers Bowl, North Braddock, Pennsylvania, U.S.	
124	Win	93–21–10	Cuban Bobby Brown	PTS	10	Aug 29, 1929	22 years, 296 days	American Legion Arena, Franklin, New Hampshire, U.S.	
123	Win	92–21–10	Harry Martone	PTS	10	Aug 28, 1929	22 years, 295 days	Bayonne, New Jersey, U.S.	
122	Win	91–21–10	Tiger Jack Payne	DQ	8 (10)	Aug 24, 1929	22 years, 291 days	Coney Island Stadium, New York City, New York, U.S.	
121	Win	90–21–10	Leo Williams	TKO	9 (10)	Aug 16, 1929	22 years, 283 days	Playland Stadium, Rockaway Beach, New York City, New York, U.S.	
120	Win	89–21–10	Harry Dillon	UD	10	Jul 30, 1929	22 years, 266 days	Auditorium, Portland, Oregon, U.S.	
119	Loss	88–21–10	Fred Lenhart	SD	10	Jul 19, 1929	22 years, 255 days	Punch Bowl Arena, Alan, Idaho, U.S.	
118	Win	88–20–10	Willie Feldman	PTS	6	Jul 12, 1929	22 years, 248 days	Hoquiam, Washington, U.S.	
117	Win	87–20–10	Joe Anderson	UD	10	Jul 4, 1929	22 years, 240 days	Vaughn Street Park, Portland, Oregon, U.S.	
116	Win	86–20–10	Joe Anderson	PTS	10	Jun 18, 1929	22 years, 224 days	Redland Field, Cincinnati, Ohio, U.S.	
115	Win	85–20–10	Charley Belanger	PTS	10	Apr 26, 1929	22 years, 140 days	Chicago Stadium, Chicago, Illinois, U.S.	
114	Win	84–20–10	Joe Anderson	UD	10	Apr 3, 1929	22 years, 148 days	Music Hall Arena, Cincinnati, Ohio, U.S.	
113	Win	83–20–10	Cuban Bobby Brown	PTS	10	Mar 22, 1929	22 years, 136 days	Alhambra, Syracuse, New York, U.S.	
112	Win	82–20–10	Leo Lomski	UD	10	Mar 18, 1929	22 years, 132 days	Arena, Philadelphia, Pennsylvania, U.S.	
111	Win	81–20–10	Osk Till	PTS	10	Mar 11, 1929	22 years, 125 days	Madison Square Garden, New York City, New York, U.S.	
110	Win	80–20–10	Garfield Johnson	PTS	6	Mar 4, 1929	22 years, 118 days	Broadway Auditorium, Buffalo, New York, U.S.	
109	Win	79–20–10	Garfield Johnson	UD	10	Feb 19, 1929	22 years, 105 days	South Main Street Armory, Wilkes-Barre, Pennsylvania, U.S.	
108	Win	78–20–10	Jack McVey	PTS	10	Jan 26, 1929	22 years, 81 days	Convention Hall, Rochester, New York, U.S.	
107	Win	77–20–10	Osk Till	PTS	10	Dec 26, 1928	22 years, 50 days	Broadway Auditorium, Buffalo, New York, U.S.	
106	Win	76–20–10	Tiger Thomas	PTS	8	Nov 26, 1928	22 years, 20 days	Elks Club, Williamsport, Pennsylvania, U.S.	
105	Win	75–20–10	Cuban Bobby Brown	PTS	10	Nov 22, 1928	22 years, 16 days	Oakland Arena, Jersey City, New Jersey, U.S.	
104	Win	74–20–10	Garfield Johnson	PTS	10	Oct 22, 1928	21 years, 351 days	Motor Square Garden, Pittsburgh, Pennsylvania, U.S.	
103	Win	73–20–10	Tiger Jack Payne	PTS	10	Oct 11, 1928	21 years, 340 days	Madison Square Garden, New York City, New York, U.S.	
102	Win	72–20–10	Homer Robertson	PTS	10	Sep 10, 1928	21 years, 309 days	American Legion Stadium, West Springfield, Massachusetts, U.S.	
101	Draw	71–20–10	Leo Lomski	PTS	10	Aug 24, 1928	21 years, 292 days	Ocean View A.A., Long Branch, New Jersey, U.S.	
100	Win	71–20–9	Harry Martone	PTS	10	Aug 3, 1928	21 years, 271 days	Ocean View A.A., Long Branch, New Jersey, U.S.	
99	Win	70–20–9	Ted "Kid" Lewis	DQ	6 (15)	Jul 31, 1928	21 years, 268 days	Queensboro Stadium, Long Island City, New York City, New York, U.S.	
98	Loss	69–20–9	Lou Scozza	MD	10	Jul 27, 1928	21 years, 264 days	Stockyards Stadium, Denver, Colorado, U.S.	
97	Win	69–19–9	Roland Todd	PTS	15	Jun 17, 1928	21 years, 224 days	Premierland, Whitechapel, London, England	
96	Loss	68–19–9	Tommy Milligan	KO	9 (15)	Jun 4, 1928	21 years, 211 days	Royal Albert Hall, Kensington, London, England	
95	Draw	68–18–9	Frankie Schoell	PTS	10	Mar 20, 1928	21 years, 135 days	South Main Street Armory, Wilkes-Barre, Pennsylvania, U.S.	
94	Win	68–18–8	Cuban Bobby Brown	PTS	10	Mar 5, 1928	21 years, 120 days	Motor Square Garden, Pittsburgh, Pennsylvania, U.S.	
93	Win	67–18–8	Willie Walker	PTS	4	Feb 23, 1928	21 years, 109 days	Broadway Arena, New York City, New York, U.S.	
92	Win	66–18–8	Jack McVey	PTS	8	Feb 17, 1928	21 years, 103 days	Madison Square Garden, New York City, New York, U.S.	
91	Loss	65–18–8	Pete Latzo	PTS	10	Feb 6, 1928	21 years, 92 days	South Main Street Armory, Wilkes-Barre, Pennsylvania, U.S.	
90	Win	65–17–8	Phil Kaplan	PTS	8	Feb 3, 1928	21 years, 89 days	Madison Square Garden, New York City, New York, U.S.	
89	Win	64–17–8	Dick Evans	PTS	10	Jan 20, 1928	21 years, 75 days	Convention Hall, Rochester, New York, U.S.	
88	Win	63–17–8	Garfield Johnson	UD	10	Jan 9, 1928	21 years, 64 days	Motor Square Garden, Pittsburgh, Pennsylvania, U.S.	
87	Win	62–17–8	Frankie Schoell	NWS	10	Jan 2, 1928	21 years, 57 days	Music Hall Arena, Cincinnati, Ohio, U.S.	
86	Loss	61–17–8	Joe Anderson	NWS	10	Dec 12, 1927	21 years, 36 days	Music Hall Arena, Cincinnati, Ohio, U.S.	
85	Win	61–16–8	Pete Latzo	SD	10	Nov 21, 1927	21 years, 15 days	Arena, Philadelphia, Pennsylvania, U.S.	
84	Loss	60–16–8	Jock Malone	NWS	10	Nov 15, 1927	21 years, 9 days	Auditorium, Saint Paul, Minnesota, U.S.	
83	Draw	60–15–8	Tiger Flowers	PTS	10	Nov 9, 1927	21 years, 3 days	Olympia Stadium, Detroit, Michigan, U.S.	
82	Win	60–15–7	Homer Robertson	PTS	10	Oct 17, 1927	20 years, 345 days	Motor Square Garden, Pittsburgh, Pennsylvania, U.S.	
81	Loss	59–15–7	Jimmy Slattery	PTS	10	Aug 30, 1927	20 years, 297 days	Velodrome, Hartford, Connecticut, U.S.	For vacant NBA light heavyweight title
80	Loss	59–14–7	Lou Scozza	UD	10	Aug 20, 1927	20 years, 287 days	Bison Stadium, Buffalo, New York, U.S.	
79	Win	59–13–7	Bob Sage	PTS	10	Aug 4, 1927	20 years, 271 days	Mack Park, Detroit, Michigan, U.S.	
78	Win	58–13–7	Tony Marullo	PTS	10	Jul 26, 1927	20 years, 262 days	Queensboro Stadium, Long Island City, New York City, New York, U.S.	
77	Draw	57–13–7	Tiger Flowers	PTS	10	Jul 4, 1927	20 years, 240 days	Comiskey Park, Chicago, Illinois, U.S.	
76	Loss	57–13–6	Leo Lomski	UD	12	Jun 21, 1927	20 years, 227 days	Queensboro Stadium, Long Island City, New York City, New York, U.S.	
75	Win	57–12–6	Frankie Schoell	PTS	15	Apr 11, 1927	20 years, 156 days	Broadway Auditorium, Buffalo, U.S.	
74	Win	56–12–6	Willie Walker	PTS	12	Apr 2, 1927	20 years, 147 days	Walker A.C., New York City, New York, U.S.	
73	Loss	55–12–6	Young Stribling	PTS	10	Mar 17, 1927	20 years, 131 days	Mechanics Building, Boston, Massachusetts, U.S.	
72	Loss	55–11–6	Jimmy Delaney	NWS	10	Feb 14, 1927	20 years, 128 days	Music Hall Arena, Cincinnati, Ohio, U.S.	
71	Win	55–10–6	Benny Ross	PTS	10	Jan 26, 1927	20 years, 81 days	Broadway Auditorium, Buffalo, New York, U.S.	
70	Win	54–10–6	Phil Kaplan	UD	10	Dec 13, 1926	20 years, 37 days	Madison Square Garden, New York City, New York, U.S.	
69	Win	53–10–6	Tiger Flowers	DQ	9 (10)	Oct 15, 1926	19 years, 343 days	Mechanics Building, Boston, Massachusetts, U.S.	
68	Win	52–10–6	Johnny Wilson	UD	10	Oct 4, 1926	19 years, 332 days	Motor Square Garden, Pittsburgh, Pennsylvania, U.S.	
67	Loss	51–10–6	Frankie Schoell	UD	12	Sep 20, 1926	19 years, 318 days	Broadway Auditorium, Buffalo, New York, U.S.	
66	Win	51–9–6	Jimmy Francis	PTS	10	Sep 14, 1926	19 years, 312 days	Queensboro Stadium, Long Island City, New York City, New York, U.S.	
65	Win	50–9–6	Johnny Wilson	PTS	12	Aug 27, 1926	19 years, 294 days	Coney Island Stadium, New York City, New York, U.S.	
64	Win	49–9–6	Chuck Burns	PTS	10	Aug 19, 1926	19 years, 286 days	Madison Square Garden, New York City, New York, U.S.	
63	Win	48–9–6	Jamaica Kid	KO	6 (8)	Aug 6, 1926	19 years, 273 days	Ocean Park Casino, Long Branch, New Jersey, U.S.	
62	Win	47–9–6	Jamaica Kid	NWS	8	Jul 23, 1926	19 years, 259 days	Bacharach Ball Park, Atlantic City, New Jersey, U.S.	
61	Win	46–9–6	Lou Scozza	PTS	10	Jul 15, 1926	19 years, 251 days	Bison Stadium, Buffalo, New York, U.S.	
60	Win	45–9–6	Dave Shade	PTS	12	Jun 29, 1926	19 years, 235 days	Queensboro Stadium, Long Island City, New York City, New York, U.S.	
59	Win	44–9–6	Dave Shade	UD	10	Jun 5, 1926	19 years, 211 days	Queensboro Stadium, Long Island City, New York City, New York, U.S.	
58	Win	43–9–6	Tommy West	NWS	10	Apr 30, 1926	19 years, 175 days	Convention Hall, Camden, New Jersey, U.S.	
57	Win	42–9–6	Frankie Schoell	PTS	10	Apr 19, 1926	19 years, 164 days	Broadway Auditorium, Buffalo, New York, U.S.	
56	Loss	41–9–6	Jack Delaney	PTS	10	Mar 22, 1926	19 years, 136 days	Arena, Philadelphia, Pennsylvania, U.S.	
55	Win	41–8–6	Willie Walker	PTS	10	Mar 12, 1926	19 years, 126 days	Staten Island Coliseum, New York City, New York, U.S.	
54	Win	40–8–6	Rocky Smith	NWS	10	Feb 22, 1926	19 years, 108 days	Arena, Trenton, New Jersey, U.S.	
53	Win	39–8–6	Frank Moody	PTS	12	Feb 2, 1926	19 years, 88 days	Pioneer Sporting Club, New York City, New York, U.S.	
52	Draw	38–8–6	Frankie Schoell	PTS	10	Jan 25, 1926	19 years, 80 days	Broadway Auditorium, Buffalo, New York, U.S.	
51	Win	38–8–5	Rocky Smith	PTS	10	Jan 18, 1926	19 years, 73 days	Arena, Philadelphia, Pennsylvania, U.S.	
50	Loss	37–8–5	Art Weigand	PTS	6	Jan 11, 1926	19 years, 66 days	Broadway Auditorium, Buffalo, New York, U.S.	
49	Loss	37–7–5	Jimmy Slattery	PTS	10	Jan 1, 1926	19 years, 56 days	Broadway Auditorium, Buffalo, New York, U.S.	
48	Win	37–6–5	Noel McCormick	TKO	10 (10)	Nov 23, 1925	19 years, 17 days	Uptown Lenox S.C., New York City, New York, U.S.	
47	Win	36–6–5	Allentown Joe Gans	DQ	6 (10)	Nov 11, 1925	19 years, 5 days	Arena, Syracuse, New York, U.S.	
46	Win	35–6–5	Joe Silvani	KO	9 (10)	Nov 2, 1925	18 years, 361 days	Lenox A.C., New York City, New York, U.S.	
45	Loss	34–6–5	Tommy West	NWS	10	Oct 12, 1925	18 years, 340 days	Arena, Trenton, New Jersey, U.S.	
44	Loss	34–5–5	Jimmy Slattery	UD	6	Aug 22, 1925	18 years, 289 days	Coney Island Stadium, New York City, New York, U.S.	
43	Win	34–4–5	George Courtney	PTS	6	Aug 4, 1925	18 years, 271 days	Coney Island Stadium, New York City, New York, U.S.	
42	Loss	33–4–5	Harry Greb	NWS	10	Jul 16, 1925	18 years, 252 days	Taylor Bowl, Newburgh Heights, Ohio, U.S.	
41	Win	33–3–5	Jack DeMave	NWS	10	Jul 3, 1925	18 years, 239 days	Ocean Park Casino, Long Branch, New Jersey, U.S.	
40	Loss	32–3–5	Red Uhlan	PTS	4	Jun 17, 1925	18 years, 223 days	Auditorium, Oakland, California, U.S.	
39	Draw	32–2–5	Young Johnny Burns	PTS	8	May 27, 1925	18 years, 202 days	National Hall, San Francisco, California, U.S.	
38	Win	32–2–4	Sal Carlo	PTS	4	May 13, 1925	18 years, 188 days	Auditorium, Oakland, California, U.S.	
37	Draw	31–2–4	Sal Carlo	PTS	4	May 6, 1925	18 years, 181 days	Auditorium, Oakland, California, U.S.	
36	Draw	31–2–3	Tiger Jack Payne	PTS	4	Apr 22, 1925	18 years, 167 days	Auditorium, Oakland, California, U.S.	
35	Win	31–2–2	Karl Johnson	PTS	6	Mar 11, 1925	18 years, 125 days	Manhattan Casino, New York City, New York, U.S.	
34	Win	30–2–2	Hambone Kelly	PTS	6	Mar 3, 1925	18 years, 117 days	Pioneer Sporting Club, New York City, New York, U.S.	
33	Win	29–2–2	Karl Johnson	PTS	6	Feb 18, 1925	18 years, 104 days	Manhattan Casino, New York City, New York, U.S.	
32	Draw	28–2–2	Yale Okun	PTS	6	Feb 13, 1925	18 years, 99 days	Madison Square Garden, New York City, New York, U.S.	
31	Win	28–2–1	Joe Silvani	PTS	6	Jan 27, 1925	18 years, 82 days	Pioneer Sporting Club, New York City, New York, U.S.	
30	Win	27–2–1	Joe McCartney	KO	4 (12)	Jan 19, 1925	18 years, 74 days	Laurel Garden, Newark, New Jersey, U.S.	
29	Win	26–2–1	Tommy West	NWS	10	Jan 1, 1925	18 years, 56 days	Arena, Trenton, New Jersey, U.S.	
28	Win	25–2–1	Johnny Mercedes	PTS	6	Dec 16, 1924	18 years, 40 days	Pioneer Sporting Club, New York City, New York, U.S.	
27	Win	24–2–1	Rocky Smith	NWS	10	Dec 8, 1924	18 years, 32 days	Arena, Trenton, New Jersey, U.S.	
26	Win	23–2–1	Jimmy Amato	PTS	6	Nov 18, 1924	18 years, 12 days	Pioneer Sporting Club, New York City, New York, U.S.	
25	Win	22–2–1	Jimmy Amato	PTS	6	Oct 31, 1924	17 years, 360 days	Pioneer Sporting Club, New York City, New York, U.S.	
24	Win	21–2–1	Tommy West	NWS	8	Oct 20, 1924	17 years, 349 days	Arena, Trenton, New Jersey, U.S.	
23	Win	20–2–1	Alex Gibbons	NWS	12	Sep 12, 1924	17 years, 311 days	Recreation Field, Plainfield, New Jersey, U.S.	
22	Win	19–2–1	Lew Ferry	NWS	10	Sep 5, 1924	17 years, 304 days	Boardwalk Arena, Long Branch, New Jersey, U.S.	
21	Win	18–2–1	Joe McCartney	NWS	12	Aug 1, 1924	17 years, 269 days	Ocean Park Casino, Long Branch, New Jersey, U.S.	
20	Win	17–2–1	Joe McCartney	NWS	10	Jul 18, 1924	17 years, 255 days	Ocean Park Casino, Long Branch, New Jersey, U.S.	
19	Win	16–2–1	Joe Magnante	KO	4 (6)	Jul 4, 1924	17 years, 241 days	Amusement Park, Monticello, New York, U.S.	
18	Win	15–2–1	Jack Fogarty	PTS	6	Jun 27, 1924	17 years, 234 days	Arena, Rockaway Beach, New York City, New York, U.S.	
17	Win	14–2–1	Frank Sweeney	TKO	6 (6)	Jun 13, 1924	17 years, 220 days	Arena, Rockaway Beach, New York City, New York, U.S.	
16	Win	13–2–1	Bruno Frattini	NWS	12	May 20, 1924	17 years, 196 days	Ocean Park Casino, Long Branch, New Jersey, U.S.	
15	Win	12–2–1	Jimmy Amato	PTS	6	May 20, 1924	17 years, 196 days	Pioneer Sporting Club, New York City, New York, U.S.	
14	Win	11–2–1	Jimmy Roberts	PTS	6	Apr 26, 1924	17 years, 172 days	Rink S.C., New York City, New York, U.S.	
13	Win	10–2–1	Jack Ford	PTS	6	Apr 17, 1924	17 years, 163 days	Columbus Hall, Yonkers, New York, U.S.	
12	Draw	9–2–1	Joe Silvani	PTS	6	Apr 7, 1924	17 years, 153 days	Lenox A.C., New York, U.S.	
11	Loss	9–2	Billy Vidabeck	PTS	6	Mar 22, 1924	17 years, 137 days	Ridgewood Grove, New York City, New York, U.S.	
10	Win	9–1	Sergeant Jack Lynch	PTS	6	Mar 11, 1924	17 years, 126 days	Pioneer Sporting Club, New York City, New York, U.S.	
9	Loss	8–1	Guardsman George West	PTS	4	Feb 5, 1924	17 years, 91 days	Pioneer Sporting Club, New York City, New York, U.S.	
8	Win	8–0	Patsy Yodice	PTS	6	Jan 19, 1924	17 years, 74 days	Ridgewood Grove, New York City, New York, U.S.	
7	Win	7–0	Jimmy Roberts	PTS	4	Jan 15, 1924	17 years, 70 days	Pioneer Sporting Club, New York City, New York, U.S.	
6	Win	6–0	Jack Stone	PTS	6	Dec 8, 1923	17 years, 32 days	Ridgewood Grove, New York City, New York, U.S.	
5	Win	5–0	Nick Scanlon	PTS	6	Nov 14, 1923	17 years, 8 days	Lenox A.C., New York, U.S.	
4	Win	4–0	Frankie Bartels	PTS	6	Nov 12, 1923	17 years, 6 days	Broadway Arena, New York City, New York, U.S.	
3	Win	3–0	Jack Rivers	KO	3 (4)	Nov 1, 1923	16 years, 360 days	Commonwealth Sporting Club, New York City, New York, U.S.	
2	Win	2–0	Joe Scogni	PTS	6	Oct 22, 1923	16 years, 350 days	Lenox A.C., New York, U.S.	
1	Win	1–0	Nick Scanlon	PTS	6	Oct 8, 1923	16 years, 336 days	Lenox A.C., New York, U.S.	

== Titles in boxing ==
=== Major world titles ===
- NYSAC light heavyweight champion (175 lbs)
- NBA (WBA) light heavyweight champion (Note: Rosenbloom was first stripped of the title on June 6, 1931 and reinstated on March 24, 1933. He was subsequently stripped again on September 17, 1934.) (175 lbs) (2×)

=== The Ring magazine titles ===
- The Ring light heavyweight champion (175 lbs)

=== Regional/International titles ===
- California heavyweight champion (200+ lbs)

=== Undisputed titles ===
- Undisputed light heavyweight champion (2×)

== See also ==
- List of light heavyweight boxing champions
- List of select Jewish boxers
- The Timid Toreador, a 1940 animated short film pitting Porky Pig against "Slapsie Maxie Rosenbull"

== Notes and references ==
=== References ===
Achievements
Preceded by Jimmy Slattery	NYSAC light heavyweight champion June 25, 1930 – November 16, 1934	Bob Olin
Tommy Loughran; Vacated	The Ring light heavyweight champion June 25, 1930 – November 16, 1934	Bob Olin
Tommy Loughran; Vacated	NBA light heavyweight champion September, 1930 – June 06, 1931; Stripped	Vacant Title next held by George Nichols
Preceded by Bob Godwin	NBA light heavyweight champion March 24, 1933 – September 17, 1934; Stripped	Vacant Title next held by Bob Olin
