= Tiger Jack Fox =

American boxer (1907–1954)

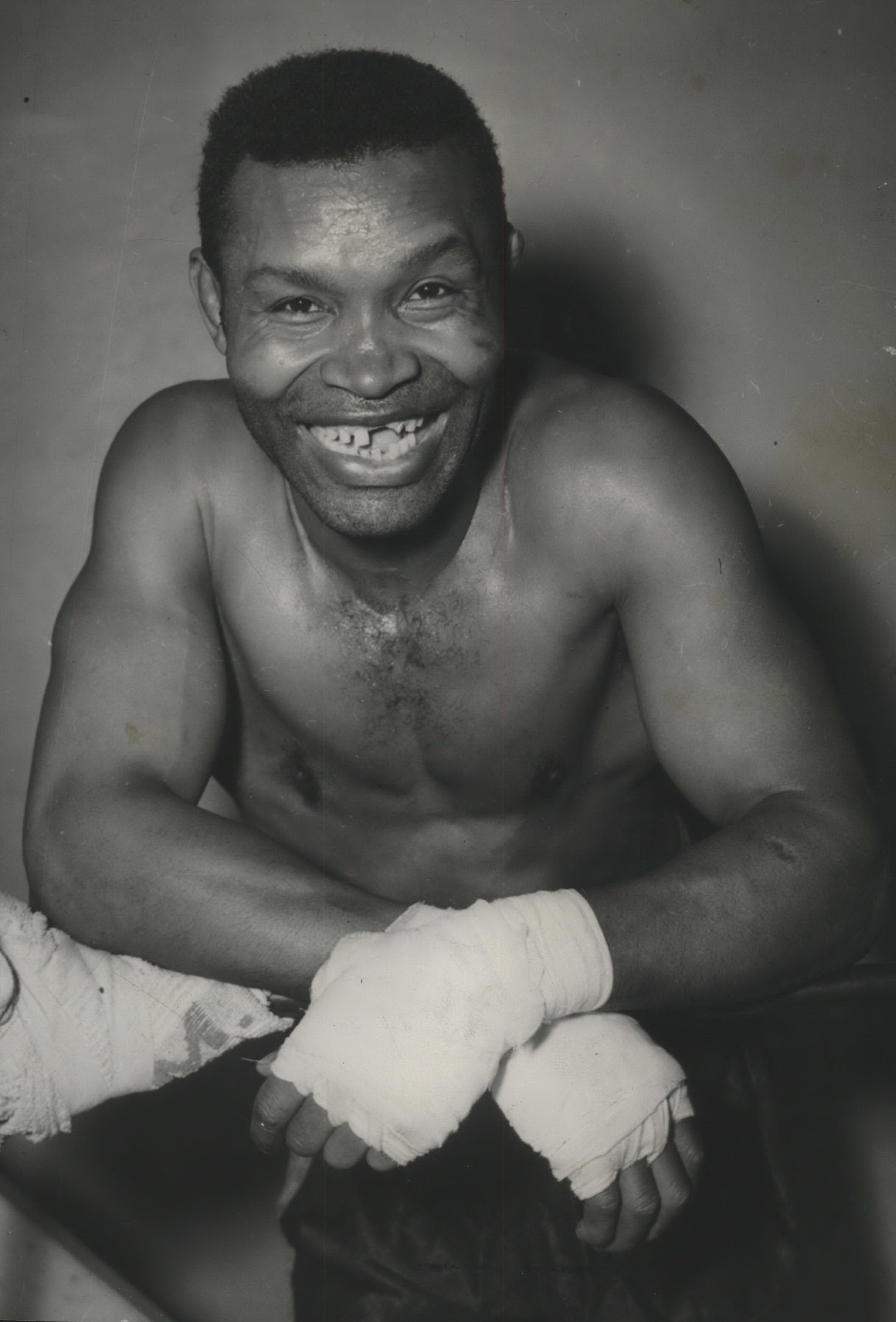
- Fox in 1944

Personal information
- Born: John Linwood Fox; April 2, 1907
- Died: April 6, 1954 (aged 47)
- Height: 5 ft 11 1/2 in (1.82 m)
- Weight: Light heavyweight

Boxing career
- Reach: 75 in (191 cm)
- Stance: Orthodox

Boxing record
- Total fights: 180
- Wins: 140
- Win by KO: 89
- Losses: 23
- Draws: 12
- No contests: 5

John Linwood Fox (April 2, 1907 – April 6, 1954), better known as Tiger Jack Fox was an American light heavyweight boxer, who fought from 1928 to 1950.

== Boxing career ==
Fox claimed he got his start in boxing when he was picked up while hitchhiking in Georgia by boxer Young Stribling. At that time, Stribling was travelling from town to town and engaging in boxing matches, and Fox took a job as a sparring partner.

In their first sparring session, Stribling knocked Fox out with a right hand to the jaw. Fox claimed he didn't sleep that night, reliving the events of the day and studying how to avoid a similar fate the next day. The next day, the two sparred again. Fox won the fight, and was fired as a sparring partner.

Fox then moved to Indianapolis, where he hung around a boxing gym until he was offered a fight. Fox accepted and was on his way. He relocated to Terre Haute, Indiana to train under Bud Taylor and became the "Indiana colored heavyweight champion". He fought frequently for the next nine years without losing. His first loss was to Maxie Rosenbloom. Fox claimed he engaged in over 300 fights, but many were not recorded. He claimed that he had never fought a preliminary bout in his career, just main events.

Fox was defeated by Melio Bettina in his only crack at the light heavyweight championship, New York States Athletic Commission version. In this elimination bout to name a champion, Fox was stopped in the 9th round. Two months before the fight, he was stabbed near the heart in a Harlem hotel in a dispute over a woman.

Fox also fought and knocked out Bob Olin in two rounds, and he knocked out Lou Brouillard in seven. He was knocked out in three rounds by John Henry Lewis.

Fox also won against Jersey Joe Walcott on May 12, 1937, knocking him out in the 8th round. In 1938, Fox again defeated Walcott, this time in the 10th round.

On April 5, 1954, Fox went to the El Rancho Theater on Main Avenue to catch the 25-cent triple feature (an almost daily routine), Fox collapsed and died in the entryway from a heart attack,

Fox is second on the all-time list for first-round knockouts, and was named to The Ring's list of 100 greatest punchers of all time.

Fox was posthumously inducted into the International Boxing Hall Of Fame in 2023, almost 70 years after his untimely death in the associations "Old Timers" category.
