= Bob Olin =

American boxer (1908–1956)

Personal information
- Born: Robert Lous Olin; July 4, 1908 Brooklyn, New York, U.S.
- Died: December 16, 1956 (aged 48) Bronx, New York, U.S.
- Height: 5 ft 10 in (178 cm)
- Weight: Light heavyweight

Boxing career
- Reach: 72 in (183 cm)
- Stance: Orthodox

Boxing record
- Total fights: 86
- Wins: 55
- Win by KO: 25
- Losses: 27
- Draws: 4

Robert Lous Olin (July 4, 1908 – December 16, 1956) was an American boxer who became the World Light Heavyweight champion on November 16, 1934, against Maxie Rosenbloom at Madison Square Garden. He was trained by Ray Arcel and managed by Harold Scadron.

== Early life and career ==
Olin was born on July 4, 1908, to a Jewish family in New York's crowded Lower East Side, and raised in Brooklyn. Like several outstanding Jewish boxers of his era, he began boxing at the Lower East Side's Educational Alliance on East Broadway, a settlement house for Jewish immigrants from Eastern Europe. After graduating from Erasmus High, he attended Fordham Law School for two years while working as a messenger for a Wall Street brokerage office. Early in his boxing career, Olin continued to broker the sale of bonds as a side line.

Boxing as an amateur, Olin won the New York City Golden Gloves Light Heavyweight 175 lb (79 kg) Open Championship in 1928. On March 24, 1928, he competed in the Inter-City Golden Gloves Competition in Chicago. He won all 35 of his amateur fights, as well as the New York Metropolitan Amateur Athletic Union title, and turned professional in 1929.

=== Early career 1930-31 ===
On April 10, 1930, Olin defeated George LaRocco in a six-round points decision at Lennox Sporting Club in New York.

On June 3, 1930, Olin met Ralph Ficucello, a former 1929 New York Golden Gloves Heavyweight Champion, at Queensboro Stadium in Queens, New York. Though outweighed by 12 pounds, Olin pulled off the victory of the fellow Golden Gloves champion in an eight-round points decision.

On October 22, 1930, Olin bested Willard Dix in a hard-fought ten round points decision at New York's Madison Square Garden. Olin floored Dix for a nine count in the fourth and ninth rounds. In the rough match, Olin was down for nine in the fourth himself.

Olin took a ten-round decision against Joe Banovic near the end of 1930 at Madison Square Garden. It was a dull, close, mauling bout with little boxing or long range blows, and the decision was unpopular with many fans, but Banovic was an accomplished opponent and the win helped pave Olin's path toward a light heavyweight championship attempt

On July 27, 1931, Olin defeated Al Gainer, a determined World Light Heavyweight Championship contender, in a ten-round bout at White City Stadium in New Haven, Connecticut. Gainer led in the early rounds, but Olin came through in the ninth and tenth to win the referee's decision. A light rain hampered the outdoor match in the fifth and sixth rounds. From his corner, trainer Ray Arcel assisted Olin in the strategically fought bout.

=== 1931 NBA Light Heavy tournament ===
On December 18, 1931, Olin achieved a fourth-round knockout of Tait Littman in the opening round of the National Boxing Association World Light Heavyweight Tournament at Chicago Stadium. Olin's telling blow was a left hook delivered with Littman against the ropes. Twelve days later in the tournament's second round on December 30, Olin won over Cylde Chastain in a ten-round split decision. Though many in the crowd believed Chastain had outboxed Olin in the opening rounds, Olin was awarded the decision due to his strong finish in the closing rounds. In his final round of the tournament, Olin lost a ten-round decision to Baxter Calmes on January 15, 1932.

=== Lead up to the Light Heavy title, 1933-34 ===
On February 15, 1932, at New York's St. Nicholas Arena Olin broke his right hand placing three smashing rights to the jaw of Arthur Hittick in the first, and he lost the bout as a result. Though he managed to finish the bout, he was unable to use his right hand for uppercuts or to block as effectively, and Hittick countered with blows to the body in the remaining rounds.

Al Gainer handed Olin a disappointing loss in their third meeting on September 1, 1932, in a ten-round points decision at West Haven, Connecticut. Gainer gave Olin a "terrific battering during the last two rounds". Gainer was an aspiring Light Heavyweight Contender and a Connecticut State Light Heavyweight Champion with a strong punch and may have outpowered the lighter punching Olin this match. Regardless, Olin won in two of their four meetings and drew one. The battle was close until the ninth when a barrage of punches by Gainer left Olin nearly helpless, and with cuts below both eyes.

Olin took a six-round points decision on October 9, 1933, at Madison Square Garden against Black boxer Ed "Unknown" Winston. A right cross to the head sent Winston to the deck for a no count in the first, and he connected with fewer punches than he received in the rough rounds that followed.

On November 17, 1933, Olin just managed to win the decision in a hard-fought eight round bout with Charley Massera at Madison Square Garden. There were no knockdowns in the close match, but the close victory bolstered Olin's confidence after he failed to win the NBA Light Heavyweight Tournament.

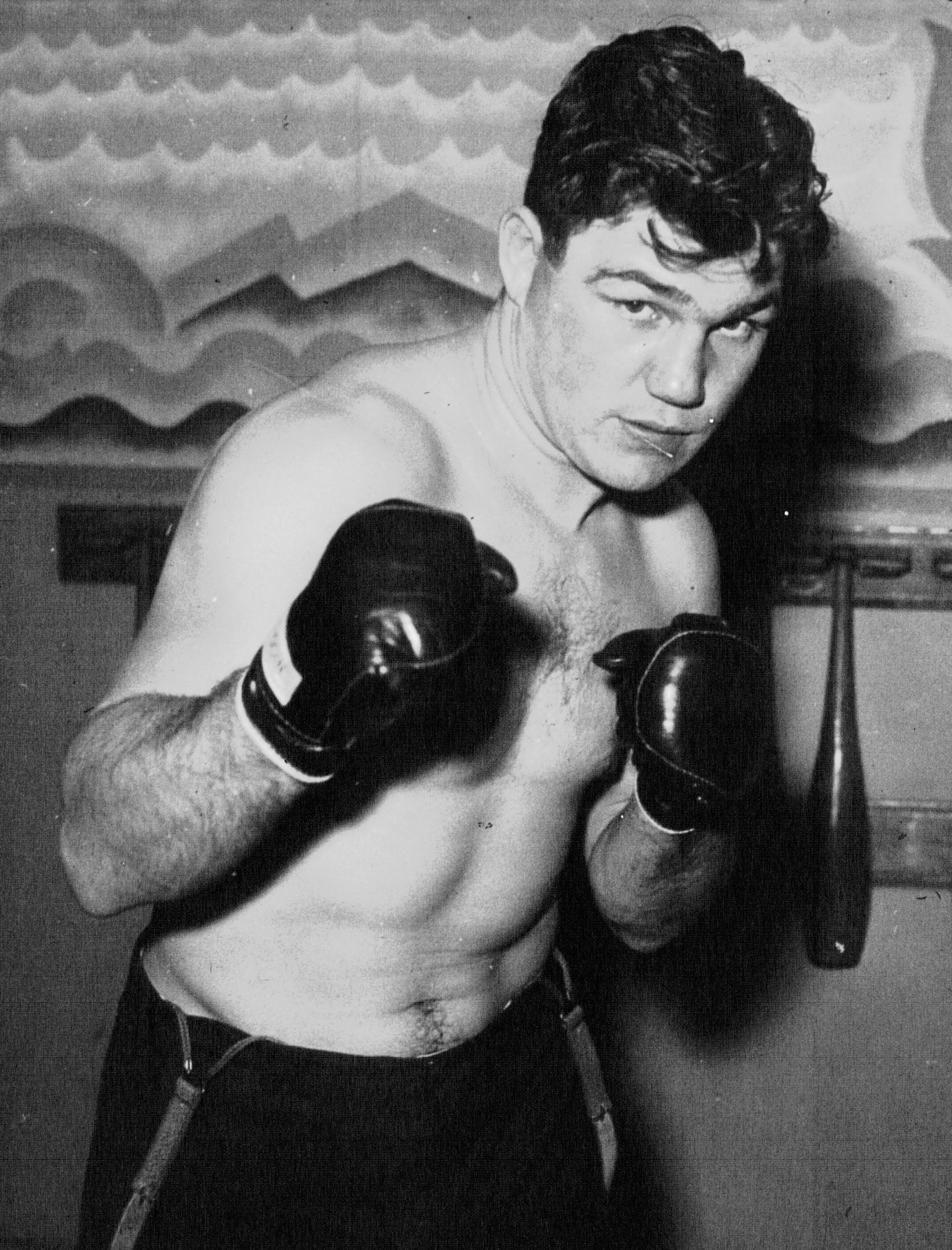
Welterweight Champ Lou Brouillard

Olin lost to Lou Brouillard, former National Boxing Association World Welterweight Champion, on January 19, 1934, in a ten-round split decision in New York's Madison Square Garden. Broulliard had lost his World Welterweight Title only a few months before meeting Olin, yet a depression era crowd of only 4,000 saw the bout at the Garden. Brouillard lost the second and fourth rounds from low blow fouls, but in the remaining rounds, he took the offensive and Olin had to hold or back away at times to remain in the fight. Late in the eighth, Olin scored with a few smashes to the head of Brouillard that only made Brouillard's fight harder in the following round. In the ninth, Olin was nearly doubled over from Brouilard's powerful blows to the body. In the close decision, Judge Jack Britton, former Welterweight Champion, dissented from the other judge and referee, and cast the only score sheet for Olin. On April 5, Olin lost to Brouillard for a final time in a ten-round points decision at the Arena in New Haven, Connecticut.

On May 25, 1934, Olin scored a TKO against Bob Godwin 50 seconds into the first round at Legion Stadium in Hollywood. Olin charged to the middle of the ring, and landed a left hook to the chin of Godwin only five seconds into the bout, immediately dropping him for a no count. Olin briefly floored him again after he arose. Godwin resumed fighting only to face a two fisted assault from Olin against the ropes that sank him to the canvas for the final time for a count of seven. After Godwin tentatively struggled to his feet, the referee stopped the bout. The win helped Olin recover his confidence from his losses to Brouillard.

== World Light Heavy title, 1934 ==
On November 16, 1934, he won the New York State Athletic Commission (NYSAC's) World Light Heavyweight championship in a listless, fifteen-round match before a modest crowd of 7300 from Maxie Rosenbloom at New York's famed Madison Square Garden. After fifteen dull rounds, Olin won the decision to an opponent who many ringside believed was totally disinterested in maintaining his title. A small amount of contact in the first round probably gave the points advantage to Rosenbloom, particularly since Olin was called for a low blow. Though there was limited real fighting in the first thirteen rounds, Olin was responsible for most of it, usually going to the body of his opponent. Rosenbloom was on the defensive until the last two or three rounds, when he opened up with a few brief slugging attacks. Both judges agreed with the verdict for Olin giving no more than four rounds to his opponent, but the referee sided for Rosenbloom, giving him eight rounds in the close match. The United Press added to the dissent from the boxing public by going against the official ruling, giving ten rounds to Rosenbloom, only four to Olin, with one even. The dullness of the bout caused some fans to suspect a fix, but the suspicion was never proven.

Boxing as Light Heavyweight Champion, Olin humbled Henry Firpo in a third-round knockout at the Convention Hall in Asbury Park, New Jersey on September 20, 1935. Firpo was unable to mount a defense against Olin's consistent blows to the body which nearly downed him by the end of the second round, though he was saved by the bell. He answered the third round's opening bell, but went down for the count with another harsh round of body blows from Olin. Firpo had been an unsuccessful participant in the November 1931, NBA Middleweight Championship elimination tournament in Milwaukee, though he won his first two rounds.

== Loss of Light Heavy title, 1935 ==
Olin lost his title to John Henry Lewis on October 31, 1935, in a fifteen-round unanimous decision at the Arena in St. Louis. Due to the depression and a lack of interest in the Light Heavyweight class, Olin's manager had a difficult time finding a promoter or an audience for the fight, finally settling on a payment of $15,000 to fight Lewis in St. Louis. The meager audience of 9,219 that showed on fight day could not provide enough in receipts to pay Olin half of what he was promised.

Olin's trainer Ray Arcel later wrote that Olin lost his nerve to fight Lewis the week before and had to be encouraged to change his mind up to the day of the match. His motivation may have temporarily been affected when he learned on fight day he would receive less than half of his promised purse. The fight, however, was spectacular, with Olin showing gameness throughout the fifteen rounds, though clearly outmatched by Lewis and taking a beating. Many in the crowd urged the referee to end the fight in the twelfth round, but Olin fought on. In his typical style, he came out charging and won the first two rounds with a significant margin in points. In the third, finding his range, Lewis battered Olin with precision lefts to the head and straight rights to the body. Both boxers punched with precision and skill, until the thirteenth when Lewis, struggling for a knockout, inadvertently struck Olin after the bell sounded. Faced with the "machine-like precision" of Lewis, Olin lost twelve rounds, while managing to keep two even. Olin, with the will of a former champion, courageously remained on his feet through the entire fifteen rounds, refusing to suffer a knockdown.

Following his title loss to Lewis, Olin lost to French boxer Al McCoy on December 10, 1935, in a crushing ten round points decision at the Forum in Montreal, Canada. Olin suffered severely at the hands of McCoy, with a barrage of blows to the body and head. He performed well in the opening rounds, but by the final two, he was reeling about the ring, and nearly out on his feet from the brutal attack of McCoy.

In one of his better late career matches as a fringe Heavyweight contender on April 2, 1936, Olin lost to Tommy Farr at Royal Albert Hall in Kensington, England in a fifteen-round points decision. His manager, and many in the crowd protested the decision, as Olin had knocked Farr to the mat twice for counts.

On January 15, 1937, Olin lost to black boxer Tiger Fox, Spokane native, in a second-round TKO at the Armory in Spokane, Washington. Olin took vicious blows to his head in the two round bout, and received a deep gash under his right eye, later requiring six stitches to close. This bruising defeat, his previous defeat to Canadian Al McCoy, and the bruising knockdowns he would suffer in his crushing rematch with Lewis the following June, likely accelerated his retirement from the ring, and robbed him of his ability to cope with top contenders.

=== Attempt to regain title, 1937 ===
In a rematch for the title with Lewis on June 3, 1937, Olin failed to regain the title, losing in an eighth-round TKO, before another small crowd of 12,000. Probably showing the wear of his years in the ring, he appeared more sluggish and lacked the speed he had shown in their former meeting. Suffering a broken rib on his left side early in the second round, Olin could not maintain his defense. He was on the mat for a count of nine from a right to the body in the fourth. In the sixth, Olin started the round with a few blows that had little effect on his opponent. In the eighth, Lewis put Olin to the floor again with blows to his ribs for a count of seven before he could rise and resume the match. Immediately after a right hand sent Olin to the floor again, the referee raised the hand of Lewis to end the fight. Olin received only $3,000 for his efforts, but was compensated an additional $1,800 by Lewis, who had promised him the rematch after their previous title fight.

== Declining boxing years ==
Olin won a decisive victory over Patsy Perroni on September 13, 1937, in a third-round technical knockout at the Convention Hall in Toldedo, Ohio. A sweeping left from Olin broke Perroni's jaw early in the third, and he was unable to resume the fight at the fourth round bell. It was the first knockout of Perroni's career.

On September 28, 1937, Olin lost a sixth-round TKO to Leroy Haynes at Convention Hall in Philadelphia due to a cut eye which was bleeding. The contest was a semi-final bout before a crowd of 9,000. In frustration with the ruling to end the hard-fought bout, and perhaps sensing the end of his boxing career from his recent losses, in an atypical breach of boxing etiquette Olin struggled with the referee to change the ruling. Olin's handlers were required to step in and separate the two men. His boxing record would make a distinct downturn after this bout, losing five of his remaining seven bouts.

Before a crowd of 4,200, on November 17, 1937, Olin lost to Johnny Risko, a respected heavyweight contender, in a ten-round points decision that showcased Risko's command of infighting. Risko was on the comeback trail after two years away from the ring, and was eager to demonstrate his dominance over the former champion. He effectively blocked the blows of Olin, who was beginning to show wear from several recent losses. The Associated Press gave Risko seven of the ten rounds with Olin taking the sixth and seventh, and the fourth remaining even.

== Later life ==
After eleven years of boxing, Olin retired from the ring in 1939, never attempting a comeback. In 1942, he enlisted in the Coast Guard and served in WWII. After returning from his service, he resumed his prior career working for a Wall Street brokerage.

Olin opened up his own restaurant in 1946 at 128 West 58th Street in New York but had to close it and another restaurant for lack of business. He gained far greater success and a bit of local fame when he moved his restaurant to Central Park West and 61st Street and renamed it "Bob Olin's on the Park".

In 1951, he was diagnosed with a heart ailment, and hospitalized once in his mid-40s. On December 16, 1956, at age 48, he died of a heart attack while driving a date to her home in the Bronx. He was married once and divorced, but left no children.

== Professional boxing record ==
86 fights	55 wins	27 losses
By knockout	25	4
By decision	29	23
By disqualification	1	0
Draws	4	

No.	Result	Record	Opponent	Type	Round, time	Date	Location	Notes
86	Win	55–27–4	Art 'Young' Campbell	KO	4 (12)	Feb 25, 1939	Greater Newcastle Stadium, Newcastle, Australia	
85	Loss	54–27–4	Gus Lesnevich	PTS	12	Feb 2, 1939	Sydney Sports Arena, Sydney, Australia	
84	Loss	54–26–4	Al McCoy	PTS	10	Nov 8, 1938	Forum, Montreal, Quebec, Canada	
83	Loss	54–25–4	Buddy Knox	MD	10	Sep 1, 1938	Forum, Montreal, Quebec, Canada	
82	Loss	54–24–4	Steve Dudas	SD	10	Jan 24, 1938	Arena, Philadelphia, Pennsylvania, US	
81	Win	54–23–4	Tiger Hairston	TKO	2 (10)	Jan 8, 1938	Rockland Palace, New York City, New York, US	
80	Loss	53–23–4	Johnny Risko	UD	10	Nov 17, 1937	Public Hall, Cleveland, Ohio, US	
79	Loss	53–22–4	Leroy Haynes	TKO	6 (10)	Sep 28, 1937	Convention Hall, Philadelphia, Pennsylvania, US	
78	Win	53–21–4	Patsy Perroni	RTD	3 (10)	Sep 13, 1937	Convention Hall, Toledo, Ohio, US	
77	Loss	52–21–4	John Henry Lewis	TKO	8 (15), 1:20	Jun 3, 1937	Arena, Saint Louis, Missouri, US	For NYSAC, NBA, and The Ring light heavyweight titles
76	Win	52–20–4	Leonard Bostick	KO	1 (8)	May 4, 1937	Municipal Auditorium, Saint Louis, Missouri, US	
75	Win	51–20–4	Gunnar Bärlund	PTS	10	Mar 10, 1937	Hippodrome, New York City, New York, US	
74	Loss	50–20–4	Tiger Jack Fox	TKO	2 (10)	Jan 15, 1937	Armory, Spokane, Washington, US	
73	Win	50–19–4	Buck Everett	TKO	4 (10), 0:15	Nov 2, 1936	Turner's Arena, Washington, DC, US	
72	Loss	49–19–4	Red Bruce	MD	10	Aug 17, 1936	Hickey Park, Millvale, Pennsylvania, US	
71	Win	49–18–4	Jimmy DeSola	PTS	8	Aug 4, 1936	Coney Island Velodrome, New York City, New York, US	
70	Loss	48–18–4	Tommy Farr	PTS	10	Apr 2, 1936	Royal Albert Hall, London, England, UK	
69	Loss	48–17–4	Al McCoy	PTS	10	Dec 10, 1935	Forum, Montreal, Quebec, Canada	
68	Loss	48–16–4	John Henry Lewis	UD	15	Oct 31, 1935	Arena, Saint Louis, Missouri, US	Lost NYSAC, NBA, and The Ring light heavyweight titles
67	Win	48–15–4	Henry Firpo	KO	3 (10)	Sep 20, 1935	Convention Hall, Asbury Park, New Jersey, US	
66	Loss	47–15–4	John Henry Lewis	PTS	10	Apr 12, 1935	Dreamland Auditorium, San Francisco, California, US	
65	Win	47–14–4	Mickey Dugan	PTS	8	Mar 25, 1935	Public Hall, Cleveland, Ohio, US	
64	Loss	46–14–4	Dutch Weimer	PTS	10	Feb 26, 1935	Olympia Stadium, Detroit, Michigan, US	
63	Win	46–13–4	Fanis Tzanetopoulos	UD	10	Jan 11, 1935	Boston Garden, Boston, Massachusetts, US	
62	Win	45–13–4	Maxie Rosenbloom	SD	15	Nov 16, 1934	Madison Square Garden, New York City, New York, US	Won NYSAC, NBA, and The Ring light heavyweight titles
61	Draw	44–13–4	Abe Feldman	PTS	10	Jul 20, 1934	Legion Stadium, Hollywood, California, US	
60	Win	44–13–3	Bob Godwin	PTS	10	Jun 22, 1934	Legion Stadium, Hollywood, California, US	
59	Win	43–13–3	Bob Godwin	TKO	1 (10), 0:50	May 25, 1934	Legion Stadium, Hollywood, California, US	
58	Loss	42–13–3	Lou Brouillard	PTS	10	Apr 5, 1934	Arena, New Haven, Connecticut, US	
57	Loss	42–12–3	Lou Brouillard	SD	10	Jan 19, 1934	Madison Square Garden, New York City, New York, US	
56	Win	42–11–3	Al Gainer	PTS	10	Dec 22, 1933	Phoenix Arena, Waterbury, Connecticut, US	
55	Win	41–11–3	Charley Massera	PTS	8	Nov 17, 1933	Madison Square Garden, New York City, New York, US	
54	Win	40–11–3	Unknown Winston	PTS	6	Oct 9, 1933	Madison Square Garden, New York City, New York, US	
53	Draw	39–11–3	Al Gainer	PTS	6	Aug 17, 1933	Madison Square Garden, New York City, New York, US	
52	Win	39–11–2	Sam Portney	PTS	10	Jul 26, 1933	Fugazy Bowl, New York City, New York, US	
51	Draw	38–11–2	Charley Massera	PTS	10	Jul 5, 1933	Fugazy Bowl, New York City, New York, US	
50	Loss	38–11–1	Tony Shucco	PTS	10	Jun 19, 1933	Bonacker's Stadium, Rensselaer, New York, US	
49	Loss	38–10–1	Charley Massera	PTS	5	Mar 10, 1933	Madison Square Garden, New York City, New York, US	
48	Win	38–9–1	Paul Marques	PTS	5	Jan 20, 1933	Madison Square Garden, New York City, New York, US	
47	Loss	37–9–1	Martin Levandowski	TKO	5 (10)	Dec 29, 1932	Chicago Stadium, Chicago, Illinois, US	
46	Win	37–8–1	Tommy Walsh	PTS	6	Nov 18, 1932	Madison Square Garden, New York City, New York, US	
45	Loss	36–8–1	Al Gainer	PTS	10	Sep 1, 1932	White City Stadium, West Haven, Connecticut, US	
44	Win	36–7–1	Muggs Kerr	PTS	8	Jul 20, 1932	Ebbets Field, New York City, New York, US	
43	Win	35–7–1	Dick Fullam	PTS	8	Jun 1, 1932	Queensboro Stadium, New York City, New York, US	
42	Loss	34–7–1	Arthur Huttick	UD	10	Feb 15, 1932	St. Nicholas Arena, New York City, New York, US	
41	Loss	34–6–1	Baxter Calmes	PTS	10	Jan 15, 1932	Chicago Stadium, Chicago, Illinois, US	
40	Win	34–5–1	Clyde Chastain	SD	10	Dec 30, 1931	Chicago Stadium, Chicago, Illinois, US	
39	Win	33–5–1	Tait Littman	KO	4 (8)	Dec 18, 1931	Chicago Stadium, Chicago, Illinois, US	
38	Win	32–5–1	Don Petrin	TKO	6 (10)	Nov 23, 1931	New York Coliseum, New York City, New York, US	
37	Win	31–5–1	Willie Bush	PTS	10	Oct 23, 1931	Lakewood Arena, Waterbury, Connecticut, US	
36	Loss	30–5–1	Al Gainer	PTS	10	Sep 1, 1931	White City Stadium, West Haven, Connecticut, US	
35	Loss	30–4–1	Willie Bush	PTS	10	Aug 14, 1931	White City Stadium, West Haven, Connecticut, US	
34	Win	30–3–1	Al Gainer	PTS	10	Jul 27, 1931	White City Stadium, West Haven, Connecticut, US	
33	Win	29–3–1	Willard Dix	KO	1 (10)	Jun 22, 1931	Dexter Park Arena, New York City, New York, US	
32	Win	28–3–1	Tony Ferrante	TKO	5 (10), 2:30	Jun 8, 1931	Dexter Park Arena, New York City, New York, US	
31	Loss	27–3–1	Joe Banovic	PTS	10	Mar 30, 1931	Madison Square Garden, New York City, New York, US	
30	Win	27–2–1	Tony Ferrante	UD	10	Feb 24, 1931	Broadway Arena, New York City, New York, US	
29	Win	26–2–1	Joe Banovic	PTS	10	Dec 19, 1930	Madison Square Garden, New York City, New York, US	
28	Win	25–2–1	Willard Dix	PTS	10	Oct 22, 1930	Madison Square Garden, New York City, New York, US	
27	Win	24–2–1	Eddie Huelsebus	PTS	6	Sep 20, 1930	Ridgewood Grove, New York City, New York, US	
26	Win	23–2–1	Tommy Walsh	TKO	3 (8)	Sep 9, 1930	Queensboro Stadium, New York City, New York, US	
25	Loss	22–2–1	Joe Sekyra	PTS	10	Jun 30, 1930	Dexter Park Arena, New York City, New York, US	
24	Win	22–1–1	Ralph Ficucello	PTS	8	Jun 3, 1930	Queensboro Stadium, New York City, New York, US	
23	Win	21–1–1	Roy Wallace	DQ	8 (10), 2:35	Apr 30, 1930	Madison Square Garden, New York City, New York, US	Wallace DQ'd for a low punch
22	Win	20–1–1	George LaRocco	PTS	6	Apr 9, 1930	New Lenox SC, New York City, New York, US	
21	Win	19–1–1	Italian Jack Herman	PTS	6	Mar 11, 1930	New Lenox SC, New York City, New York, US	
20	Win	18–1–1	Leo Williams	PTS	10	Feb 24, 1930	St. Nicholas Arena, New York City, New York, US	
19	Loss	17–1–1	Joe Banovic	PTS	10	Dec 2, 1929	St. Nicholas Arena, New York City, New York, US	
18	Win	17–0–1	George LaRocco	PTS	10	Nov 7, 1929	St. Nicholas Arena, New York City, New York, US	
17	Win	16–0–1	Amedeo Grillo	KO	3 (8)	Sep 30, 1929	St. Nicholas Arena, New York City, New York, US	
16	Win	15–0–1	Bruno Sala	PTS	8	Sep 18, 1929	Queensboro Stadium, New York City, New York, US	
15	Win	14–0–1	Felix Milano	KO	1 (6)	Aug 12, 1929	Dexter Park Arena, New York City, New York, US	
14	Win	13–0–1	Dave King	UD	8	Jul 23, 1929	Queensboro Stadium, New York City, New York, US	
13	Win	12–0–1	Jimmy Morris	TKO	3 (8), 0:53	Jul 16, 1929	Queensboro Stadium, New York City, New York, US	
12	Win	11–0–1	Eric Holmberg	KO	5 (6)	Jun 17, 1929	Dexter Park Arena, New York City, New York, US	
11	Win	10–0–1	Joe Johnson	KO	1 (6)	Jun 3, 1929	Dexter Park Arena, New York City, New York, US	
10	Win	9–0–1	Herman Riegel	TKO	4 (6), 0:35	May 13, 1929	St. Nicholas Arena, New York City, New York, US	
9	Win	8–0–1	Jim Finklea	KO	1 (?)	Apr 27, 1929	Olympia Boxing Club, New York City, New York, US	
8	Win	7–0–1	Jimmy Griffin	KO	1 (8)	Apr 13, 1929	Olympia Boxing Club, New York City, New York, US	
7	Win	6–0–1	Larry Hogan	TKO	1 (6)	Mar 25, 1929	Broadway Arena, New York City, New York, US	
6	Win	5–0–1	Jimmy Roberts	PTS	6	Mar 19, 1929	Uptown Lenox SC, New York City, New York, US	
5	Draw	4–0–1	Frank Morris	PTS	6	Jan 19, 1929	Ridgewood Grove, New York City, New York, US	
4	Win	4–0	Al Braddock	KO	2 (4)	Dec 28, 1928	Madison Square Garden, New York City, New York, US	
3	Win	3–0	Jack Marsling	KO	1 (4)	Nov 5, 1928	Broadway Arena, New York City, New York, US	
2	Win	2–0	Billy Lancaster	TKO	1 (6)	Oct 24, 1928	Manhattan Casino, New York City, New York, US	
1	Win	1–0	Olaf Herset	KO	1 (4)	Oct 8, 1928	Broadway Arena, New York City, New York, US	

== Titles in boxing ==
=== Major world titles ===
- NYSAC light heavyweight champion (175 lbs)
- NBA (WBA) light heavyweight champion (175 lbs)

=== The Ring magazine titles ===
- The Ring light heavyweight champion (175 lbs)

=== Undisputed titles ===
- Undisputed light heavyweight champion

== See also ==
- List of light heavyweight boxing champions
- List of select Jewish boxers

Achievements
Preceded by Maxie Rosenbloom	NYSAC light heavyweight champion November 16, 1934 – October 31, 1935	Succeeded by John Henry Lewis
Preceded by Maxie Rosenbloom	The Ring light heavyweight champion November 16, 1934 – October 31, 1935	Succeeded by John Henry Lewis
