= Joe Knight (boxer) =

American boxer

Personal information
- Nickname: The Cairo Calamity
- Nationality: American
- Born: Joseph Washington Knight; January 15, 1909 Cairo, Georgia
- Died: July 16, 1976 (aged 67) Dekalb, Georgia
- Height: 5 ft 11 1/2 in (182 cm)
- Weight: Light Heavyweight

Boxing career
- Reach: 73 1/2 in (187 cm)
- Stance: Southpaw

Boxing record
- Total fights: 164
- Wins: 125
- Win by KO: 66
- Losses: 19
- Draws: 18
- No contests: 2

Joe Knight (January 15, 1909 – July 1, 1976) was an American light-heavyweight boxer and former NBA world champion in the division. Knight had a very brief reign as world light-heavyweight champion that lasted just a few days, and without ever winning a world-title bout: the NBA had awarded Knight the title by February 26, 1933, and he lost the title in his first defense on March 1, 1933, to Bob Godwin. An extraordinarily formidable fighter for his day, Knight fought 164 bouts and was never stopped in any of his 19 losses.

== Early life ==
Knight was born on January 15, 1909, in Cairo, Georgia. He turned pro in 1927 and knocked out "Battleship Sword" in the fall of that year, slowly building his reputation as a boxer.

=== Early career ===
On May 22, 1931, New York native Yale Okun became his fifth-round knockout victim in Miami. The final blow was a straight right to the jaw. Knight battered Okun with his left for four rounds before ending the bout in the fifth.

Knight gained revenge against Spike Webb in ten rounds in Miami on August 7, though knocked to the mat in the fourth. He had lost to Webb the previous month, taking a knockdown in the first.

Knight won an unpopular decision over Tony Cancela on January 7, 1932, in Miami. Cancela drilled staggering rights to the head of a groggy Knight in the closing round. Many ringside believed Cancela, the bout's consistent aggressor, should have earned the decision with a comfortable margin.

Don Petrin, who claimed a late foul, fell to Knight in a fourth-round knockout at Miami's Biscayne Arena on February 15, 1932. The bout had originally been scheduled for ten rounds.

Charley Belanger lost to Knight on May 23, 1932, in a ten-round split decision in Boston. Knight had a considerable lead in the first four rounds, but experienced an assortment of blows to the body in the remaining six. He closed strong in the final rounds scoring several times with lefts to the head. The decision was unpopular with the crowd who felt Belanger had gained a winning margin on points in the last six rounds.

On the first of July, 1932, Knight challenged Bob Godwin for the Southern light-heavyweight title at Daytona Beach, and received a ten-round draw decision. Godwin had formerly taken the title from Knight. Knight initially led, but slowed in the last two rounds before Godwin's relentless attack. The crowd appeared satisfied with the draw decision in the savage bout.

Knight faced George Courtney on September 19, 1932, winning at the end of the fifth from a technical knockout in Laurel, Maryland.

He decisively defeated reigning National Boxing Association (NBA) light-heavyweight champion George Nichols in a non-title bout before 3,000 people in Charleston, South Carolina on October 17, 1932, by a ten-round decision. Knight charged into his opponent from the opening bell, and Nichols failed to take a round.

Chick Raines fell to Knight in a ten-round points decision on November 23, 1932, in Savannah.

Natie Brown lost in a fifth-round technical knockout to Knight on November 29, 1932, in Jacksonville, Florida. Brown was reported to have suffered a broken jaw and was unable to continue.

Knight defeated Owen Phelps on December 6, 1932, in a ten-round bout for the Southern Light Heavyweight Title in Alexandria, Virginia. Knight was given every round, and knocked Phelps to the mat for a no count in the fourth. Phelps was required to clinch, hold, and back away to endure Knight's attack.

Battling Bozo lost on February 13, 1933, in a ten-round points decision at Daytona Beach. Knight may have taken every round, but his opponent avoided a knockout with an effective defense.

=== Awarded the NBA Light-heavyweight Title ===
By late February 1933, George Nichols had been stripped of his title by the NBA due to a lack of title defenses. Following a sixth-round stoppage over Eddie McCarthy on the 20th of February, the NBA had awarded Knight the vacant light-heavyweight title by the 26th.

=== Losing the Title to Bob Godwin ===
His championship reign would be short-lived, as Knight immediately lost the title on March 1, dropping a ten-round decision to his old rival Bob Godwin. The two faced each other on March 1, 1933, in West Palm Beach, Florida. Throughout the fight, Godwin employed excellent blocking, and though he took many hard licks in the lengthy bout, he was the aggressor for the majority of the fight and dominated Knight in the infighting, particularly after Knight tired by mid-bout. Godwin took two of the first five rounds, with three even. Drawing on remarkable stamina, the 21-year old Godwin won the next four rounds, leaving the tenth even. Nevertheless, Godwin took a beating in the bout, with both eyes badly swollen by the end. It was reported as a primitive match requiring limited boxing skill or ring generalship. Knight won only two of the five meetings between him and Godwin. Thus ended Knight's brief reign as champion.

Max Marek, the tenth ranked heavyweight in the world, fell to Knight in a ten-round points decision at Miami Beach on April 13, 1936. Though giving up fifteen pounds, Knight used his speed and experience to his advantage. The bout one of Knight's best displays of skill. In the third, he nearly staggered Marek with a left to the chin, but Marek fought back harder, and remained the aggressor throughout much of the bout, delivering a variety of solid punches. In a brutal bout, Knight closed well in the last three rounds, clipping two lefts to the chin of Marek in the tenth.

Knight beat Lou Scozza at the Biscayne Arena in Miami on June 12, 1933, in a ten-round points decision. Knight shelled Scozza with hard lefts and right for most of ten rounds. Though Scozza rallied in the ninth, he was unable to overcome the lead that Knight had piled up. Four thousand spectators watched the judges rule unanimously for Knight.

Joe Banovic lost to Knight in a ten-round points decision on August 8, 1933, in Laurel, Maryland. Banovic was down for a count of nine in the fifth, and eight in the sixth. He opened up in the final round, cutting Knight's face, but it was too late to take the lead in points.

=== Final attempt at the world title ===
On February 5, 1934, Knight fought a fifteen-round draw before 20,000 in another world light-heavyweight title match against undisputed champion Maxie Rosenbloom. By that point, Rosenbloom was recognized by the NBA, the NYSAC, and The Ring. The referee and one judge scored the match as a dead heat, giving three rounds to both contestants, but Sam Roberts, the remaining judge gave the bout to Knight by the slimmest margin of one round. Rosenbloom employed his common but controversial habit of flicking and backhanding his opponent's face and body with an open glove. Whether this was a foul or fair determined whether the judges scored Knight or Rosenbloom the winner. Most ringside, however, felt Knight deserved the winning vote and the title.

=== Later career ===
Knight lost to Tony Shucco, New England Light Heavyweight Champion, on May 11, 1934, before 3,358, in a close ten-round unanimous decision at Boston Garden. Knight appeared to have the better of the early bout, but Shucco rallied in the closing rounds. Through much of the bout, Shucco stood off at long range and flicked jabs at Knight's head to avoid his withering blows. One reporter gave Shucco only five rounds, Knight four, and one even.

Knight defeated Carl Knowles on June 8, 1934, in a tenth-round technical knockout in a brutal bout in Savannah. Knight used repeated left hooks with great effect, and waged a masterful defense, either blocking or ducking Knowles's best blows. Knowles mounted an offensive only in the early rounds.

Buck Everett fell to Knight in a ninth-round technical knockout in Miami on June 11, 1934. The referee stopped the hard fought battle to prevent further injury to Everett's badly cut left eye, and broken rib. Everett scored hard rights in the early rounds, and the final rounds featured fierce in-fighting with the boxers only inches apart. Bob Riley, Everett's manager, was informed in confidence by a Doctor the rib was likely broken after the fourth round, but the bout continued until Riley demanded it end.

Knight achieved a seventh-round technical knockout of Henry Firpo on June 28, 1934, in Washington. Firpo was down for a count of nine in the fourth, though he rallied in the fifth. The bout was stopped in the seventh when Knight had Firpo down twice.

Knight knocked out Clyde Chastain in six rounds on July 23, 1934, in Miami. Knight shot a stiff left to the midsection, followed by a hard right that left Chastain on the floor at the fifth round bell. Charging out at the opening of the sixth, Knight tagged Chastain with a left to the stomach for a count of nine. When Chastain arose, Knight instantly sent him to the mat for the final time.

In the fall of 1934, the National Boxing Association vacated Maxie Rosenbloom's light heavyweight title. The commissions for North Carolina, Georgia, and Florida named Joe Knight as World Champion, and North Carolina requested the NBA that the winner of his scheduled January 1935 rematch with Tony Shucco be officially crowned as champion. Nevertheless, their recognition held little weight, and the NBA instead crowned Bob Olin as champion after he defeated Rosenbloom in November 1934. He was featured on the cover of the September 1934 Ring Magazine.

==== Career decline and loss to Al Gainer ====
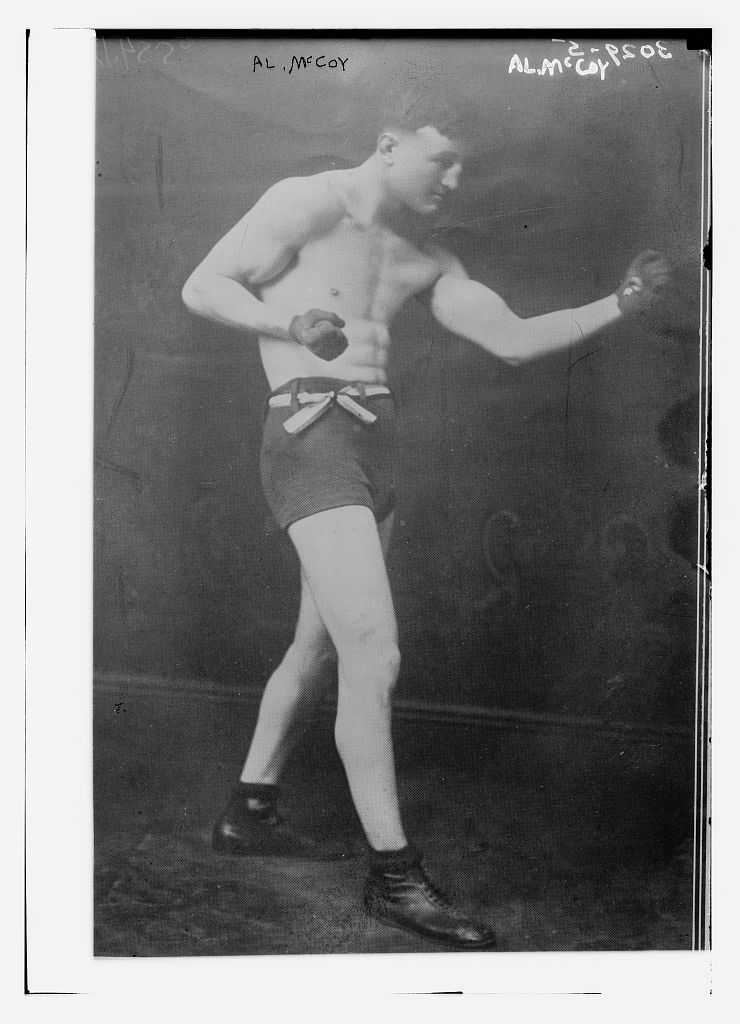
Al McCoy

Winning a decisive seventh round technical knockout over Al Rodrigues on October 15, 1934, Knight showcased his powerful left. Both contestants fought cautiously in the first four rounds. In the fifth, Knight landed a heavy left to Rodrigues's stomach, then immediately dropped him for a count of nine with another to the jaw, bringing an end to the fifth. Rodrigues was down again in the sixth for a nine count. Dazed and beaten in the seventh, Rodrigues' seconds threw in the towel to end the bout. He later had his rematch with Tony Shucco on January 28, 1935, which ended in a ten-round PTS draw.

Corn Griffin fell to Knight in a fourth round technical knockout on July 4, 1935. Both contestants continued to battle after the fourth round bell, and the referee immediately stopped the bout, concerning about bleeding from Griffin's eyes. Still concerned, the referee prevented Griffin from answering the fifth round bell.

Knight dropped a match to Southpaw and former middleweight champion Al McCoy in Montreal, Canada on September 5, 1935. The bout was for the Montreal Athletic Commission World Light Heavyweight Title, with McCoy winning in a fifteen round Unanimous Decision at Mount Royal Arena. McCoy took eight rounds, Knight three, and the rest were even.

Knight had a devastating loss to the gifted Al Gainer on June 1, 1936, in a ten-round points decision in Millvale, Pennsylvania. Gainer, who took every round, gave Knight a decisive beating. Gainer sent Knight to one knee in the third, and staggered him on several occasions. Beaten and exhausted, Knight remained strictly on defense after the fifth round. Though he would fight on for two more years, he tried to officially retire shortly after the bout.

Fellow Southpaw Melio Bettina won a decisive ten-round decision over Knight at Miami Beach on June 18, 1937. One reporter noted that Knight had won only three rounds and should consider retirement. Down for a no count in the sixth, Knight lost decisively on points in the last three rounds. Never a second-rate boxer, Bettina would contend twice for the NBA World Light Heavyweight championship two years later. Knight would take six months off, and he would then take four more wins before retiring in 1938. In his final bout on April 19, 1938, Knight defeated Chet Gideon in a ten-round points decision in Orlando. Knight had Gideon down once in the ninth and once in the tenth.

== Life after boxing ==
In retirement, Knight promoted fights in Georgia and Florida. He died on July 16, 1976, in Dekalb, Georgia.

== Professional boxing record ==
All information in this section is derived from BoxRec, unless otherwise stated.

=== Official record ===
164 fights	124 wins	19 losses
By knockout	66	0
By decision	58	19
Draws	18	
No contests	2	
Newspaper decisions/draws	1	

All newspaper decisions are officially regarded as “no decision” bouts and are not counted in the win/loss/draw column.

No.	Result	Record	Opponent	Type	Round, time	Date	Location	Notes
164	Win	124–19–18 (3)	Chet Gideon	PTS	10	Apr 19, 1938	American Legion Arena, Orlando, Florida, US	
163	Win	123–19–18 (3)	Pat McDuff	PTS	10	Apr 8, 1938	Legion Arena, West Palm Beach, Florida, US	
162	Win	122–19–18 (3)	Eddie Boyle	PTS	10	Mar 24, 1938	Beach Arena, Miami Beach, Florida, US	
161	Win	121–19–18 (3)	Harold Anderson	PTS	10	Mar 3, 1938	Beach Arena, Miami Beach, Florida, US	
160	Loss	120–19–18 (3)	Melio Bettina	PTS	10	Jun 18, 1937	Beach Arena, Miami Beach, Florida, US	
159	NC	120–18–18 (3)	Patsy Perroni	NC	7 (10)	Mar 31, 1937	Naval Armory, Detroit, Michigan, US	
158	Loss	120–18–18 (2)	Texas Joe Dundee	PTS	10	Oct 12, 1936	Lakeland, Florida, US	
157	Loss	120–17–18 (2)	Al Gainer	PTS	10	Jun 1, 1936	Hickey Park, Millvale, Pennsylvania, US	
156	Win	120–16–18 (2)	Max Marek	PTS	10	Apr 13, 1936	Beach Arena, Miami Beach, Florida, US	
155	Loss	119–16–18 (2)	Bob Godwin	UD	10	Apr 7, 1936	Legion Arena, West Palm Beach, Florida, US	
154	Win	119–15–18 (2)	Dewey Kimrey	PTS	10	Mar 19, 1936	Miami Stadium, Miami, Florida, US	
153	Win	118–15–18 (2)	Buck Everett	SD	12	Feb 3, 1936	Beach Arena, Miami Beach, Florida, US	
152	Draw	117–15–18 (2)	Patsy Perroni	PTS	10	Jan 17, 1936	Coliseum, Coral Gables, Florida, US	
151	Win	117–15–17 (2)	Wilson Dunn	PTS	10	Nov 28, 1935	Daytona Beach, Florida, US	
150	Win	116–15–17 (2)	George Blackburn	TKO	3 (10)	Nov 25, 1935	Beach Arena, Miami Beach, Florida, US	
149	Win	115–15–17 (2)	Buck Everett	PTS	10	Nov 14, 1935	Cinderella Ballroom, Miami, Florida, US	
148	Win	114–15–17 (2)	Carl Knowles	PTS	10	Oct 25, 1935	Savannah, Georgia, US	
147	Win	113–15–17 (2)	Salvatore Ruggirello	TKO	6 (10)	Sep 30, 1935	Beach Arena, Miami Beach, Florida, US	
146	Win	112–15–17 (2)	Pepon Gonzales	KO	8 (10)	Sep 22, 1935	Havana, Cuba	
145	Loss	111–15–17 (2)	Al McCoy	UD	15	Sep 5, 1935	Mount Royal Arena, Montreal, Quebec, Canada	For vacant world light heavyweight title (Montreal version)
144	Draw	111–14–17 (2)	Buck Everett	PTS	10	Aug 5, 1935	Beach Arena, Miami Beach, Florida, US	
143	Win	111–14–16 (2)	Benny O'Dell	KO	5 (10)	Jul 29, 1935	Infantry School Arena, Fort Benning, Georgia, US	
142	Win	110–14–16 (2)	Don 'Red' Barry	PTS	10	Jul 25, 1935	Savannah, Georgia, US	
141	Win	109–14–16 (2)	Dutch Weimer	PTS	10	Jul 23, 1935	Beach Arena, Miami Beach, Florida, US	
140	Win	108–14–16 (2)	Corn Griffin	RTD	4 (10)	Jul 4, 1935	Jacksonville Beach, Florida, US	
139	Win	107–14–16 (2)	Mickey Dugan	KO	5 (10)	Jul 1, 1935	Beach Arena, Miami Beach, Georgia, US	
138	Win	106–14–16 (2)	Charlie Baisden	PTS	10	Jun 27, 1935	Moultrie, Georgia, US	
137	Win	105–14–16 (2)	Tom Terry	KO	2 (10)	Jun 13, 1935	Hahira, Georgia, US	
136	Win	104–14–16 (2)	Paul Marques	PTS	10	Feb 19, 1935	Legion Arena, West Palm Beach, Florida, US	
135	Loss	103–14–16 (2)	Tony Shucco	MD	10	Feb 11, 1935	Cinderella Ballroom, Miami, Florida, US	
134	Draw	103–13–16 (2)	Tony Shucco	PTS	10	Jan 28, 1935	Municipal Stadium, Miami, Florida, US	
133	Win	103–13–15 (2)	Eddie Karolak	KO	2 (10)	Jan 10, 1935	Beach Arena, Miami Beach, Florida, US	
132	Win	102–13–15 (2)	Wilson Dunn	KO	3 (10)	Oct 22, 1934	City Auditorium, Galveston, Texas, US	
131	Win	101–13–15 (2)	Al Rodrigues	TKO	7 (12)	Oct 15, 1934	Coliseum, Coral Gables, Florida, US	
130	Win	100–13–15 (2)	Earl Johnson	TKO	7 (?)	Oct 2, 1934	Athens, Georgia, US	
129	Win	99–13–15 (2)	Rosy Rosales	PTS	10	Sep 28, 1934	Carolina Arena, Asheville, North Carolina, US	
128	Win	98–13–15 (2)	George Pavlick	PTS	10	Aug 2, 1934	Savannah, Georgia, US	
127	Win	97–13–15 (2)	Clyde Chastain	KO	6 (10)	Jul 23, 1934	Cinderella Ballroom, Miami, Florida, US	
126	Win	96–13–15 (2)	Leroy Brown	UD	10	Jul 16, 1934	Sullivan's Bowl, Charleston, South Carolina, US	Retained Southern light heavyweight title
125	Win	95–13–15 (2)	Rosy Rosales	PTS	10	Jul 6, 1934	Atlanta, Georgia, US	
124	Win	94–13–15 (2)	Henry Firpo	TKO	7 (10)	Jun 27, 1934	American Legion Arena, Washington, DC, US	
123	Win	93–13–15 (2)	Buck Everett	TKO	9 (10)	Jun 11, 1934	Cinderella Ballroom, Miami, Florida, US	
122	Win	92–13–15 (2)	Carl Knowles	TKO	10 (10)	Jun 8, 1934	Municipal Auditorium, Savannah, Georgia, US	
121	Win	91–13–15 (2)	Tony Cancela	UD	10	May 28, 1934	Cinderella Ballroom, Miami, Florida, US	
120	Loss	90–13–15 (2)	Tony Shucco	UD	10	May 11, 1934	Boston Garden, Boston, Massachusetts, US	
119	Win	90–12–15 (2)	Tex Leavelle	KO	4 (8)	Apr 17, 1934	Roanoke, Virginia, US	
118	Draw	89–12–15 (2)	Buck Everett	PTS	10	Apr 5, 1934	Coliseum, Coral Gables, Florida, US	
117	Win	89–12–14 (2)	Eddie Houghton	PTS	10	Mar 20, 1934	Legion Arena, West Palm Beach, Florida, US	
116	Win	88–12–14 (2)	Les Kennedy	KO	2 (10)	Mar 16, 1934	Cinderella Ballroom, Miami, Florida, US	
115	Draw	87–12–14 (2)	Maxie Rosenbloom	PTS	15	Feb 5, 1934	Madison Square Garden Stadium, Miami, Florida, US	For NYSAC, NBA, and The Ring light heavyweight titles
114	NC	87–12–13 (2)	Eddie McCarthy	NC	1 (10)	Nov 11, 1933	Municipal Stadium, Orlando, Florida, US	
113	Win	87–12–13 (1)	George Nichols	PTS	8	Nov 3, 1933	Madison Square Garden, New York City, New York, US	
112	Win	86–12–13 (1)	Bob Godwin	TKO	5 (10)	Oct 16, 1933	Biscayne Arena, Miami, Florida, US	
111	Win	85–12–13 (1)	Frankie Wine	PTS	10	Sep 22, 1933	Rome, Georgia, US	
110	Loss	84–12–13 (1)	Bob Godwin	SD	10	Aug 30, 1933	Twin City Arena, Laurel, Maryland, US	
109	Win	84–11–13 (1)	Joe Banovic	PTS	10	Aug 8, 1933	Twin City Arena, Laurel, Maryland, US	
108	Win	83–11–13 (1)	Battling Bozo	NWS	10	Jun 28, 1933	City Auditorium, Birmingham, Alabama, US	
107	Win	83–11–13	Lou Scozza	PTS	10	Jun 12, 1933	Biscayne Arena, Miami, Florida, US	
106	Win	82–11–13	Tiger Lemons	TKO	9 (?)	May 15, 1933	Sullivan's Bowl, Charleston, Georgia, US	
105	Win	81–11–13	Battling Bozo	UD	10	Apr 17, 1933	Municipal Auditorium, Macon, Georgia, US	
104	Win	80–11–13	Wild Bill Cox	PTS	10	Apr 3, 1933	City Auditorium, Macon, Georgia, US	
103	Win	79–11–13	Eric Lawson	PTS	10	Mar 14, 1933	Legion Arena, West Palm Beach, Florida, US	
102	Win	78–11–13	Tex Wallace	PTS	10	Mar 9, 1933	Waycross, Georgia, US	
101	Loss	77–11–13	Bob Godwin	PTS	10	Mar 1, 1933	Legion Arena, West Palm Beach, Florida, US	Lost NBA light heavyweight title
100	Win	77–10–13	Eddie McCarthy	RTD	6 (10)	Feb 20, 1933	Lakeland, Florida, US	
99	Win	76–10–13	Irving Ashkenazy	TKO	3 (10)	Feb 15, 1933	Leesburg, Florida, US	
98	Win	75–10–13	Battling Bozo	PTS	10	Feb 13, 1933	Daytona Beach, Florida, US	
97	Win	74–10–13	Romeo LeMon	PTS	10	Jan 13, 1933	Daytona Beach, Florida, US	
96	Win	73–10–13	Russ Rowsey	MD	10	Dec 29, 1932	Coliseum, Orlando, Florida, US	
95	Win	72–10–13	Owen Phelps	PTS	10	Dec 6, 1932	Portner's Arena, Alexandria, Virginia, US	Retained Southern light heavyweight title
94	Win	71–10–13	Charley Arthurs	TKO	6 (10)	Dec 2, 1932	Daytona Beach, Florida, US	
93	Win	70–10–13	Natie Brown	TKO	5 (10)	Nov 29, 1932	Jacksonville, Florida, US	
92	Win	69–10–13	Chick Raines	PTS	10	Nov 23, 1932	Savannah, Georgia, US	
91	Win	68–10–13	Cracker Smith	TKO	2 (10), 3:00	Nov 11, 1932	American Legion Arena, Tallahassee, Florida, US	
90	Win	67–10–13	Pietro Corri	PTS	10	Nov 9, 1932	Daytona Beach, Florida, US	
89	Win	66–10–13	George Nichols	UD	10	Oct 17, 1932	Sullivan's Bowl, Charleston, South Carolina, US	
88	Win	65–10–13	George Courtney	KO	5 (10)	Sep 19, 1932	Twin City Arena, Laurel, Maryland, US	
87	Win	64–10–13	Bob Tow	KO	4 (10)	Sep 7, 1932	Twin City Arena, Laurel, Maryland, US	
86	Win	63–10–13	Eric Lawson	KO	4 (10)	Aug 16, 1932	Biscayne Arena, Miami, Florida, US	
85	Win	62–10–13	Terry Roberts	TKO	1 (10)	Aug 5, 1932	Cinderella Ballroom, Miami, Florida, US	
84	Win	61–10–13	Bob Godwin	PTS	10	Jul 1, 1932	Daytona Beach, Florida, US	Won Southern light heavyweight title
83	Win	60–10–13	Eric Lawson	KO	9 (?)	Jun 20, 1932	Roanoke, Virginia, US	
82	Win	59–10–13	Willie Oster	PTS	10	Jun 6, 1932	Arena, Boston, Massachusetts, US	
81	Win	58–10–13	Charley Belanger	SD	10	May 23, 1932	Arena, Boston, Massachusetts, US	
80	Win	57–10–13	Maxie Rosenbloom	PTS	10	Mar 18, 1932	Daytona Beach, Florida, US	
79	Win	56–10–13	Don Petrin	KO	5 (10)	Feb 15, 1932	Biscayne Arena, Miami, Florida, US	
78	Loss	55–10–13	Bob Godwin	MD	10	Jan 20, 1932	Madison Square Garden Stadium, Miami, Florida, US	Lost Southern light heavyweight title
77	Win	55–9–13	Tony Cancela	PTS	10	Jan 7, 1932	Cinderella Ballroom, Miami, Florida, US	
76	Win	54–9–13	Joe Finazzo	KO	4 (10)	Dec 18, 1931	Legion Arena, Lake Worth, Florida, US	
75	Win	53–9–13	Don 'Red' Barry	PTS	10	Dec 3, 1931	Cinderella Ballroom, Miami, Florida, US	
74	Draw	52–9–13	Cyclone Smith	PTS	10	Nov 20, 1931	Savannah, Georgia, US	
73	Win	52–9–12	Jake Denning	PTS	10	Nov 10, 1931	Jacksonville, Florida, US	
72	Win	51–9–12	Jack Berry	KO	2 (10)	Oct 23, 1931	Johnson Hagood Stadium, Charleston, South Carolina, US	
71	Win	50–9–12	Leslie Beard	KO	1 (10)	Oct 9, 1931	Marianna, Florida, US	
70	Win	49–9–12	Monroe Porter	KO	1 (10)	Oct 5, 1931	Lakeland, Florida, US	
69	Win	48–9–12	Carl Knowles	TKO	8 (10), 1:00	Aug 20, 1931	Savannah, Georgia, US	
68	Win	47–9–12	Spike Webb	PTS	10	Aug 7, 1931	Cinderella Ballroom, Miami, Florida, US	
67	Win	46–9–12	Corn Griffin	PTS	10	Jul 7, 1931	Doughboy Stadium, Fort Benning, Georgia, US	
66	Loss	45–9–12	Spike Webb	PTS	10	Jul 3, 1931	Cinderella Ballroom, Miami, Florida, US	
65	Win	45–8–12	Bobby Evans	KO	5 (10)	Jun 12, 1931	Cinderella Ballroom, Miami, Florida, US	
64	Win	44–8–12	Yale Okun	KO	5 (12)	May 22, 1931	Cinderella Ballroom, Miami, Florida, US	
63	Win	43–8–12	Kid Bombero	KO	4 (10)	May 15, 1931	Waycross, Georgia, US	
62	Win	42–8–12	Bob Godwin	KO	8 (10)	Apr 30, 1931	Daytona Beach, Florida, US	Won Southern light heavyweight title
61	Win	41–8–12	Eric Lawson	PTS	15	Apr 16, 1931	Daytona Beach, Florida, US	
60	Loss	40–8–12	Bob Godwin	PTS	10	Apr 9, 1931	Daytona Beach, Florida, US	
59	Draw	40–7–12	Eric Lawson	PTS	10	Mar 6, 1931	American Legion Arena, Tallahassee, Florida, US	
58	Draw	40–7–11	Whitey Gorsline	PTS	6	Feb 25, 1931	Madison Square Garden Stadium, Miami, Florida, US	
57	Win	40–7–10	Phil Whitley	KO	3 (?)	Feb 19, 1931	Armory, Daytona Beach, Florida, US	
56	Win	39–7–10	Bill Thaler	PTS	10	Feb 3, 1931	Legion Armory, Saint Petersburg, Florida, US	
55	Win	38–7–10	Bobby Marriott	KO	2 (10)	Jan 26, 1931	Legion Arena, Lakeland, Florida, US	
54	Loss	37–7–10	Eric Lawson	PTS	8	Jan 2, 1931	Oasis, Portsmouth, Virginia, US	
53	Win	37–6–10	Jack O'Hara	KO	4 (10)	Dec 22, 1930	Elks Club, Quincy, Florida, US	
52	Win	36–6–10	Cyclone Smith	TKO	6 (?)	Nov 7, 1930	Savannah, Georgia, US	
51	Win	35–6–10	Russ Rowsey	KO	4 (?)	Nov 3, 1930	Roanoke, Virginia, US	
50	Draw	34–6–10	Kid Williams	PTS	10	Oct 10, 1930	Waycross, Georgia, US	
49	Win	34–6–9	Russ Rowsey	PTS	10	Sep 30, 1930	Roanoke, Virginia, US	Second fight in one day
48	Draw	33–6–9	Eric Lawson	PTS	10	Sep 30, 1930	Roanoke, Virginia, US	
47	Loss	33–6–8	Billy Schwartz	PTS	10	Sep 15, 1930	Roanoke, Virginia, US	
46	Draw	33–5–8	Bob Godwin	PTS	10	Aug 22, 1930	Waycross, Georgia, US	
45	Win	33–5–7	Bob Tow	PTS	10	Aug 5, 1930	City Gymnasium, Atlanta, Georgia, US	
44	Win	32–5–7	Willie Ptomey	KO	2 (?)	Jul 8, 1930	Knoxville, Tennessee, US	
43	Loss	31–5–7	Ernesto Sagues	PTS	10	May 30, 1930	Waycross A.C. Gymnasium, Waycross, Georgia, US	
42	Draw	31–4–7	Corn Griffin	PTS	8	May 13, 1930	Fort Benning Arena, Fort Benning, Georgia, US	
41	Win	31–4–6	Lockjaw Pike	KO	2 (?)	Apr 18, 1930	Sterchi Park Arena, Knoxville, Tennessee, US	
40	Win	30–4–6	Corn Griffin	PTS	8	Apr 17, 1930	Chattanooga, Tennessee, US	
39	Win	29–4–6	Lew Carpenter	KO	4 (10)	Mar 28, 1930	Jaycee Gymnasium, Waycross, Georgia, US	
38	Draw	28–4–6	Cyclone Smith	PTS	10	Mar 25, 1930	Fort Benning Arena, Fort Benning, Georgia, US	
37	Draw	28–4–5	Joe King	PTS	10	Mar 17, 1930	Quincy, Florida, US	
36	Win	28–4–4	Gus Papst	TKO	1 (10)	Mar 14, 1930	Jaycee Gymnasium, Waycross, Georgia, US	
35	Win	27–4–4	Cyclone Smith	PTS	10	Mar 7, 1930	Tobacco Warehouse, Cairo, Georgia, US	
34	Win	26–4–4	Chief Wilbur	PTS	10	Jan 24, 1930	Benjamin Field Arena, Tampa, Florida, US	
33	Loss	25–4–4	Raul Rojas	PTS	10	Jan 7, 1930	Waterfront Park, Saint Petersburg, Florida, US	
32	Win	25–3–4	Jackie Baker	PTS	10	Dec 23, 1929	Copeland Park Pavilion, Cairo, Georgia, US	
31	Win	24–3–4	Johnny Williams	KO	2 (10)	Nov 11, 1929	Centennial Field, Tallahassee, Florida, US	
30	Win	23–3–4	OK Thomas	KO	3 (10)	Sep 24, 1929	Tobacco Warehouse, Cairo, Georgia, US	
29	Win	22–3–4	Glenn Chancey	PTS	10	Sep 19, 1929	Centennial Field, Tallahassee, Florida, US	
28	Win	21–3–4	Brady O'Hara	PTS	10	Aug 27, 1929	Tobacco Warehouse, Cairo, Georgia, US	
27	Win	20–3–4	Spike Kelly	TKO	4 (10)	Aug 15, 1929	Centennial Field, Tallahassee, Florida, US	
26	Win	19–3–4	Kid Bombero	KO	5 (10)	Aug 13, 1929	Tobacco Warehouse, Cairo, Georgia, US	
25	Draw	18–3–4	Brady O'Hara	PTS	10	Jul 18, 1929	Centennial Field, Tallahassee, Florida, US	
24	Loss	18–3–3	Glenn Chancey	PTS	10	Jul 2, 1929	Jacksonville, Florida, US	
23	Loss	18–2–3	Brady O'Hara	PTS	10	Apr 30, 1929	Jacksonville, Florida, US	
22	Draw	18–1–3	Glenn Chancey	PTS	10	Apr 23, 1929	Waterfront Park, Saint Petersburg, Florida, US	
21	Win	18–1–2	Tony Diaz	KO	5 (10)	Apr 16, 1929	Jacksonville, Florida, US	
20	Loss	17–1–2	Glenn Chancey	PTS	10	Feb 6, 1929	Tinker Field, Orlando, Florida, US	
19	Win	17–0–2	Glenn Chancey	KO	3 (10)	Feb 1, 1929	Burgoyne Isle, Daytona Beach, Florida, US	
18	Draw	16–0–2	Glenn Chancey	PTS	10	Dec 11, 1928	Jacksonville, Florida, US	
17	Win	16–0–1	Judge Horning	KO	1 (?)	Dec 4, 1928	Jacksonville, Florida, US	
16	Win	15–0–1	Cowboy Boone	KO	2 (10)	Oct 5, 1928	Bainbridge, Georgia, US	
15	Win	14–0–1	Red Hancock	PTS	10	Sep 27, 1928	Eagle Sporting Arena, Tallahassee, Florida, US	
14	Draw	13–0–1	Red Hancock	PTS	10	Aug 29, 1928	Waycross, Georgia, US	
13	Win	13–0	Kenneth Kinsey	KO	5 (10)	Aug 2, 1928	Tobacco Warehouse, Cairo, Georgia, US	
12	Win	12–0	Kenneth Kinsey	KO	2 (8)	Jun 22, 1928	Panacea Springs, Florida, US	
11	Win	11–0	Jimmy Gordon	KO	2 (?)	Jun 19, 1928	Quitman, Georgia, US	
10	Win	10–0	Hollis Colley	KO	3 (6)	Apr 19, 1928	Stadium, Thomasville, Georgia, US	
9	Win	9–0	Jack Curtis	KO	2 (6)	Apr 6, 1928	Auditorium, Atlanta, Georgia, US	
8	Win	8–0	Tom O'Rourke	PTS	10	Mar 23, 1928	Ringside Club, Atlanta, Georgia, US	
7	Win	7–0	Harold Gates	PTS	6	Mar 16, 1928	Ringside Club, Atlanta, Georgia, US	
6	Win	6–0	Jim Farrell	TKO	4 (6)	Mar 9, 1928	Ringside Club, Atlanta, Georgia, US	
5	Win	5–0	Wingo Robinson	TKO	6 (6)	Feb 21, 1928	Ringside Club, Atlanta, Georgia, US	
4	Win	4–0	Wood Pace	PTS	6	Feb 14, 1928	Ringside Club, Atlanta, Georgia, US	
3	Win	3–0	Connie George	TKO	2 (8)	Jan 6, 1928	Grand Theater, Thomasville, Georgia, US	
2	Win	2–0	Battleship Sword	KO	? (?)	Nov 10, 1927	Tobacco Warehouse, Cairo, Georgia, US	
1	Win	1–0	Battleship Sword	KO	3 (10)	Oct 13, 1927	Copeland Park Pavilion, Cairo, Georgia, US	

=== Unofficial record ===
164 fights	125 wins	19 losses
By knockout	66	0
By decision	59	19
Draws	18	
No contests	2	

Record with the inclusion of newspaper decisions in the win/loss/draw column.

No.	Result	Record	Opponent	Type	Round	Date	Location	Notes
164	Win	125–19–18 (2)	Chet Gideon	PTS	10	Apr 19, 1938	American Legion Arena, Orlando, Florida, US	
163	Win	124–19–18 (2)	Pat McDuff	PTS	10	Apr 8, 1938	Legion Arena, West Palm Beach, Florida, US	
162	Win	123–19–18 (2)	Eddie Boyle	PTS	10	Mar 24, 1938	Beach Arena, Miami Beach, Florida, US	
161	Win	122–19–18 (2)	Harold Anderson	PTS	10	Mar 3, 1938	Beach Arena, Miami Beach, Florida, US	
160	Loss	121–19–18 (2)	Melio Bettina	PTS	10	Jun 18, 1937	Beach Arena, Miami Beach, Florida, US	
159	NC	121–18–18 (2)	Patsy Perroni	NC	7 (10)	Mar 31, 1937	Naval Armory, Detroit, Michigan, US	
158	Loss	121–18–18 (1)	Texas Joe Dundee	PTS	10	Oct 12, 1936	Lakeland, Florida, US	
157	Loss	121–17–18 (1)	Al Gainer	PTS	10	Jun 1, 1936	Hickey Park, Millvale, Pennsylvania, US	
156	Win	121–16–18 (1)	Max Marek	PTS	10	Apr 13, 1936	Beach Arena, Miami Beach, Florida, US	
155	Loss	120–16–18 (1)	Bob Godwin	UD	10	Apr 7, 1936	Legion Arena, West Palm Beach, Florida, US	
154	Win	120–15–18 (1)	Dewey Kimrey	PTS	10	Mar 19, 1936	Miami Stadium, Miami, Florida, US	
153	Win	119–15–18 (1)	Buck Everett	SD	12	Feb 3, 1936	Beach Arena, Miami Beach, Florida, US	
152	Draw	118–15–18 (1)	Patsy Perroni	PTS	10	Jan 17, 1936	Coliseum, Coral Gables, Florida, US	
151	Win	118–15–17 (1)	Wilson Dunn	PTS	10	Nov 28, 1935	Daytona Beach, Florida, US	
150	Win	117–15–17 (1)	George Blackburn	TKO	3 (10)	Nov 25, 1935	Beach Arena, Miami Beach, Florida, US	
149	Win	116–15–17 (1)	Buck Everett	PTS	10	Nov 14, 1935	Cinderella Ballroom, Miami, Florida, US	
148	Win	115–15–17 (1)	Carl Knowles	PTS	10	Oct 25, 1935	Savannah, Georgia, US	
147	Win	114–15–17 (1)	Salvatore Ruggirello	TKO	6 (10)	Sep 30, 1935	Beach Arena, Miami Beach, Florida, US	
146	Win	113–15–17 (1)	Pepon Gonzales	KO	8 (10)	Sep 22, 1935	Havana, Cuba	
145	Loss	112–15–17 (1)	Al McCoy	UD	15	Sep 5, 1935	Mount Royal Arena, Montreal, Quebec, Canada	For vacant world light heavyweight title (Montreal version)
144	Draw	112–14–17 (1)	Buck Everett	PTS	10	Aug 5, 1935	Beach Arena, Miami Beach, Florida, US	
143	Win	112–14–16 (1)	Benny O'Dell	KO	5 (10)	Jul 29, 1935	Infantry School Arena, Fort Benning, Georgia, US	
142	Win	111–14–16 (1)	Don 'Red' Barry	PTS	10	Jul 25, 1935	Savannah, Georgia, US	
141	Win	110–14–16 (1)	Dutch Weimer	PTS	10	Jul 23, 1935	Beach Arena, Miami Beach, Florida, US	
140	Win	109–14–16 (1)	Corn Griffin	RTD	4 (10)	Jul 4, 1935	Jacksonville Beach, Florida, US	
139	Win	108–14–16 (1)	Mickey Dugan	KO	5 (10)	Jul 1, 1935	Beach Arena, Miami Beach, Georgia, US	
138	Win	107–14–16 (1)	Charlie Baisden	PTS	10	Jun 27, 1935	Moultrie, Georgia, US	
137	Win	106–14–16 (1)	Tom Terry	KO	2 (10)	Jun 13, 1935	Hahira, Georgia, US	
136	Win	105–14–16 (1)	Paul Marques	PTS	10	Feb 19, 1935	Legion Arena, West Palm Beach, Florida, US	
135	Loss	104–14–16 (1)	Tony Shucco	MD	10	Feb 11, 1935	Cinderella Ballroom, Miami, Florida, US	
134	Draw	104–13–16 (1)	Tony Shucco	PTS	10	Jan 28, 1935	Municipal Stadium, Miami, Florida, US	
133	Win	104–13–15 (1)	Eddie Karolak	KO	2 (10)	Jan 10, 1935	Beach Arena, Miami Beach, Florida, US	
132	Win	103–13–15 (1)	Wilson Dunn	KO	3 (10)	Oct 22, 1934	City Auditorium, Galveston, Texas, US	
131	Win	102–13–15 (1)	Al Rodrigues	TKO	7 (12)	Oct 15, 1934	Coliseum, Coral Gables, Florida, US	
130	Win	101–13–15 (1)	Earl Johnson	TKO	7 (?)	Oct 2, 1934	Athens, Georgia, US	
129	Win	100–13–15 (1)	Rosy Rosales	PTS	10	Sep 28, 1934	Carolina Arena, Asheville, North Carolina, US	
128	Win	99–13–15 (1)	George Pavlick	PTS	10	Aug 2, 1934	Savannah, Georgia, US	
127	Win	98–13–15 (1)	Clyde Chastain	KO	6 (10)	Jul 23, 1934	Cinderella Ballroom, Miami, Florida, US	
126	Win	97–13–15 (1)	Leroy Brown	UD	10	Jul 16, 1934	Sullivan's Bowl, Charleston, South Carolina, US	Retained Southern light heavyweight title
125	Win	96–13–15 (1)	Rosy Rosales	PTS	10	Jul 6, 1934	Atlanta, Georgia, US	
124	Win	95–13–15 (1)	Henry Firpo	TKO	7 (10)	Jun 27, 1934	American Legion Arena, Washington, DC, US	
123	Win	94–13–15 (1)	Buck Everett	TKO	9 (10)	Jun 11, 1934	Cinderella Ballroom, Miami, Florida, US	
122	Win	93–13–15 (1)	Carl Knowles	TKO	10 (10)	Jun 8, 1934	Municipal Auditorium, Savannah, Georgia, US	
121	Win	92–13–15 (1)	Tony Cancela	UD	10	May 28, 1934	Cinderella Ballroom, Miami, Florida, US	
120	Loss	91–13–15 (1)	Tony Shucco	UD	10	May 11, 1934	Boston Garden, Boston, Massachusetts, US	
119	Win	91–12–15 (1)	Tex Leavelle	KO	4 (8)	Apr 17, 1934	Roanoke, Virginia, US	
118	Draw	90–12–15 (1)	Buck Everett	PTS	10	Apr 5, 1934	Coliseum, Coral Gables, Florida, US	
117	Win	90–12–14 (1)	Eddie Houghton	PTS	10	Mar 20, 1934	Legion Arena, West Palm Beach, Florida, US	
116	Win	89–12–14 (1)	Les Kennedy	KO	2 (10)	Mar 16, 1934	Cinderella Ballroom, Miami, Florida, US	
115	Draw	88–12–14 (1)	Maxie Rosenbloom	PTS	15	Feb 5, 1934	Madison Square Garden Stadium, Miami, Florida, US	For NYSAC, NBA, and The Ring light heavyweight titles
114	NC	88–12–13 (1)	Eddie McCarthy	NC	1 (10)	Nov 11, 1933	Municipal Stadium, Orlando, Florida, US	
113	Win	88–12–13	George Nichols	PTS	8	Nov 3, 1933	Madison Square Garden, New York City, New York, US	
112	Win	87–12–13	Bob Godwin	TKO	5 (10)	Oct 16, 1933	Biscayne Arena, Miami, Florida, US	
111	Win	86–12–13	Frankie Wine	PTS	10	Sep 22, 1933	Rome, Georgia, US	
110	Loss	85–12–13	Bob Godwin	SD	10	Aug 30, 1933	Twin City Arena, Laurel, Maryland, US	
109	Win	85–11–13	Joe Banovic	PTS	10	Aug 8, 1933	Twin City Arena, Laurel, Maryland, US	
108	Win	84–11–13	Battling Bozo	NWS	10	Jun 28, 1933	City Auditorium, Birmingham, Alabama, US	
107	Win	83–11–13	Lou Scozza	PTS	10	Jun 12, 1933	Biscayne Arena, Miami, Florida, US	
106	Win	82–11–13	Tiger Lemons	TKO	9 (?)	May 15, 1933	Sullivan's Bowl, Charleston, Georgia, US	
105	Win	81–11–13	Battling Bozo	UD	10	Apr 17, 1933	Municipal Auditorium, Macon, Georgia, US	
104	Win	80–11–13	Wild Bill Cox	PTS	10	Apr 3, 1933	City Auditorium, Macon, Georgia, US	
103	Win	79–11–13	Eric Lawson	PTS	10	Mar 14, 1933	Legion Arena, West Palm Beach, Florida, US	
102	Win	78–11–13	Tex Wallace	PTS	10	Mar 9, 1933	Waycross, Georgia, US	
101	Loss	77–11–13	Bob Godwin	PTS	10	Mar 1, 1933	Legion Arena, West Palm Beach, Florida, US	Lost NBA light heavyweight title
100	Win	77–10–13	Eddie McCarthy	RTD	6 (10)	Feb 20, 1933	Lakeland, Florida, US	
99	Win	76–10–13	Irving Ashkenazy	TKO	3 (10)	Feb 15, 1933	Leesburg, Florida, US	
98	Win	75–10–13	Battling Bozo	PTS	10	Feb 13, 1933	Daytona Beach, Florida, US	
97	Win	74–10–13	Romeo LeMon	PTS	10	Jan 13, 1933	Daytona Beach, Florida, US	
96	Win	73–10–13	Russ Rowsey	MD	10	Dec 29, 1932	Coliseum, Orlando, Florida, US	
95	Win	72–10–13	Owen Phelps	PTS	10	Dec 6, 1932	Portner's Arena, Alexandria, Virginia, US	Retained Southern light heavyweight title
94	Win	71–10–13	Charley Arthurs	TKO	6 (10)	Dec 2, 1932	Daytona Beach, Florida, US	
93	Win	70–10–13	Natie Brown	TKO	5 (10)	Nov 29, 1932	Jacksonville, Florida, US	
92	Win	69–10–13	Chick Raines	PTS	10	Nov 23, 1932	Savannah, Georgia, US	
91	Win	68–10–13	Cracker Smith	TKO	2 (10), 3:00	Nov 11, 1932	American Legion Arena, Tallahassee, Florida, US	
90	Win	67–10–13	Pietro Corri	PTS	10	Nov 9, 1932	Daytona Beach, Florida, US	
89	Win	66–10–13	George Nichols	UD	10	Oct 17, 1932	Sullivan's Bowl, Charleston, South Carolina, US	
88	Win	65–10–13	George Courtney	KO	5 (10)	Sep 19, 1932	Twin City Arena, Laurel, Maryland, US	
87	Win	64–10–13	Bob Tow	KO	4 (10)	Sep 7, 1932	Twin City Arena, Laurel, Maryland, US	
86	Win	63–10–13	Eric Lawson	KO	4 (10)	Aug 16, 1932	Biscayne Arena, Miami, Florida, US	
85	Win	62–10–13	Terry Roberts	TKO	1 (10)	Aug 5, 1932	Cinderella Ballroom, Miami, Florida, US	
84	Win	61–10–13	Bob Godwin	PTS	10	Jul 1, 1932	Daytona Beach, Florida, US	Won Southern light heavyweight title
83	Win	60–10–13	Eric Lawson	KO	9 (?)	Jun 20, 1932	Roanoke, Virginia, US	
82	Win	59–10–13	Willie Oster	PTS	10	Jun 6, 1932	Arena, Boston, Massachusetts, US	
81	Win	58–10–13	Charley Belanger	SD	10	May 23, 1932	Arena, Boston, Massachusetts, US	
80	Win	57–10–13	Maxie Rosenbloom	PTS	10	Mar 18, 1932	Daytona Beach, Florida, US	
79	Win	56–10–13	Don Petrin	KO	5 (10)	Feb 15, 1932	Biscayne Arena, Miami, Florida, US	
78	Loss	55–10–13	Bob Godwin	MD	10	Jan 20, 1932	Madison Square Garden Stadium, Miami, Florida, US	Lost Southern light heavyweight title
77	Win	55–9–13	Tony Cancela	PTS	10	Jan 7, 1932	Cinderella Ballroom, Miami, Florida, US	
76	Win	54–9–13	Joe Finazzo	KO	4 (10)	Dec 18, 1931	Legion Arena, Lake Worth, Florida, US	
75	Win	53–9–13	Don 'Red' Barry	PTS	10	Dec 3, 1931	Cinderella Ballroom, Miami, Florida, US	
74	Draw	52–9–13	Cyclone Smith	PTS	10	Nov 20, 1931	Savannah, Georgia, US	
73	Win	52–9–12	Jake Denning	PTS	10	Nov 10, 1931	Jacksonville, Florida, US	
72	Win	51–9–12	Jack Berry	KO	2 (10)	Oct 23, 1931	Johnson Hagood Stadium, Charleston, South Carolina, US	
71	Win	50–9–12	Leslie Beard	KO	1 (10)	Oct 9, 1931	Marianna, Florida, US	
70	Win	49–9–12	Monroe Porter	KO	1 (10)	Oct 5, 1931	Lakeland, Florida, US	
69	Win	48–9–12	Carl Knowles	TKO	8 (10), 1:00	Aug 20, 1931	Savannah, Georgia, US	
68	Win	47–9–12	Spike Webb	PTS	10	Aug 7, 1931	Cinderella Ballroom, Miami, Florida, US	
67	Win	46–9–12	Corn Griffin	PTS	10	Jul 7, 1931	Doughboy Stadium, Fort Benning, Georgia, US	
66	Loss	45–9–12	Spike Webb	PTS	10	Jul 3, 1931	Cinderella Ballroom, Miami, Florida, US	
65	Win	45–8–12	Bobby Evans	KO	5 (10)	Jun 12, 1931	Cinderella Ballroom, Miami, Florida, US	
64	Win	44–8–12	Yale Okun	KO	5 (12)	May 22, 1931	Cinderella Ballroom, Miami, Florida, US	
63	Win	43–8–12	Kid Bombero	KO	4 (10)	May 15, 1931	Waycross, Georgia, US	
62	Win	42–8–12	Bob Godwin	KO	8 (10)	Apr 30, 1931	Daytona Beach, Florida, US	Won Southern light heavyweight title
61	Win	41–8–12	Eric Lawson	PTS	15	Apr 16, 1931	Daytona Beach, Florida, US	
60	Loss	40–8–12	Bob Godwin	PTS	10	Apr 9, 1931	Daytona Beach, Florida, US	
59	Draw	40–7–12	Eric Lawson	PTS	10	Mar 6, 1931	American Legion Arena, Tallahassee, Florida, US	
58	Draw	40–7–11	Whitey Gorsline	PTS	6	Feb 25, 1931	Madison Square Garden Stadium, Miami, Florida, US	
57	Win	40–7–10	Phil Whitley	KO	3 (?)	Feb 19, 1931	Armory, Daytona Beach, Florida, US	
56	Win	39–7–10	Bill Thaler	PTS	10	Feb 3, 1931	Legion Armory, Saint Petersburg, Florida, US	
55	Win	38–7–10	Bobby Marriott	KO	2 (10)	Jan 26, 1931	Legion Arena, Lakeland, Florida, US	
54	Loss	37–7–10	Eric Lawson	PTS	8	Jan 2, 1931	Oasis, Portsmouth, Virginia, US	
53	Win	37–6–10	Jack O'Hara	KO	4 (10)	Dec 22, 1930	Elks Club, Quincy, Florida, US	
52	Win	36–6–10	Cyclone Smith	TKO	6 (?)	Nov 7, 1930	Savannah, Georgia, US	
51	Win	35–6–10	Russ Rowsey	KO	4 (?)	Nov 3, 1930	Roanoke, Virginia, US	
50	Draw	34–6–10	Kid Williams	PTS	10	Oct 10, 1930	Waycross, Georgia, US	
49	Win	34–6–9	Russ Rowsey	PTS	10	Sep 30, 1930	Roanoke, Virginia, US	Second fight in one day
48	Draw	33–6–9	Eric Lawson	PTS	10	Sep 30, 1930	Roanoke, Virginia, US	
47	Loss	33–6–8	Billy Schwartz	PTS	10	Sep 15, 1930	Roanoke, Virginia, US	
46	Draw	33–5–8	Bob Godwin	PTS	10	Aug 22, 1930	Waycross, Georgia, US	
45	Win	33–5–7	Bob Tow	PTS	10	Aug 5, 1930	City Gymnasium, Atlanta, Georgia, US	
44	Win	32–5–7	Willie Ptomey	KO	2 (?)	Jul 8, 1930	Knoxville, Tennessee, US	
43	Loss	31–5–7	Ernesto Sagues	PTS	10	May 30, 1930	Waycross A.C. Gymnasium, Waycross, Georgia, US	
42	Draw	31–4–7	Corn Griffin	PTS	8	May 13, 1930	Fort Benning Arena, Fort Benning, Georgia, US	
41	Win	31–4–6	Lockjaw Pike	KO	2 (?)	Apr 18, 1930	Sterchi Park Arena, Knoxville, Tennessee, US	
40	Win	30–4–6	Corn Griffin	PTS	8	Apr 17, 1930	Chattanooga, Tennessee, US	
39	Win	29–4–6	Lew Carpenter	KO	4 (10)	Mar 28, 1930	Jaycee Gymnasium, Waycross, Georgia, US	
38	Draw	28–4–6	Cyclone Smith	PTS	10	Mar 25, 1930	Fort Benning Arena, Fort Benning, Georgia, US	
37	Draw	28–4–5	Joe King	PTS	10	Mar 17, 1930	Quincy, Florida, US	
36	Win	28–4–4	Gus Papst	TKO	1 (10)	Mar 14, 1930	Jaycee Gymnasium, Waycross, Georgia, US	
35	Win	27–4–4	Cyclone Smith	PTS	10	Mar 7, 1930	Tobacco Warehouse, Cairo, Georgia, US	
34	Win	26–4–4	Chief Wilbur	PTS	10	Jan 24, 1930	Benjamin Field Arena, Tampa, Florida, US	
33	Loss	25–4–4	Raul Rojas	PTS	10	Jan 7, 1930	Waterfront Park, Saint Petersburg, Florida, US	
32	Win	25–3–4	Jackie Baker	PTS	10	Dec 23, 1929	Copeland Park Pavilion, Cairo, Georgia, US	
31	Win	24–3–4	Johnny Williams	KO	2 (10)	Nov 11, 1929	Centennial Field, Tallahassee, Florida, US	
30	Win	23–3–4	OK Thomas	KO	3 (10)	Sep 24, 1929	Tobacco Warehouse, Cairo, Georgia, US	
29	Win	22–3–4	Glenn Chancey	PTS	10	Sep 19, 1929	Centennial Field, Tallahassee, Florida, US	
28	Win	21–3–4	Brady O'Hara	PTS	10	Aug 27, 1929	Tobacco Warehouse, Cairo, Georgia, US	
27	Win	20–3–4	Spike Kelly	TKO	4 (10)	Aug 15, 1929	Centennial Field, Tallahassee, Florida, US	
26	Win	19–3–4	Kid Bombero	KO	5 (10)	Aug 13, 1929	Tobacco Warehouse, Cairo, Georgia, US	
25	Draw	18–3–4	Brady O'Hara	PTS	10	Jul 18, 1929	Centennial Field, Tallahassee, Florida, US	
24	Loss	18–3–3	Glenn Chancey	PTS	10	Jul 2, 1929	Jacksonville, Florida, US	
23	Loss	18–2–3	Brady O'Hara	PTS	10	Apr 30, 1929	Jacksonville, Florida, US	
22	Draw	18–1–3	Glenn Chancey	PTS	10	Apr 23, 1929	Waterfront Park, Saint Petersburg, Florida, US	
21	Win	18–1–2	Tony Diaz	KO	5 (10)	Apr 16, 1929	Jacksonville, Florida, US	
20	Loss	17–1–2	Glenn Chancey	PTS	10	Feb 6, 1929	Tinker Field, Orlando, Florida, US	
19	Win	17–0–2	Glenn Chancey	KO	3 (10)	Feb 1, 1929	Burgoyne Isle, Daytona Beach, Florida, US	
18	Draw	16–0–2	Glenn Chancey	PTS	10	Dec 11, 1928	Jacksonville, Florida, US	
17	Win	16–0–1	Judge Horning	KO	1 (?)	Dec 4, 1928	Jacksonville, Florida, US	
16	Win	15–0–1	Cowboy Boone	KO	2 (10)	Oct 5, 1928	Bainbridge, Georgia, US	
15	Win	14–0–1	Red Hancock	PTS	10	Sep 27, 1928	Eagle Sporting Arena, Tallahassee, Florida, US	
14	Draw	13–0–1	Red Hancock	PTS	10	Aug 29, 1928	Waycross, Georgia, US	
13	Win	13–0	Kenneth Kinsey	KO	5 (10)	Aug 2, 1928	Tobacco Warehouse, Cairo, Georgia, US	
12	Win	12–0	Kenneth Kinsey	KO	2 (8)	Jun 22, 1928	Panacea Springs, Florida, US	
11	Win	11–0	Jimmy Gordon	KO	2 (?)	Jun 19, 1928	Quitman, Georgia, US	
10	Win	10–0	Hollis Colley	KO	3 (6)	Apr 19, 1928	Stadium, Thomasville, Georgia, US	
9	Win	9–0	Jack Curtis	KO	2 (6)	Apr 6, 1928	Auditorium, Atlanta, Georgia, US	
8	Win	8–0	Tom O'Rourke	PTS	10	Mar 23, 1928	Ringside Club, Atlanta, Georgia, US	
7	Win	7–0	Harold Gates	PTS	6	Mar 16, 1928	Ringside Club, Atlanta, Georgia, US	
6	Win	6–0	Jim Farrell	TKO	4 (6)	Mar 9, 1928	Ringside Club, Atlanta, Georgia, US	
5	Win	5–0	Wingo Robinson	TKO	6 (6)	Feb 21, 1928	Ringside Club, Atlanta, Georgia, US	
4	Win	4–0	Wood Pace	PTS	6	Feb 14, 1928	Ringside Club, Atlanta, Georgia, US	
3	Win	3–0	Connie George	TKO	2 (8)	Jan 6, 1928	Grand Theater, Thomasville, Georgia, US	
2	Win	2–0	Battleship Sword	KO	? (?)	Nov 10, 1927	Tobacco Warehouse, Cairo, Georgia, US	
1	Win	1–0	Battleship Sword	KO	3 (10)	Oct 13, 1927	Copeland Park Pavilion, Cairo, Georgia, US	

== Primary boxing achievements ==
Achievements
Preceded by George Nichols, Stripped	NBA Light Heavyweight Champion; February 28, 1933– March 1, 1933	Succeeded by Bob Godwin
