= George Nichols (boxer) =

American boxer

Personal information
- Nickname: Johnny Nichols
- Born: Phillip John Nicolosi; Philip Joseph Nicolasi; July 10, 1907 Sandusky, Ohio, US
- Died: September 27, 1986 (aged 79) Sandusky, Ohio, US
- Height: 5 ft 10.5 in (1.79 m)
- Weight: Light heavyweight

Boxing career
- Stance: Southpaw

Boxing record
- Total fights: 140
- Wins: 94
- Win by KO: 33
- Losses: 34
- Draws: 11
- No contests: 1

George Nichols (born Phillip John Nicolosi) (10 July 1907 – 27 September 1986) was an American boxer who took the National Boxing Association World Light Heavyweight title by defeating Dave Maier on March 18, 1932, in Chicago.

== Early life and career highlights ==
Phillip John Nicolosi, was born on July 10, 1907, in Sandusky, Ohio, to Italian immigrant parents Ida and Thomas. During their lives, the family used more than one Anglicized spelling of their Italian surname, though Nicolosi's public and ringname remained George Nichols. He would become a quite capable boxer with good ringcraft who fought the best competition of his era.

On January 30, 1928, he lost to the exceptional black middleweight contender Jack McVey in Rochester, New York, in a ten-round technical knockout. The bout was stopped by the referee in the final round with Nichols hanging helplessly on the ropes. McVey won every round, efficiently landing both head and body shots. Nichols lost again to McVey in a ten-round points decision in Buffalo, New York, in October of that year with both boxers fighting as welterweights. On August 25, 1931, Nichols finally defeated McVey, at least by newspaper decision, in a ten-round battle in Sandusky, Ohio. Nichols used speed, timing and a strong right to control the bout. The Associated Press gave Nichols every round, with the possible exception of the first and sixth. Nichols began to take a deciding margin on points in the third and fourth with consistent attacks. Nichols seemed on the verge of a knockout in the eighth through tenth, but McVey stayed on his feet throughout the bout using great defensive skills.

Osk Till, a Light Heavy contender, fell to Nichols in a six-round points decision at the Broadway Ballroom in Buffalo on November 25, 1929.

Harry Fuller drew with Nichols on February 10, 1930, in six rounds in Buffalo. The middleweights fought a lively bout.

Nichols defeated Henry Firpo on March 24, 1930, in Oil City, Pennsylvania. The pace of the bout was unpopular with the crowd of 15,000 as both boxers moved slowly using caution and careful ringcraft in their defense. Nichol's trusty left had little snap against the effective blocking of Firpo. Nichols, the aggressor, led for the first seven rounds. The pace increased in the final three heats with Nichols breaking the close margin in the tenth which he won handily.

Tiger Thomas lost to Nichols on July 25, 1930, in a close but controversial six-round decision. The referee gave Thomas four of the six rounds for his aggressive two armed technique, though both judges scored for Nichols who clearly led in the early rounds. The crowd of 3000 booed the ruling, believing the bout belonged to Thomas, the local boxer. Though Thomas staged a gallant come back in the closing rounds, it was too late to take the decision.

Nichols outpointed accomplished black middleweight Sunny Jim Williams in a ten-round points decision on November 11, 1930, in Franklin, Pennsylvania. Williams may have lost the favor of the judges as a result of his defensive posture through much of the bout. Nichols used his powerful left in the fourth and sixth to bring his opponent close to a knockout but Nichols weathered the attack exhibiting endurance and a skilled elusive strategy. In the middle of the forth, Nichols staggered his opponent with a left to the face that nearly led to a knockout, but for the sounding of the bell. Williams finally went down for a no count at the start of the fifth. One reporter gave Williams only the fifth, with seven rounds to Nichols and two even.

Nichols gained an easy victory over Charley Belanger, the Light Heavy Champion of Canada, on December 3, 1930, at the Broadway Auditorium in Buffalo, New York. Nichols won handily taking seven of the ten rounds, that put him on course for the Light Heavyweight championship.

Rosy Rosales fell to Nichols in a fourth-round technical knockout on June 15, 1931, at Braves Field in Boston. Though a close fight, Nichols seemed dominant. In the fourth, Rosales, suffering from a cut to his eye dropped to the mat without being hit, and the referee stopped the bout.

Nichols met Leo Laravee on July 13, 1931, winning a ten-round points decision at Brave's Field in Boston. Nichols floored Laravee for nine in the eighth, but he came off the deck gave his rival a great match through the final bell. In the enthralling clash of middleweights, Nichols stung his rival with his powerful left but Laravee fought back stronger than before. After being floored in the eighth, Laravee fought back with a two fisted barrage that thwarted Nichol's attempts at a knockout. Nichols appeared to have a slight edge in seven of the ten rounds.

Nichols won a decisive newspaper decision against powerful puncher Chuck Burns on October 1, 1931, at Esmund Athletic Field in Sandusky, Ohio. One reporter gave eight rounds to Nichols, one round for Burns and one round a draw. Nichols entered the ring with bruised and swollen hands that apparently affected his ability to deliver a knockout punch or even knock his opponent to the mat. Nichols displayed his characteristic strong left and right jab and remained the aggressor through much of the bout. Burns opened up in the tenth to take the round by a slight edge. Nichols had defeated Burns earlier in December 1930 in Buffalo, New York.

== Participating in the NBA Middle and Light Heavy championships ==
Nichols had an easy time defeating black boxer Snowflake Wright on September 25, 1931, taking all ten of the bout's rounds. Wright, however, showed determination in avoiding a knockdown, even in the heated tenth round where he fended off Nichol's lefts to the face and body. At the end, Nichols lacked the punch to end the bout, though Nichols was at his mercy. The bout was the first round of the NBA Middleweight elimination tournament.

On November 3, 1931, Nichols withdrew from the tournament after losing to future American and NBA World Middleweight champion Gorilla Jones in the Quarterfinals. Jones, the exceptional Black boxer from Akron, Ohio, would advance to the final round and take the Middleweight title on January 25, defeating Oddone Piazza.

After the tournament, Nichols lost to Dave Maier in a seventh-round technical knockout on November 27, 1931, in Buffalo. In the sixth, Nichols received a bad cut near his eye. Facing a furious barrage of punches, Nichols was down twice in the seventh for counts of nine before Maier put him to the mat for the final time.

=== Opening rounds, Light Heavy Tournament ===
Don Petrin lost to Nichols on December 30, 1931, in the second round of the NBA World Light Heavyweight Tournament. Nichols scored a technical knockout over Petrin one minute into the fifth round of eight in Chicago, though he had taken considerable punishment in the early rounds. A terrific left hook to the chin of Petrin landed him on the mat for a count of nine. Nichols then closed the bout with rights and lefts nearly knocking his opponent out of the ring. The referee called the bout with Petrin hanging over the ropes, and unable to mount a defense.

In the third round of the NBA tournament, on January 15, 1932, Nichols defeated Charley Bellanger in a ten-round points decision. Nichols knocked down Belanger for a count of nine in the fifth, and broadened his margin in the remaining rounds. Bellanger, who had a nine-pound weight advantage, used his experience in ringcraft to weather the remainder of the bout.

== NBA Light Heavyweight tournament, 1932 ==
Nichols scored a decisive victory over Lou Scozza on January 28, 1932, in the fourth round of the NBA light heavyweight elimination tournament in Chicago. Nichols began to pile up a points margin in the second round when he scored with a left to Scozza's jaw.

In the semi-final round of the NBA tournament on February 18, 1932, before a crowd of 23,000, Billy Jones fell to Nichols in a ten-round points decision. Many in the large crowd were there to see Jack Dempsey fight Kingfish Levinsky in a preliminary exhibition. Nichols's win stunned many ringside as Jones was favored to reach the final bout and take the championship. An enthralled audience watched him down his opponent twice in the second round, once for a count of nine, and once for a count of two. He downed Jones again in the fourth for a long count of nine. Nichols was only down briefly in the fifth. Though his opponent finished strong in the final rounds, Nichols had amassed too large a points margin and won the decision.

=== Taking the NBA World Light Heavyweight title ===
Nichols took the NBA Light Heavyweight title in a shocking upset against fellow Southpaw Dave Maier in a close decision on March 18, 1932, in Chicago. The match was the deciding round in the NBA Light Heavyweight championship elimination tournament. Nichols, who had previously lost to Maier, was a 100-1 underdog in the early betting. Outpunching and outboxing his opponent, Nichols fought back ferociously any time he was cornered. He scored well in the fourth with lefts to the head and jaw, knocking Maier sagging into a corner, and turning the tide of contest.

Nichols won a fifth-round technical knockout against Red Fitzsimmons, of Wichita in Colorado Springs on July 22, 1932.

Nichols dropped a ten-round points decision to Ham Jenkins on July 29, 1932, in Denver. As both boxers were under the Light Heavyweight Limit, the match was not for the title. Jenkins may have won the infighting by a shade, and finished strong in the closing rounds.

Joe Knight defeated Nichols in Charleston, South Carolina, on October 17, 1932, in a decisive ten-round decision, though no title was on the line. Knight charged into his opponent from the opening bell, and Nichols failed to take a round.

On October 28, 1932, Nichols lost a furious ten round points decision to Adolph Heuser at the Arena in Boston. Uncharacteristically, Nichols was down five time in the first round. Fighting fatigue, he went the full ten but lost ground badly in the closing rounds.

== Losing the NBA Light Heavyweight title ==
Nichols was stripped of his title on December 17, 1932, for failing to defend it within eight months.

He lost to Al Gainer on May 15, 1933, in a ten-round points decision, the feature bout at the Arena in New Haven. Nichols appeared to take the second through fifth, while the remaining rounds fell to Gainer by a considerable margin. Nichols was down four times in the bout. He would lose again to Gainer on April 20, 1936, in an eighth-round technical knockout in Pittsburgh. The referee halted the bout between the eighth and ninth rounds due to cuts on Nichol's forehead and over his right eye. Nichols had been down for a nine count from a left hook to the jaw in the seventh. Though Gainer was a formidable opponent, Nichols seemed unwilling to take the lead in the bout, and clinched frequently in defense.

On June 12, 1933, Nichols faced Frankie O'Brien in a ten-round points decision in Hartford. The going was slow in the first seven rounds from Nichols careful defense, though the pace roused jeers of derision from the crowd. Nichols was credited with five rounds, and O'Brien three. Nichols clinched the decision in the final three rounds with vicious left hooks to the head and body of his opponent.

He lost to Sammy Slaughter on July 6, 1933, in a ten-round points decision in Chicago. Slaughter was down five times in the first round. Three of Slaughter's knockdowns were from lefts for counts of nine. Nichols may have lost the decision for fading in the final rounds, and not appearing to take the lead in the fighting. Nichol's defensive posture allowed Slaughter to scored frequently with straight lefts to the head and rights to the body. On July 17, 1933, Nichols lost to Norman Conrad in a ten-round points decision in Bedford, New Hampshire. He defeated Martin Levandowski on August 10, 1933, in a seventh-round technical knockout.

He drew with Harry English, an accomplished contender for the Colored Light Heavyweight Title, on December 18, 1933. The Toledo Blade gave seven rounds to Nichols, and only two to his opponent.

Before a crowd of 23,000 on February 5, 1934, Nichols defeated George Manley in a five-round semi-final bout at Miami's Madison Square Garden. Many in the crowd had come to see Joe Knight fight Max Rosenbloom to a draw in the title bout.

On September 16, 1935, using a five-pound weight advantage, Nichols outscored fringe middleweight contender Tony Tozzo in a six-round points decision in Buffalo. Though stripped of the title, Nichols fought on, finding a number of quality opponents.

Allen Matthews fell to Nichols on July 8, 1936, before 10,000 fans in a ten-round points decision in Chicago. Matthews skillfully landed a blow over Nichols left eye in the opening round, but may have ultimately had difficulty adjusting to his opponent's Southpaw style. Matthews was down for a no count from a blow to the face in the fifth. In a strong finish, Nichols floored Matthews with a left to the jaw for a count of nine in the ninth.

Before a sizable crowd of 10,000, Nichols lost a non-title ten-round decision against John Henry Lewis, reigning Light Heavyweight Champion, at Municipal Auditorium in St. Louis, Missouri, on August 12, 1936. Nichols impressively staggered the champion in the fifth with a crushing left, but Lewis piled up points in all the other rounds, and had Nichols hanging on groggily in the eighth and ninth.

Nichols had drawn with Lewis on April 7, 1936, at Broadway Auditorium in Buffalo. He used a hard left effectively throughout the bout, often posing it near Lewis's face.

== Life away from the ring ==
He married national speed skating champion, Kit Klein in 1933 in Ripley, New York, but the marriage was brief and quickly annulled. He was married to Bertie Horn during his boxing career, and throughout his retirement from the ring.

Several sources report Nichols died on September 27, 1986, in Sandusky, Ohio. In 1997, he was in the first class inducted into Buffalo, New York's Ring 44 Boxing Hall of Fame.

== Primary boxing achievements ==
Achievements
Preceded by Maxie Rosenbloom	NBA Light Heavyweight Champion; March 18, 1932– Stripped, December 17, 1932	Succeeded by Joe Knight
