= Mickey Walker (boxer) =

American boxer (1903–1981)

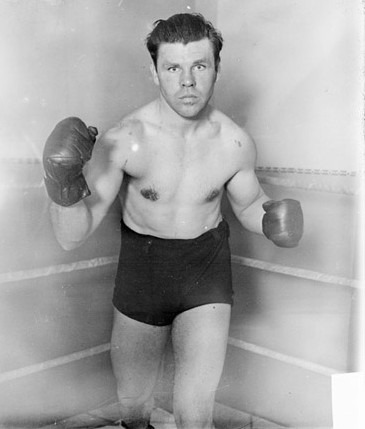

Personal information
- Nicknames: The Toy Bulldog and The Rumson Bulldog
- Born: Edward Patrick Walker; July 13, 1901 Elizabeth, New Jersey, U.S.
- Died: April 28, 1981 (aged 79)
- Height: 5 ft 7 in (1.70 m)
- Weight: Welterweight; Middleweight; Light Heavyweight; Heavyweight

Boxing career
- Reach: 67 in (170 cm)
- Stance: Orthodox

Boxing record
- Total fights: 164
- Wins: 131
- Win by KO: 60
- Losses: 25
- Draws: 6
- No contests: 2

Edward Patrick "Mickey" Walker (July 13, 1903 (some sources indicate 1901) – April 28, 1981) was an American professional boxer who held both the Undisputed World Welterweight and Undisputed World Middleweight Championships at different points in his career.

Born in Elizabeth, New Jersey, he was also an avid golfer and would later be recognized as a renowned artist. Mickey Walker lived in Rumson, New Jersey, where he trained and was known as "The Rumson Bulldog". He married Maude Kelly in 1923, and they settled in Rumson with their two children. Walker was nicknamed "The Rumson Bulldog" by the press, which he reportedly liked. The Rumson Fair-Haven Regional High School later adopted the "Bulldogs" mascot, a nod to their famous resident.

Walker is widely considered one of the greatest fighters ever, with ESPN ranking him 17th on their list of the 50 Greatest Boxers of All-Time and boxing historian Bert Sugar placing him 11th in his Top 100 Fighters catalogue. Statistical website BoxRec rates Walker as the 6th best boxer to have ended his career at middleweight, while The Ring Magazine founder Nat Fleischer placed him at No. 4 among greatest middleweights of all time. The International Boxing Research Organization ranked Walker as the No. 4 middleweight and the No. 16 pound-for-pound fighter of all time. Walker was inducted into the Ring magazine Hall of Fame in 1957 and the International Boxing Hall of Fame as a first-class member in 1990.

== Professional career ==
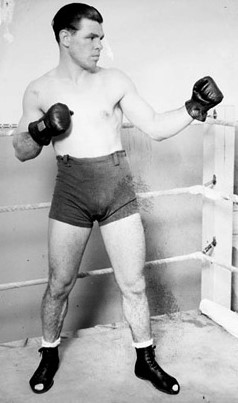
Portrait of Walker

=== Career beginnings ===
Walker boxed professionally for the first time on February 10, 1919, fighting Dominic Orsini to a four-round no-decision in his hometown of Elizabeth, New Jersey. Walker did not venture from Elizabeth until his eighteenth bout, when he went to fight at Newark. On April 29, 1919, he was defeated by knockout in round one by Phil Delmontt, suffering his first defeat.

In 1920, he boxed twelve times, winning two and participating in ten no-decisions. Once again, all his bouts were held in New Jersey, which was, at the time, one of the areas where scoring systems had not been instituted in boxing. Each fight that lasted the scheduled distance was automatically declared a no-decision, regardless of who the better boxer had been.

=== World welterweight champion ===
Walker boxed sixteen times in 1921, winning six, losing one and having nine no-decisions. By then, Rhode Island had become one of the areas where decisions from points scoring had been legislated and this attracted Walker. He lost on a disqualification to Joe Stenafik his first time there, but earned his first decision win in twelve rounds against Kid Green the second time around. He also met world champion boxer Jack Britton in a no-decision in New Jersey and beat Nate Siegal in Boston.

In 1922, Walker went 3–4–4 before getting a world title shot. He lost to Jock Malone that year. However, on November 1, 1922, he fought for the world welterweight title against Britton, the reigning champion. Walker outpointed Britton over fifteen rounds to take the title.

=== Walker vs. Greb ===
Walker had thirteen fights in 1923, winning 11, having one no-decision and one no contest. He defended the title twice, against Pete Latzo and Jimmy Jones. Nine bouts followed in 1924, Walker winning six and having three no decisions. He defeated Lew Tendler and Bobby Barrett in defense of his world title and had two of his three no-decisions that year against Jock Malone.

After winning two fights to start 1925, he went up in division to challenge world middleweight champion Harry Greb on July 2 but failed to win the middleweight crown at that time, losing a fifteen-round decision to the 160-pound (73 kg) division champion. He went back to the welterweight division, defending his title against Dave Shade and retaining it by decision. He won three bouts, lost one and had three no-decisions that year.

=== World middleweight champion ===
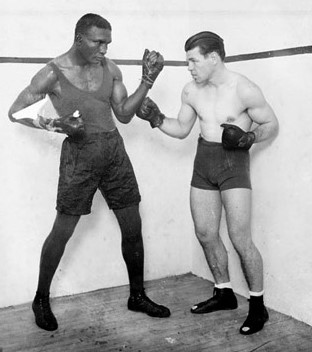
Walker (right), posing with Tiger Flowers before their 1926 title bout

On May 20, 1926, Walker lost the world welterweight title in a rematch with Pete Latzo. It seemed Walker, now in his 20s, had physically matured out the welterweight division, though many might also point to his extra-curricular activities. Whatever the reasons, Walker then began concentrating on winning the world middleweight championship. On November 22, he finally was able to beat Jock Malone. On December 3, he claimed the world middleweight title with a controversial ten-round decision over world champion Tiger Flowers. He kept that title for five years, defending it three times. He beat Mike McTigue and former world champion Paul Berlenbach.

On March 28, 1929, he tried to become a member of the exclusive group of boxers who have been world champions in three different weight divisions, but lost a close ten-round decision to world light heavyweight champion Tommy Loughran. On June 19, 1931, Walker decided to vacate his world middleweight title and move up to the heavyweight division.

=== Later career ===
Walker's debut as a heavyweight on July 22 against former world heavyweight champion Jack Sharkey ended with a fifteen-round draw (tie). In 1932, he went 5–1, beating such fighters as King Levinsky and Paulino Uzcudun before facing former world heavyweight champion Max Schmeling, who knocked Walker out in round eight.

He went down in weight again, to the light heavyweight division in 1933, when he lost a fifteen-round decision to Maxie Rosenbloom for the world title. The next year, Walker fought Rosenbloom again and was awarded a decision win. Unfortunately for Walker, Rosenbloom remained the champion, having taken Walker on in a non-title fight. Undaunted, Walker kept campaigning in that division until 1935, when he retired after losing to Eric Seelig by a seven-round technical knockout.

== Retirement and death ==
After retiring from boxing, Walker opened a New York City restaurant that became a popular landmark. He became an accomplished painter, with many of his works exhibited at New York and London art galleries. During his boxing career, he found golf to be a suitable distraction to his training regimen and he often dragged his manager, Doc Kearns, and his kids to golf courses to play golf.

Walker said on the January 13, 1955 "You Bet Your Life" show that he was married and had two daughters. He also said he "fought a draw for the heavyweight title."

Walker was found by police in 1974 lying on a street in Freehold, NJ and taken to a hospital, where he was admitted with doctors initially thinking he was just a drunk lying on the street. Tests revealed Walker was suffering from Parkinson's Syndrome, arteriosclerosis and anemia. He was admitted to Marlboro Psychiatric Hospital for treatment. He died on April 28, 1981, in Freehold.

== Professional boxing record ==
All information in this section is derived from BoxRec, unless otherwise stated.

=== Official record ===
164 fights	94 wins	19 losses
By knockout	60	6
By decision	33	11
By disqualification	1	2
Draws	4	
No contests	2	
Newspaper decisions/draws	45	

All newspaper decisions are officially regarded as “no decision” bouts and are not counted in the win/loss/draw column.

No.	Result	Record	Opponent	Type	Round	Date	Location	Notes
164	Loss	94–19–4 (47)	Erich Seelig	TKO	7 (10)	Dec 2, 1935	St. Nicholas Arena, New York City, New York, U.S.	
163	Win	94–18–4 (47)	Mickey McAvoy	KO	2 (8)	Oct 25, 1935	Kalurah Temple, Binghamton, Alabama, U.S.	
162	Win	93–18–4 (47)	Eddie Whalen	TKO	3 (10)	Sep 26, 1935	Odd Fellows' Hall, Albany, New York, U.S.	
161	Win	92–18–4 (47)	Charley Weise	PTS	6	Sep 20, 1935	Luna Park Arena, New York City, New York, U.S.	
160	Win	91–18–4 (47)	Joe Gorman	PTS	8	Sep 12, 1935	Fort Hamilton Arena, New York City, New York, U.S.	
159	Win	90–18–4 (47)	Thys Menger	KO	2 (8)	Aug 29, 1935	Fort Hamilton Arena, New York City, New York, U.S.	
158	Win	89–18–4 (47)	Lou Poster	KO	2 (10)	Aug 12, 1935	Arena Stadium, Philadelphia, Pennsylvania, U.S.	
157	Loss	88–18–4 (47)	John Andersson	PTS	6	Jul 29, 1935	Dexter Park Arena, Woodhaven, New York City, New York, U.S.	
156	Loss	88–17–4 (47)	Paul Pirrone	KO	11 (12)	Dec 3, 1934	Convention Hall, Philadelphia, Pennsylvania, U.S.	
155	Win	88–16–4 (47)	Tait Littman	PTS	10	Nov 26, 1934	Duquesne Garden, Pittsburgh, Pennsylvania, U.S.	
154	Loss	87–16–4 (47)	Paul Pirrone	MD	10	Nov 12, 1934	Arena, Philadelphia, Pennsylvania, U.S.	
153	Draw	87–15–4 (47)	Natie Brown	PTS	10	Oct 24, 1934	Auditorium, Washington, D.C., U.S.	
152	Loss	87–15–3 (47)	Young Corbett III	PTS	10	Aug 14, 1934	Seals Stadium, San Francisco, U.S.	
151	Win	87–14–3 (47)	Maxie Rosenbloom	PTS	10	May 8, 1934	Olympic Auditorium, Los Angeles, U.S.	
150	Draw	86–14–3 (47)	Bob Godwin	PTS	10	Apr 13, 1934	Civic Auditorium, San Francisco, California, U.S.	
149	Win	86–14–2 (47)	Maxie Maxwell	TKO	5 (10)	Apr 6, 1934	Coliseum, San Diego, California, U.S.	
148	Win	85–14–2 (47)	Tom Patrick	PTS	10	Mar 29, 1934	Legion Stadium, Hollywood, California, U.S.	
147	Draw	84–14–2 (47)	Bob Godwin	PTS	10	Jan 29, 1934	Dixie Theatre, West Palm Beach, Florida, U.S.	
146	Win	84–14–1 (47)	Les Kennedy	KO	2 (10)	Dec 4, 1933	Laurel Garden, Newark, New Jersey, U.S.	
145	Loss	83–14–1 (47)	Maxie Rosenbloom	UD	15	Nov 3, 1933	Madison Square Garden, New York City, New York, U.S.	For NYSAC, NBA, and The Ring light-heavyweight titles
144	Loss	83–13–1 (47)	Lou Brouillard	PTS	10	Jul 6, 1933	Boston Garden, Boston, Massachusetts, U.S.	
143	Win	83–12–1 (47)	George Manley	PTS	10	Apr 24, 1933	Civic Auditorium, San Francisco, California, U.S.	
142	Win	82–12–1 (47)	Arthur De Kuh	KO	1 (10)	Dec 6, 1932	Olympic Auditorium, Los Angeles, California, U.S.	
141	Loss	81–12–1 (47)	Max Schmeling	TKO	8 (15)	Sep 26, 1932	Madison Square Garden Bowl, Long Island City, New York City, New York, U.S.	
140	Win	81–11–1 (47)	Salvatore Ruggirello	KO	1 (10)	Jul 25, 1932	Dreamland Park, Newark, New Jersey, U.S.	
139	Loss	80–11–1 (47)	Johnny Risko	UD	12	Jun 24, 1932	Municipal Stadium, Cleveland, Ohio, U.S.	
138	Win	80–10–1 (47)	Paulino Uzcudun	PTS	10	May 26, 1932	Madison Square Garden, New York City, New York, U.S.	
137	Win	79–10–1 (47)	King Levinsky	SD	10	Apr 29, 1932	Chicago Stadium, Chicago, Illinois, U.S.	
136	Win	78–10–1 (47)	Jimmy Mahoney	TKO	2 (10)	Mar 11, 1932	McCullough's Arena, Salt Lake City, Utah, U.S.	
135	Win	77–10–1 (47)	Jackie Williams	KO	2 (10)	Mar 8, 1932	City Auditorium, Denver, Colorado, U.S.	
134	Win	76–10–1 (47)	Jack Gagnon	KO	1 (10)	Aug 17, 1931	Bison Stadium, Buffalo, New York, U.S.	
133	Draw	75–10–1 (47)	Jack Sharkey	PTS	15	Jul 22, 1931	Ebbets Field, New York City, New York, U.S.	
132	Win	75–10 (47)	Bearcat Wright	PTS	10	Apr 10, 1931	Auditorium, Omaha, Nebraska, U.S.	
131	Win	74–10 (47)	Johnny Risko	UD	10	Feb 25, 1931	Madison Square Garden Stadium, Miami, Florida, U.S.	
130	Win	73–10 (47)	Joe Lohman	TKO	6 (10)	Jan 23, 1931	Armory, Grand Rapids, Michigan, U.S.	
129	Win	72–10 (47)	Herman Weiner	KO	1 (10)	Jan 19, 1931	104th Regiment Armory, Baltimore, Maryland, U.S.	
128	Win	71–10 (47)	Matt Adgie	TKO	1 (10)	Jan 12, 1931	Arena, Philadelphia, Pennsylvania, U.S.	
127	Win	70–10 (47)	KO Christner	KO	1 (10)	Nov 28, 1930	Coliseum, Chicago, Illinois, U.S.	
126	Win	69–10 (47)	Johnny Risko	PTS	10	Nov 7, 1930	Olympia Stadium, Detroit, Michigan, U.S.	
125	Win	68–10 (47)	Homer Sheridan	KO	1 (10)	Oct 22, 1930	Forum, Wichita, Kansas, U.S.	
124	Win	67–10 (47)	Tiger Johnny Cline	KO	2 (10)	Oct 17, 1930	Gayety Theater, Saint Louis, Missouri, U.S.	
123	Win	66–10 (47)	Mike Mandell	TKO	1 (10)	Oct 13, 1930	Coliseum, Des Moines, Iowa, U.S.	
122	Win	65–10 (47)	Del Fontaine	KO	4 (10)	Oct 3, 1930	Auditorium, Saint Paul, Minnesota, U.S.	
121	Win	64–10 (47)	Paul Swiderski	KO	3 (10)	Sep 24, 1930	Dreamland Park, Newark, New Jersey, U.S.	
120	Win	63–10 (47)	Vincent Forgione	KO	3 (10)	Aug 20, 1930	Dreamland Park, Newark, New Jersey, U.S.	
119	Win	62–10 (47)	Willie Oster	KO	3 (10)	Jul 30, 1930	Dreamland Park, Newark, New Jersey, U.S.	
118	Win	61–10 (47)	Charley Belanger	PTS	10	May 23, 1930	Olympia Stadium, Detroit, Michigan, U.S.	
117	Win	60–10 (47)	Paul Swiderski	NWS	10	May 16, 1930	Jefferson County Armory, Louisville, Kentucky, U.S.	
116	Win	60–10 (46)	K.O. White	KO	2 (10)	Mar 28, 1930	Coliseum, Davenport, Iowa, U.S.	
115	Win	59–10 (46)	Charley Arthurs	TKO	4 (10)	Mar 24, 1930	Flint, Michigan, U.S.	
114	Win	58–10 (46)	Jimmy Mahoney	KO	2 (10)	Mar 17, 1930	White City Arena, Chicago, Illinois, U.S.	
113	Win	57–10 (46)	Leo Lomski	PTS	10	Feb 14, 1930	Olympia Stadium, Detroit, Michigan, U.S.	
112	Win	56–10 (46)	Ace Hudkins	PTS	10	Oct 29, 1929	Wrigley Field, Los Angeles, California, U.S.	Retained NYSAC, NBA, and The Ring middleweight titles
111	Win	55–10 (46)	Leo Lomski	PTS	10	Aug 19, 1929	Municipal Stadium, Philadelphia, Pennsylvania, U.S.	
110	Loss	54–10 (46)	Tommy Loughran	SD	10	Mar 28, 1929	Chicago Stadium, Chicago, Illinois, U.S.	For NYSAC, NBA, and The Ring light-heavyweight titles
109	Win	54–9 (46)	Cowboy Jack Willis	PTS	10	Feb 22, 1929	Recreation Park, San Francisco, California, U.S.	
108	Win	53–9 (46)	Armand Emanuel	KO	7 (10)	Aug 27, 1928	Recreation Park, San Francisco, California, U.S.	
107	Win	52–9 (46)	Ace Hudkins	SD	10	Jun 21, 1928	Comiskey Park, Chicago, Illinois, U.S.	Retained NYSAC, NBA, and The Ring middleweight titles
106	Win	51–9 (46)	Jock Malone	NWS	10	Jun 5, 1928	Lexington Park, Saint Paul, Minnesota, U.S.	NYSAC, NBA, and The Ring middleweight titles at stake; (via KO only)
105	Win	51–9 (45)	Tony Marullo	PTS	10	May 28, 1928	Olympic Arena, New York City, New York, U.S.	
104	Win	50–9 (45)	George Smith	KO	4 (10)	May 21, 1928	Armory, Elizabeth, New Jersey, U.S.	
103	Win	49–9 (45)	Cowboy Jack Willis	PTS	10	Feb 22, 1928	State Armory, San Francisco, California, U.S.	
102	Win	48–9 (45)	Paul Berlenbach	PTS	10	Nov 25, 1927	Coliseum, Chicago, Illinois, U.S.	
101	Win	47–9 (45)	Mike McTigue	TKO	1 (10)	Nov 1, 1927	Coliseum, Chicago, Illinois, U.S.	
100	Win	46–9 (45)	Wilson Yarbo	UD	12	Aug 24, 1927	Taylor Bowl, Newburgh Heights, Ohio, U.S.	
99	Win	45–9 (45)	Tommy Milligan	KO	10 (20)	Jun 30, 1927	Olympia, Kensington, London, England	Retained NYSAC, NBA, and The Ring middleweight titles
98	Win	44–9 (45)	Mickey Wallace	TKO	3 (10)	Feb 1, 1927	Civic Auditorium, Fresno, California, U.S.	
97	Win	43–9 (45)	Tiger Flowers	PTS	10	Dec 3, 1926	Coliseum, Chicago, Illinois, U.S.	Won NYSAC, NBA, and The Ring middleweight titles
96	Win	42–9 (45)	Jock Malone	PTS	10	Nov 22, 1926	Mechanics Building, Boston, Massachusetts, U.S.	
95	Win	41–9 (45)	Joe Simonich	PTS	10	Nov 1, 1926	Arena, Philadelphia, Pennsylvania, U.S.	
94	Win	40–9 (45)	Shuffle Callahan	TKO	5 (10)	Oct 4, 1926	Dexter Park Pavilion, Chicago, Illinois, U.S.	
93	Loss	39–9 (45)	Joe Dundee	TKO	8 (10)	Jun 24, 1926	Madison Square Garden, New York City, New York, U.S.	
92	Loss	39–8 (45)	Pete Latzo	UD	10	May 20, 1926	Watres Armory, Scranton, Pennsylvania, U.S.	Lost NYSAC, NBA, and The Ring welterweight titles
91	Win	39–7 (45)	Sailor Friedman	NWS	12	Nov 25, 1925	Newark Armory, Newark, New Jersey, U.S.	NYSAC, NBA, and The Ring welterweight titles at stake; (via KO only)
90	Win	39–7 (44)	Dave Shade	SD	15	Sep 21, 1925	Yankee Stadium, Bronx, New York City, New York, U.S.	Retained NYSAC, NBA, and The Ring welterweight titles
89	Win	38–7 (44)	Sailor Friedman	NWS	10	Aug 24, 1925	East Chicago, Illinois, U.S.	
88	Loss	38–7 (43)	Harry Greb	UD	15	Jun 2, 1925	Polo Grounds, New York City, New York, U.S.	For NYSAC, NBA, and The Ring middleweight titles
87	Win	38–6 (43)	Lefty Cooper	KO	1 (10)	May 16, 1925	Ewing Field, San Francisco, California, U.S.	
86	Win	37–6 (43)	Bert Colima	DQ	7 (12)	Feb 24, 1925	Arena, Vernon, California, U.S.	
85	Win	36–6 (43)	Mike McTigue	NWS	12	Jan 7, 1925	1st Regiment Armory, Newark, New Jersey, U.S.	NYSAC, NBA, and The Ring light-heavyweight titles at stake; (via KO only)
84	Win	36–6 (42)	Jock Malone	NWS	10	Dec 8, 1924	Auditorium, Milwaukee, Wisconsin, U.S.	
83	Win	36–6 (41)	Jock Malone	NWS	12	Oct 29, 1924	113th Regiment Armory, Newark, New Jersey, U.S.	
82	Win	36–6 (40)	Bobby Barrett	KO	6 (10)	Oct 1, 1924	Shibe Park, Philadelphia, Pennsylvania, U.S.	Retained NYSAC, NBA, and The Ring welterweight titles
81	Win	35–6 (40)	Lew Tendler	UD	10	Jun 2, 1924	Shibe Park, Philadelphia, Pennsylvania, U.S.	Retained NYSAC, NBA, and The Ring welterweight titles
80	Win	34–6 (40)	Johnny Gill	UD	10	Apr 21, 1924	Arena, Philadelphia, Pennsylvania, U.S.	
79	Win	33–6 (40)	Mike Dempsey	TKO	5 (10)	Mar 10, 1924	Motor Square Garden, Pittsburgh, Pennsylvania, U.S.	
78	Win	32–6 (40)	Eddie Billings	TKO	5 (10)	Mar 3, 1924	Danceland Arena, Detroit, Michigan, U.S.	
77	Win	31–6 (40)	Wildcat Nelson	TKO	4 (12)	Feb 15, 1924	Naval Yard, Norfolk, Virginia, U.S.	
76	Win	30–6 (40)	Moe Herscovitch	KO	6 (10)	Dec 21, 1923	Coliseum, Toronto, Ontario, Canada	
75	NC	29–6 (40)	Jimmy Jones	NC	9 (12)	Oct 8, 1923	Dreamland Park, Newark, New Jersey, U.S.	NBA welterweight title at stake; Both men apparently "not trying"
74	Win	29–6 (39)	Bobby Green	TKO	8 (10)	Sep 20, 1923	Coliseum, Davenport, Iowa, U.S.	
73	Win	28–6 (39)	Nate Siegel	KO	10 (12)	Jul 16, 1923	Broad A.C., Newark, New Jersey, U.S.	
72	Win	27–6 (39)	Cowboy Padgett	TKO	11 (12)	Jul 2, 1923	Broad A.C., Newark, New Jersey, U.S.	
71	Win	26–6 (39)	Cowboy Padgett	NWS	10	May 16, 1923	Coliseum, Chicago, Illinois, U.S.	
70	Win	26–6 (38)	Morrie Schlaifer	KO	6 (10)	May 3, 1923	Dexter Park Pavilion, Chicago, Illinois, U.S.	
69	Win	25–6 (38)	Johnny Riley	KO	2 (10)	Apr 4, 1923	South Main Street Armory, Wilkes-Barre, Pennsylvania, U.S.	
68	Win	24–6 (38)	Pete Latzo	NWS	12	Mar 22, 1923	113th Regiment Armory, Newark, U.S.	NYSAC and NBA welterweight titles at stake; (via KO only)
67	Win	24–6 (37)	Charley Nashert	PTS	12	Mar 14, 1923	Broadway Auditorium, Buffalo, New York, U.S.	
66	Win	23–6 (37)	Johnny Gill	NWS	8	Mar 5, 1923	Arena, Philadelphia, Pennsylvania, U.S.	
65	Win	23–6 (36)	Johnny Griffiths	NWS	10	Feb 23, 1923	109th Infantry Armory, Scranton, Pennsylvania, U.S.	
64	Win	23–6 (35)	Steve Latzo	KO	3 (8)	Jan 15, 1923	Arena, Philadelphia, Pennsylvania, U.S.	
63	Win	22–6 (35)	Phil Krug	NWS	12	Dec 18, 1922	6th Regiment Armory, Newark, New Jersey, U.S.	
62	Win	22–6 (34)	Jack Britton	UD	15	Nov 1, 1922	Madison Square Garden, New York City, New York, U.S.	Won NYSAC and NBA welterweight titles
61	Win	21–6 (34)	Artie Bird	KO	8 (?)	Sep 14, 1922	New York City, New York, U.S.	
60	Loss	20–6 (34)	Wildcat Nelson	DQ	2 (8)	Aug 25, 1922	Ocean Park Casino, Long Branch, New Jersey, U.S.	
59	Loss	20–5 (34)	Jock Malone	PTS	10	Aug 2, 1922	Boston, Massachusetts, U.S.	
58	Loss	20–4 (34)	Georgie Ward	NWS	12	Jun 29, 1922	Broad A.C., Newark, New Jersey, U.S.	
57	Loss	20–4 (33)	Lou Bogash	PTS	12	Jun 26, 1922	Boston, Massachusetts, U.S.	
56	Win	20–3 (33)	Pal Reed	TKO	4 (10)	May 29, 1922	Boston, Massachusetts, U.S.	
55	NC	19–3 (33)	Harlem Eddie Kelly	NC	3 (10)	May 9, 1922	City Hall, Holyoke, Massachusetts, U.S.	
54	Loss	19–3 (32)	Jack Palmer	DQ	5 (8)	Mar 14, 1922	Ice Palace, Philadelphia, Pennsylvania, U.S.	
53	Win	19–2 (32)	Soldier Bartfield	NWS	12	Feb 23, 1922	Broad A.C., Newark, New Jersey, U.S.	
52	Win	19–2 (31)	Johnny Griffiths	TKO	9 (10)	Feb 10, 1922	Mechanics Building, Boston, Massachusetts, U.S.	
51	Win	18–2 (31)	Soldier Bartfield	NWS	8	Jan 31, 1922	Ice Palace, Philadelphia, Pennsylvania, U.S.	
50	Win	18–2 (30)	Georgie Ward	NWS	12	Jan 23, 1922	1st Regiment Armory, Newark, New Jersey, U.S.	
49	Win	18–2 (29)	Soldier Bartfield	NWS	8	Jan 10, 1922	Ice Palace, Philadelphia, Pennsylvania, U.S.	
48	Win	18–2 (28)	Johnny Griffiths	NWS	12	Jan 9, 1922	4th Regiment Armory, Jersey City, New Jersey, U.S.	
47	Win	18–2 (27)	Nate Siegel	PTS	10	Dec 30, 1921	Mechanics Building, Boston, Massachusetts, U.S.	
46	Loss	17–2 (27)	Dave Shade	NWS	12	Dec 21, 1921	Broad A.C., Newark, New Jersey, U.S.	
45	Win	17–2 (26)	Dave Shade	TKO	8 (12)	Nov 21, 1921	Broad A.C., Newark, New Jersey, U.S.	
44	Win	16–2 (26)	Wildcat Nelson	NWS	12	Aug 25, 1921	Coliseum, Newark, New Jersey, U.S.	
43	Win	16–2 (25)	Shamus O'Brien	NWS	12	Aug 19, 1921	Ocean Park Casino, Long Branch, New Jersey, U.S.	
42	Draw	16–2 (24)	Jack Britton	NWS	12	Jul 18, 1921	Armory, Newark, New Jersey, U.S.	
41	Win	16–2 (23)	Johnny Summers	NWS	10	May 26, 1921	Coliseum, Newark, New Jersey, U.S.	
40	Win	16–2 (22)	Marcel Thomas	KO	4 (12)	May 3, 1921	Coliseum, Newark, New Jersey, U.S.	
39	Win	15–2 (22)	Kid Green	PTS	12	Apr 20, 1921	Marieville Gardens, North Providence, Rhode Island, U.S.	
38	Win	14–2 (22)	Terry Brooks	NWS	12	Apr 12, 1921	Coliseum, Newark, New Jersey, U.S.	
37	Win	14–2 (21)	Joe Stefanik	KO	3 (12)	Apr 6, 1921	Marieville Gardens, North Providence, Rhode Island, U.S.	
36	Win	13–2 (21)	Marty Summers	NWS	12	Mar 29, 1921	Coliseum, Newark, New Jersey, U.S.	
35	Loss	13–2 (20)	Charley Pitts	NWS	12	Mar 8, 1921	Coliseum, Newark, New Jersey, U.S.	
34	Win	13–2 (19)	Harlem Eddie Kelly	KO	5 (12)	Feb 23, 1921	Coliseum, Newark, New Jersey, U.S.	
33	Win	12–2 (19)	Marcel Thomas	NWS	12	Feb 1, 1921	Coliseum, Newark, New Jersey, U.S.	
32	Win	12–2 (18)	Charley Beck	KO	2 (12)	Jan 5, 1921	Elizabeth, New Jersey, U.S.	
31	Win	11–2 (18)	Jimmy Sullivan	NWS	12	Nov 26, 1920	2nd Regiment Armory, Elizabeth, New Jersey, U.S.	
30	Win	11–2 (17)	Mickey Donley	NWS	12	Nov 12, 1920	Elizabeth, New Jersey, U.S.	
29	Loss	11–2 (16)	Shamus O'Brien	NWS	12	Oct 25, 1920	Union Square A.C., Elizabeth, New Jersey, U.S.	
28	Draw	11–2 (15)	Jimmy Sullivan	NWS	12	Oct 8, 1920	Elizabeth, New Jersey, U.S.	
27	Win	11–2 (14)	Banty Lewis	KO	8 (12)	Sep 21, 1920	Coliseum, Newark, New Jersey, U.S.	
26	Loss	10–2 (14)	Shamus O'Brien	NWS	12	Sep 14, 1920	Coliseum, Newark, New Jersey, U.S.	
25	Win	10–2 (13)	Tommy Speno	NWS	12	May 18, 1920	Coliseum, Newark, New Jersey, U.S.	
24	Loss	10–2 (12)	Willie Gradwell	NWS	8	Apr 30, 1920	Elizabeth, New Jersey, U.S.	
23	Win	10–2 (11)	Willie Condon	KO	3 (8)	Apr 16, 1920	Elizabeth, New Jersey, U.S.	
22	Win	9–2 (11)	Joe Gannon	NWS	8	Feb 20, 1920	Elizabeth, New Jersey, U.S.	
21	Win	9–2 (10)	Benny Cohen	NWS	8	Jan 20, 1920	Coliseum, Newark, New Jersey, U.S.	
20	Win	9–2 (9)	Tommy Speno	NWS	8	Jan 2, 1920	Foresters A.C., Elizabeth, New Jersey, U.S.	
19	Win	9–2 (8)	Young Thompson	TKO	5 (8)	Dec 19, 1919	McGuigan's Arena, Harrison, New Jersey, U.S.	
18	Loss	8–2 (8)	Johnny Smith	KO	2 (6)	Dec 19, 1919	Cambria A.C., Philadelphia, Pennsylvania, U.S.	
17	Win	8–1 (8)	Jimmy Vallon	TKO	6 (8)	Dec 12, 1919	Elizabeth, New Jersey, U.S.	
16	Win	7–1 (8)	Harold Anthony	NWS	8	Nov 13, 1919	Elizabeth, New Jersey, U.S.	
15	Win	7–1 (7)	Young Dempsey	TKO	7 (8)	Oct 24, 1919	Elizabeth, New Jersey, U.S.	
14	Win	6–1 (7)	Willie Herman	NWS	6	Oct 3, 1919	Elizabeth, New Jersey, U.S.	
13	Win	6–1 (6)	Mickey Sullivan	KO	1 (6)	Sep 12, 1919	Elizabeth, New Jersey, U.S.	
12	Win	5–1 (6)	George Adams	NWS	6	Jun 13, 1919	Elizabeth, New Jersey, U.S.	
11	Win	5–1 (5)	Dominic Orsini	KO	5 (6)	May 31, 1919	Elizabeth, New Jersey, U.S.	
10	Win	4–1 (5)	Young Frenchy	KO	3 (6)	May 16, 1919	Elizabeth, New Jersey, U.S.	
9	Win	3–1 (5)	Kid Dempsey	NWS	6	May 7, 1919	Elizabeth, New Jersey, U.S.	
8	Loss	3–1 (4)	Phil Delmont	TKO	1 (6)	Apr 29, 1919	Elizabeth, New Jersey, U.S.	
7	Win	3–0 (4)	Charley Hance	NWS	6	Apr 21, 1919	Elizabeth, New Jersey, U.S.	
6	Win	3–0 (3)	Johnny Saas	KO	1 (6)	Apr 14, 1919	Elizabeth, New Jersey, U.S.	
5	Win	2–0 (3)	Eddie Summers	NWS	6	Apr 7, 1919	Elizabeth, New Jersey, U.S.	
4	Win	2–0 (2)	Young Frenchy	NWS	6	Mar 17, 1919	Elizabeth, New Jersey, U.S.	
3	Win	2–0 (1)	Sailor Kirch	KO	1 (4)	Mar 3, 1919	Elizabeth, New Jersey, U.S.	
2	Win	1–0 (1)	Jimmy McCrann	KO	2 (4)	Feb 24, 1919	Elizabeth, New Jersey, U.S.	
1	Win	0–0 (1)	Dominic Orsini	NWS	4	Feb 10, 1919	Foresters A.C., Elizabeth, New Jersey, U.S.	

=== Unofficial record ===
164 fights	131 wins	25 losses
By knockout	60	6
By decision	70	17
By disqualification	1	2
Draws	6	
No contests	2	

Record with the inclusion of newspaper decisions in the win/loss/draw column.

No.	Result	Record	Opponent	Type	Round	Date	Location	Notes
164	Loss	131–25–6 (2)	Erich Seelig	TKO	7 (10)	Dec 2, 1935	St. Nicholas Arena, New York City, New York, U.S.	
163	Win	131–24–6 (2)	Mickey McAvoy	KO	2 (8)	Oct 25, 1935	Kalurah Temple, Binghamton, Alabama, U.S.	
162	Win	130–24–6 (2)	Eddie Whalen	TKO	3 (10)	Sep 26, 1935	Odd Fellows' Hall, Albany, New York, U.S.	
161	Win	129–24–6 (2)	Charley Weise	PTS	6	Sep 20, 1935	Luna Park Arena, New York City, New York, U.S.	
160	Win	128–24–6 (2)	Joe Gorman	PTS	8	Sep 12, 1935	Fort Hamilton Arena, New York City, New York, U.S.	
159	Win	127–24–6 (2)	Thys Menger	KO	2 (8)	Aug 29, 1935	Fort Hamilton Arena, New York City, New York, U.S.	
158	Win	126–24–6 (2)	Lou Poster	KO	2 (10)	Aug 12, 1935	Arena Stadium, Philadelphia, Pennsylvania, U.S.	
157	Loss	125–24–6 (2)	John Andersson	PTS	6	Jul 29, 1935	Dexter Park Arena, Woodhaven, New York City, New York, U.S.	
156	Loss	125–23–6 (2)	Paul Pirrone	KO	11 (12)	Dec 3, 1934	Convention Hall, Philadelphia, Pennsylvania, U.S.	
155	Win	125–22–6 (2)	Tait Littman	PTS	10	Nov 26, 1934	Duquesne Gardens, Pittsburgh, Pennsylvania, U.S.	
154	Loss	124–22–6 (2)	Paul Pirrone	MD	10	Nov 12, 1934	Arena, Philadelphia, Pennsylvania, U.S.	
153	Draw	124–21–6 (2)	Natie Brown	PTS	10	Oct 24, 1934	Auditorium, Washington, D.C., U.S.	
152	Loss	124–21–5 (2)	Young Corbett III	PTS	10	Aug 14, 1934	Seals Stadium, San Francisco, U.S.	
151	Win	124–20–5 (2)	Maxie Rosenbloom	PTS	10	May 8, 1934	Olympic Auditorium, Los Angeles, U.S.	
150	Draw	123–20–5 (2)	Bob Godwin	PTS	10	Apr 13, 1934	Civic Auditorium, San Francisco, California, U.S.	
149	Win	123–20–4 (2)	Maxie Maxwell	TKO	5 (10)	Apr 6, 1934	Coliseum, San Diego, California, U.S.	
148	Win	122–20–4 (2)	Tom Patrick	PTS	10	Mar 29, 1934	Legion Stadium, Hollywood, California, U.S.	
147	Draw	121–20–4 (2)	Bob Godwin	PTS	10	Jan 29, 1934	Dixie Theatre, West Palm Beach, Florida, U.S.	
146	Win	121–20–3 (2)	Les Kennedy	KO	2 (10)	Dec 4, 1933	Laurel Garden, Newark, New Jersey, U.S.	
145	Loss	120–20–3 (2)	Maxie Rosenbloom	UD	15	Nov 3, 1933	Madison Square Garden, New York City, New York, U.S.	For NYSAC, NBA, and The Ring light-heavyweight titles
144	Loss	120–19–3 (2)	Lou Brouillard	PTS	10	Jul 6, 1933	Boston Garden, Boston, Massachusetts, U.S.	
143	Win	120–18–3 (2)	George Manley	PTS	10	Apr 24, 1933	Civic Auditorium, San Francisco, California, U.S.	
142	Win	119–18–3 (2)	Arthur De Kuh	KO	1 (10)	Dec 6, 1932	Olympic Auditorium, Los Angeles, California, U.S.	
141	Loss	118–18–3 (2)	Max Schmeling	TKO	8 (15)	Sep 26, 1932	Madison Square Garden Bowl, Long Island City, New York City, New York, U.S.	
140	Win	118–17–3 (2)	Salvatore Ruggirello	KO	1 (10)	Jul 25, 1932	Dreamland Park, Newark, New Jersey, U.S.	
139	Loss	117–17–3 (2)	Johnny Risko	UD	12	Jun 24, 1932	Municipal Stadium, Cleveland, Ohio, U.S.	
138	Win	117–16–3 (2)	Paulino Uzcudun	PTS	10	May 26, 1932	Madison Square Garden, New York City, New York, U.S.	
137	Win	116–16–3 (2)	King Levinsky	SD	10	Apr 29, 1932	Chicago Stadium, Chicago, Illinois, U.S.	
136	Win	115–16–3 (2)	Jimmy Mahoney	TKO	2 (10)	Mar 11, 1932	McCullough's Arena, Salt Lake City, Utah, U.S.	
135	Win	114–16–3 (2)	Jackie Williams	KO	2 (10)	Mar 8, 1932	City Auditorium, Denver, Colorado, U.S.	
134	Win	113–16–3 (2)	Jack Gagnon	KO	1 (10)	Aug 17, 1931	Bison Stadium, Buffalo, New York, U.S.	
133	Draw	112–16–3 (2)	Jack Sharkey	PTS	15	Jul 22, 1931	Ebbets Field, New York City, New York, U.S.	
132	Win	112–16–2 (2)	Bearcat Wright	PTS	10	Apr 10, 1931	Auditorium, Omaha, Nebraska, U.S.	
131	Win	111–16–2 (2)	Johnny Risko	UD	10	Feb 25, 1931	Madison Square Garden Stadium, Miami, Florida, U.S.	
130	Win	110–16–2 (2)	Joe Lohman	TKO	6 (10)	Jan 23, 1931	Armory, Grand Rapids, Michigan, U.S.	
129	Win	109–16–2 (2)	Herman Weiner	KO	1 (10)	Jan 19, 1931	104th Regiment Armory, Baltimore, Maryland, U.S.	
128	Win	108–16–2 (2)	Matt Adgie	TKO	1 (10)	Jan 12, 1931	Arena, Philadelphia, Pennsylvania, U.S.	
127	Win	107–16–2 (2)	KO Christner	KO	1 (10)	Nov 28, 1930	Coliseum, Chicago, Illinois, U.S.	
126	Win	106–16–2 (2)	Johnny Risko	PTS	10	Nov 7, 1930	Olympia Stadium, Detroit, Michigan, U.S.	
125	Win	105–16–2 (2)	Homer Sheridan	KO	1 (10)	Oct 22, 1930	Forum, Wichita, Kansas, U.S.	
124	Win	104–16–2 (2)	Tiger Johnny Cline	KO	2 (10)	Oct 17, 1930	Gayety Theater, Saint Louis, Missouri, U.S.	
123	Win	103–16–2 (2)	Mike Mandell	TKO	1 (10)	Oct 13, 1930	Coliseum, Des Moines, Iowa, U.S.	
122	Win	102–16–2 (2)	Del Fontaine	KO	4 (10)	Oct 3, 1930	Auditorium, Saint Paul, Minnesota, U.S.	
121	Win	101–16–2 (2)	Paul Swiderski	KO	3 (10)	Sep 24, 1930	Dreamland Park, Newark, New Jersey, U.S.	
120	Win	100–16–2 (2)	Vincent Forgione	KO	3 (10)	Aug 20, 1930	Dreamland Park, Newark, New Jersey, U.S.	
119	Win	99–16–2 (2)	Willie Oster	KO	3 (10)	Jul 30, 1930	Dreamland Park, Newark, New Jersey, U.S.	
118	Win	98–16–2 (2)	Charley Belanger	PTS	10	May 23, 1930	Olympia Stadium, Detroit, Michigan, U.S.	
117	Win	97–16–2 (2)	Paul Swiderski	NWS	10	May 16, 1930	Jefferson County Armory, Louisville, Kentucky, U.S.	
116	Win	96–16–2 (2)	K.O. White	KO	2 (10)	Mar 28, 1930	Coliseum, Davenport, Iowa, U.S.	
115	Win	95–16–2 (2)	Charley Arthurs	TKO	4 (10)	Mar 24, 1930	Flint, Michigan, U.S.	
114	Win	94–16–2 (2)	Jimmy Mahoney	KO	2 (10)	Mar 17, 1930	White City Arena, Chicago, Illinois, U.S.	
113	Win	93–16–2 (2)	Leo Lomski	PTS	10	Feb 14, 1930	Olympia Stadium, Detroit, Michigan, U.S.	
112	Win	92–16–2 (2)	Ace Hudkins	PTS	10	Oct 29, 1929	Wrigley Field, Los Angeles, California, U.S.	Retained NYSAC, NBA, and The Ring middleweight titles
111	Win	91–16–2 (2)	Leo Lomski	PTS	10	Aug 19, 1929	Municipal Stadium, Philadelphia, Pennsylvania, U.S.	
110	Loss	90–16–2 (2)	Tommy Loughran	SD	10	Mar 28, 1929	Chicago Stadium, Chicago, Illinois, U.S.	For NYSAC, NBA, and The Ring light-heavyweight titles
109	Win	90–15–2 (2)	Cowboy Jack Willis	PTS	10	Feb 22, 1929	Recreation Park, San Francisco, California, U.S.	
108	Win	89–15–2 (2)	Armand Emanuel	KO	7 (10)	Aug 27, 1928	Recreation Park, San Francisco, California, U.S.	
107	Win	88–15–2 (2)	Ace Hudkins	SD	10	Jun 21, 1928	Comiskey Park, Chicago, Illinois, U.S.	Retained NYSAC, NBA, and The Ring middleweight titles
106	Win	87–15–2 (2)	Jock Malone	NWS	10	Jun 5, 1928	Lexington Park, Saint Paul, Minnesota, U.S.	NYSAC, NBA, and The Ring middleweight titles at stake; (via KO only)
105	Win	86–15–2 (2)	Tony Marullo	PTS	10	May 28, 1928	Olympic Arena, New York City, New York, U.S.	
104	Win	85–15–2 (2)	George Smith	KO	4 (10)	May 21, 1928	Armory, Elizabeth, New Jersey, U.S.	
103	Win	84–15–2 (2)	Cowboy Jack Willis	PTS	10	Feb 22, 1928	State Armory, San Francisco, California, U.S.	
102	Win	83–15–2 (2)	Paul Berlenbach	PTS	10	Nov 25, 1927	Coliseum, Chicago, Illinois, U.S.	
101	Win	82–15–2 (2)	Mike McTigue	TKO	1 (10)	Nov 1, 1927	Coliseum, Chicago, Illinois, U.S.	
100	Win	81–15–2 (2)	Wilson Yarbo	UD	12	Aug 24, 1927	Taylor Bowl, Newburgh Heights, Ohio, U.S.	
99	Win	80–15–2 (2)	Tommy Milligan	KO	10 (20)	Jun 30, 1927	Olympia, Kensington, London, England	Retained NYSAC, NBA, and The Ring middleweight titles
98	Win	79–15–2 (2)	Mickey Wallace	TKO	3 (10)	Feb 1, 1927	Civic Auditorium, Fresno, California, U.S.	
97	Win	78–15–2 (2)	Tiger Flowers	PTS	10	Dec 3, 1926	Coliseum, Chicago, Illinois, U.S.	Won NYSAC, NBA, and The Ring middleweight titles
96	Win	77–15–2 (2)	Jock Malone	PTS	10	Nov 22, 1926	Mechanics Building, Boston, Massachusetts, U.S.	
95	Win	76–15–2 (2)	Joe Simonich	PTS	10	Nov 1, 1926	Arena, Philadelphia, Pennsylvania, U.S.	
94	Win	75–15–2 (2)	Shuffle Callahan	TKO	5 (10)	Oct 4, 1926	Dexter Park Pavilion, Chicago, Illinois, U.S.	
93	Loss	74–15–2 (2)	Joe Dundee	TKO	8 (10)	Jun 24, 1926	Madison Square Garden, New York City, New York, U.S.	
92	Loss	74–14–2 (2)	Pete Latzo	UD	10	May 20, 1926	Watres Armory, Scranton, Pennsylvania, U.S.	Lost NYSAC, NBA, and The Ring welterweight titles
91	Win	74–13–2 (2)	Sailor Friedman	NWS	12	Nov 25, 1925	Newark Armory, Newark, New Jersey, U.S.	NYSAC, NBA, and The Ring welterweight titles at stake; (via KO only)
90	Win	73–13–2 (2)	Dave Shade	SD	15	Sep 21, 1925	Yankee Stadium, Bronx, New York City, New York, U.S.	Retained NYSAC, NBA, and The Ring welterweight titles
89	Win	72–13–2 (2)	Sailor Friedman	NWS	10	Aug 24, 1925	East Chicago, Illinois, U.S.	
88	Loss	71–13–2 (2)	Harry Greb	UD	15	Jun 2, 1925	Polo Grounds, New York City, New York, U.S.	For NYSAC, NBA, and The Ring middleweight titles
87	Win	71–12–2 (2)	Lefty Cooper	KO	1 (10)	May 16, 1925	Ewing Field, San Francisco, California, U.S.	
86	Win	70–12–2 (2)	Bert Colima	DQ	7 (12)	Feb 24, 1925	Arena, Vernon, California, U.S.	
85	Win	69–12–2 (2)	Mike McTigue	NWS	12	Jan 7, 1925	1st Regiment Armory, Newark, New Jersey, U.S.	NYSAC, NBA, and The Ring light-heavyweight titles at stake; (via KO only)
84	Win	68–12–2 (2)	Jock Malone	NWS	10	Dec 8, 1924	Auditorium, Milwaukee, Wisconsin, U.S.	
83	Win	67–12–2 (2)	Jock Malone	NWS	12	Oct 29, 1924	113th Regiment Armory, Newark, New Jersey, U.S.	
82	Win	66–12–2 (2)	Bobby Barrett	KO	6 (10)	Oct 1, 1924	Shibe Park, Philadelphia, Pennsylvania, U.S.	Retained NYSAC, NBA, and The Ring welterweight titles
81	Win	65–12–2 (2)	Lew Tendler	UD	10	Jun 2, 1924	Shibe Park, Philadelphia, Pennsylvania, U.S.	Retained NYSAC, NBA, and The Ring welterweight titles
80	Win	64–12–2 (2)	Johnny Gill	UD	10	Apr 21, 1924	Arena, Philadelphia, Pennsylvania, U.S.	
79	Win	63–12–2 (2)	Mike Dempsey	TKO	5 (10)	Mar 10, 1924	Motor Square Garden, Pittsburgh, Pennsylvania, U.S.	
78	Win	62–12–2 (2)	Eddie Billings	TKO	5 (10)	Mar 3, 1924	Danceland Arena, Detroit, Michigan, U.S.	
77	Win	61–12–2 (2)	Wildcat Nelson	TKO	4 (12)	Feb 15, 1924	Naval Yard, Norfolk, Virginia, U.S.	
76	Win	60–12–2 (2)	Moe Herscovitch	KO	6 (10)	Dec 21, 1923	Coliseum, Toronto, Ontario, Canada	
75	NC	59–12–2 (2)	Jimmy Jones	NC	9 (12)	Oct 8, 1923	Dreamland Park, Newark, New Jersey, U.S.	NBA welterweight title at stake; Both men apparently "not trying"
74	Win	59–12–2 (1)	Bobby Green	TKO	8 (10)	Sep 20, 1923	Coliseum, Davenport, Iowa, U.S.	
73	Win	58–12–2 (1)	Nate Siegel	KO	10 (12)	Jul 16, 1923	Broad A.C., Newark, New Jersey, U.S.	
72	Win	57–12–2 (1)	Cowboy Padgett	TKO	11 (12)	Jul 2, 1923	Broad A.C., Newark, New Jersey, U.S.	
71	Win	56–12–2 (1)	Cowboy Padgett	NWS	10	May 16, 1923	Coliseum, Chicago, Illinois, U.S.	
70	Win	55–12–2 (1)	Morrie Schlaifer	KO	6 (10)	May 3, 1923	Dexter Park Pavilion, Chicago, Illinois, U.S.	
69	Win	54–12–2 (1)	Johnny Riley	KO	2 (10)	Apr 4, 1923	South Main Street Armory, Wilkes-Barre, Pennsylvania, U.S.	
68	Win	53–12–2 (1)	Pete Latzo	NWS	12	Mar 22, 1923	113th Regiment Armory, Newark, U.S.	NYSAC, NBA welterweight titles at stake; (via KO only)
67	Win	52–12–2 (1)	Charley Nashert	PTS	12	Mar 14, 1923	Broadway Auditorium, Buffalo, New York, U.S.	
66	Win	51–12–2 (1)	Johnny Gill	NWS	8	Mar 5, 1923	Arena, Philadelphia, Pennsylvania, U.S.	
65	Win	50–12–2 (1)	Johnny Griffiths	NWS	10	Feb 23, 1923	109th Infantry Armory, Scranton, Pennsylvania, U.S.	
64	Win	49–12–2 (1)	Steve Latzo	KO	3 (8)	Jan 15, 1923	Arena, Philadelphia, Pennsylvania, U.S.	
63	Win	48–12–2 (1)	Phil Krug	NWS	12	Dec 18, 1922	6th Regiment Armory, Newark, New Jersey, U.S.	
62	Win	47–12–2 (1)	Jack Britton	UD	15	Nov 1, 1922	Madison Square Garden, New York City, New York, U.S.	Won NYSAC and NBA welterweight titles
61	Win	46–12–2 (1)	Artie Bird	KO	8 (?)	Sep 14, 1922	New York City, New York, U.S.	
60	Loss	45–12–2 (1)	Wildcat Nelson	DQ	2 (8)	Aug 25, 1922	Ocean Park Casino, Long Branch, New Jersey, U.S.	
59	Loss	45–11–2 (1)	Jock Malone	PTS	10	Aug 2, 1922	Boston, Massachusetts, U.S.	
58	Loss	45–10–2 (1)	Georgie Ward	NWS	12	Jun 29, 1922	Broad A.C., Newark, New Jersey, U.S.	
57	Loss	45–9–2 (1)	Lou Bogash	PTS	12	Jun 26, 1922	Boston, Massachusetts, U.S.	
56	Win	45–8–2 (1)	Pal Reed	TKO	4 (10)	May 29, 1922	Boston, Massachusetts, U.S.	
55	NC	44–8–2 (1)	Harlem Eddie Kelly	NC	3 (10)	May 9, 1922	City Hall, Holyoke, Massachusetts, U.S.	
54	Loss	44–8–2	Jack Palmer	DQ	5 (8)	Mar 14, 1922	Ice Palace, Philadelphia, Pennsylvania, U.S.	
53	Win	44–7–2	Soldier Bartfield	NWS	12	Feb 23, 1922	Broad A.C., Newark, New Jersey, U.S.	
52	Win	43–7–2	Johnny Griffiths	TKO	9 (10)	Feb 10, 1922	Mechanics Building, Boston, Massachusetts, U.S.	
51	Win	42–7–2	Soldier Bartfield	NWS	8	Jan 31, 1922	Ice Palace, Philadelphia, Pennsylvania, U.S.	
50	Win	41–7–2	Georgie Ward	NWS	12	Jan 23, 1922	1st Regiment Armory, Newark, New Jersey, U.S.	
49	Win	40–7–2	Soldier Bartfield	NWS	8	Jan 10, 1922	Ice Palace, Philadelphia, Pennsylvania, U.S.	
48	Win	39–7–2	Johnny Griffiths	NWS	12	Jan 9, 1922	4th Regiment Armory, Jersey City, New Jersey, U.S.	
47	Win	38–7–2	Nate Siegel	PTS	10	Dec 30, 1921	Mechanics Building, Boston, Massachusetts, U.S.	
46	Loss	37–7–2	Dave Shade	NWS	12	Dec 21, 1921	Broad A.C., Newark, New Jersey, U.S.	
45	Win	37–6–2	Dave Shade	TKO	8 (12)	Nov 21, 1921	Broad A.C., Newark, New Jersey, U.S.	
44	Win	36–6–2	Wildcat Nelson	NWS	12	Aug 25, 1921	Coliseum, Newark, New Jersey, U.S.	
43	Win	35–6–2	Shamus O'Brien	NWS	12	Aug 19, 1921	Ocean Park Casino, Long Branch, New Jersey, U.S.	
42	Draw	34–6–2	Jack Britton	NWS	12	Jul 18, 1921	Armory, Newark, New Jersey, U.S.	
41	Win	34–6–1	Johnny Summers	NWS	10	May 26, 1921	Coliseum, Newark, New Jersey, U.S.	
40	Win	33–6–1	Marcel Thomas	KO	4 (12)	May 3, 1921	Coliseum, Newark, New Jersey, U.S.	
39	Win	32–6–1	Kid Green	PTS	12	Apr 20, 1921	Marieville Gardens, North Providence, Rhode Island, U.S.	
38	Win	31–6–1	Terry Brooks	NWS	12	Apr 12, 1921	Coliseum, Newark, New Jersey, U.S.	
37	Win	30–6–1	Joe Stefanik	KO	3 (12)	Apr 6, 1921	Marieville Gardens, North Providence, Rhode Island, U.S.	
36	Win	29–6–1	Marty Summers	NWS	12	Mar 29, 1921	Coliseum, Newark, New Jersey, U.S.	
35	Loss	28–6–1	Charley Pitts	NWS	12	Mar 8, 1921	Coliseum, Newark, New Jersey, U.S.	
34	Win	28–5–1	Harlem Eddie Kelly	KO	5 (12)	Feb 23, 1921	Coliseum, Newark, New Jersey, U.S.	
33	Win	27–5–1	Marcel Thomas	NWS	12	Feb 1, 1921	Coliseum, Newark, New Jersey, U.S.	
32	Win	26–5–1	Charley Beck	KO	2 (12)	Jan 5, 1921	Elizabeth, New Jersey, U.S.	
31	Win	25–5–1	Jimmy Sullivan	NWS	12	Nov 26, 1920	2nd Regiment Armory, Elizabeth, New Jersey, U.S.	
30	Win	24–5–1	Mickey Donley	NWS	12	Nov 12, 1920	Elizabeth, New Jersey, U.S.	
29	Loss	23–5–1	Shamus O'Brien	NWS	12	Oct 25, 1920	Union Square A.C., Elizabeth, New Jersey, U.S.	
28	Draw	23–4–1	Jimmy Sullivan	NWS	12	Oct 8, 1920	Elizabeth, New Jersey, U.S.	
27	Win	23–4	Banty Lewis	KO	8 (12)	Sep 21, 1920	Coliseum, Newark, New Jersey, U.S.	
26	Loss	22–4	Shamus O'Brien	NWS	12	Sep 14, 1920	Coliseum, Newark, New Jersey, U.S.	
25	Win	22–3	Tommy Speno	NWS	12	May 18, 1920	Coliseum, Newark, New Jersey, U.S.	
24	Loss	21–3	Willie Gradwell	NWS	8	Apr 30, 1920	Elizabeth, New Jersey, U.S.	
23	Win	21–2	Willie Condon	KO	3 (8)	Apr 16, 1920	Elizabeth, New Jersey, U.S.	
22	Win	20–2	Joe Gannon	NWS	8	Feb 20, 1920	Elizabeth, New Jersey, U.S.	
21	Win	19–2	Benny Cohen	NWS	8	Jan 20, 1920	Coliseum, Newark, New Jersey, U.S.	
20	Win	18–2	Tommy Speno	NWS	8	Jan 2, 1920	Foresters A.C., Elizabeth, New Jersey, U.S.	
19	Win	17–2	Young Thompson	TKO	5 (8)	Dec 19, 1919	McGuigan's Arena, Harrison, New Jersey, U.S.	
18	Loss	16–2	Johnny Smith	KO	2 (6)	Dec 19, 1919	Cambria A.C., Philadelphia, Pennsylvania, U.S.	
17	Win	16–1	Jimmy Vallon	TKO	6 (8)	Dec 12, 1919	Elizabeth, New Jersey, U.S.	
16	Win	15–1	Harold Anthony	NWS	8	Nov 13, 1919	Elizabeth, New Jersey, U.S.	
15	Win	14–1	Young Dempsey	TKO	7 (8)	Oct 24, 1919	Elizabeth, New Jersey, U.S.	
14	Win	13–1	Willie Herman	NWS	6	Oct 3, 1919	Elizabeth, New Jersey, U.S.	
13	Win	12–1	Mickey Sullivan	KO	1 (6)	Sep 12, 1919	Elizabeth, New Jersey, U.S.	
12	Win	11–1	George Adams	NWS	6	Jun 13, 1919	Elizabeth, New Jersey, U.S.	
11	Win	10–1	Dominic Orsini	KO	5 (6)	May 31, 1919	Elizabeth, New Jersey, U.S.	
10	Win	9–1	Young Frenchy	KO	3 (6)	May 16, 1919	Elizabeth, New Jersey, U.S.	
9	Win	8–1	Kid Dempsey	NWS	6	May 7, 1919	Elizabeth, New Jersey, U.S.	
8	Loss	7–1	Phil Delmont	TKO	1 (6)	Apr 29, 1919	Elizabeth, New Jersey, U.S.	
7	Win	7–0	Charley Hance	NWS	6	Apr 21, 1919	Elizabeth, New Jersey, U.S.	
6	Win	6–0	Johnny Saas	KO	1 (6)	Apr 14, 1919	Elizabeth, New Jersey, U.S.	
5	Win	5–0	Eddie Summers	NWS	6	Apr 7, 1919	Elizabeth, New Jersey, U.S.	
4	Win	4–0	Young Frenchy	NWS	6	Mar 17, 1919	Elizabeth, New Jersey, U.S.	
3	Win	3–0	Sailor Kirch	KO	1 (4)	Mar 3, 1919	Elizabeth, New Jersey, U.S.	
2	Win	2–0	Jimmy McCrann	KO	2 (4)	Feb 24, 1919	Elizabeth, New Jersey, U.S.	
1	Win	1–0	Dominic Orsini	NWS	4	Feb 10, 1919	Foresters A.C., Elizabeth, New Jersey, U.S.	

== Titles in boxing ==
=== Major world titles ===
- NYSAC welterweight champion (147 lbs) (2×) (Note: Stripped of the NYSAC title on June 6, 1923 and reinstated in November 1923.)
- NBA (WBA) welterweight champion (147 lbs)
- NYSAC middleweight champion (160 lbs)
- NBA (WBA) middleweight champion (160 lbs)

=== The Ring magazine titles ===
- The Ring welterweight champion (147 lbs)
- The Ring middleweight champion (160 lbs)

=== Undisputed titles ===
- Undisputed welterweight champion (2×)
- Undisputed middleweight champion

== See also ==
- List of welterweight boxing champions
- List of middleweight boxing champions

== Notes and references ==
=== References ===
Achievements
Preceded by Jack Britton	World Welterweight Champion; November 1, 1922 – May 20, 1926	Succeeded by Pete Latzo
Preceded by Tiger Flowers	World Middleweight Champion; December 3, 1926 – October 29, 1929; Vacated	Vacant Title next held by Tony Zale
