= Charley Belanger =

Canadian boxer (1901–1970)

Personal information
- Nationality: Canadian
- Born: January 1, 1901 Winnipeg, Manitoba, Canada
- Died: January 20, 1970 (aged 68)
- Weight: Light Heavyweight

Boxing career
- Stance: Orthodox

Boxing record
- Total fights: 198
- Wins: 111
- Win by KO: 37
- Losses: 62
- Draws: 25

Charley Belanger (January 1, 1901 – January 20, 1970) was a Canadian boxer.

== Amateur career ==
Born in Winnipeg, Belanger competed in the 1924 Summer Olympics. During those games he was eliminated in the second round of the light heavyweight class after losing his bout to George Mulholland. He was also the 1925 Pan American Games light heavyweight Champion.

== Professional career ==
Belanger became a professional boxer in 1925 and faced some of the notable light heavyweights of his era. In 1928 he won the Canadian light heavyweight title. Later that year he also picked up the British Empire light heavyweight title by defeating Ted "Kid" Lewis.

He lost three times to Maxie Rosenbloom—who was a light heavyweight champion—but none of those bouts were for a title. He also lost to former middleweight world champion Mickey Walker, split a pair of bouts with former welterweight champion Pete Latzo and future heavyweight title contender Tommy Farr, and defeated former light heavyweight champion Jimmy Slattery. Belanger never won a world title.

Belanger was inducted into the Manitoba Sports Hall of Fame in 2009.
