= Bob Godwin =

American boxer

Personal information
- Nationality: American
- Born: Robert Godwin; May 5, 1911 Moultrie, Georgia
- Died: August 1, 1980 (aged 69) Daytona Beach, Florida
- Height: 5 ft 11.5 in (1.82 m)
- Weight: Light Heavyweight

Boxing career
- Reach: 6 ft 1.5 in (1.87 m)
- Stance: Orthodox

Boxing record
- Total fights: 136
- Wins: 95
- Win by KO: 31
- Losses: 24
- Draws: 15
- No contests: 2

Bob Godwin (May 5, 1911 in Moultrie, GA – August 1, 1980) was an American boxer who became the 1933 World Light Heavyweight Champion. He was managed by his father, Arthur.

== Pro career ==
Mike McTigue fell to Godwin in Miami on April 7, 1930, in a ten round points decision. Though Godwin remained aggressive, McTigue appeared to land more blows throughout the bout, and the decision was not popular with the crowd. The boxers were criticized for showing little effort in the listless bout. Two months earlier, Godwin took all ten rounds from McTigue in a match in Daytona.

=== Taking the NBA World Light Heavyweight Championship, March, 1933 ===
Godwin turned pro in 1930. He captured the National Boxing Association World Light Heavyweight title on March 1, 1933 with a ten round points decision over reigning champion Joe Knight at Legion Arena in West Palm Beach, Florida. Godwin employed excellent blocking early in the bout. Though he took many hard licks, he remained aggressive and won the infighting, particularly after Knight tired by mid-bout. Godwin took two of the first five rounds, with three even. Drawing on remarkable stamina, the 21-year old Godwin won the next four rounds, leaving the tenth even. Godwin took a beating in the bout, with both eyes badly swollen by the end. It was a primitive match requiring limited boxing skill or ring generalship. Godwin won a total of three of the five meetings between him and Knight.

=== Losing the World Light Heavyweight Championship, March, 1933 ===
Three weeks later, on March 24, 1933 before a crowd of 11,000 at Madison Square Garden, Godwin lost the belt in a unification bout with Maxie Rosenbloom for the NYSAC, National Boxing Association World, and Lineal World Light Heavyweight Titles. Rosenbloom won by a technical knockout 1:16 into the fourth round. Many reporters believed the young Godwin was too injured from his previous fight with Joe Knight to meet the reigning champion. Their suspicions were confirmed when he entered the ring with white tape near both eyes. Rosenbloom immediately took to hammering Godwin's injured eyes, though they bled badly. Godwin hit the mat from a left to the chin for a count of three, and then rose only to soon be knocked down for a four count. He stubbornly withstood two more rounds before the fight was called in the fourth. Many ringside felt the fight was a disgrace.

Henry Firpo fell to Godwin on November 28, 1933, in ten rounds at West Palm's Legion Arena. In the unusual win, Firpo knocked Godwin to the canvas three times in the second round. Godwin's first two falls were no counts, but he took a count of nine in the third knockdown. After Firpo was unable to close the deal, Godwin had his revenge, staying on the inside to score continuous body blows. Showing superior boxing and ring craft, he outsmarted his more experienced opponent.

At Daytona Beach on March 22, 1934, he defeated Johnny Risko in an exciting ten round points decision. Godwin scored a clear margin over his older and heavier opponent, though Risko rallied to take the seventh and eighth. Pounding with left jabs and straight rights, he had his opponent groggy by the third. Godwin put on his greatest exhibition in the third, through sixth, taking each by a wide margin.

He retired after a string of losses in 1941.

== Primary boxing achievements ==
Achievements
| Preceded by Joe Knight | NBA Light Heavyweight Champion; March 1, 1933– March 24, 1933 | Succeeded by Maxie Rosenbloom |

== See also ==
- List of light heavyweight boxing champions
